= Banjo-Kazooie: Grunty's Revenge =

2003 video game

- North American box art
- Developer: Rare (Note: The mobile port and Missions were developed by In-Fusio.)
- Publisher: THQ (Note: Mobile version published by In-Fusio.)
- Composer: Jamie Hughes
- Series: Banjo-Kazooie
- Platforms: Game Boy Advance, mobile
- Release: Game Boy Advance: NA: 15 September 2003; EU: 24 October 2003; Mobile: WW: June 2005
- Genres: Platform, action-adventure
- Mode: Single-player

Banjo-Kazooie: Grunty's Revenge is a 2003 platform game developed by Rare and published by THQ for the Game Boy Advance (GBA). It is the third installment in the Banjo-Kazooie series and is set between the Nintendo 64 games Banjo-Kazooie (1998) and Banjo-Tooie (2000). In Grunty's Revenge, the evil witch Gruntilda travels back in time to prevent the events of Banjo-Kazooie from happening, and the bear Banjo and his bird friend Kazooie set out to stop her. Grunty's Revenge retains the focus on collecting items and most of the other game mechanics from its predecessors, but is presented in 2D rather than 3D. Aside from the main game, players can also access minigames such as fishing and target shooting.

Rare began to plan Grunty's Revenge in August 1999. At this time, it was titled Grunty's Curse and was planned for release on the Game Boy Color, and featured a different plot. Rare was working on the game's sprites when production halted in late 1999, but it was revived after Nintendo released the GBA. It was the first game in the series to not be published by Nintendo; Nintendo rival Microsoft's purchase of Rare in 2002 did not affect their plans to develop the game; Microsoft negotiated a deal with THQ to publish Grunty's Revenge alongside Rare's other GBA projects. The game was released for the GBA in September 2003 and a port for mobile phones was released by In-Fusio in June 2005. Grunty's Revenge received mixed reviews; although its visual style and gameplay were praised and favourably compared to those of the N64 games, its low difficulty, short length, and story were criticised.

== Gameplay ==
Banjo, the player character, explores one of Grunty's Revenge's levels.

Like its Nintendo 64 (N64) predecessors Banjo-Kazooie (1998) and Banjo-Tooie (2000), Banjo-Kazooie: Grunty's Revenge is an adventure platformer with a strong emphasis on collecting items. The player must control the player characters, the bear Banjo and his bird friend Kazooie, through several levels. At the start of the game, the player controls just Banjo, who can walk, jump, crouch, and attack enemies with his backpack. Collecting golden musical notes scattered around levels will enable Banjo to purchase three additional abilities from a mole named Bozzeye. Eventually, Banjo rescues Kazooie, who rides in his backpack for the remainder of the game. With Kazooie, the player can purchase seven new abilities, such as temporary flight. While Grunty's Revenge's game mechanics are largely the same as those from the N64 games, it is presented in 2D from an overhead perspective with pre-rendered graphics, rather than the 3D presentation of its predecessors.

There are five levels (called worlds), which are accessed from the overworld Spiral Mountain. In each world, players must collect items scattered around the environments. These include the musical notes; puzzle pieces called Jiggies, which unlock levels and progress players through the game; empty honeycombs, which extend Banjo's energy bar; and lost creatures called Jinjos, which will give the player a Jiggy when each one in a level is found. Progress is tracked on a statistics screen showing maps of each location and collected items. (Note: This is absent in the mobile version.) Other collectibles include totems and coins; overall, there are more than 750 collectibles. If Banjo gives totems to Mumbo Jumbo, he will gain the ability to transform into other creatures, including a mouse, octopus, candle, or tank, each with its own unique abilities. Some areas in levels are inaccessible unless Banjo buys new abilities or transformations. Every level features an "arena style" boss fight with Gruntilda or her minion, Klungo. Aside from the platforming, some levels feature minigames, such as fishing, racing, and target shooting. The closing credits features a minigame where the player can earn tokens, which can be used to purchase and replay unlocked ones in an arcade cabinet hidden in one of the levels.

== Plot ==
Two months after her defeat by Banjo and Kazooie, (Note: As depicted in Banjo-Kazooie (1998)) Gruntilda's minion Klungo is unable to make any progress moving the boulder crushing her. Instead, he builds a mechanical body for Gruntilda, which she possesses with her spirit. Mecha-Grunty then kidnaps Kazooie and travels twenty years back in time to keep the duo from ever meeting, which would prevent her defeat. Mumbo Jumbo uses his magic to send Banjo back in time and stop her.

Upon his arrival in the past version of Spiral Mountain, Banjo is greeted by Bottles' relative Bozzeye, who received a note from Mumbo prior to Banjo's arrival asking for his assistance. With the aid of Bozzeye and a younger incarnation of Mumbo, Banjo quickly rescues Kazooie, and together they battle Mecha-Grunty and Klungo multiple times before eventually arriving in Gruntilda's Castle, which is still being constructed. The two defeat her, dismantling her robotic body and sending her spirit back to the future and into her real body underground; Gruntilda calls for Klungo to contact her sisters so they can free her. (Note: As depicted in Banjo-Tooie (2000))

The game has two endings depending on the player's completion percentage. In the normal ending, Mumbo sends Banjo and Kazooie back to the present, but accidentally miscasts the spell, creating multiple duplicates of Banjo. If the player collects every Jiggy, Banjo and Kazooie successfully return home and the residents of Spiral Mountain congratulate them, with Banjo inviting their friends over for a card game to celebrate.

== Development ==
Grunty's Revenge was developed by Rare for the Game Boy Advance (GBA), a handheld game console by Nintendo. Production lasted four years and began in August 1999, a year before the release of Banjo-Tooie and when Rare was still a second-party developer for Nintendo. Although it was developed and released on the GBA, Grunty's Revenge was initially planned for the system's predecessor, the Game Boy Color. It was originally titled Banjo-Kazooie: Grunty's Curse and was conceptualised by a small team. Grunty's Curse's story was different: it was set in a parallel universe, did not involve time travel, and would have taken place several years after the events of Banjo-Kazooie. In the story of Grunty's Curse, Gruntilda curses Bottles the mole and Mumbo Jumbo, and kidnaps Kazooie and turns her into a monster; to save them, Banjo must find several magic ingredients. As he has not adventured in a long time, Banjo sets out to be retrained by Bottles' grandfather Grampa Mole (who became Bozzeye in the final version). The original plot is referenced as an in-joke in the final game; when Banjo finds Kazooie, he says he is surprised Gruntilda did not turn her into a monster. Originally conceived as a side-scrolling platformer, Grunty's Curse was to feature more levels and power-ups than Grunty's Revenge. Rare was working on the game's sprites when production halted in late 1999.

Production restarted after Nintendo released the GBA. Rare retitled the game Grunty's Revenge and changed the plot so it would fit better in the series' universe. It was announced and showcased along with Rare's other GBA games they were working on at the time at E3 2001. In 2002, Microsoft, who had entered the gaming industry with the Xbox a year prior, acquired Rare. Despite this, development of Grunty's Revenge continued, as the game was nearly finished and Microsoft did not have a handled system at the time. Rare chose to continue to fine-tune it during their transition to a first-party developer for Microsoft, giving them time to implement 3D computer graphics. A multiplayer mode using the GBA's Game Link Cable was planned but cut. In 2003, Microsoft collaborated with THQ to publish Rare's GBA projects, including Grunty's Revenge, a remake of Sabre Wulf (2004), Banjo spinoff Banjo-Pilot (2005), and It's Mr. Pants (2005). The game was released in North America on 15 September 2003 and in Europe on 24 October. It was Rare's first game after the Microsoft buyout and their first game in 8 years that was not published by Nintendo or Rare themselves. In June 2005, French company In-Fusio released a port of the game for mobile phones, alongside another mobile game comprising the minigames, Grunty's Revenge Missions.

== Reception ==
Reception

Aggregate score
Aggregator	Score
Metacritic	72/100 (GBA)

Review scores
Publication	Score
Eurogamer	6/10 (GBA)
GameSpot	6.8/10 (GBA)
GameSpy	4/5 (GBA)
GameZone	8.2/10 (GBA)
IGN	8/10 (GBA)
Jeuxvideo.com	16/20 (GBA)
Nintendo Life	7/10 (GBA)
Nintendo Power	18/25
Official Nintendo Magazine	78% (GBA)
Pocket Gamer	7/10 (mobile)
Cube	9/10
Play	B+

According to Metacritic, a video game review aggregator, Grunty's Revenge received "mixed or average reviews". Some reviewers, such as those from IGN, GameZone, GameSpy, ONM, and retrospectively Nintendo Life, applauded it as a splendid effort to bring Banjo-Kazooie to a handheld device. Nintendo Life and Official Nintendo Magazine (ONM) highlighted its high amount of similarities to the originals, although a lack of new concepts was a disappointment for ONM, which noted the "collectathon" gameplay as typical of a Rare platformer and thus expected. However, some critics also believed its shortcomings ruined the experience and only recommended it to fans of the series or Rare's games.

Some reviewed Grunty's Revenge in the context of the GBA library. Play celebrated it as a "rare treat" given the low amount of "fully featured platformer/adventures" available on the handheld device, Cube labeling it the best of them so far. GameSpot and Eurogamer, on the other hand, argued it did not stand out from other GBA games; Eurogamer also thought it was inferior to other GBA platform releases, such as a 2003 re-release of Super Mario Bros. 3 (1988).

Reviewers generally agreed the story was subpar. IGN called it "half-baked", weak, and poorly written; they felt it did not use the time travel aspect well and should have had more in-jokes and references to the two previous Banjo-Kazooie games. Others described it as too confusing, "lame", "ludicrous", and failing to add anything innovative to an experience already filled with recycled elements in its gameplay. However, Jeuxvideo.com praised its offbeat, humorous tone.

Reviewers were more generous towards its gameplay, with Nintendo Power calling it "fast-paced and enjoyable" and many favourably comparing it to that of the original games. GameZone and GameSpy thought the series' gameplay transitioned well from the N64 to the GBA, with GameSpy writing Grunty's Revenge did not merely mimic the N64 games and, unlike other platformers, was never repetitive. Jeuxvideo.com found the environments vast. The transfer of the gameplay depth of the N64 to a handheld console with less hardware was praised, Play emphasizing this while the original games' issues of camera and backtracking were addressed: "Every level offers new challenges and new abilities, so the quest continues evolving and new areas are continuously unlocked." The minigames were also praised as an addictive and fun diversion that added depth to the main game. On the negative side, reviewers were disappointed that the promised multiplayer mode was absent; IGN and GameZone agreed the racing minigame would have worked well in a multiplayer mode. Other complaints were levied against the overhead view—which was said to make it difficult to judge heights—and GameSpot believed the best aspects of the game were "overshadowed by its Sisyphean focus on item collecting".

The visuals were acclaimed for their successful recreation of the 3D games into 2D, in addition to the animation, use of vibrant colours, and faithfulness to the N64 games. Nintendo Life favourably compared the pre-rendered graphics to Donkey Kong Country. Eurogamer said that while it was not the GBA's prettiest game, most of Grunty's Revenge's visuals were well-done, although they thought the backgrounds were lacklustre. Jeuxvideo.com and Pocket Gamer were more critical; Jeuxvideo.com felt the colours were odd and the text was hard to read, and Pocket Gamer argued the art style was too cute. Cube, Nintendo Power, and ONM cited issues related to the isometric perspective, such as the inability to judge heights of surfaces and seemingly invisible collision, which caused several missed jumps. Reviewers were surprised by how similar the audio was to the N64 games. IGN called the music catchy and the sound as a whole impressive, and GameZone appreciated that Rare brought "Banjo's hilarious and indescribable jibber-jabber" back.

The low difficulty and short length were primary aspects of criticism. Reviewers estimated that the game could be completed within a matter of hours, and also felt it lacked replay value. ONM suggested the low number of levels was a result of limited memory and the huge amount of graphical detail. GameSpot, for example, believed there were not many areas where players could slow down and interact with the environment, and Eurogamer called the game boring. Boss fights were singled out as one of the game's biggest failings, which Cube noted were commonplace in Rare games; they were criticised for their uninspired nature and lack of challenge, although IGN and Nintendo Life considered the final boss a highlight. Pocket Gamer also wrote it was easy to get lost in the game world.
