= Banjo-Kazooie (video game) =

1998 video game

- North American Nintendo 64 box art
- Developer: Rare (Note: Ported to Xbox 360 by 4J Studios)
- Publishers: Nintendo (N64); Microsoft Game Studios (X360)
- Directors: Gregg Mayles; George Andreas
- Producer: Tim and Chris Stamper
- Designer: Gregg Mayles
- Programmers: Chris Sutherland; Paul Machacek; Graham Smith; Morten Broderson
- Artists: Steve Mayles; John Nash; Kevin Bayliss; Tim Stamper
- Composer: Grant Kirkhope
- Series: Banjo-Kazooie
- Platforms: Nintendo 64; Xbox 360; Evercade
- Release: Nintendo 64: NA: 29 June 1998; EU: 17 July 1998; AU: August 1998; Xbox 360: WW: 26 November 2008; Evercade: WW: 26 June 2026
- Genres: Platform, action-adventure
- Mode: Single-player

Banjo-Kazooie is a 1998 platform game developed by Rare and published by Nintendo for the Nintendo 64. Controlling the player characters, the bear Banjo and the bird Kazooie, the player attempts to save Banjo's kidnapped sister Tooty from the witch Gruntilda. The player explores nine nonlinear worlds to gather items and progress. Using Banjo and Kazooie's traversal and combat abilities, they complete challenges such as solving puzzles, jumping over obstacles, and defeating bosses.

Rare conceived Banjo-Kazooie as a role-playing video game, Dream, for the Super Nintendo Entertainment System following the completion of Donkey Kong Country 2: Diddy's Kong Quest (1995). The 15-member team, led by Gregg Mayles, transitioned development to the Nintendo 64 and retooled the game as a platformer after the role-playing format proved too complex. Banjo-Kazooie was inspired by Super Mario 64 (1996) and designed to appeal to a broad audience, similar to Disney films. Grant Kirkhope composed the soundtrack; Banjo-Kazooie was one of the first games to feature vertical remixing, where various sound layers fade in and out depending on the player's location.

Released in North America in late June 1998 and in Europe the following month, Banjo-Kazooie sold over three million copies, making it one of the bestselling Nintendo 64 games. It received acclaim from critics, who said it surpassed Super Mario 64 as the best 3D platform and adventure game. The game was praised for its visuals, soundtrack, characters, writing, humour, and level design, while criticism was directed towards lack of originality and the camera system. Banjo-Kazooie received numerous year-end accolades, including two from the Academy of Interactive Arts & Sciences: "Console Action Game of the Year" and "Outstanding Achievement in Art/Graphics".

In retrospect, Banjo-Kazooie has been cited as one of the greatest video games ever made. It spawned a series that includes two sequels, Banjo-Tooie (2000) and Banjo-Kazooie: Nuts & Bolts (2008), and two spin-offs, Grunty's Revenge (2003) and Banjo-Pilot (2005). Following Microsoft's 2002 acquisition of Rare, 4J Studios developed a port for the Xbox 360 in 2008, later included in the Xbox One compilation Rare Replay in 2015. It was released on the Nintendo Switch via the Nintendo Classics service in 2022, marking its first rerelease on a Nintendo console. A new port was released for the Evercade line of systems in 2026.

== Gameplay ==
Screenshot of the first world in the game, Mumbo's Mountain. Collecting musical notes grants the player access to new areas of the game's overworld.

Banjo-Kazooie is a single-player platform game in which the player controls the titular protagonists, an easy-going brown honey bear named Banjo and a troublemaking female red-crested "Breegull" Kazooie, from a third-person perspective. The game features nine three-dimensional worlds where the player must gather musical notes and jigsaw puzzle pieces, called Jiggies, to progress.

The player travels from one world to another through Gruntilda's Lair, a region that acts as the game's central overworld. Jiggies allow the player to complete jigsaw puzzles which open doors to new worlds, while musical notes are required to open doors to new sections of the overworld. There are a total of 100 jiggies to collect (ten in each world), all of which are needed to view the proper ending, and 900 notes (100 in each world). The door with the highest amount of required notes has 880, although 765 are needed to enter the final section. Like Super Mario 64 (1996), Banjo-Kazooie is very open and allows the player to collect Jiggies and musical notes in a nonlinear order. It is also possible to complete certain worlds out of order, assuming the player has enough Jiggies and musical notes to reach a world earlier than intended.

Each world is composed of a number of challenges that involve solving puzzles, jumping over obstacles, racing, playing a bonus game, gathering objects, and defeating opponents. Tasks include spelling words, helping lights get on a Christmas tree while protecting them from getting eaten, and looking for a pirate's gold. The game features action-adventure elements, and the player must often interact with non-player characters and help them. It is also possible to increase Banjo and Kazooie's health bar by collecting empty honeycomb pieces (of which there are two in each world), and extra lives by obtaining Banjo statues.

Banjo and Kazooie can perform many abilities, such as jumping, climbing, ground-pounding, swimming, flying, and rolling into enemies. The game has a total of 14 special moves, and some cannot be performed until conversing with Bottles the mole, who teaches them. The breegull and the bear have unique assets. For example, while swimming, Kazooie moves faster but also has a harder time turning directions than Banjo, who only swims when above ground. Kazooie can perform the Talon Trot, where she runs faster and up slopes too steep for Banjo, the Beak Bomb, a long and fast hit towards something with her beak that she pulls off while flying, and either shoot blue eggs from the front or rear. In the middle of jumps or falls from great heights, Kazooie can use her wings to glide Banjo down at a slower speed for a few seconds. She can also fly and jump way higher than Banjo, but these moves can only be activated by standing on pads signifying them; pads with red feathers on them activate flying, green Shock Spring pads the extra jump height. Some abilities require specific items to be performed. For instance, red feathers allow Banjo and Kazooie to fly, while gold feathers protect them from damage. There are two types of collectible shoes that provide temporary abilities. The Turbo Trainer shoes provide a speed burst used to reach a destination on time, while Wellington boots allows Kazooie to run on otherwise harmful ground, such as the piranha-filled waters in Bubblegloop Swamp and shifting sands in Gobi's Valley.

Additionally, found in each world are five small creatures called Jinjos that Gruntilda imprisoned and, upon collection of the entire world's population, grant the duo a Jiggy. For the camera, there are three choices of views and the ability to spin the camera around the player character. However, some areas fix the camera to one angle, which sometimes hides items out of view, requiring the player to choose a first-person perspective to see them.

Banjo and Kazooie are also aided by Gruntilda's sister, Brentilda, who provides information about the witch needed to defeat her, and Mumbo Jumbo, a shaman who used to be Gruntilda's teacher. Mumbo Jumbo can use magical powers to transform them into several creatures. These include a termite, an alligator, a walrus, a pumpkin, and a honeybee. Creatures have their own abilities and allow the player to access otherwise inaccessible challenges, some of which are required to collect jiggies. Before a transformation process is allowed, the player must find a required number of "Mumbo Tokens" in the worlds. By finding a spell book called Cheato in the game's overworld, the player may also unlock secret codes that increase the capacity of Banjo and Kazooie's item inventory, such as the red feathers from 50 to 100 and the blue eggs from 100 to 200.

== Plot ==
Banjo the bear lives on Spiral Mountain with his bird friend, Kazooie, and younger sister, Tooty. One day, an evil witch named Gruntilda, who also lives on Spiral Mountain, asks her sentient cauldron, Dingpot, who the prettiest girl on the mountain is; Dingpot reveals that it is Tooty who is the prettiest, to Gruntilda's frustration and jealousy. Wishing to be prettier than Tooty, Gruntilda decides to steal her beauty. As Tooty talks with Bottles the mole, Gruntilda suddenly arrives and kidnaps Tooty, taking the young girl to her cliffside lair; Banjo and Kazooie hear the commotion and, upon being informed by Bottles of the situation, they venture to Gruntilda's Lair to confront her.

As Banjo and Kazooie enter Gruntilda's Lair, it is revealed that Gruntilda and her minion, Klungo, have built a machine used to transfer Tooty's beauty to Gruntilda's body. Banjo and Kazooie soon discover how to use Jiggies to warp to other lands, where they rescue creatures called Jinjos, whom Gruntilda captured. As the two progress further through Gruntilda's lair, they eventually find Gruntilda, who hosts a quiz game show called "Grunty's Furnace Fun", which offers Tooty as a prize for winning the game but threatens to kill Banjo and Kazooie in lava if they fail. Banjo and Kazooie manage to beat the game thanks to information given prior by Brentilda, Gruntilda's friendly sister, and they rescue Tooty, while Gruntilda flees to the roof of her lair. Afterwards, Banjo and Kazooie return home and celebrate their success with a barbecue until Tooty, knowing that Gruntilda is still at large, urges the two to return to Gruntilda's Lair and properly defeat her.

Upon arriving back in Gruntilda's lair, Banjo and Kazooie meet Dingpot, who resents Gruntilda for all of her abuse toward him and decides to help the two reach the top of the witch's lair. On the roof, Banjo and Kazooie battle Gruntilda and, with help from all the rescued Jinjos, they knock the witch off her tower, causing her to fall to the ground below. A large piece of rubble from the lair falls on top of her, trapping the still-living Gruntilda underneath. With Gruntilda finally defeated, Banjo, Kazooie, Tooty, and Bottles all relax on a beach. In a post-credits scene, Banjo and Kazooie's shaman friend, Mumbo Jumbo, gives information on an upcoming sequel, while Gruntilda and Klungo vow revenge.

== Development ==
=== Origins ===
The origins of Banjo-Kazooie can be traced back to Project Dream, a cancelled video game developed by Rare's Donkey Kong Country 2: Diddy's Kong Quest (1995) team for the Super Nintendo Entertainment System. Inspired by Japanese role-playing games and LucasArts adventure games, Dream was developed for 16 months and starred a boy who got into trouble with a group of pirates. The game used Rare's Advanced Computer Modelling (ACM) graphics technology, first used in Donkey Kong Country (1994), to an advanced level. It involved the layering of several sprites to provide depth, achieved with hundreds of thousands of pounds worth of rendering equipment. As development progressed, the boy was considered by the developers to be generic; thus he was replaced by a rabbit for "two or three days", then a bear who wore a backpack, trainers and cap. The bear eventually became Banjo.

Because the introduction of the Nintendo 64 made the ACM technology obsolete, Rare decided to transition the development of the game to that console. When this occurred, the Nintendo 64 was still known as the Ultra 64. The console was also not powerful enough to generate the amount of sprites the ACM technology required, so the graphics were now run by a "pseudo-3D" engine. The project proved to be too ambitious for the developers, who felt the game was not fun. More than a year into the project, out of desperation "like the end wasn't in sight", the project switched from Dream to a Donkey Kong Country-esque 2.5D side-scrolling platformer, with more depth and range of movement than a typical 2D platformer. It was given the names 2.5-D Banjo and Kazoo.

In the 2.5D game, Banjo would have collected fruits, the equivalent to musical notes in Banjo-Kazooie, in five "fruit houses" named after the fruit in them: oranges, grapes, lemons, bananas and cherries. Collecting jigsaw pieces would have also been done. Similarly to the barrels in Donkey Kong Country, Banjo would have used balls from a variety of sports, such as a football, baseball, American football, bowling ball, basketball, and a water-filled balloon, that could be powered up by a balloon inflator, football boot, football helmet and baseball glove. The enemy parts and hub map were also taken from Donkey Kong Country.

Although the game was 3D, the sprites were flat and rendered from a perspective above them. Rare found executing this convincingly too complicated, such as when the camera angle shifted, which would result in sprites interweaving. Two months into its 2.5D phase, Rare was presented by Nintendo with a "really, really early" version of Super Mario 64 (1996), which exposed them to the perceived future direction it would take the video games market. The genre was changed accordingly, a new 3D engine was built, and the aesthetic became focused on cuteness, requiring an alteration in Banjo's proportions (such as an increased head shape) and less tight shorts to match it. As head programmer Chris Sutherland described the philosophy of the shift in plans, "Although we had a lot less polygons, we could still imbue some character into the characters and the world, even though that left us with a much smaller polygon count." However, much of the controls were the same.

=== Staff and workflow ===
The team comprised both experienced and inexperienced people; some had been working at Rare for 10 years while others had never previously worked on a video game. Gregg Mayles served as the head designer, Mayles' brother Steve "chief scribbler" and character designer, and Chris Sutherland, head programmer. Ed Bryan was also a character artist, specifically Mumbo Jumbo and the Jinjos, as well as animator and box cover artist. Bryan has not revealed much about the making of the cover art, other than that Rare wanted him to "tell a story" with it. Kieran Connell was junior software engineer when the team said "the game had no chance of being completed on time," and Gavin Price joined as tester only a few months after receiving a demo of the game from Official Nintendo Magazine.

Actual work on Banjo-Kazooie started in March 1997 with a development team of 10 people. As development progressed, the team grew to a total of 15 members, which included seven engineers, five artists, two designers and one musician. The development of the game took 17 months to complete after Rare discarded Project Dream, the first two of these being spent experimenting with Dream's graphic technology. Each staff member had a work week of at least 80 hours, each day lasting until three to five in the morning. Mayles and Bryan, in one week, attempted forty hours of normal time and 60 overtime hours for a total of 100 hours. Mayles admitted in 2022 to having worked 102 hours in a single week. Sutherland reported one morning where the Stamper brothers threw stones at his house window, as well as provided a McDonald's meal, to get him to work. As part of Rare's late 1990s strategy of rewarding staff with bonus royalties, the Banjo-Kazooie staff was paid 50 cents per sold game in addition to their average salaries, higher than the 17-cent-per-cartridge amount of GoldenEye 007 (1997) but lower than the full-dollar-per-cartridge total of Rare's subsequent game Donkey Kong 64 (1999).

=== Design ===
Despite being praised by critics and gamers as an improved version of Super Mario 64, Banjo-Kazooie was not intended by the team to simply be that. However, Super Mario 64's 3D aspect was referenced heavily, as it was the only game similar to Banjo-Kazooie that had been released, and Rare intended to combine it with the look of Donkey Kong Country. The developers appreciated the freedom of movement Super Mario 64 provided, but considered it did not take enough advantage of it; instead, it centred on the quick timing and reflexes required for most 2D platformers, which Mayles considered unsuitable for 3D games due to the reduced accuracy in viewing distances. A major reason for this was the camera of a 3D game. Sutherland described Super Mario 64's camera as the camera and the player character being attached to each other with a string, with the only movement being tilting when he moves around the front of the camera. He acknowledged the camera was probably coded that way so as to avoid the player being adrift, but felt it occasionally got behind Mario and would do so even more in Banjo-Kazooie's significantly more complex geometry. For jumping sections, he also found it "fiddly" to have to press buttons just to orientate the camera to see another platform. Thus Banjo-Kazooie's gameplay was mostly exploration and discovery instead of platforming. Rare also disliked Super Mario 64's forcing of the player back into the hub world once they collect a star in the level, thinking that it hindered immersion.

For the collectibles, Mayles wanted Banjo-Kazooie to differ from other games involving collecting, in that "rather than being just a shiny object, [the jiggy] was a shiny object that could actually be used for something." The jinjos, which Mayles deemed the game's most ill-considered collectable, were green-lit out of an idea Rare had since developing Donkey Kong Country, a "hard-to-collect collectable" that chased away or camouflaged when the player was about to obtain it. However, they stood and whistled to the player character in the final product. Other collectables, such as the eggs, feathers, notes and honeycombs, were incorporated to contribute to the theme of the titular protagonists. Difficulty balance was a major focus; for example, the musical notes were ultimately the only collectibles the player would lose if they died or exited a level.

Rare decided to make an action-based game that focused totally on Banjo and his abilities, Kazooie later born out of the planning of them. Mayles wanted Banjo to run really fast and have a double jump, but thought the bear looked strange doing it. According to Mayles, "We came up with the [...] idea that a pair of wings could appear from his backpack to help him perform a second jump. We also wanted Banjo to be able to run very fast when required [so] we added a pair of 'fast-running' legs that appeared from the bottom of the backpack. [And soon after] we came up with the logical conclusion that these could belong to another character, one that actually lived in Banjo's backpack." Furthermore, the backpack containing an animal also made sense of Banjo's relatively slow walk. Kazooie was named after a kazoo, which was considered an annoying instrument, "much like the personality of the bird" to Mayles, while the witch Gruntilda was inspired by Grotbags from the Grotbags ITV television series.

=== Writing and humour ===
Banjo-Kazooie was designed to appeal players of all ages in a similar vein to Disney films. According to Rare, "We wanted the characters to primarily appeal to a younger audience but, at the same time, give them enough humour and attitude not to discourage older players." One major goal was for everything to have personality, down to the collectables, which includes items with eyes and eggs that bounce up and down. Another was its style of humour that distinguished it from other platform games, which Mayles described as "very dry, very typically British, slightly sarcastic, happy to poke fun at ourselves." All the characters, in particular, "basically had something wrong with them", Mayles explained. Banjo-Kazooie continues the trend of Rare games with characters titled "[name] the [animal/object]", the name of the animal or object occasionally rhyming with the name, for example Mumbo Jumbo.

The developers wanted the game to be character-driven, and characters were conceived on the spot, sometimes in relation to design decisions. For example, Mumbo Jumbo originated simply as a way to include animal transformations and for character dynamics to exist between Banjo, Kazooie, and another; Banjo is friendly with Mumbo, but Kazooie cannot stand him. Some jiggies also require solving certain characters' "real world problems" in order to collect. Most of the dialogue was ad-libbed, and a challenge for the designers was to remember the personalities and mindsets of the characters while doing so. The environment of the development farm was dominated by the workers playing various pranks and gags on each other, such as playing a monkey sound Robin Beanland sampled very loudly, pulling each others' shorts down while being smacked in the face, and being called names such as "Winky Boy," "the Shine," and "the Judge." This bled into the style of humour of the final product. They tried to push the E rating of the Entertainment Software Rating Board with Kazooie's sarcastic remarks; a few of them were rejected.

=== Rejected concepts and features ===
Rare originally planned to include a multiplayer mode and more worlds, such as a mine level, but these were not implemented due to time constraints; some were included in the sequel Banjo-Tooie (2000). Connell recalled encountering the team working on a four-player mode only three weeks before Nintendo's approval. Developers were also conflicted between each other whether to create sections where Banjo and Kazooie would be separate from one another, but they ultimately decided it would be "too much." This was another mechanic transferred to Banjo-Tooie.

One scrapped feature, "Stop 'N' Swop", would have allowed Banjo-Kazooie to interact with Donkey Kong 64 (1999), Jet Force Gemini (1999), Banjo-Tooie (2000), Perfect Dark (2000), and Conker's Bad Fur Day (2001). During development, Rare discovered the Nintendo 64 retained flash memory for several seconds after a cartridge's removal. They implemented a feature whereby removing a cartridge and quickly inserting the Banjo-Kazooie cartridge, while the other game's memory was still in the console, would unlock bonus content. Nintendo requested Stop 'N' Swop's removal when Rare submitted Donkey Kong 64 for approval. Nintendo was concerned the Nintendo 64 would not retain RDRAM long enough for the feature to work and that it could potentially damage consoles. Specifically, Nintendo 64 models produced after Banjo-Kazooie's release reduced the amount of time the console retained flash memory, making Stop 'N' Swop nearly impossible to activate as intended.

Preview coverage from July and August 1997 revealed that Tooty was originally Banjo's girlfriend Piccolo, and that there were sixteen levels accessed via jiggies instead of nine. An animation that did not make the released game was named "cack bad egg", and depicts Kazooie laying a gassy rotten egg Banjo reacts to. Another rejected concept was another stage of the final boss, where Gruntilda turned Banjo into a frog.

=== Visuals and levels ===
Banjo-Kazooie was developed on a Silicon Graphics workstation. It employs an advanced technique to render its graphics. The in-game characters were created with minimal amounts of texturing so they could have a sharp and clean look, while the backgrounds use very large textures split into 64×64 pieces, which was the largest texture size the Nintendo 64 could render. A Nintendo Power preview also emphasized its exploitation of the console's LOD management and anti-aliasing. The fact that the player could be transformed into small creatures was implemented to give some of the worlds a different sense of scale. A 2018 Nintendo Life feature discussed how the size and scope of the worlds took advantage of the limited memory and were significant in 3D video games at the time, citing the different seasons in Click Clock Wood, the organ section in Mad Monster Mansion, and Freezeezy Peak's size.

Because the advanced graphics technique caused significant memory fragmentation issues, the developers created a proprietary system that could "reshuffle" memory as players played through the game. More specifically, the programmers centred on culling parts of the world that were not viewable from the perspective. Sutherland and Mayles have admitted in interviews that they do not perceive the practice as being commonplace in the Nintendo 64 library. The designers began implementing this when designing Treasure Trove Cove, which is built around a massive rock structure. Mayles looks back fondly on the method, elaborating that an unintentional consequence was that they focused on hiding objects, which created mystery and intrigue, incentivizing the player to explore the environment to find them. The combination of the big shark Clanker and the player's interaction with him was noted by Nintendo Life as pushing the console, causing issues of frame rate.

Although borrowing similar themes to Super Mario 64, such as desert, ice and haunted house, the worlds were intended to be "a lot more grounded in reality". The worlds were intended to be diverse in theme to give the player new experiences and emotions. Mayles' view was that what a player feels swimming in the water of an island is different from being at a haunted mansion. To conceive them, a theme was chosen first, and then all the traits and design choices, including the animal Mumbo would transform Banjo and Kazooie into, associated with it. His favourite stage was Rusty Bucket Bay, for its design being mostly around a single ship, and the extreme pace and difficulty of the ship's interior. The incorporation of a trivia game at the end was a method of making Banjo-Kazooie unique; the section was initially planned to only have a few questions for the player to answer, but became a massive board game in the end.

=== Audio ===
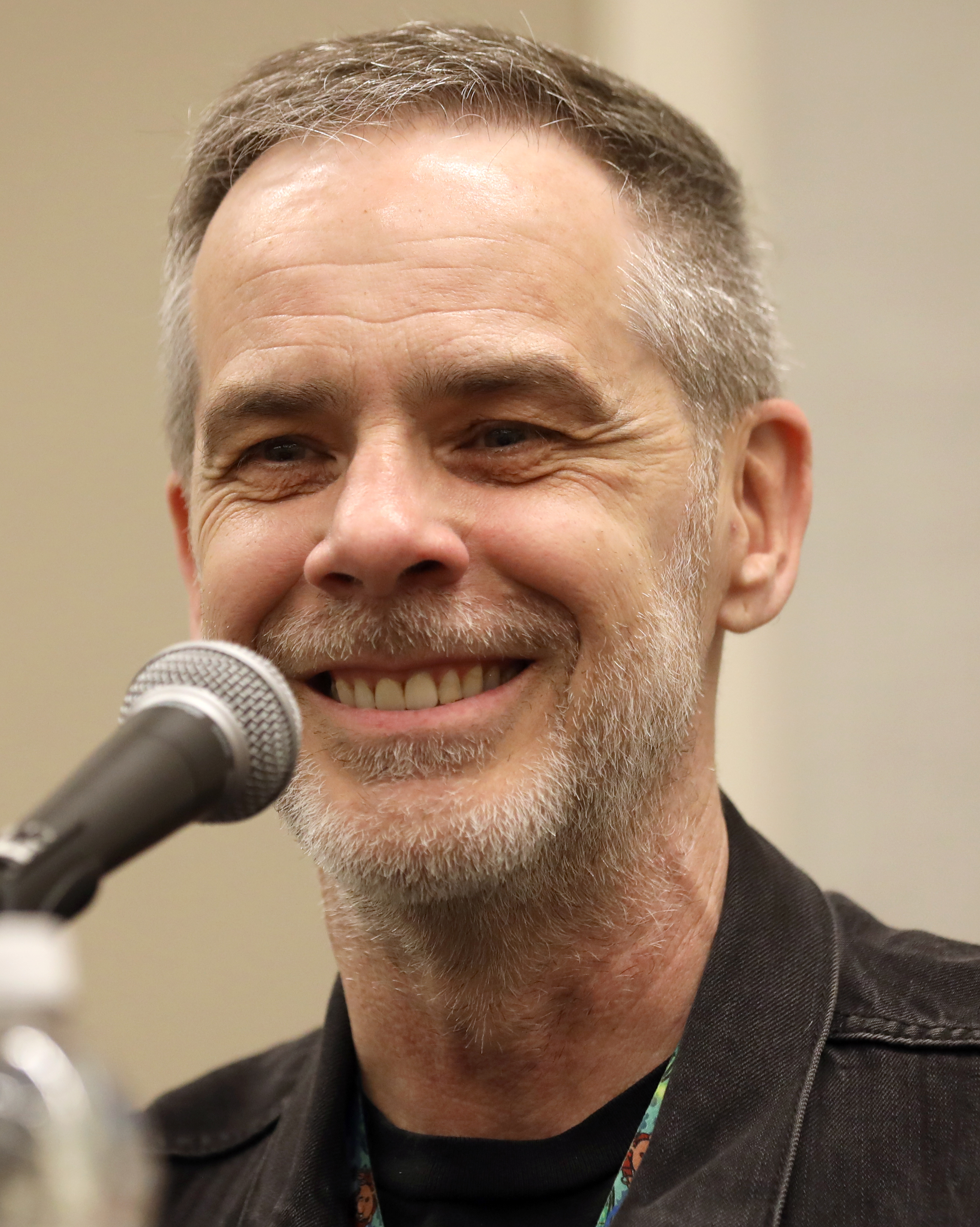
Grant Kirkhope in 2023. Banjo-Kazooie was his first time being solely responsible for the audio.

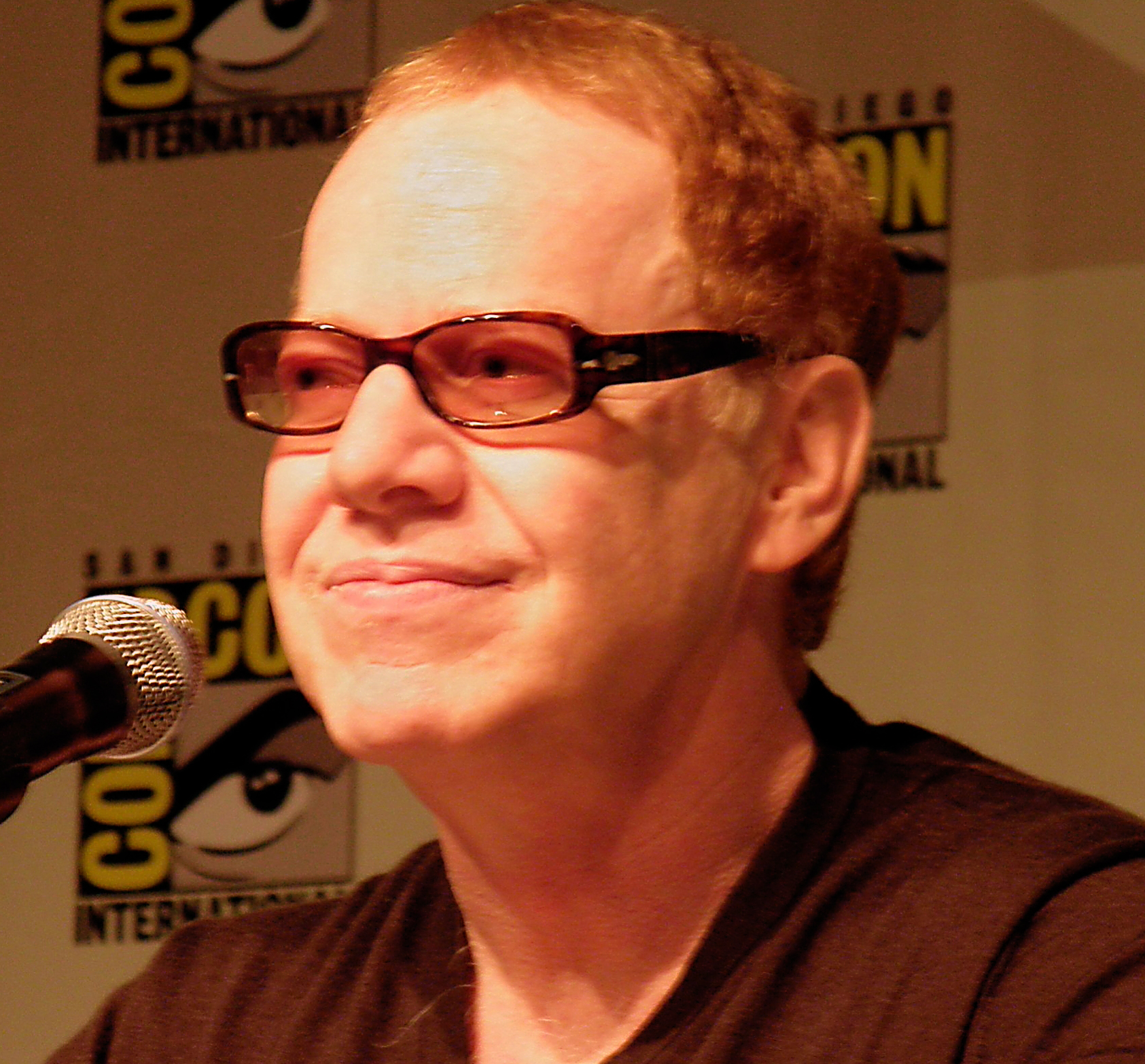
Danny Elfman in 2010. His score for Beetlejuice (1988) influenced how Kirkhope composed Banjo-Kazooie.

Music and sound effects were entirely done by Grant Kirkhope. Although Banjo-Kazooie was not his first project for Rare, as he previously converted David Wise's score for Diddy's Kong Quest to a Game Boy port and helped on Goldeneye 007 (1997), it was the first time he worked on all music and sound effects for a game. Kirkhope was the lead composer on Dream prior to its cancellation; several compositions he wrote for the project were carried forward to Banjo-Kazooie. He conceived the game's musical style after listening to Danny Elfman's score for Beetlejuice (1988). As he explained the philosophy, "I realized you can use really dark chords with dark harmonies, and as long as the rhythm's quite comical it's not going to scare the kids". The chord progression for Mad Monster Mansion was influenced by another Elfman score, that of the 1989 film Batman, specifically the chord progression for the titular character's moments in the cathedral. The compositions feature several instances of tritone to reflect the contrasts between Banjo and Kazooie's character, something Kirkhope conceived when composing the music for Mumbo's Mountain. At one point when the developers were nearly done with the game, Chris Stamper decided that he disliked the first two level tunes for Mumbo's Mountain and Treasure Trove Cove, so Kirkhope had to change them quickly. The original tune for Mumbo's Mountain would be used inside the termite hill, with Kirkhope thinking that it "suited the place". The original tune for Treasure Trove Cove had a middle section inspired by the Fat Boys and the Beach Boys' cover of "Wipe Out" by the Surfaris.

Banjo-Kazooie is significant for its introduction of vertical remixing to video games; various sound layers of the same composition fade in and out depending on which area the player has moved to, such as going from above ground to under water. This came from Mayles commanding Kirkhope to get a step beyond the early 1990s LucasArts' iMUSE, which faded between themes instead of sound layers. Animal sound effects are also occasionally instruments.

After Dream was disbanded, Rare was focused on getting Banjo-Kazooie finished as much as possible. One way to do this was to reject Dream's pre-recorded speech and have the dialogue be presented in text; however, they still wanted the feeling of speech. As a compromise, all the characters have their voices executed via "mumbling", with text presenting dialogue. This choice was made to convey their personalities without them actually speaking, as Rare felt the actual speech "could ruin the player's perception of the characters." Banjo, Kazooie, and other characters such as Clanker, the Ancient Ones and Napper (Banjo's voice pitch-shifted down to save space on the cartridge) were performed by Sutherland, who voiced Edson in Dream. Some of Edson's voice clips, such as "Guh-huh!", were re-used for Banjo. Kirkhope performed the voices of Mumbo Jumbo, the Jinjos, the Mumbo Token, the Flower Urns, and most of the villains, including Conga, the Gravestones and Gruntlings. Mumbo's speech was made up of cut-up samples of Kirkhope's voice that would later be used on the soundtrack of the Mayahem Temple level in the game's sequel Banjo-Tooie, which Kirkhope revealed in an episode of Game Grumps was actually him saying, "Come and have a go if you think you're hard enough," a famous English football chant. According to Kirkhope, Mumbo's "Oomenacka" came from something that Kirkhope said in a doctor's surgery while having his groin examined. He originally said, "Oh, me knacker," "knackers" being a British slang word for "testicles". Chris Seavor provided the voice of Gruntilda, Eveline Novakovic voiced Tooty and Brentilda, and Bottles and Rubee were voiced by artist Lee Ray, who voiced Captain Blackeye in Dream.

== Release and promotion ==
In June 1997, a working version of the game was shown at the Electronic Entertainment Expo, where it was officially announced that Dream had become Banjo-Kazooie. The panel, for what was considered by 64 to be Nintendo's flagship game at the event, featured several big machines and sculptures, such as those for Banjo and Mumbo Jumbo. The whole team got to attend for the game's unveiling, all feeling proud of their work. The Nintendo 64 games presented at E3 were lauded by Nintendo Power as "pushing the boundaries of interactive entertainment, innovation, and intensity". Banjo-Kazooie was a major example, highlighting how its advanced technology created a Disney-esque "rich, animated world full of fun animals and great music", visuals containing "rich textures, creative lighting," and dynamic music. The reaction from gamers and critics towards the game was generally positive, 64 magazine predicting it to be "the biggest hit of the year." However, it was also met with skepticism as a rip-off of Super Mario 64 and overly cute, and despised its new name. The gaming community was also mystified by some of its concepts, such as the usage of a bird-bear duo for a Super Mario 64-esque genre, fart sound effects for speech, and Kazooie pooping out eggs as an attack.

The game was then presented at the 1997 annual Nintendo Space World event, where the first five worlds were playable. Its panel had women that were dressed up as Banjo with shirts on. N64 Magazine gave a glowing review of the panel, admitting it to be the event's most absorbing experience, even moreso than The Legend of Zelda: Ocarina of Time, which received the most attention from other gamers and journalists. They considered the worlds immersive due to its "graphical opulence," such as the "incredibly realistic ripples" on the water, and choice of environments "realistic" even considering the cartoony characters. They also positively commented on its implementation of the dual-character mechanic (particularly how certain sections require a specific character unlike other games).

Banjo-Kazooie was initially scheduled for a release in November 1997, in the United States on 24 November, but was delayed to give developers more time for polish. When Rare met Nintendo of America CEO Howard Lincoln at E3 1997, he was against a delay, complaining: "We've committed $20 million to this campaign". To fill that year's Christmas schedule, Lincoln told Rare to include Donkey Kong characters in an R.C. Pro-Am game they were developing at the time, turning it into Diddy Kong Racing (1997). Eurogamer called Diddy Kong Racing "something of a testing ground for Rare's [Nintendo 64]-era heroes", as it included Banjo and Conker as playable characters prior to featuring in their own games. In the following months, Rare released screenshots at such a rate that by May 1998, N64 Magazine suspected the game was completed besides testing.

Banjo-Kazooie was released on 29 June 1998 in North America, 17 July 1998 in Europe, August 1998 in Australia, and 6 December 1998 in Japan as Banjo and Kazooie's Big Adventure (バンジョーとカズーイの大冒険). The Japan date was shifted multiple times, set to be released before other territories in January 1998 as of November 1997, and moved to April months later. The UK date was also set to 16 March 1998 as of Christmas 1997, before being moved to July two months later. In Europe, the game was released in the summer, an active season for Nintendo 64 releases that followed a scarce period and included games of various genres, such as Quest 64, Mortal Kombat 4, Off Road Challenge, Dezaemon 3D and Virtual Chess 64 (all 1998). It had a marketing budget of $10 million.

Banjo-Kazooie performed well in both the UK and US. Virgin Megastore reported that the game was topping the UK charts as of 21 September 1998. In Japan, Banjo-Kazooie entered Famitsu's Top 10 sales charts for the week ending 13 December 1998, selling 74,000 copies for a total of 117,399. According to the NPD Group, Banjo-Kazooie was the fourth best-selling video game of 1998 in the United States by unit sales, behind GoldenEye 007, The Legend of Zelda: Ocarina of Time, and Gran Turismo. At the 1999 Milia festival in Cannes, the game took home a "Gold" prize for revenues above €26 million in the European Union during 1998. As of March 2003, the game had sold more than 405,000 units in Japan. As of December 2007, it had sold more than 1.8 million copies in the US. As of 2021, Banjo-Kazooie worldwide sales were 3 million, making it the tenth highest-grossing Nintendo 64 game.

== Critical reception ==
Reception (N64)

Aggregate score
Aggregator	Score
Metacritic	92/100

Review scores
Publication	Score
AllGame	4.5/5
Consoles +	96%
Computer and Video Games	5/5
Edge	8/10
Electronic Gaming Monthly	9.5/10; 9.5/10; 9/10; 9.5/10
EP Daily	9.5/10
GamePro	5/5; 5/5; 5/5; 5/5
GameRevolution	A-
GameSpot	9.5/10
Hyper	92/100
IGN	9.6/10
Joystick	88/100
Mega Fun	92/100
MeriStation	9/10
N64 Magazine	92%
Next Generation	4/5
Nintendo Power	9.2/10
Video Games (DE)	95%
64	95%
Adrenaline Vault	4/5
The Cincinnati Enquirer	4/5
Nintendo Acción	97/100

Banjo-Kazooie garnered critical acclaim upon its release. At Metacritic, which assigns a normalized rating out of 100 to reviews from mainstream publications, it garnered a weighted average of 92, based on 19 entries. Computer and Video Games (CVG) and GamePro provided perfect scores (it was one of CVG's "high five!" recommendations, which was for games scored five hands out of five), while ratings of reviews from sources like Electronic Gaming Monthly (EGM), GameSpot, and IGN were extremely close. It was also the "Game of the Month" for Hyper. Contemporaneous reviews constantly called Banjo-Kazooie the best platform and action-adventure game at the time, surpassing Super Mario 64, and the best game on the Nintendo 64, a console that was generally "weak" with adventure and platform games according to Chris Harding of Adrenaline Vault.

Banjo-Kazooie was complimented for the utilization of simultaneous control of two characters with different abilities, complimenting and contributing to the design of the rest of the game.. Lucas noted the adaptiveness of the controls, especially for players of Super Mario 64, and the flexibility and freedom of movement the two-character mechanic provided, which was also praised by Nintendo Acción. Hyper's Cam Shea also reported the controls as intuitive, as well as responsive, and enthusiastically wrote the incorporation of several abilities resulted in a variety of challenges and puzzles, making for an "action packed" experience. Lucas also noted how the learning of moves correlated with the increase in difficulty.

The most-critiqued aspect was the camera. Reviewers positively noted the amount of control the player had over it. However, they were critical of the fixed viewpoints, such as those for underwater sections and tight areas that obscured items from the main field of view, and instances where the camera gets stuck on a wall. Hyper and N64 Magazine found most of the fixed viewpoints tolerable, and appreciated the manual camera control. N64 Magazine and Nintendo Acción found the camera control intuitive, but felt Super Mario 64 was better in terms of the camera.

Critics suggested potentially high amounts of time to complete the game, estimates ranging from 35–50 hours, which was attributed to the world size, amount of objectives, challenge of the later levels, and backtracking. GamePro stated the amount of tasks and big size surpassed most other consoles games at the time. EGM's testimony stated "a feeling of great depth" and interactive-ness, filled with large parts of the world that "floors" the player, such as the shark Clanker and a large snowman's scarf to slide on." Joystick also highlighted the non-linear progression, and the amount of "twists and turns" that resulted from it. Critics Victor Lucas and Alex Huhtala were stunned by the size of the areas, especially the overworld that they considered the size of a single game, where "it takes ages just to get from one level entrance to another." The huge amount of collectibles in comparison to Super Mario 64, in spite of the lesser number of worlds, was also highlighted.

Critics noted the game's similarities to Super Mario 64 in its controls, cute character design, level themes, the incorporation of an overworld, and moves. However, it was also celebrated for building off of what made Super Mario 64 successful. The game's little originality was also brought up but factored differently between opinions. Some were apathetic, such as GameSpot's Jeff Gerstmann who elaborated that it simply "makes the logical progressions you would expect Nintendo to make." However, others were let down.

Nintendo Acción, EGM and The Cincinnati Enquirer considered Banjo-Kazooie's graphics the greatest in the N64 library. Devoid of the console's usual issues of repetitive textures, fogging and lagging framerates, the game was highlighted for its effects, such as lighting, water ripples, transparency, sun ray diffraction, and leaves falling, and textures. Any reported graphical issues were trivial. Its characters were noted as more rounded and similar to an animated film or cartoon. IGN was astonished by the attention to detail to all aspects of the experience, such as the interface of the save file options. Some critics argued Banjo-Kazooie would appeal to all ages. However, some were turned off by the cuteness, which Video Games felt would alienate any player above 12, and Lucas argued was a poor choice for a game released in a market oversaturated with cute products.

Critics praised the personality, dialogue, and voice method of the characters, GameSpot comparing the way of speaking to Charlie Brown's teacher. Gruntilda's taunts were among the highlighted examples of the game's dialogue and humour by sources such as Mega Fun, which noted the distinctiveness of its British sense of humour. Shea called the game's conclusion "one of the most creative and satisfying endings yet seen in a platformer." Opinions on the characters themselves were mixed, with particular criticism towards characters with eyes. At worst, Lucas condemned the characters in it and Diddy Kong Racing as "so half-baked and overtly cliched they almost sabotage the ingenuity of the titles they belong to." He was especially desensitized by the "regurgitated, ill conceived, and down right offensive" arc and humour of Gruntilda, where she tries to look like "the hottest looking old witch Cosmopolitan magazine has ever seen" and is mocked for her weight and unattractiveness: "I was expecting to be charmed by some truly witty English entendres and non-sequiturs but instead, I was bludgeoned by fat jokes and lots of silliness about Gruntilda being a nose picker."

The music and sound effects were well-received, highlighted for the dynamic music component which contributed to the atmosphere; N64 Magazine stated it gave the game "far more atmosphere than any streaming CD music could ever manage." The borrowing of melodies from children's songs, such as "Teddy Bears' Picnic" for Gruntilda's Lair, were also noted. Harding and Shea was amazed by the detail in the sound effects, down to the biting and swimming sounds of the sharks and piranhas being dissimillar, and squelsh sounds occurring when Banjo steps on goop.

=== Accolades ===
In 1999, Banjo-Kazooie received two awards during the 2nd Annual Interactive Achievement Awards: "Console Action Game of the Year" and "Outstanding Achievement in Art/Graphics"; it also received nominations for "Game of the Year", "Console Game of the Year", and "Console Adventure Game of the Year". IGN awarded the game Overall Best Graphics of 1998, Best Texture Design of 1998, and Best Music of 1998.

== Legacy ==
=== Sequels and re-releases ===
Critical reception (re-releases)

Aggregate score
Aggregator	Score
Metacritic	77/100 (X360)

Review scores
Publication	Score
Eurogamer	5/10 (X360)
IGN	8/10 (X360)
Nintendo Life	10/10 (NS)
Official Xbox Magazine (US)	8/10 (X360)
PALGN	8.5/10 (X360)
TeamXbox	8.3/10 (X360)
VideoGamer.com	8/10 (X360)

A sequel, Banjo-Tooie, was released for the Nintendo 64 in 2000 and largely adopts the gameplay mechanics of its predecessor. The Banjo-Kazooie series continued to be developed with the release of Banjo-Kazooie: Grunty's Revenge and Banjo-Pilot for the Game Boy Advance in 2003 and 2005, respectively. The characters Banjo and Kazooie proved to be popular and were once seen as a potential mascot for the Xbox 360 console. A third main game, Banjo-Kazooie: Nuts & Bolts, was released for the Xbox 360 in 2008. Nuts & Bolts is a departure from its predecessors and involves the player building vehicles of all shapes and sizes to complete challenges.

An Xbox Live Arcade version of Banjo-Kazooie, developed by 4J Studios, was released for the Xbox 360 on 26 November 2008. This version runs in a full widescreen mode with an updated 1080p resolution, cleaner audio and consistent frame rate, includes achievements, and supports the "Stop 'N' Swop" connectivity that was incomplete in the Nintendo 64 game, used now to unlock features in both Banjo-Kazooie: Nuts & Bolts and the then-upcoming Xbox Live Arcade version of Banjo-Tooie. The Xbox Live Arcade version was generally well received by critics, featuring an aggregate score of 77 out of 100 at Metacritic and generally considered a solid revival of a classic. TeamXbox praised its controls as very responsive in comparison to most other XBLA re-releases. However, the port also reminded them of the game's original issues, especially with the camera, such as the inability to look up high enough, resulting in several items that are not seen on screen, and the camera flipping at inopportune moments. PALGN reported brief pauses in one of Gruntilda's cutscenes and returns to the hub world, and disappearances of collectables like musical notes and jiggies. PALGN was also disappointed in the small amount of rewards provided by the Stop 'N' Swop feature for Nuts & Bolts, only a few vehicle accessories. In 2009, IGN ranked it seventh on its list of Top 10 Xbox Live Arcade Games. In 2015, the Xbox Live Arcade version became one of the first backwards compatible titles for Xbox One, and was re-released as part of the Rare Replay (2015) video game compilation. In 2019, this version was enhanced to run at native 4K resolution on Xbox One.

Banjo-Kazooie was added to the Nintendo Switch's Nintendo Classics library on 20 January 2022, marking its first re-release on a Nintendo console. The game was included on the Super Pocket Rare Edition retro handheld, part of the Evercade line of systems, on 26 June 2026. The Evercade version is a native port developed in collaboration with Rare based on the game's original source code. It includes added performance enhancements and additional features, including an unlockable cheat menu and a music player unlocked through Stop 'N' Swop that contains unused music tracks. This version was packaged with Banjo-Tooie on the Banjo-Kazooie Double Pack cartridge as a pack-in for the Evercade Nexus the following 30 October.

=== Fan efforts ===
In the 2010s, fans developed a level editing tool for Banjo-Kazooie called "Banjo's Backpack", allowing amateur developers to create custom levels and campaigns for the game. One developer, Mark Kurko, has created several popular ROM hacks for the game, including The Jiggies of Time, a recreation of The Legend of Zelda: Ocarina of Time, and Nostalgia 64, a crossover between multiple Nintendo 64 games.

In 2024, a fan fully decompiled the original ROM image into C source code. On 25 January 2026, a team of modders released Banjo: Recompiled, a static recompilation of Banjo-Kazooie using a custom tool that helps translate N64 binaries into C. A native PC port was also unveiled, allowing the game to be played on Windows, MacOS and Linux without emulation, supporting unlimited frame rate, ultrawide monitors and modifications. The port's development team also worked with Kurko to create PC ports of The Jiggies of Time and Nostalgia 64, which were released alongside that of the main game. To avoid copyright infringement, the port ships without the game data, requiring the player to provide a ROM image of the game, expected to be obtained legally via dumping the N64 cartridge data. PC Gamer praised the recompilation, noting its "lack of input lag and uncanny visual clarity." A second, decompilation-based PC port of the game, "Lighthouse", was released on 31 July 2026. Developed by Harbour Masters, who previously developed the Ocarina of Time port "Ship of Harkinian", Lighthouse features a built in randomizer, support for most Banjo's Backpack based ROM hacks, and online cooperative multiplayer, with plans to integrate support for the Archipelago cross-game randomizer in a post-launch update.

=== Retrospective reception ===
Banjo-Kazooie is occasionally included in "best games" lists by video game publications. In terms of best all-time Nintendo 64 entries, it was ranked number seven on IGN's 2000 list, six on NME's 2017 list and Video Games Chronicle's 2021 list (where it tied with Banjo-Tooie), five by Digital Spy in 2017, eight on rankings by Shacknews in 2021 and GamesRadar in 2022, thirteen by SVG.com in 2022, and two on a 2022 Destructoid top-five article. As Mark Beaumont jested, "A bear with a bird rucksack runs around a 3D platform jungle making some of the most annoying noises this side of the guy from Interpol singing – and somehow this made for one of the most engrossing games of a generation." It also appeared on unranked N64 game lists, such as in 2014 by Retro Gamer, in 2021 by PC Magazine and 2022 by news.com.au and GameSpot. Shacknews called it the fifth best Rare game in 2018, while New York magazine's Vulture website, in 2022, listed it as one of "The 25 Best Games on Nintendo Switch Online." In 2009, Game Informer ranked the game 71st in their list of the Top 100 Games Of All Time. The same year, Official Nintendo Magazine ranked the game 36th in a list of greatest Nintendo games. In 2021, it ranked number 21 on Retro Gamer's special edition of 100 Games To Play Before You Die: Nintendo Consoles Edition.

According to Nintendo Life's 10/10 review of the Switch re-release, the game was "a benchmark for 3D platforming excellence that has rarely been replicated since." Claims of Banjo-Kazooie being greater or a close second to Super Mario 64, as well as building off already-established aspects of the 3D platform game, continue in writings by retrospective journalists. Positives have been commonly cited toward its British sarcastic humour, which has been suggested to distinguish it from other games of its kind released in the same generation, as well as its graphics, controls, soundtrack, challenge, variety, likeable characters, and atmosphere, scope and design of its levels. news.com.au reasoned the "charming characters and memorable moments" made up for the scale being slightly less than Super Mario 64 and Banjo-Tooie. GameSpot's Darryn Bonthuys wrote it "was nearly perfect, a game that hit the Goldilocks zone of size, fun, and challenge with its design, while also offering a soundtrack that would make you tap holes in your floor." The game is frequently described as a capturer of hearts and spirits, SVG.com and news.com.au stating it was the only entry in the series to do so.

Opinions on how well Banjo-Kazooie has aged differ. Reviews of the XBLA port from Eurogamer and IGN considered it outdated in its gameplay style and issues related to the controls and camera. Others, however, argue the game still holds up and is one of very few retro 3D platformers to do so, which was expressed as early as 2000 by Matt Casamassina and as late as 2022 by long-time video game journalist Chris Scullion's book Jumping for Joy: The History of Platform Video Games. Banjo-Kazooie has also been cited as part of a 1990s golden age of Rare entries that showed a frequency and strong devotion to quality in the platform and shooter genres, which began with Donkey Kong Country and mostly encompassed the Nintendo 64. Banjo-Kazooie has been the most acclaimed of these games. Victor Lucas, reviewing the game for The Electric Playground upon its release, noticed it was a part of Rare's "bombardment of triple A games", which also included Goldeneye 007, Diddy Kong Racing and Conker's Bad Fur Day.

=== Influence ===
As some critics put it, Banjo-Kazooie showed Nintendo's EAD was not the only developer to pull off a first-rate 3D platformer. Banjo-Kazooie was also one of the most notable products of a platform-adventure trend of games that emphasized exploration, increasing abilities of the player character, and inventory management, which peaked in the Nintendo 64 and PlayStation era. Kirkhope recalled Rare getting tired of making Banjo games after Tooie, contributed by Rare's general anti-sequel philosophy.

A frequently-cited reason for the decline of the trend was the overwhelming amount of collectables, of which Rare's 3D platformers were particularly notorious. Although Kotaku and Kirkhope considered items to obtain the most excessive on Donkey Kong 64 and Banjo-Tooie, Banjo-Kazooie's "charming-if-pushing-it collecting of items" was cited as an example. GamesRadar journalist Darren Jones, conversely, felt the game struck the perfect balance of collectables. Reviewing the 2008 XBLA port, Official Xbox Magazine argued players had less tolerance for limited lives and "endless hint-free puzzles", while IGN suggested, "Most gamers have had their fill of simple fetch and hop games and like a bit more action and drama on their consoles."

The platform trend was revitalized in the mid-2010s with the release of remakes of platform games like Crash Bandicoot N. Sane Trilogy (2017) and Spyro Reignited Trilogy (2018) and indie games like A Hat in Time (2017), which was marketed as being influenced by Banjo-Kazooie. The game's developer, Jonas Kaerlev, explained that his goal was to magnify the positives of the 1998 N64 game, including exploration, charm, and puzzle-solving, while mitigating its flaws, such as endless collecting and a camera. He admitted two levels were explicitly based on Banjo-Kazooie segments, a race with another character and a ticket collection, were removed due to poor test player reception. The resurgence of these games as well as the announcement of the reboot Battletoads (2020) influenced speculation of another game in the Banjo-Kazooie series, Mayles in 2018 revealing it from "aggrieved people on Twitter."

As one of the earliest platformers, Banjo-Kazooie rejected the start-to-end structure of the Mario series in favor of exploration. Many of the 3D Mario games continued to follow their linear formula until Super Mario Odyssey (2017), where the player can explore the world without a time limit and remains in it after collecting a power moon. Additionally, Odyssey's capture mechanic, where Mario turns into whatever object or animal it latches onto, is similar to Mumbo's animal transformations in Banjo-Kazooie and Banjo-Tooie. Nintendo never publicized if they took inspiration from the Banjo games. As Mayles responded, "We took enough influences from Nintendo's games, so if they were influenced by Banjo, then that's kind of a nice thing."

A spiritual successor to Banjo-Kazooie, Yooka-Laylee, was released in 2017 by Playtonic Games, a studio founded by ex-Rare staff, including members of the Banjo-Kazooie development team.
