= Banjo-Kazooie =

Video game franchise

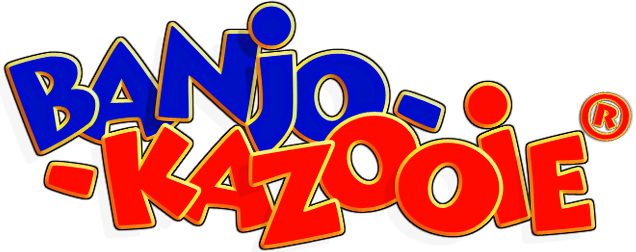
- Genres: Platform; Action-adventure
- Developers: Rare (1998-2008); In-Fusio (2005); 4J Studios (2008-2009)
- Publishers: Nintendo (1998–2000); THQ (2003–2005); In-Fusio (2005); Xbox Game Studios (2008–present)
- Creators: Gregg Mayles; Steve Mayles
- Platforms: Nintendo 64; Game Boy Advance; Java ME; Xbox 360; Xbox One
- First release: Banjo-Kazooie; 29 June 1998
- Latest release: Banjo-Kazooie: Nuts & Bolts; 11 November 2008

Banjo-Kazooie is a platform game series developed by the British studio Rare. The games focus on the two title characters―Banjo, a male brown bear; and Kazooie, a large female red bird of the fictional breegull species who is typically seen riding in Banjo's backpack―both of whom are controlled by the player. The games generally involve the pair in conflict with the evil witch Gruntilda Winkybunion. The eponymous first game in the series was released in 1998 to critical acclaim and was followed by Banjo-Tooie (2000), Banjo-Kazooie: Grunty's Revenge (released in 2003, set in between the first and second game, additionally including story elements from before both games due to a time travel mechanic), Banjo-Pilot (2005), a spinoff kart racing game, and Banjo-Kazooie: Nuts & Bolts (2008), a mainline open world kart racing game.

The franchise debuted on the Nintendo 64, while subsequent entries in the series also released for Game Boy Advance and Xbox 360. The three main titles were also included in the Xbox One compilation Rare Replay. The franchise has been largely dormant since the release of Nuts & Bolts; its characters, however, have made occasional appearances in later crossover titles such as Sega's All-Stars Racing series and Nintendo's Super Smash Bros. series.

== Games ==
Release timeline
1998	Banjo-Kazooie
1999
2000	Banjo-Tooie
2001
2002
2003	Banjo-Kazooie: Grunty's Revenge
2004
2005	Banjo-Pilot
2006
2007
2008	Banjo-Kazooie: Nuts & Bolts

=== Console ===
==== Banjo-Kazooie (1998) ====
Banjo-Kazooie was released on 29 June 1998 for the Nintendo 64, re-released in 2008 for the Xbox 360 via Xbox Live Arcade and is available on Nintendo Switch via Nintendo Classics. In a region called Spiral Mountain, Banjo's sister Tooty is kidnapped by Gruntilda the witch, who wants to steal Tooty's beauty for herself, and Banjo and Kazooie must save her. The goal is to progress through Gruntilda's lair and the various worlds within it, collect items such as golden jigsaw puzzle pieces and music notes that allow Banjo and Kazooie to progress through their quest, and defeat Gruntilda. At the final battle, she is knocked off of her castle-like lair and is trapped beneath a boulder. The game has a central focus on 3D platforming challenges, in conjunction with action-adventure game elements as well as a large variety of puzzles.

==== Banjo-Tooie (2000) ====
Banjo-Tooie was released in 2000 for the Nintendo 64, re-released in 2009 for the Xbox 360 via Xbox Live Arcade and is available on Nintendo Switch via Nintendo Classics. Two years after Banjo and Kazooie defeat Gruntilda in the game's predecessor, two of her sisters arrive and free her from beneath the boulder. Now reduced to a skeleton, Gruntilda plans to drain the life energy from the entirety of the game's hub world, the Isle O' Hags, to restore herself to normal, leaving Banjo and Kazooie to stop her plans. Saving the day once again, the bear and bird cause the destruction of most of Gruntilda's skeletal body, leaving only her skull. Tooie is controversial for being significantly harder than the first game in that, besides tougher obstacles and platforming challenges, it places a higher emphasis on puzzle-solving and backtracking, often requiring the player to revisit previous worlds to complete them. Many features not included in the previous game appear, including improved graphics and controls, and a four-player multiplayer mode.

==== Banjo-Kazooie: Nuts & Bolts (2008) ====
Banjo-Kazooie: Nuts & Bolts was released in 2008 for the Xbox 360. Eight years after the events of Tooie, Banjo and Kazooie, under the direction of the Lord of Games (L.O.G.), the grand creator of all video games, compete with Gruntilda in a series of challenges to claim control of Spiral Mountain. The first original Banjo-Kazooie game released on a non-Nintendo system, Nuts & Bolts features several departures from the concepts used by the first two games, the most notable being that Banjo and Kazooie must construct vehicles to control and complete challenges with, as opposed to nonlinear platforming and basic puzzle-solving. These changes to gameplay mechanics, along with a heavily updated visual style for the world and characters, have been controversial among fans and critics.

=== Handhelds ===
==== Banjo-Kazooie: Grunty's Revenge (2003) ====
Banjo-Kazooie: Grunty's Revenge was released in 2003 for the Game Boy Advance. Taking place two months after Banjo-Kazooie, Klungo, Gruntilda's most loyal henchman, makes a robot for Gruntilda's spirit to dwell inside. The newly created "Mecha-Grunty," infused with a transferred Gruntilda's spirit, travels back in time to prevent the first meeting of Banjo and Kazooie. Banjo and Kazooie, with assistance from their shaman friend Mumbo Jumbo, stop her plans and send her back to beneath the boulder in Spiral Mountain. Gruntilda commands Klungo to contact her sisters, setting the events of Banjo-Tooie in motion. The game features mechanics very similar to those of Banjo-Kazooie and Banjo-Tooie, but is played from an isometric perspective and has simplified controls. A port for mobile phones was released in 2004, and a mobile compilation of the game's minigames, titled Banjo-Kazooie: Grunty's Revenge Missions, was released in 2005.

==== Banjo-Pilot (2005) ====
Banjo-Pilot was released in 2005 for the Game Boy Advance. This game is not part of the plot of the series, but is a racing game similar to Mario Kart in which the characters race planes. The game was originally planned as a sequel to Diddy Kong Racing, titled Diddy Kong Pilot, but was retooled to feature Banjo-Kazooie characters following the purchase of Rare by Microsoft.

=== Re-releases ===
Banjo-Kazooie and Banjo-Tooie were re-released on Xbox 360 via Xbox Live Arcade in 2008 and 2009 respectively. These versions featured fully HD graphics for both the polygonal models and 2D images. They also included revised controls and the reinstatement of the Stop 'N' Swop feature. Both re-releases were included alongside Banjo-Kazooie: Nuts & Bolts as part of the 30 game compilation Rare Replay, released for Xbox One on 4 August 2015.

Banjo-Kazooie was added to the Nintendo Switch's Nintendo Classics library on 20 January 2022, marking the series' first re-release on a Nintendo console. Banjo-Tooie was added to the service on 25 October 2024.

Banjo-Kazooie was ported to the Evercade line of products in June 2026 as part of the HyperMegaTech Super Pocket Rare Edition. It is also included in the Banjo-Kazooie Double Pack alongside a port of Banjo-Tooie, released the following October. The Evercade ports run at 60 frames per second and feature new quality of life improvements, as well as restored content and new Stop 'N' Swop unlockables.

== Other appearances ==
Prior to Banjo-Kazooie, Banjo's first appearance was as a playable racer in Diddy Kong Racing, released for Nintendo 64 in 1997. In Conker's Bad Fur Day & Conker: Live & Reloaded, Banjo's head can be seen, disembodied, above the fireplace in the main menu. Additionally, Kazooie's head can be found on the end of an umbrella in the chapter select screen for both games. In Grabbed by the Ghoulies, pictures of the characters and levels are seen throughout the game, along with monster versions of Banjo and Kazooie's heads mounted on the walls. Banjo and Kazooie also appear as a playable racer in the Xbox 360 version of Sonic & Sega All-Stars Racing. Developer Sumo Digital collaborated with Rare for the character's inclusion, with Rare giving Sumo access to their asset library as well as designing and modeling Banjo and Kazooie's in-game vehicle. Several character skins based on the series are available as downloadable content in various versions of Minecraft.

Banjo and Kazooie also appear as a single playable fighter via downloadable content in the 2018 crossover fighting game, Super Smash Bros. Ultimate. Phil Spencer, head of the Xbox brand, stated that negotiating the characters' inclusion was an "easy deal to make" thanks to their strong third-party relationship with Nintendo. The characters were released on 4 September 2019, along with a stage based on Spiral Mountain and Banjo-Kazooie musical arrangements, including one by original composer Grant Kirkhope.

== Stop 'N' Swop ==
Stop 'N' Swop menu with the six coloured mystery eggs and the ice key

Stop 'N' Swop is a feature from Banjo-Kazooie that was supposed to be a means of unlocking special content in Banjo-Tooie, Donkey Kong 64, and Conker's Bad Fur Day. Though it was shown in an ending sequence in Banjo-Kazooie, evidence suggests that it was never fully implemented due to the Nintendo 64 revisions completed in 1999 that kept the feature from being practical. The feature was widely publicised through a column published by Nintendo Power. Rare announced that special areas and items in the game could only be reached by completing certain tasks in its sequel, Banjo-Tooie. It was later discovered that Banjo-Kazooie contains seven special items which can be accessed using lengthy in-game cheat codes or by using a cheat cartridge. Once collected, these items would be viewable in a menu titled "Stop 'N' Swop". Even if the game is reset, all of the items will remain permanently.

=== History ===
An ending sequence in Banjo-Kazooie, should the player collect all 100 Jiggies in the game, indicated that two coloured eggs in the game would be put to use in the sequel Banjo-Tooie. There was also an inaccessible ice key shown in the sequence, which induced gamers to search for a way to get it. While only two eggs were shown in the sequence, hackers Alan "Ice Mario" Pierce and Mitchell "SubDrag" Kleiman of the Rare Witch Project fansite discovered in-game cheat codes to unlock a total of six different eggs and the ice key.

Other ways of getting the six eggs and key were previously discovered via the use of a cheat cartridge. Once acquired, these items would be viewable by all three game files, and would remain even after erasing the files.

In the years between the two Banjo-Kazooie games, Rare representatives were questioned on "Stop 'N' Swop" and how it would be implemented. Ken Lobb was reportedly unwilling to discuss how the connection would be made between the games.

Banjo-Tooie was released in 2000 and offered a way to retrieve the items without the need to acquire Banjo-Kazooie. The player would attain them by destroying in-game Banjo-Kazooie Game Paks. These eggs could then be brought to Heggy the hen to hatch. There were three eggs in total (i.e. the pink, yellow, and blue eggs), one of which was already with the hen, but which Kazooie had to hatch herself. The ice key, however, was to be used to obtain an item locked in an ice vault, containing a Mega Glowbo, which could turn Kazooie into a dragon. No explanation for "Stop 'N' Swop" was revealed in the game. Nintendo released a statement on the matter expressing that the feature "was not implemented in the game, and although we know there is a code that opens this menu, it does not do anything at all. And as much as I would like to be able to answer your question about why it was not implemented in the game, this is not information that our Consumer Service Department has access to."

In 2004, a patent filed by Rare was published which suggests that Stop 'N' Swop involved swapping cartridges with the power off to transfer data. The information would be momentarily retained by utilising the Rambus memory in the Nintendo 64. As a result of changes done to the Nintendo 64 systems produced in 1999, the system could no longer do this effectively.

In February 2004, fansite Rare-Extreme was invited to tour Rare HQ which was the first outsider tour of the studio since Rarenet's visit in 1999. When Rare's management was asked about the Stop 'N' Swop feature in a 2004 HG Tour, they pointed out that "It was never officially announced as being part of the game," and immediately requested that the tour "move on."

Another Stop 'N' Swop reference appeared in 2005's Banjo-Pilot. After completing most of the game, Cheato sells an item called "STOP 'N' SWOP" for 999 Cheato Pages. The only result of buying is Cheato saying: "So you want to know about Stop 'N' Swop, eh? I hope you're ready. Here goes...Why don't you stop annoying me and swop this game for a nice book or something?"

In 2008, MTV conducted an interview with Salvatore Fileccia, lead software engineer at Rare. Fileccia cited that the abandonment of Stop 'N' Swop was due to revisions made to the Nintendo 64 circuitry. He stated that older versions of the system would have given the player 10 seconds to successfully swap data between cartridges, while newer iterations of the console reduced this time to one second. Paul Machacek, a Rare software engineer, clarified that Nintendo shut down Stop 'N' Swop before Donkey Kong 64's release, anticipating the aforementioned circuitry changes as well as fearing hardware damage (a fear which Machacek claimed was unfounded), although the "Swopping" system was never fully removed from Kazooie. Rare did not initially plan to implement cheat codes for accessing the items, fearing that they could be shared with players that did not own Tooie.

In a 2007 interview with Retro Gamer, Rare employees told the magazine reporters that they may have to wait until the release of Banjo-Kazooie: Nuts & Bolts for the details of Stop 'N' Swop to be revealed. At Microsoft's E3 press conference on 14 July 2008, it was announced that the original Banjo-Kazooie would be made available through the Xbox Live Arcade (XBLA) and feature Stop 'N' Swop connectivity with Nuts & Bolts to unlock new features. Collecting Stop 'N' Swop items in Banjo-Kazooie causes special item crates to appear in Nuts & Bolts, which can be redeemed for special vehicle parts. It was revealed that the eggs and key in the XBLA version of Banjo-Kazooie would unlock bonus vehicle parts in Nuts & Bolts such as fuzzy dice.

On 27 January 2009, Rare announced that Banjo-Tooie would be released in April on XBLA and that the "original plan" for Stop 'N' Swop would be implemented. In the XBLA port of Banjo-Tooie, the six eggs and key from Banjo-Kazooie unlock the bonuses included in the original N64 version, as well as new content related to the Xbox 360. Using the Stop 'N' Swop items in Banjo-Tooie will also unlock seven additional vehicle blueprints in the "L.O.G.'s Lost Challenges" downloadable content for Nuts & Bolts. In place of the three preexisting eggs are gold, silver and bronze eggs. The three unlock achievements listed under a "Stop 'N' Swop II" submenu. Additional Stop 'N' Swop II achievements can be unlocked by completing specific objectives in the game. These achievements, however, currently serve no in-game or cross-game functionality.

In 2018, Paul Machacek clarified that Stop 'N' Swop was not only going to involve the two Banjo-Kazooie titles, but also other Rare titles planned for release on the Nintendo 64, including Donkey Kong 64, Conker's Bad Fur Day and Blast Corps (the latter was initially planned to release after Banjo-Kazooie as it was slated for Christmas 1997 before being delayed). In a 2020 interview conducted by Rare Gamer, Machacek stated that the six eggs included in the final release of Kazooie were each meant to correspond to a different Rare title, and that if a player could transfer the Ice Key through all of the games and back to Kazooie, some sort of "super-code" would be unlocked for a final, grand bonus. Documentation shared in December 2025 by Gregg Mayles reveals that connecting Donkey Kong 64 was planned to unlock special in-game statues, as well as Donkey Kong as a playable character in Tooie's multiplayer mode.

In 2026, new ports of Banjo-Kazooie and Banjo-Tooie were released for the Evercade line of products. The ports include cheat menus and hidden music players unlocked through acquisition of the Stop 'N' Swop items, which feature several previously unused music tracks.

== Reception ==
Aggregate review scores As of 18 June 2014.
Game	GameRankings	Metacritic
Banjo-Kazooie	(N64) 92.38% (X360) 80.88%	(N64) 92 (X360) 77
Banjo-Tooie	(N64) 91.31% (X360) 77.00%	(N64) 90 (X360) 73
Banjo-Kazooie: Grunty's Revenge	(GBA) 72.70%	(GBA) 72
Banjo-Pilot	(GBA) 66.78%	(GBA) 68
Banjo-Kazooie: Nuts & Bolts	(X360) 80.66%	(X360) 79

Following Banjo-Kazooie release in 1998, the series has been met with critical and commercial success. Websites such as Metacritic have marked the original two games as having received universal acclaim from critics. The original Nintendo 64 version sold 3.65 million copies worldwide as of 2021.

The fact that Banjo-Kazooie received high reviews from critics along with the fact that several planned features and worlds were ultimately scrapped from the game, led Rare to begin development of a sequel titled Banjo-Tooie, also for the Nintendo 64. Banjo-Tooie was released on 20 November 2000 to very positive reviews, and largely adopts the gameplay mechanics of its predecessor. Banjo-Tooie has sold 1,490,000 copies as of January 2019.

Later titles were not met with as much praise as the Nintendo 64 titles. Banjo-Kazooie: Grunty's Revenge was met with mixed reviews, as was the follow-up spinoff title Banjo-Pilot. Banjo-Kazooie would not receive a well-received title until the release of Banjo-Kazooie: Nuts & Bolts for the Xbox 360 in 2008, eight years after the last console game. Banjo-Kazooie: Nuts & Bolts received positive reviews from release according to Metacritic, but many die-hard Banjo-Kazooie fans felt they were let down by the game featuring a very separate gameplay style to the previous console games. Banjo-Kazooie: Nuts & Bolts sold 1.2 million sales at last count.

The re-releases of Banjo-Kazooie from 2008 and Banjo-Tooie from 2009 were met with more criticism than the original releases, with Banjo-Kazooie meeting mostly positive reviews and Banjo-Tooie being met with mixed reviews, both according to Metacritic.

== Legacy ==
=== Spiritual successor ===
In early 2015, a group of former Rare employees who worked on Banjo-Kazooie announced their formation of a new studio named Playtonic Games, planning a spiritual successor called Yooka-Laylee. The developer initially sought funding for the game via the Kickstarter crowdfunding platform; its initial funding goal of £175,000 was reached within thirty-eight minutes, eventually raising over £2 million by the time the campaign concluded. The game was released for Microsoft Windows, MacOS, Linux, PlayStation 4, Xbox One, and Nintendo Switch in 2017 to mixed reviews.
