= Banjo & Kazooie =

Video game character duo

- Banjo-Kazooie characters
- Banjo & Kazooie, as seen in Banjo-Tooie (2000)
- First game: Diddy Kong Racing (1997) (Banjo); Banjo-Kazooie (1998) (Kazooie)
- Created by: Gregg Mayles; Steve Mayles
- Designed by: Gregg Mayles
- Voiced by: Chris Sutherland; Steve Burke (fat Banjo, Banjo-Kazooie: Nuts & Bolts)

In-universe information
- Species: Brown bear (Banjo); Breegull (Kazooie)
- Gender: Male (Banjo); Female (Kazooie)

Banjo & Kazooie are the protagonists of the video game series Banjo-Kazooie, owned by the British video game company Rare. They were introduced in the original Banjo-Kazooie (1998). Banjo is a honeybear who is accompanied by Kazooie, a bird who is often seen seeking shelter in Banjo's backpack and emerging to perform various moves and attacks. The pair's numerous adventures usually pit them against the evil witch Gruntilda.

Banjo first made his solo debut as one of the playable characters in Diddy Kong Racing (1997). Decades after the release of their original game, Banjo and Kazooie gained widespread attention for their playable appearance in Nintendo's Super Smash Bros. Ultimate.

== Concept and design ==
The game that would become Banjo-Kazooie began in early development as Dream: Land of Giants, in which players would control a sword-wielding boy named Edson battling pirates. Later in development, Rare decided to heavily rework the premise, and the player character was initially changed to a rabbit before settling on a bear named Banjo. According to Rare, "We wanted the characters to primarily appeal to a younger audience but, at the same time, give them enough humour and attitude not to discourage older players."

The addition of Kazooie came as a result of Rare wanting to expand Banjo's abilities. According to Gregg Mayles, who served as the head designer for both characters, "We came up with the [...] idea that a pair of wings could appear from his backpack to help him perform a second jump. We also wanted Banjo to be able to run very fast when required [so] we added a pair of 'fast-running' legs that appeared from the bottom of the backpack. [And soon after] we came up with the logical conclusion that these could belong to another character, one that actually lived in Banjo's backpack." The characters' names were derived from Banjo and Kazuhito Yamauchi, the grandson and son respectively of then-president of Nintendo Hiroshi Yamauchi, and were given banjo and kazoo instruments to match. The kazoo was chosen for Kazooie because it was considered an annoying instrument, "much like the personality of the bird," Mayles explained. Instead of actual dialogue, all the characters in the game feature "mumbling" voices. This choice was made to convey their personalities without them actually speaking, as Rare felt the actual speech "could ruin the player's perception of the characters," as well as due to the limited development time available to implement the feature. The game's sequel, Banjo-Tooie, introduced the ability for the characters to separate and be controlled independently of one another, with each one able to perform unique abilities that they would not otherwise be able to while joined.

When Rare became a first-party developer for Microsoft's Xbox, character trademarks such as Banjo and Kazooie were retained by Rare. When redesigning the characters of Banjo and Kazooie for Banjo-Kazooie: Nuts & Bolts, Mayles and Bryan initially designed high-resolution characters for the protagonists, but Bryan recalled that they lacked "the charm" the original game held. Later during development, Bryan suggested that the characters in the game should appear cuboid, and thus finalized the designs with smooth edges, whilst retaining the two characters' original appearances. Banjo-Kazooie lead programmer Chris Sutherland has voiced both characters in all of their appearances.

== Appearances ==
=== Banjo-Kazooie series ===
Banjo is depicted as an affable male honey bear from the Spiral Mountain region of the Isle O' Hags. He is constantly accompanied by his best friend, Kazooie, a foul-tempered female bird of the fictional "Red-Crested Breegull" species who lives in his backpack. The pair first appeared together as the protagonists of 1998's Banjo-Kazooie, in which they worked together to rescue Banjo's younger sister Tooty from the evil witch Gruntilda. Banjo and Kazooie returned in Banjo-Tooie, working to prevent Gruntilda from draining the life force from the Isle O' Hags and get revenge for the death of their friend Bottles. In Banjo-Kazooie: Grunty's Revenge, set between Kazooie and Tooie, Banjo and Kazooie travel back in time to stop Gruntilda when she attempts to prevent the two from ever meeting. Both Banjo and Kazooie appear as individual playable characters in the racing game Banjo-Pilot. In Banjo-Kazooie: Nuts & Bolts, Banjo and Kazooie must compete with Gruntilda for ownership of Spiral Mountain in a contest organized by the Lord of Games, the creator of all video games.

=== Other appearances ===
Banjo was included as a playable racer in Diddy Kong Racing, prior to the release of Banjo-Kazooie. Banjo and Kazooie also appear as a playable racer in the Xbox 360 version of Sonic & Sega All-Stars Racing. Developer Sumo Digital collaborated with Rare for the character's inclusion, with Rare giving Sumo access to their asset library as well as designing and modeling Banjo and Kazooie's in-game vehicle. A character skin based on Banjo is available as downloadable content in various versions of Minecraft. Banjo and Kazooie made an appearance in an arm-waving SXSW crowd game in 2015.

Banjo and Kazooie also appear as a single playable fighter via downloadable content in the 2018 crossover fighting game, Super Smash Bros. Ultimate. Phil Spencer, head of the Xbox brand, stated that negotiating the characters' inclusion was an "easy deal to make" due to their strong third-party relationship with Nintendo. The characters were released on September 4, 2019, alongside a stage based on Spiral Mountain and Banjo-Kazooie musical arrangements, including one by original composer Grant Kirkhope. Diddy Kong Racing artist Paul Cunningham was responsible for Banjo and Kazooie's design in Ultimate. Rare studio head Craig Duncan explained that he had met with Nintendo at E3 2018 to discuss the characters' inclusion, then connected their teams because they thought it seemed like a great opportunity. In a later interview, Duncan shared that Minecraft had paved the way for the relationship between Nintendo and Microsoft that allowed for Banjo and Kazooie's inclusion. Masahiro Sakurai noted that the addition of Banjo and Kazooie as a playable fighter in Super Smash Bros. Ultimate happened "quite easily", despite their ownership by Microsoft. According to Sakurai, in an officially-sanctioned fan ballot held for Super Smash Bros. for Nintendo 3DS and Wii U in 2015, Banjo and Kazooie were the second most requested characters after Sora from Kingdom Hearts, which led to the characters' inclusion in Ultimate.

== Reception ==
Critics have praised the characters' unique and diverse speech patterns in the Banjo-Kazooie series. Nintendo Power remarked that the characters "have more of a loud-mouthed attitude than Mario and crew." In Banjo-Pilot, Eurogamer and VideoGamer both noted that characters such as Banjo were relatively obscure and would likely only be recognized by those who played the N64 Banjo games. In Banjo-Kazooie: Grunty's Revenge, GameZone appreciated that Rare brought "Banjo's hilarious and indescribable jibber-jabber" back. Edge claimed that its characters are "impossible to dislike." Samuel James Riley of GamesRadar listed Banjo and Kazooie as the best video game duo, and further stated that, unlike some duos, Banjo and Kazooie's particular quirks really do work to improve one another. Nick Gillett of The Guardian listed Kazooie as the best video game sidekick, and further stated that Kazooie's relationship with Banjo is a pleasing inversion of the normally acquiescent sidekick schtick. Gus Turner of Complex Networks listed Banjo and Kazooie as one of the best-forgotten video game heroes, and further stated that "Rare's animal duo caught on in a big way with N64 gamers." Ravi Sinha of GamingBolt listed Banjo & Kazooie's designs in Banjo Kazooie: Nuts and Bolts at fourth in their "Worst Video Game Character Design" list, stating that "If you played Banjo Kazooie and their intermittent sequel, the dynamic duo came across as cute but not overbearingly so. Kazooie's biting wit and Banjo's friendly nature felt just right. So of course, Banjo Kazooie: Nuts and Bolts had to turn them into more "cutting edge" figures. Kazooie is practically dripping sass while Banjo looks, well, shady. Thanks, Microsoft!" Fan art and numerous fan games featuring the characters have been created over the years.

Before being announced for Super Smash Bros. Ultimate, Banjo and Kazooie were a popular choice for inclusion in the roster, and were suggested for addition by fans as well as gaming websites, including Screen Rant, IGN, Metro, and Paste. Banjo and Kazooie's popularity has increased, particularly due to the reactions their fans had to their addition to the Super Smash Bros. Ultimate roster. Steve Mayles, a former artist at Rare and the original artist of the characters, said that the addition of the Banjo and Kazooie to the Super Smash Bros. series could end up saving the Banjo-Kazooie series. Mayles also praised the artwork and animation of the duo in Smash Bros. Ultimate, and was surprised by the reception that fans had to the addition of the characters. Cecilia D'Anastasio of Kotaku said that Banjo and Kazooie's appearances in Smash Bros. are puzzling, criticizing their slow moves and lag, and deemed that the characters aren't as good as they seem. Bryce Johnson of Screen Rant put Banjo and Kazooie in eighth on his ranked list of Super Smash Bros. Ultimate DLC characters. Mitchell Saltzman of IGN praised the design of the characters, saying that it "stays true to their N64 designs while simultaneously making them more expressive than ever." David Lozada of GameRevolution claimed that Banjo and Kazooie's reveal was "weird".

Various merchandise of the characters has been released, including an amiibo released in 2020, a figure by Totaku, and collectibles and vinyl figures by Youtooz.
