= Sonic & Sega All-Stars Racing =

2010 video game

- Developer: Sumo Digital
- Publisher: Sega
- Director: Craig Duncan
- Producers: Gwilym Hughe; Sakae Osumi
- Designer: Travis Ryan
- Artist: Dominic Hood
- Series: Sega All-Stars
- Platforms: Wii; PlayStation 3; Xbox 360; Nintendo DS; Windows; Mac OS X; Arcade; iOS; Android; BlackBerry; Java ME
- Release: February 23, 2010: DS, PS3, Wii, Windows, Xbox 360; NA: February 23, 2010; EU: February 26, 2010; NA: March 3, 2010 (Windows); AU: March 4, 2010 Arcade; NA: May 25, 2011 iOS; NA: June 18, 2011; JP: November 2011 Mac OS X; WW: April 4, 2013 Android; WW: September 18, 2013; JP: September 25, 2013 BlackBerry; WW: December 20, 2013
- Genre: Kart racing game
- Modes: Single-player, multiplayer
- Arcade system: Sega RingWide

Sonic & Sega All-Stars Racing (Note: Japanese: ソニック&(アンド)セガオールスターズレーシング, Hepburn: Sonikku ando Sega Ōru-Sutāzu Rēshingu) is a 2010 kart racing video game developed by Sumo Digital and published by Sega. It was released for Wii, Xbox 360, PlayStation 3, Nintendo DS, and Windows, featuring characters from multiple Sega franchises. The game is the third title in the Sega All-Stars series, preceded by Sega Superstars Tennis. A mobile version was developed by Gameloft, and released for iOS in June 2011, as a paid download. A version for OS X was released by Feral Interactive in April 2013.

The game received mostly positive reviews from critics. A sequel, Sonic & All-Stars Racing Transformed, was released in 2012, featuring more characters and representing a wide-variety of Sega-owned franchises.

== Gameplay ==
An example of gameplay in Sonic & Sega All-Stars Racing

The game is a mascot kart racing game, similar to other games in its genre like Mario Kart, Konami Krazy Racers and Crash Team Racing. Players can choose to race as one of 20 characters from various Sega franchises such as Sonic the Hedgehog, Crazy Taxi, Super Monkey Ball and Fantasy Zone. Characters race through various race circuits themed on different Sega franchises and collect power-ups to boost their speed or hamper their opponents. The items have a rock-paper-scissors effect, in which certain items can be used to defend against others. Also, on occasions when players get three of one item, they can choose to fire or activate them at the same time. Additional boost can be earned by successfully executing drifts (with longer drifts earning more boost), or performing tricks while in midair. Like Sumo's previous Sega game, Sega Superstars Tennis, each character has a special ability (called an "All-Star Move") unique to them that they may use to their advantage (such as Sonic transforming into Super Sonic and AiAi riding in his monkey ball), which they can obtain if they are running behind in the race. The duration of each All-Star move depends on the character's current position. Due to network latency issues, All-Star Moves are not possible in online races.

Vehicles are separated into 3 different categories: cars, bikes and hovercraft. As the terrain on the tracks will vary, vehicles can be either assisted or hindered by the surfaces they drive upon. Cars vary in weight and speed, with some performing better on some terrains than others. Bikes have fast acceleration and can also perform ground tricks for extra boost, but can easily be pushed by heavier vehicles. Hovercraft are not affected by any terrain and are able to perform multiple tricks after a jump, but they have poorer handling and have low acceleration. All of the vehicles also have their own specific engine sounds.

By playing through the game, players can earn Sega Miles that can be spent in the in-game shop to unlock additional content such as characters, tracks, and music. The game features a total of 24 tracks based on locations from Sonic Heroes, Super Monkey Ball: Banana Blitz, Billy Hatcher and the Giant Egg, Jet Set Radio Future, Samba de Amigo, and The House of the Dead.

There are four single player modes: Grand Prix, Single Race, Missions and Time Trials, while modes for split-screen multiplayer, playable with up to 4 players, include Race, Knockout, King of the Hill, Grab, and Capture the Chao. The game also has customizable multiplayer options for up to 8 players online (4 players on DS version, with no online support for PC version).

The soundtrack for the game consists of various old and new tracks from the various Sonic and Sega franchises, though it also features original songs by various artists including Richard Jacques. Each course starts with one track, with more being unlocked as players earn Sega Miles. The Nintendo DS version of the game features MIDI versions of the tracks arranged by Allister Brimble and Anthony Putson of Orchestral Media Developments.

The Wii version supports multiple control schemes, including motion control and use of the Wii Wheel and Classic Controller, while the DS version is compatible with the Rumble Pak accessory. The arcade version features less content, with only 13 characters and tracks, and includes a ticket redemption feature. The Java ME version only includes 10 characters and 8 tracks.

=== Characters ===
Sonic & Sega All-Stars Racing features 20 playable characters, 12 of which must be unlocked through gameplay. Three additional characters originating from non-Sega properties are available only on specific consoles, while two additional characters were released as paid downloadable content for the Xbox 360 and PlayStation 3 versions.

- AiAi (Note: Available in the Java ME version)
- Alex Kidd (Note: Not available in the arcade version)
- Amigo
- Amy
- Avatar (Note: Exclusive to the Xbox 360 version)
- B.D. Joe
- Banjo & Kazooie
- Beat
- Big
- Billy Hatcher
- Bonanza Bros. (Note: In the Nintendo DS version, only the former character is considered available; the latter only then appears and replaces them when their "All-Star Move" is performed.)
- ChuChus
- Dr. Eggman
- Jacky and Akira
- Knuckles
- Metal Sonic (Note: Downloadable content for Xbox 360 and PlayStation 3)
- Mii (Note: Exclusive to the Wii version)
- Opa-Opa
- Ryo
- Ryo – Forklift
- Shadow
- Sonic
- Tails
- Ulala
- Zobio & Zobiko

== Development ==
Following the release of Sega Superstars Tennis, Sumo Digital decided to do a racing title, based on their experience with recent Out Run titles. In an early prototype of the game, Sonic raced on foot, Dr. Eggman rode an Eggpod with legs, Tails flew in a biplane, Amy Rose drove a car, and Gilius Thunderhead from Golden Axe rode one of the Chickenleg creatures from the game. This version, however, was reportedly not fun to play, largely due to the varying sizes between the different characters, but also because the drift mechanic wouldn't work with racers who were on foot. It was later revised so that everyone would be in cars, bikes, or modified flyers. The game is also the last in the series to utilize the Sonic the Hedgehog voice cast from 4Kids Entertainment that was first introduced with the English-language release of Sonic X in 2003 (with the exception of Mike Pollock who continues to voice Dr. Eggman).

At Summer of Sonic 2009, Steve Lycett, executive producer and Travis Ryan, lead designer of Sonic & Sega All-Stars Racing were present for a Q&A session. A PlayStation 3 demo was also available for attendees to play. It was identical to the Comic-Con demo. On November 25, 2009, a special press event about the game was held in France, where the DS version made its playable debut.

Banjo & Kazooie from the Banjo-Kazooie series appear as a playable character exclusive to the Xbox 360 version of the game, based on their appearance in Banjo-Kazooie: Nuts & Bolts. Sumo collaborated with Banjo-Kazooie development studio Rare for the character's inclusion, with Rare giving Sumo access to their asset library as well as designing and modeling Banjo and Kazooie's in-game vehicle. The Xbox 360 version also features playable Avatars, while the Wii version includes playable Miis.

Three demos of the game were released: The first, for the Xbox 360, was released on the Xbox Live Marketplace on February 8, 2010. The second, for the Nintendo DS, was released via the Nintendo Channel on February 15, 2010. The third, for the PlayStation 3, was made available on the PlayStation Network Store on February 18, 2010.

=== Planned characters ===
ToeJam & Earl were originally planned to be in Sonic & Sega All-Stars Racing as a duo driving their spaceship, but Sega could not come to terms with ToeJam & Earl Productions co-founder Greg Johnson. However, fans have called and mass-emailed Johnson for his characters' return. He has responded on the official Sega forums under the pseudonym 'Big Earl' stating "I'll give it another try and see if I can get the homies at Sega to talk again on the phone." He later mentioned that the duo will not be appearing in the game, since it is too late in development.

In its prototype form, Gilius Thunderhead from Golden Axe was a playable character who rode one of the Chickenleg monsters from the game. In his developer diary, Lycett makes it clear that this does not confirm him as a final character. This is the case with Gilius, as he did not make the cut into the final roster. Lycett has also talked about Vyse from Skies of Arcadia in an interview with Gamereactor. Both Gilius and Vyse would later be playable in the game's sequel, Sonic & All-Stars Racing Transformed. Segata Sanshiro was also considered as a possible character, riding a Sega Saturn, though he did not end up in the roster. Early in development, Mario was considered as a Wii-exclusive addition, but Sega decided against it so as not to cause cross-contamination with its Mario and Sonic series.

Lycett has also mentioned there will be various cameo appearances from other Sega characters who didn't make it in the playable roster. Following a successful fan campaign for the character's inclusion, Nights was integrated into the game as the flagman.

=== Downloadable content ===
Producer Omar Woodley confirmed in an interview that there would be DLC for the Xbox 360 and PlayStation 3 versions of the game. Lycett has mentioned that the Wii won't receive any DLC due to storage limits. As a pre-order bonus for the Xbox 360 and PlayStation 3 versions in PAL regions, an alternate version of Ryo Hazuki was made available to download in which he would drive his forklift outside his All-Star move as his standard vehicle. This character was later made available for purchase on April 1, 2010.

Exclusive DLC for the Xbox 360 version include a game add-on that unlocks all characters and tracks without using SEGA miles, released March 16, 2010. Avatar content for the game was released on the Xbox Live Marketplace on March 25, 2010. A pack containing Metal Sonic as a playable character and the "Death Egg Hangar" track, with Ristar as a cameo appearance, was officially released on the Xbox Live Marketplace on April 8, 2010, and the PlayStation Store on April 22, 2010.

== Reception ==
Reception

Aggregate score
| Aggregator | Score | | | | | |
| Aggregator | DS | iOS | PC | PS3 | Wii | Xbox 360 |
|---|---|---|---|---|---|---|
| Metacritic | 78/100 | 89/100 | 65/100 | 77/100 | 78/100 | 75/100 |

Review scores
| Publication | Score | | | | | |
| Publication | DS | iOS | PC | PS3 | Wii | Xbox 360 |
|---|---|---|---|---|---|---|
| Destructoid | N/A | 7/10 | N/A | N/A | N/A | 7/10 |
| Eurogamer | N/A | N/A | N/A | 6/10 | 6/10 | 6/10 |
| Game Informer | N/A | N/A | N/A | 7.75/10 | 7.5/10 | N/A |
| GamesMaster | 70% | N/A | N/A | 83% | 83% | 83% |
| GameSpot | 8/10 | N/A | N/A | 8/10 | 8/10 | 8/10 |
| GamesRadar+ | 3.5/5 | N/A | N/A | N/A | N/A | 4/5 |
| IGN | 8/10 | N/A | N/A | 8/10 | 8/10 | 8/10 |
| Nintendo Life | 8/10 | N/A | N/A | N/A | 8/10 | N/A |
| Nintendo Power | 6/10 | N/A | N/A | N/A | 8/10 | N/A |
| Nintendo World Report | 7.5/10 | N/A | N/A | N/A | 8/10 | N/A |
| Pocket Gamer | 3.5/5 | 5/5 | N/A | N/A | N/A | N/A |
| TouchArcade | N/A | 4.5/5 | N/A | N/A | N/A | N/A |
| VideoGamer.com | N/A | 9/10 | N/A | N/A | N/A | N/A |

The game received mostly positive scores. IGN gave both the console and DS versions 8/10 each, calling it 'a clone that gets it right.' GameSpot also gave it 8/10, praising its responsive controls and excellent track design. Kotaku called it a competent racer which evokes fond memories, although laments that the tracks and music selection don't delve as deep into Sega lore as the character roster. GameTrailers gave the game 8.0 as well, praising its track design and addictive gameplay. GamesMaster gave the game 83% for the console versions and 70% for the DS version, calling it 'the best kart racer on 360/PS3, but not quite the Mario Kart-beater we hoped for'. Nintendo Power gave the Wii version 8/10 and the DS version 6/10. Official Nintendo Magazine gave both the DS and Wii version 75%. Wiiloveit.com gave the game a 27/30 calling it an "excellent kart racer", praising its "natural" drifting mechanics, the varied multiplayer modes, as well as the large amount of "fan service" that exists in the game. The online incorporation was praised, however it was also commented that it could've been stronger had there been additional modes, a stronger setup, and some sort of a ranking system. GamesRadar gave the console versions of the game 8/10, praising its pick-up-and-play fun while criticising its uninspired weapons, whereas the DS version got 7/10.

By March 2010, Sonic & Sega All-Stars Racing had sold 1.07 million copies worldwide, on the PS3, Xbox 360, Wii and DS. On iOS, the game hit more than 16.7 million downloads in North America and Europe as of 2013, including free downloads for a week in June 2012.

== Sequel ==
At the 2012 Toy Fair in New York City, Sega revealed a new toyline based on the game and confirmed to Kotaku that a sequel was in production, to be revealed later in 2012. The game was later announced as Sonic & All-Stars Racing Transformed, and was released for Wii U, PlayStation 3, PlayStation Vita, and Xbox 360 in 2012, Nintendo 3DS and Microsoft Windows in 2013 and iOS and Android in 2014.
