= Diddy Kong Racing =

1997 video game

- North American cover art
- Developer: Rare
- Publishers: Rare (N64); Nintendo (DS)
- Director: Lee Schuneman
- Producer: Chris Stamper
- Programmer: Robert Harrison
- Artist: Kevin Bayliss
- Composer: David Wise
- Series: Donkey Kong
- Platforms: Nintendo 64; Nintendo DS
- Release: Nintendo 64; JP: 21 November 1997; EU: 21 November 1997; NA: 24 November 1997; Nintendo DS; NA: 5 February 2007; AU: 19 April 2007; EU: 20 April 2007
- Genre: Kart racing
- Modes: Single-player, multiplayer

Diddy Kong Racing is a 1997 kart racing game developed and published by Rare for the Nintendo 64. The game revolves around Diddy Kong and his friends' attempt to defeat the intergalactic antagonist, a wizard pig named Wizpig, through winning a series of races. The player takes control of any of the featured characters throughout the game. Diddy Kong Racing features five worlds with four racetracks each, and the ability to drive a car, hovercraft, or pilot an aeroplane.

Development began after the release of Killer Instinct 2 (1996), and was intended to be an adventure game known as Wild Cartoon Kingdom in its early stages. As time progressed, the focus of development shifted from a Walt Disney World-influenced racing game to a unique title named Pro-Am 64, in which Nintendo had no involvement. Due to the delays of Banjo-Kazooie, Rare felt that they needed a stronger intellectual property to attract a wider audience for a game scheduled to release before Christmas 1997, thus making the decision to centre the game around Diddy Kong.

Diddy Kong Racing received critical acclaim upon release. The graphics, audio, and gameplay were among the most lauded aspects, while some criticism was directed at the game's repetition. It has sold 4.8 million copies since its release and stands as the Nintendo 64's eighth best-selling game. A sequel named Donkey Kong Racing was in development for the GameCube, but was abandoned in August 2002, one month before Microsoft purchased Rare for £375 million. An enhanced remake for the Nintendo DS titled Diddy Kong Racing DS was released worldwide in early 2007; it is the most recent Nintendo-published game to be developed by Rare.

== Gameplay ==
Timber the Tiger racing in Fossil Canyon. From left to right clockwise, the interface displays the player's current position, number of laps, bananas, time, track outline, and held power-up.

In Diddy Kong Racing, players can choose one of ten characters, who have access to three different vehicles: car, hovercraft and aeroplane. The car is an all-round vehicle, but it is the slowest on certain surfaces like sand and water. The hovercraft is designed for both sand and water areas, but lacks in acceleration and manoeuvrability. The aeroplane is designed to access aerial areas; it is good at acceleration and manoeuvring, but has the slowest speed. Each racetrack has a set of boosters known as "zippers" that temporarily boost the player's speed, as well as featuring regenerating balloons of various colours that provide power-ups. There are five different types of balloons: red, blue, green, yellow, and rainbow. Red balloons grant missiles to attack racers ahead, blue balloons grant a speed boost, yellow balloons grant shields to protect the player from attacks, green balloons grant deployable traps to delay other racers, and rainbow balloons grant a magnet ability that brings the player closer to the nearest racer. If multiple balloons of the same colour are picked up, the power-up is upgraded to a more powerful version. A total of two upgrades are available for each balloon. Additionally, racetracks contain non-regenerating bananas that add to speed when they are picked up. A maximum of ten bananas will improve the speed, but can also be obtained to prevent other players from gaining speed. If a racer gets hit, two bananas are deducted.

In "Adventure Mode", players control the racer of their choice to progress through the story. Players begin in the hub world, which links five interconnected worlds; Dino Domain, Snowflake Mountain, Sherbet Island, Dragon Forest, and Future Fun Land. The worlds are opened up by collecting balloons, except for Future Fun Land, which is unlocked after defeating Wizpig for the first time and rank 1st place in all four Trophy Races of the original worlds. Each world contains four racetracks, an unlockable battle stage, and a race against a boss character. If the player defeats Wizpig in Future Fun Land, obtains all amulet pieces and collect all the gold medals, the player will be able to play in a mode called "Adventure 2". In this mode, all the balloons change colour to platinum and the tracks are inverted from left to right. The game also features four battle modes which consist of two deathmatch maps, a capture-the-flag-style battle and a mode which involves opponents capturing eggs. The battle modes are not initially selectable, and must be unlocked by collecting special keys hidden in each of the worlds.

== Plot ==
The plot of Diddy Kong Racing is detailed in the instruction booklet. Timber the Tiger's parents go on holiday and leave their son in charge of the island they live on, prompting him and his friends to organize a race. Their enjoyment is interrupted when a sinister intergalactic pig-wizard named Wizpig arrives at Timber's Island and attempts to take it over after having conquered his own planet. He turns the island's four guardians (Tricky the Triceratops, Bluey the Walrus, Bubbler the Octopus, and Smokey the Dragon) into his henchmen. The only solution available to the island's inhabitants is to defeat Wizpig in an elaborate series of races that involve cars, hovercraft, and aeroplanes. Drumstick the Rooster, the best racer on the island, fails this challenge and is transformed into a frog by Wizpig's magic.

Timber hires a team of eight racers: Diddy Kong, the first recruit; Conker the Squirrel and Banjo the Bear, recruited by Diddy; Krunch the Kremling, Diddy's enemy who follows after him; Tiptup the Turtle, T.T. the Stopwatch, Pipsy the Mouse, and Bumper the Badger, all inhabitants of Timber's island. Aided by Taj, an Indian elephant-like genie residing on the island, they eventually complete all of Wizpig's challenges and confront Wizpig himself in a race and defeat him. Shortly afterward, Drumstick is turned back into a rooster, and Wizpig leaves for his home planet, Future Fun Land. Fearing that Wizpig will again attempt to invade Timber's Island, the islanders travel to Future Fun Land for a second challenge. When Wizpig loses the second race, the rocket he rides on malfunctions and launches him to the moon. However, an additional cutscene reveals Wizpig's spaceship flying through the sky, unscathed.

== Development ==
Nintendo enjoyed the fact that we chose Diddy Kong over Donkey Kong; I think that it was us trying to build on the fact that Diddy was ours, and DK was theirs [Nintendo's].

— Lee Musgrave in an interview with Nintendo Life, February 2014

Development of the game began after the release of Killer Instinct 2, in which a team was split into making Killer Instinct Gold for the Nintendo 64 and a new racing game for that console. During development, the game (initially a prehistoric time-traveller real-time strategy game) became influenced by Walt Disney World and soon evolved into an adventure game called Wild Cartoon Kingdom and later Adventure Racers, with which Nintendo had no involvement. The game would have allowed the playable characters to wander around outside of their vehicle in a theme park-inspired hub world. Some elements from the game's prehistoric time-traveller phase were retained, including its wooly mammoths. Around this time, Kevin Bayliss and programmer Chris Tilston worked on an adventure game prototype inspired by Disney's The Lion King, which had Bayliss' character Timber the Tiger (inspired by Kellogg's' Frosted Flakes mascot Tony the Tiger's son Tony Jr., Simba, and a tiger cub that he pet with his girlfriend at the time) clambering around over terrain, which was folded into the Adventure Racers design concept. In June 1997, the game was altered to Pro-Am 64, an unrelated follow-up to the NES racing game R.C. Pro-Am. According to Lee Schuneman and Bayliss, the Pro-Am 64 project had Timber as the main character, and featured three-wheeled trikes in contrast to radio-controlled cars. Other characters created for the project included Tiptup the Turtle (whose name was repurposed from a different turtle character in the canceled Project Dream), Bumper the Badger (originally colored blue), Drumstick the Rooster (inspired by the "Cosmic Cockerel" mascot in Software Farm's logo in the 1982 ZX81 video game Forty Niner, Foghorn Leghorn and the chickens from The Muppet Show, and originally without overalls), and Krash the Crocodile. A kangaroo character named Roo was planned to be included, with her boxing gloves reused from a Thai boxer character that Bayliss had modelled for an unmade Killer Instinct game, but was eventually replaced with Pipsy the Mouse. Pipsy's design (initially with pink fur and yellow attire) was a modified version of the main character from the canceled game Astro Mouse. The characters were planned to have expressions in-game, but this idea was dropped due to polygon limitations.

With Banjo-Kazooie being delayed until the summer of 1998, the team was adamant for a release of an AAA video game in time for 1997's Christmas season. With the change in release schedule, some at Rare felt that Pro-Am 64 did not have a strong enough intellectual property. Thus Rare changed the licence to feature Diddy Kong. According to Lee Musgrave, Rare chose to use Diddy Kong rather than Donkey Kong, and Nintendo "enjoyed" the decision. Once the intellectual property was changed, the team was left to adapt the visual aesthetics of the game and packaging before it could be released. Krash was slightly altered to be a Kremling, and was renamed "Krunch". Musgrave recalled that the ultimate goal of the game was to make it "run as fast" as Mario Kart 64, which proved difficult during development as the latter game utilised 2D character sprites whereas Diddy Kong Racing used fully 3D models. Musgrave later attributed the success of the overall project to the "small team" of 14 people who worked on it. In an October 2012 interview, Musgrave said that Timber would have been the main character of Pro-Am 64 had the intellectual property for Diddy Kong Racing not been conceived. Two of the characters who featured in Diddy Kong Racing, Banjo the Bear and Conker the Squirrel, starred in games (Banjo-Kazooie and Conker's Bad Fur Day, respectively) which were unveiled to the public before Diddy Kong Racing, at the June 1997 Electronic Entertainment Expo (E3), but ultimately not released until after Diddy Kong Racing. Rare stated that they chose not to exhibit Diddy Kong Racing at E3 because of the proprietary animation technology used in the game.

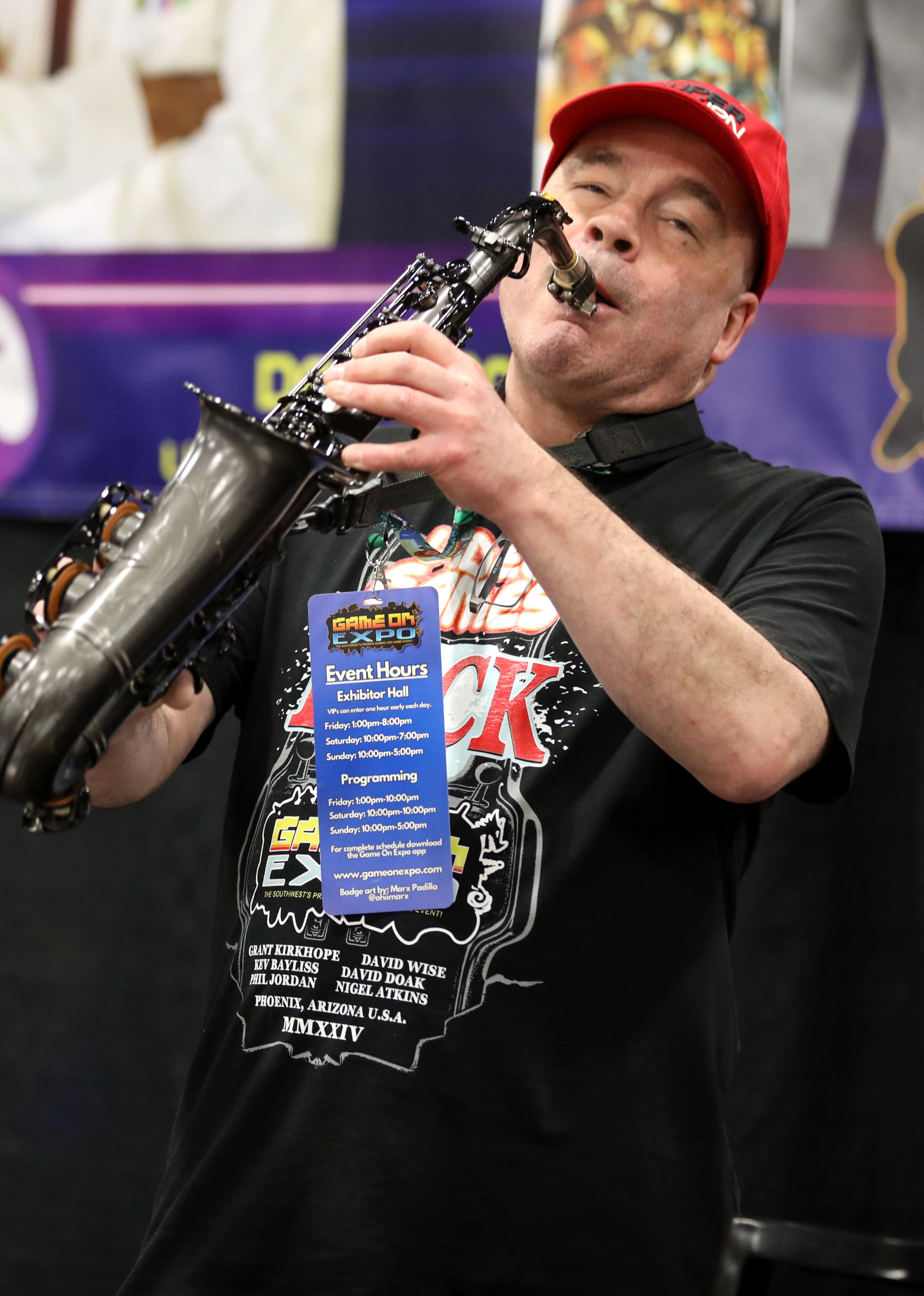
David Wise (pictured in 2024) composed the game's soundtrack.

The game's soundtrack was composed by David Wise. The soundtrack was first released in Japan on 1 April 1998, with 42 tracks, while a version of the album was released in Europe with the same number of tracks. For its United States release, only 16 tracks were featured. The disc itself was specially shaped in the form of Diddy Kong's head, which was unplayable in certain CD players. The sound effects were created by Graeme Norgate. Voices were provided by Kevin Bayliss (Bubbler, Wizpig), Johnni Christensen (Tiptup, Smokey), Eveline Novakovic (Pipsy), Keith Rabbette (Bluey), Lee Ray (Drumstick, Taj), Lee Schuneman (Bumper), Chris Seavor (Conker), Dean Smith (T.T.), Joe Stamper Jr. (Timber, Kid Background Voices), Kimberly Stamper (Kid Background Voices), and Chris Sutherland (Diddy Kong, Banjo, Krunch, Tricky).

=== Release ===
Due to most of the Nintendo 64's planned 1997 Christmas season line-up being delayed until 1998, Diddy Kong Racing became the main Nintendo 64 release for the holiday shopping season, and a majority of Nintendo's $200 million advertising budget for the entire year was allocated to promoting the game. The game had a $20 million marketing budget in North America. Diddy Kong Racing also held the distinction of being the only game in the North American Christmas season line-up for which development was contracted by Nintendo; the other two first-party Nintendo 64 games in the line-up, Bomberman 64 and Mischief Makers, were both licensed from Japanese third-party publishers.

== Reception ==
Reception

Aggregate scores
Aggregator	Score	
Aggregator	DS	N64
GameRankings	67%	89%
Metacritic	63/100	88/100

Review scores
Publication	Score	
Publication	DS	N64
AllGame	N/A	4.5/5
Edge	N/A	9/10
Electronic Gaming Monthly	N/A	9/10, 8.5/10, 9.5/10, 9/10
Famitsu	N/A	7/10, 7/10, 8/10, 8/10
Game Informer	N/A	8.5/10
GameSpot	6.7/10	6.6/10
GameTrailers	8.6/10	N/A
IGN	7.1/10	8.4/10
N64 Magazine	N/A	90%
Next Generation	N/A	4/5
Nintendo Life	7/10	8/10

The game received critical acclaim upon release. The Nintendo 64 version holds an aggregate score of 89% at GameRankings based on 20 reviews and 88 at Metacritic based on 15 reviews, whereas the Nintendo DS remake received a score of 67% at GameRankings based on 42 reviews and a score of 63 at Metacritic, based on 39 reviews. Diddy Kong Racing sold approximately 4.5 million copies worldwide; which included 3.78 million copies sold in the United States and PAL regions, and 653,928 copies in Japan. At the 1999 Milia festival in Cannes, it took home a "Gold" prize for revenues above €15 million in the European Union during the previous year. It stands as the Nintendo 64's eighth best-selling game, and broke one million units sold in the United States within three weeks of its release.

The graphics and gameplay were the most praised aspects of the game. Some critics noted how it minimised pop-up without resorting to the use of distance fog. Jeff Gerstmann of GameSpot disputed this, saying that the game has both pop-up and distance fog in amounts comparable to the average Nintendo 64 game. He nonetheless stated that the game was a "pleasure to look at" and praised the detail of the tracks. Doug Perry of IGN heralded the visuals as the most "spectacular of its kind", and praised Rare's ability to master dynamic animation through enabling polygons to span larger surfaces without loss of framerate. Furthermore, Perry stated that the game's technical achievements were enough to leave "even the most critical Japanese gamer [to] look upon with smiling eyes".

Although Crispin Boyer opened his review of the game for Electronic Gaming Monthly (EGM) with the warning "Don't dismiss this out-of-the-blue racer as a Mario Kart 64 clone", most reviews compared the two games. Gerstmann suspected Nintendo of rushing Diddy Kong Racing to market in order to fill a quarter left vacant by delays of other Nintendo games, and argued it was much too soon after Mario Kart 64's debut to release such a similar game. Other critics, including Boyer's EGM co-reviewers, focused on Diddy Kong Racing's perceived superiority to Mario Kart 64. Dan Hsu of EGM said it "beats Mario Kart 64 in every department", particularly mentioning the superior balance and level designs. Edge praised the adventure and progression aspect of the game, stating that the game's single-player mode is "everything Mario Kart 64 should have been." Andy McNamara and Paul Anderson of Game Informer felt that the game's standing was affected by the crowded racing game market on the Nintendo 64, with Anderson faulting its lack of innovation, though Andrew Reiner of the same publication commended the three vehicle types and boss races for adding variety. The four reviewers of Famitsu compared the game to both Super Mario 64 and Mario Kart 64 with the reviewers commenting that it was derivative of both games, and more difficult than the latter game. One player said that the difficulty made unlocking courses as satisfying as collecting stars in Super Mario 64.

The character designs met with varied opinions. EGM's Shawn Smith praised the characters as "hilarious". Next Generation, by contrast, said the character designs are "pathetic and obvious, molded from the same cookie cutter as Banjo-Kazooie and Conker", noting the formulaic use of anthropomorphic animal characters and the simplistic application of each animal's characteristics to gameplay. Perry felt that the vocals of characters in the game were "heartwarming" and "comical", while also stating that "some of the characters are just too damn cute and are certain to annoy older gamers."

Overall assessments of the game were mostly positive. GamePro gave it a 4.5 out of 5 for sound and a perfect 5.0 in control, graphics, and fun factor, calling it "a feverishly fun Nintendo 64 racer that combines elements of Mario Kart 64, Wave Race 64, and Pilotwings 64 into one spectacular game." EGM named it "Game of the Month", with its four reviewers lauding the challenging gameplay and numerous objectives to tackle. Gerstmann instead counted the latter as the game's greatest weakness, arguing that having to repeatedly play through the same courses with slightly different objectives makes the game excessively repetitive. He concluded that the game is far better than Mario Kart 64, but the repetitiveness "ultimately kills it." Next Generation fell more in line with the majority, remarking that the combination of racing and adventure elements works well, and that "Diddy Kong Racing shows Rare's pure craftmanship, displaying keen subtleties that eventually win players over."

In a retrospective review, Andrew Donaldson of Nintendo Life stated that the game was visually "incredibly vibrant" and "captivating" for a game of the early Nintendo 64 era. Scott McCall of AllGame acknowledged its only shortcoming was its "excessive" amount of clipping, although he admitted it was not "unbearable". He praised the wide range of audio in the game, including its voice acting and soundtrack; he heralded the music as "interesting" and "fitting" to its race tracks, also considering it superior to that of Mario Kart 64. Donaldson criticised game's presentation as too "cutesy", especially in terms of the characters' voices. However, he praised the "upbeat" and "catchy" soundtrack, saying that each track had its own unique tune to suit the distinct environment. In 2009, Official Nintendo Magazine ranked the game 79th on a list of the greatest Nintendo games of all time.

EGM named Diddy Kong Racing "Racing Game of the Year" at its 1997 Editors' Choice Awards. Diddy Kong Racing was awarded with "Console Racing Game of the Year" by the Academy of Interactive Arts & Sciences in 1998, beating Mario Kart 64, Moto Racer and NASCAR 98.

== Legacy ==
=== Cancelled sequel and spin-offs ===
After the release of Diddy Kong Racing, Rare refined the racing engine for use in their subsequent N64 racing game, Mickey's Speedway USA (2000). Rare then began development on a sequel named Donkey Kong Racing for the GameCube, which featured Donkey Kong as the titular character. A pre-rendered CG video of the game was shown at E3 2001, which displayed a parody of the speederbike scene from Return of the Jedi. According to Lee Musgrave, the game featured a unique mechanic which involved riding on animals rather than driving vehicles. The player could switch between different types of animals mid-race; larger animals could destroy obstacles, whereas smaller ones allowed more manoeuvrability. Development of Donkey Kong Racing was cancelled when Nintendo turned down the opportunity to purchase its remaining 51 percent stake in Rare, and the developer was bought out by Microsoft for £375 million in 2002.

After the buyout, Rare took what had been done with Donkey Kong Racing and created a prototype for the Xbox which expanded into an adventure game similar to the original setup of Diddy Kong Racing. Musgrave stated that the concept was essentially "built from scratch" and featured a limited multiplayer version at one point. The concept was in development over 18 months and evolved from being an animal-orientated racing game to an open-world game with Tamagotchi-style features, in which nurturing animals was a "key mechanic". By this point, Donkey Kong Racing had evolved into Sabreman Stampede, part of Rare's Sabreman series. Sabreman Stampede was set for release on the Xbox 360, but was cancelled due to a lack of focus and Rare's unfamiliarity with the hardware.

Aside from Donkey Kong Racing, two other sequels to Diddy Kong Racing were in development. One, named Diddy Kong Pilot, with planes as the only vehicle, was planned for a release on the Game Boy Advance. Originally announced alongside Donkey Kong Racing at E3 2001, the game became Banjo-Pilot after Nintendo sold their share of Rare to Microsoft. At the time of its announcement, the game featured the ability to play using a tilt function as well as a D-pad, and contained at least five tracks. The other, titled Diddy Kong Racing Adventure, was a rejected pitch made by Climax Studios for the Nintendo GameCube around 2004. The project was never announced to the public in any capacity, and only became known after a video game archivist acquired the prototype and published a video about it in November 2016.

As Timber was bypassed as the main character in Diddy Kong Racing, Rare's next game was planned to keep Timber as the main character, according to Kev Bayliss. This game was originally planned as Dinosaur Planet for the Nintendo 64, with Timber as a time traveller to a prehistoric period and gameplay similar to The Legend of Zelda: Ocarina of Time, but over time, they found it better to replace Timber with wholly new characters. This game became Star Fox Adventures for the GameCube at the suggestion of Nintendo.

=== Remake ===
Diddy Kong Racing DS is a Nintendo DS remake of Diddy Kong Racing. Developed by Rare and published by Nintendo, it was released in February 2007 in North America, and in April in Europe and Australia. This version received enhanced visuals and framerate in addition to touchscreen functions and Rumble Pak support for force feedback. Four new Donkey Kong themed racetracks were included in the remake, along with several modifications to the soundtrack. Banjo and Conker were replaced by Tiny Kong and Dixie Kong, while new playable characters Taj and Wizpig were also added. The DS version also features new modes which allow the player to create their own racetracks, customise their game through recording character voices and drawing player icons, and an online multiplayer function. The battle modes were restricted to multiplayer only, with the custom racetracks replacing them in Adventure Mode. The game was met with mixed reviews upon release, with critics asserting that the new additions were "gimmicky" and the touchscreen controls felt "horribly sensitive".

=== The "Diddy Laugh" ===
In the game's opening sequence, the sound of children laughing can be heard when the Rare logo is displayed. This stock sound effect is part of a library called The Premiere Edition Volume 1 released by sound producer and distributor The Hollywood Edge for use of stock sounds in media. Although it had been used previously in various films and television shows, this sound effect has come to be commonly referred to as "the Diddy laugh" due to its association with the game. According to Kevin Bayliss, the team got the idea to include a laughing sound effect in the opening after seeing Teletubbies, which had just begun airing at the time. They asked Tim Stamper's children, Joe Stamper Jr. and Kimberly Stamper, to laugh and sing in their new sound booth. The Stamper children's laughter was used alongside the original sound effect.
