= Banjo-Pilot =

2005 video game

- North American box art
- Developer: Rare
- Publisher: THQ
- Composers: Robin Beanland; Jamie Hughes
- Series: Banjo-Kazooie
- Platform: Game Boy Advance
- Release: NA: 10 January 2005; EU: 18 February 2005
- Genre: Kart racing
- Modes: Single-player, multiplayer

Banjo-Pilot is a 2005 kart racing video game for the Game Boy Advance (GBA) and the fourth installment in Rare's Banjo-Kazooie series. It plays similarly to the Mario Kart series by Nintendo: the player races one of nine playable characters around tracks, attacking other racers with bullets and collecting power-ups. The game features a number of single-player and multiplayer modes, such as time attack and item hunts. Unlike other kart racing games, characters control airplanes instead of go-karts.

Rare and Nintendo announced Banjo-Pilot at E3 2001 under the title Diddy Kong Pilot. At this point, it was the sequel to Rare's Diddy Kong Racing (1997), and featured characters from Nintendo's Donkey Kong and Mario series. However, company politics and Nintendo's concerns about quality delayed Diddy Kong Pilot past its planned release date in March 2002. After Microsoft acquired Rare in September 2002, it lost the rights to the Nintendo characters and replaced them with characters from its Banjo series.

THQ, which made a deal with Microsoft to publish Rare's GBA projects, released Banjo-Pilot in January 2005 to mixed reviews. Although critics praised its visuals, they felt it lacked originality and labelled it an inferior clone of Mario Kart.

== Gameplay ==
Gameplay screenshot showing the player character, Banjo the bear, racing in one of the playable tracks

Banjo-Pilot is a kart racing game featuring characters and environments from the Banjo-Kazooie series of platform games. It plays similarly to the Mario Kart series by Nintendo: the player, controlling a character in their vehicle, must race opponents around tracks. The player views the gameplay from behind the character's back, and must manoeuvre their character throughout the race. All races are three laps long and feature elements that confer advantages, such as offensive power-ups. Collectible, golden music notes, an element from the Banjo platformers, are scattered around tracks as well. Banjo-Pilot is distinguished from other kart racing games because the player controls airplanes instead of go-karts, allowing them to move up and down. However, the planes do exhibit behaviours normally associated with karts, such as slowing down over rough ground. The planes are equipped with bullets that can be shot at other players; they can also do a barrel roll to avoid attacks from others. The game features a total of nine player characters; Banjo, Kazooie, Mumbo Jumbo, and a purple Jinjo are initially available, while Humba Wumba, Gruntilda, Klungo, Bottles, and Jolly Roger can be unlocked through gameplay.

The game features 16 tracks accessible through four different game modes for a single-player. In Grand Prix, players race opponents through a series of four consecutive tracks and earn points based on their finishing position. At the end of Grand Prix, players must participate in a Champion Challenge—an aerial dogfight against a boss. Jiggy Challenge retains the emphasis on collecting items from the Banjo platformers: the player must look for and collect puzzle pieces called Jiggies for points while racing Bottles the mole. Quickrace allows the player to choose from any of the game's tracks to race on, while time trial challenges players to finish a course in the fastest time possible. The game also features multiplayer modes for up to four players: a multiplayer version of Grand Prix, a one-on-one race, and a dogfighting game. Competing in races will earn players "Cheato pages", loose book pages which serve as a form of currency. How many they earn is based on their race placement and how many musical notes they collect. These pages can be given to the anthropomorphic book Cheato in exchange for various bonuses, such as new game modes and characters.

== Development ==
Promotional artwork for Diddy Kong Pilot

Rare developed Banjo-Pilot for the Game Boy Advance (GBA) for nearly five years. At the beginning, Rare was a second-party developer for Nintendo and was known for creating games in Nintendo's long-running Donkey Kong franchise. As such, the game was originally titled Diddy Kong Pilot, a sequel to Rare's 1997 game Diddy Kong Racing, and would feature characters from Nintendo's Donkey Kong and Mario franchises. While it could be played using the GBA D-pad, Diddy Kong Pilot allowed players to control the characters by tilting the system, as the cartridge contained the same accelerometer technology used in Kirby Tilt 'n' Tumble (2000). Rare chose to focus on planes rather than cars because it wanted the game to stand out against other GBA racers. Nintendo and Rare announced the game at E3 in May 2001, and presented demos to attendees there and at Nintendo Space World in August. Journalists reacted positively to the demos, with particular praise for the visuals.

Nintendo aimed to release Diddy Kong Pilot on 4 March 2002, but became concerned with its quality around the time of Space World. One programmer recalled that Nintendo felt the tilt was not working well, that the GBA LCD only functioned as intended when aligned with a light source, and that a racing game with planes was pointless without a 3D world. Rare was expected to finish the game by October 2001 although it still had to implement numerous game modes; the programmer believed it should have been cancelled instead. Company politics also complicated development. According to the programmer, Rare was "micro-managing us into different directions, disregarding any hardware or cartridge space limitations". By September 2002, the game was still unreleased and Nintendo rival Microsoft acquired Rare. As Microsoft did not compete in the handheld market, the buyout did not affect Rare's plans to produce GBA games, but it lost access to Nintendo's Mario and Donkey Kong intellectual property (IP).

After developing the GBA port of Donkey Kong Country 2, Rare staff were told they needed to finish Diddy Kong Pilot, but would have to retool it using elements from the Banjo series. Banjo was one of the IPs Rare retained after the Microsoft buyout, so the project was retitled Banjo-Pilot. The IP change came to light in July 2003 when Microsoft trademarked the Banjo-Pilot title. Rare's Paul Rahme said the retooling took five months. The game underwent "radical changes" during the transition; the graphics and presentation were altered, and different racetracks were added. Rare also removed the tilt controls as they were unable to improve them. The soundtrack, composed by Robin Beanland and Jamie Hughes, was unaltered as Rare was unable to implement new music. Staff who developed the Nintendo 64 (N64) Banjo games had little involvement, but the lead designer supervised to make sure the content was in line with the N64 games. Both the Diddy Kong Pilot prototypes and the final game use a Mode 7-style game engine, but at one point Rare switched to one that rendered environments using voxels. Rare quickly discarded the voxel engine due to frame rate problems that arose when characters and weapons were added.

On 11 August 2003, Microsoft announced it would collaborate with THQ to publish Rare's GBA projects, including Banjo-Pilot, Banjo-Kazooie: Grunty's Revenge (2003), Sabre Wulf (2004), and It's Mr. Pants (2005). THQ released Banjo-Pilot in North America on 11 January 2005 and in Europe on 18 February. On 5 November 2011, a Diddy Kong Pilot prototype leaked online.

== Reception ==
Reception

Aggregate score
Aggregator	Score
Metacritic	68/100 (22 reviews)

Review scores
Publication	Score
Eurogamer	6/10
GameSpot	7.2/10
GameSpy	3/5
GameZone	8.2/10
IGN	8/10
Nintendo World Report	7.5/10
VideoGamer.com	4/10
Cubed3	9/10

According to Metacritic, a video game review aggregator, Banjo-Pilot received "mixed or average reviews". Many reviewers thought the game lacked originality and believed placing the characters in planes was not enough to set it apart from other kart racing games on the GBA. GameSpy and Nintendo World Report (NWR) noted the planes still had behaviours traditionally associated with go-karts, such as slowing down when not on the track. NWR also argued the manoeuvres the planes could do were worthless and did not add anything to the experience. Eurogamer thought the planes made the game feel more 3D but reduced it to favouring luck over skill. Additionally, NWR believed Banjo-Pilot lacked what made Rare's prior racing games R.C. Pro-Am (1988) and Diddy Kong Racing great, while VideoGamer.com wrote that removing Nintendo characters and the tilt controls prevented the game from bringing innovation to the kart racing genre.

The game was often labelled a clone of Nintendo's Mario Kart games. While critics generally felt Banjo-Pilot was one of the better Mario Kart clones—Cubed3 and IGN both called it the second-best GBA racer after Mario Kart: Super Circuit (2001)—they wrote that players would be better off playing a game from that series. Eurogamer thought players should try Banjo-Pilot before deciding to buy it, and GameSpy and VideoGamer.com said there was no reason to have it when better games like Mario Kart and Konami Krazy Racers (2001) were already available on the GBA. IGN, on the other hand, argued that the similarities to Mario Kart were not necessarily a bad thing as it allowed for balanced game design, and GameSpot called the game entertaining and favorably compared it to the original Super Mario Kart (1992). Eurogamer and VideoGamer.com also questioned how appealing the game would be to players, noting characters such as Banjo were relatively obscure and would likely only be recognised by those who played the N64 Banjo games.

Reviewers said that Banjo-Pilot, as a Mario Kart clone, was fine gameplay-wise, but disagreed over whether this was enough to make it a successful game. While IGN argued Banjo-Pilot improved upon the kart racing formula because of its new features and believed its planes controlled better than go-karts, VideoGamer.com said the game modes were unfulfilling. Reviewers from Cubed3, GameZone, IGN, and NWR praised the controls as intuitive and simple, although IGN believed they "scream[ed]" for compatibility with an analogue stick. However, GameSpy called the controls overly sensitive and noted they were set to those of a standard airplane, which they called counter-intuitive. Eurogamer characterised the controls as hard to get used to. Reviewers singled out the multiplayer mode as a highlight, with GameSpot and GameZone respectively calling it the game's strongest feature and the GBA's best since The Legend of Zelda: Four Swords (2002), although Eurogamer wrote it was challenging to find others who owned the game. Boss fights received criticism for their inconsistent difficulties and some felt they distracted from the overall experience, although Cubed3 and GameSpy praised Rare's effort to innovate. The difficulty of opponent AI enraged VideoGamer.com.

Critics were more generous towards the presentation; many praised the amount of detail in the visuals and animations. Cubed3 and GameSpot respectively compared them to that of a low-end N64 game and a Mode 7 Super NES game, Eurogamer felt they were impressive and used the GBA's otherwise subpar 3D capabilities to the fullest and GameZone called them eye-catching. The steady frame rate was also praised. One of the only problems IGN noticed was pop-up that occurred when weapons were picked up. Visual perception was an area many reviewers faulted, as they noted sometimes other racers would block their line of sight. VideoGamer.com and GameZone both praised the audio, which they called one of the bearable aspects of the game and humorous. IGN felt the music was well-composed and fit the Banjo theme, although they did note similarities the tracks bore to those from other games and films like Aladdin.
