= Donkey Kong Bananza =

2025 video game

- Developer: Nintendo EPD (Note: Additional development support by 1-Up Studio and tri-Crescendo)
- Publisher: Nintendo
- Directors: Wataru Tanaka; Kazuya Takahashi
- Producer: Kenta Motokura
- Designer: Kazuya Takahashi
- Programmers: Wataru Tanaka; Tatsuya Kurihara
- Artist: Daisuke Watanabe
- Composer: Naoto Kubo
- Series: Donkey Kong
- Platform: Nintendo Switch 2
- Release: July 17, 2025
- Genres: Platform, action-adventure
- Modes: Single-player, multiplayer

Donkey Kong Bananza (Note: Japanese: ドンキーコングバナンザ, Hepburn: Donkī Kongu Bananza) is a 2025 platform game developed by Nintendo EPD for the Nintendo Switch 2. The player controls the gorilla Donkey Kong, who ventures to the planetary core with the teenage Pauline. Similar to EPD's Super Mario Odyssey (2017), the player explores sandbox-like levels while completing objectives, battling enemies, and collecting objects. Bananza is distinguished by its destructible environments; the player can destroy most terrain to create paths and find items. They upgrade Donkey Kong's abilities by collecting banana-shaped diamonds and obtaining power-up transformations.

EPD began working on Donkey Kong Bananza following Super Mario Odyssey's completion, following a request from the manager Yoshiaki Koizumi. It was the first internally-developed Donkey Kong game since Donkey Kong Jungle Beat (2004), and Koizumi and Donkey Kong's creator Shigeru Miyamoto provided input. EPD wanted to honor Donkey Kong's past while establishing a new direction. They made greater use of the voxel technology that allowed players to manipulate terrain in some Odyssey levels, with large, destructible worlds emphasizing Donkey Kong's strength. The development began on the original Nintendo Switch, but shifted to the Switch 2 due to technical constraints.

Nintendo released Donkey Kong Bananza on July 17, 2025, following a marketing campaign that included Nintendo Direct presentations, demo exhibitions, and live service game events. It was the first original Donkey Kong game since Donkey Kong Country: Tropical Freeze (2014) and the first 3D platformer since Donkey Kong 64 (1999). Bananza received acclaim; critics considered it the Switch 2's killer app and praised its visuals, gameplay, level design, and story, but criticized the camera and frame rate. It has sold 5.05 million copies, making it the third-bestselling Switch 2 game. It was one of the highest-rated games of 2025 and was nominated for numerous accolades, including Game of the Year.

== Gameplay ==
Donkey Kong swings a stone slab and destroys terrain. Bananza features destructible environments; almost every surface can be destroyed.

Donkey Kong Bananza is a 3D platformer and adventure game that emphasizes destruction and open-world exploration. Journalists have compared it to Super Mario Odyssey (2017), with some describing it as a successor. (Note: Sources describing Bananza as an Odyssey successor: IGN, Nintendo World Report, Rolling Stone, and Eurogamer) As the gorilla Donkey Kong, the player collects the Banandium Gems, golden banana-shaped diamonds, while exploring sandbox-like levels in an underground world. Each underground layer has a unique theme, including ice, lava, and tropical biomes.

Donkey Kong can roll, punch, slap the terrain, pick up and throw objects, and climb most surfaces. The player learns five animal-themed power-up transformations from non-player character (NPC) elders: a gorilla transformation that increases Donkey Kong's strength; a zebra transformation that increases his speed; an ostrich transformation that allows him to glide and drop egg bombs; an elephant transformation that allows him to inhale and spit terrain; and a snake transformation that increases his jump height. The player can use and swap between transformations at any time, though their duration is limited by an energy meter.

The player completes missions, solves puzzles, and fights enemies to collect Banandium Gems, which are also found by exploring or progressing through the story. Banandium Gems are used to upgrade Donkey Kong's abilities from a skill tree. There are reportedly up to 1,000 Banandium Gems obtainable, 777 of which are tracked as unique collectibles. Collecting them is optional, and it is possible to complete the game without obtaining any. While exploring, the player discovers secluded areas where they must complete challenges including platforming, solving puzzles, defeating enemies within a time limit, and mining for gold. They are rewarded Banandium Gems or gold upon completion. Some areas contain side-scrolling sections, referencing the Donkey Kong Country games, and minecarts.

The player can receive advice from, assist, and obtain Banandium Gems from NPCs, including Donkey Kong characters such as Cranky Kong, Diddy Kong, Dixie Kong, and Rambi. When Bananza starts, Donkey Kong befriends Odd Rock, an anthropomorphic purple stone who directs him towards objectives. As the game progresses, Odd Rock is revealed to be a young Pauline, who can use her singing voice to activate Donkey Kong's transformations, remove seals, and, if a second player controls her in a co-op mode, emit explosive projectiles. Bananza supports GameShare, allowing a second player to control Pauline locally or online on another Nintendo Switch 2, or locally on an original Nintendo Switch.

Bananza is distinguished by its destructible environments: Donkey Kong can smash almost every surface and destroy terrain. He can rip pieces of the environment from the ground or walls and throw them to uncover items or destroy enemies, or use them as snowboards. Soft terrain can be stacked to create new paths. Destroying environments allows for varied traversal; for instance, Donkey Kong can dig underground and create a path to another area of the world. He can also uncover Banandium Gems by digging. The extent to which the player can destroy the environment is limited by a layer of unbreakable bedrock at the bottom of each level. Large bosses block the routes that link each layer, and the player must defeat each to progress. Progress is tracked in a 3D world map, and giant eels allow players to fast travel to different layers or across the current layer.

Other collectibles include gold, which serves as currency and fuel for transformations; balloons, which rescue Donkey Kong from bottomless pits; Banandium Chips, coins that the player can trade for Banandium Gems; fossils, which the player can trade for clothing to customize Donkey Kong and Pauline; and tracks for an in-game music player. Bananza features Amiibo support; scanning a Bananza-themed Donkey Kong and Pauline figure unlocks a special costume for Pauline, and existing Donkey Kong Amiibo (Donkey Kong, Diddy Kong, King K. Rool, and Super Nintendo World bands) summon explosive gold tiles. Other Amiibo summon spheres with special properties that assist traversal. A photo mode allows the player to use a free-moving camera to take and customize screenshots, and an art creation mode, DK Artist, allows them to carve and paint sculptures using the Joy-Con 2's mouse functionality.

== Plot ==
Donkey Kong travels to Ingot Isle to search for Banandium Gems amidst a gold rush. A mining corporation, VoidCo., steals the gems to power its ship. VoidCo.'s president, Void Kong, seeks to travel to the planetary core to find the Banandium Root, a magical object that grants the wishes of its wielder, and obtain riches. Donkey Kong is swept underground, where he rescues Odd Rock. They discover a vast Hollow Earth-like region inhabited by animal societies and their ancient elders. A Kong elder grants Donkey Kong transformative powers and restores Odd Rock to its true self, the teenage girl Pauline. She explains that Void kidnapped her, believing her singing voice could awaken the root.

The elder advises Donkey Kong and Pauline to continue to the core to find the root. Donkey Kong and Pauline discover more underground layers, battle VoidCo.'s minions, and meet other animal tribe elders, who grant Donkey Kong new transformations. Pauline dreams of becoming a famous singer and gains more confidence to sing as she and Donkey Kong progress. Void's subordinates grow disillusioned with VoidCo. and quit, choosing to help Donkey Kong instead. Donkey Kong and Pauline battle Void at the core, where Pauline awakens an object that Void thinks is the root. She instead frees King K. Rool, who became trapped with his Kremling Krew while searching for the root.

K. Rool dispatches Void and resumes his search; he wishes to turn the world into rotten banana mush to eat. Donkey Kong and Pauline defeat him in a battle at the core and claim the root. Donkey Kong wishes for a large supply of bananas, while Pauline wishes to return home. The root brings them to New Donk City, Pauline's hometown, on a tower of bananas. K. Rool pursues them, claims the root, and floods the city with toxic mush. Donkey Kong and Pauline defeat him again, restoring New Donk City, and reluctantly part ways. Donkey Kong dives underground to continue adventuring while Pauline begins street performing. Three months later, Donkey Kong and Pauline reunite. She asks for his help to prepare for a show at New Donk City Hall, believing that the elders can help her write a new song. After completing a challenge in the core, Pauline comes up with the melody, and they return to the surface for her performance.

== Development ==
=== Conception ===
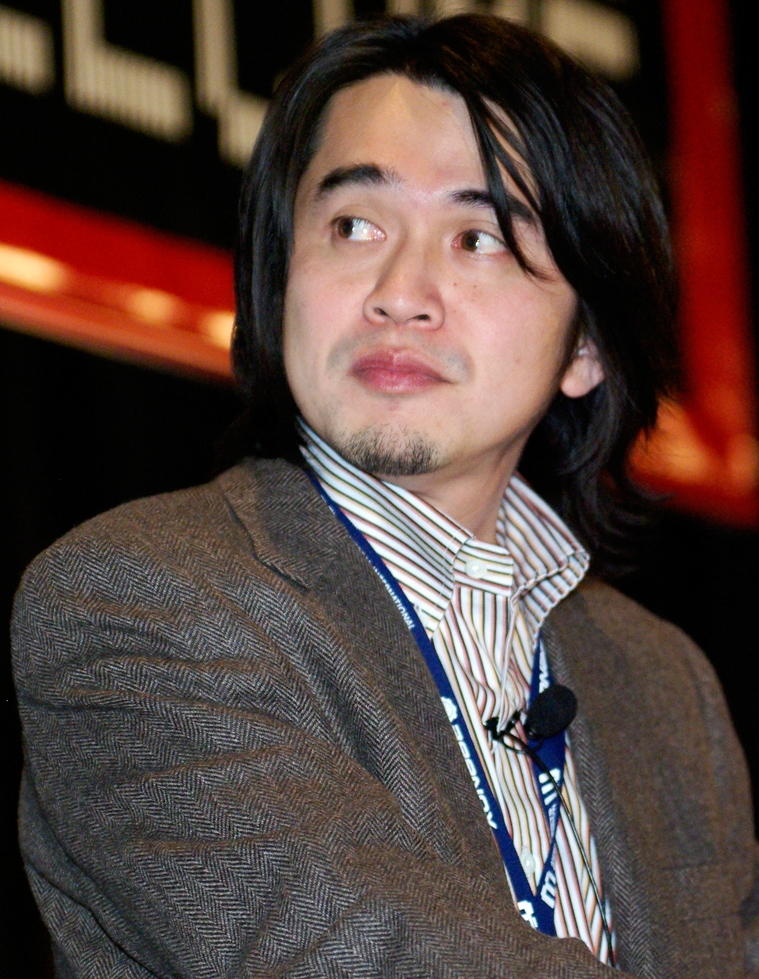
The Bananza idea came from Yoshiaki Koizumi (pictured in 2007), who directed Donkey Kong Jungle Beat (2004).

After Nintendo Entertainment Planning & Development (EPD) Production Group No. 8 completed Super Mario Odyssey, EPD's senior general manager Yoshiaki Koizumi—who directed Donkey Kong Jungle Beat (2004)—asked the team to develop a 3D Donkey Kong game. The last original Donkey Kong game was Donkey Kong Country: Tropical Freeze (2014), and Koizumi wanted to expand the franchise. Furthermore, Nintendo had not developed a Donkey Kong game internally since Jungle Beat, and wanted to establish separate 2D and 3D Donkey Kong series as they had with the Super Mario series. The Odyssey director Kenta Motokura, who worked as a character artist on Jungle Beat, was assigned as producer.

Motokura said EPD wanted to innovate as Donkey Kong (1981) had with story-driven gameplay and varied stage design and Donkey Kong Country (1994) had with pre-rendered graphics, using the skills they gathered from developing Super Mario games. The team consulted Koizumi and Donkey Kong's creator, Shigeru Miyamoto, to better understand Donkey Kong; they emphasized Donkey Kong's strength. Koizumi highlighted his large arms as distinguishing him from Mario, while Miyamoto highlighted his wild, goofy nature and varied abilities, such as slapping terrain.

Kazuya Takahashi, who joined Nintendo in 2020 after previously working on open-world role-playing video games, and Wataru Tanaka, Odyssey's programmer, were assigned as Bananza's directors. Nintendo Life reported that development began in 2017 or 2018, while GamesRadar+ speculated that full-scale production likely did not start until after Takahashi joined Nintendo and EPD finished Bowser's Fury (2021). EPD began work remotely due to the COVID-19 pandemic. Much of the staff were lifelong Donkey Kong fans; Tanaka said he was "obsessed" with Donkey Kong Country (1994) as a child, while other staff played the Rare Donkey Kong games and the art director, Daisuke Watanabe, grew up playing the 1981 game on the Famicom.

=== Technology ===
Bananza prototype showcasing a Goomba with hands destroying terrain

After Odyssey's release, a software engineer, Tatsuya Kurihara, began conducting experiments with voxel technology. It had been used to a limited degree in Odyssey to allow Mario to dig through cheese and plow snow, and Motokura thought it had the potential to be pushed further. In one experiment, Kurihara added large hands to a Goomba so it could rip and throw terrain. Tanaka said the team found this "surprisingly satisfying" and interesting as a central gameplay element, and Motokura suggested that Donkey Kong's physical strength was a good fit for the technology. He was inspired by the second level of Super Mario Bros. (1985), which allows the player to create paths by destroying blocks.

Bananza's development began on the original Switch, but shifted to the Switch 2 around 2021. The limited memory of the original Switch struggled to handle the detailed environments, and Tanaka was unsure if it was possible to develop the game as envisioned. The Switch 2 allowed Bananza to run at a stable 60 frames per second, expand the environmental size and details, and incorporate concepts that had been discarded due to technical constraints. Takahashi said the team was also enticed by the Joy-Con 2's mouse controls.

The entirety of Bananza's terrain is made from voxels, which Motokura said was its main difference from Odyssey. The average Bananza level contains over 347 million voxels. Takahashi described building levels from voxels as more convenient than polygonal modeling, as developers could quickly iterate by combining voxels and materials and testing in-game. EPD sought to ensure players would not notice the voxels, finding it more fun if objects did not look destructible. They limited using polygons to ensure the frame rate remained smooth. Moving to the Switch 2 enabled the expansion of the level of environmental destruction; Watanabe said: "[the Switch 2] unlocked the game's full potential—no, it made the game possible." EPD developed a new virtual camera system so players would be able to see while digging underground. 1-Up Studio and tri-Crescendo provided programming assistance.

=== Game design ===
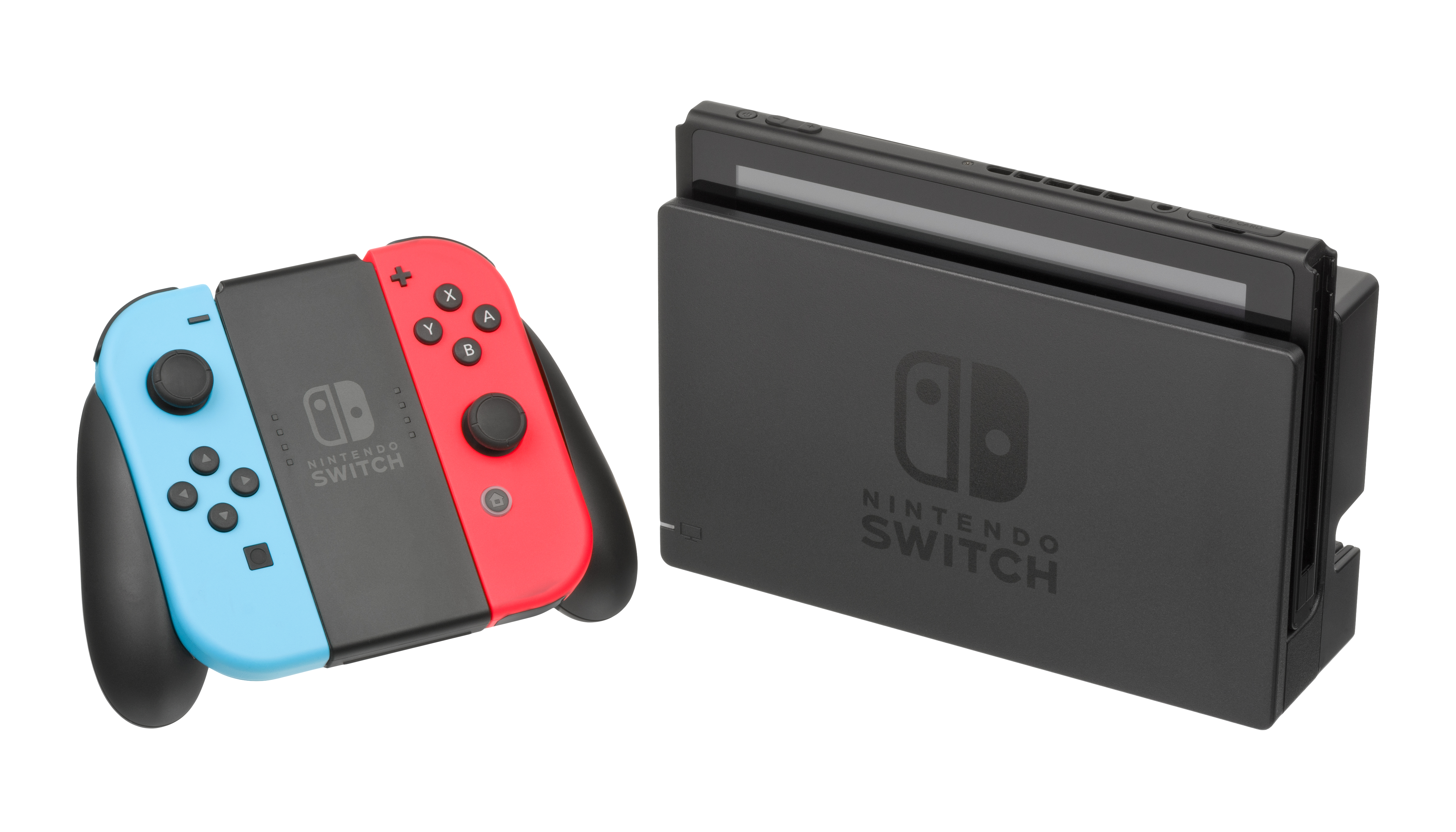
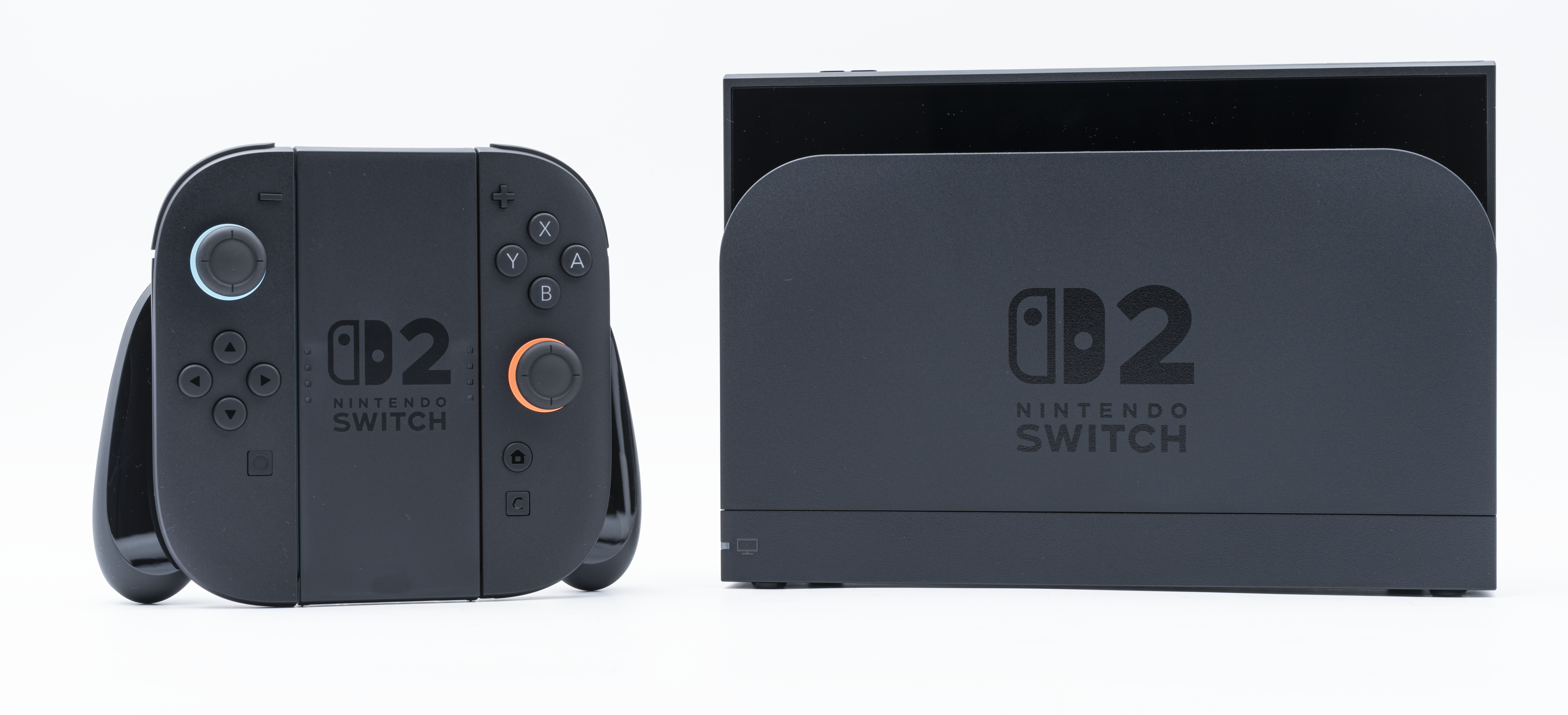
Bananza entered development on the original Nintendo Switch (top) before shifting to the Switch 2.

EPD developed Bananza using Odyssey as a basis. As it was the first 3D Donkey Kong platformer since Donkey Kong 64 (1999), Watanabe wanted it to feel new in terms of gameplay and art direction. Nonetheless, EPD sought to honor Donkey Kong's history and revive elements they felt would mesh with the destructible environments. Takahashi replayed every Donkey Kong game and cited Donkey Kong Country as a particular influence. EPD used the voxel technology to present returning elements, including minecarts, barrel cannons, and Animal Friends such as Rambi, in new ways; Motokura added that they did not want to rely solely on nostalgia. They wanted to satisfy veteran Donkey Kong fans while appealing to players who were alienated by the franchise's high difficulty level, so they included the skill tree, an easier game mode, and co-op features as options. Side-scrolling areas were included to bridge the gap between the 2D and 3D Donkey Kong games.

In designing each layer, EPD generally chose a theme and then thought about what voxel-based game mechanics could be included. In one instance, the ability to surf on pieces of terrain inspired a layer with rolling hills. They designed the underground world as a hierarchical society, the structures of each world based on either the animal inhabitants or bananas. The team wanted the underground world to feel strange and distinct from the surface setting of previous Donkey Kong games, with a wide variety of colors, but sought to evoke the franchise's original Brooklyn-inspired aesthetic and incorporated the neon pink and blue colors from the 1981 game as highlights. They also included an indicator for how many meters underground the player is as a reference to the 1981 game, which uses height to distinguish levels. The team connected layers through sinkholes to enhance the feeling of going deeper underground and, unlike Odyssey, so players could travel to new locations via gameplay.

Levels were designed to exploit Donkey Kong's strength, and unlike the 3D Super Mario games, guide the player downward rather than upward. EPD built them around landmarks such as basins, craters, and buildings that run through the ground, to encourage players to continuously destroy terrain. They prioritized a primary route before designing alternate paths. Takahashi said that the discoveries players make from destruction and the addition of a skill tree made for a gameplay loop different from Odyssey's. The team prioritized freedom and did not restrict players to a single route, allowing for sequence breaking and ensuring it was easy to return to the primary route after a detour. The destruction mechanics encouraged the team to depart from Super Mario's pattern-based boss battles and allow players to deal damage at any time. For collision detection, they placed rough shapes underneath characters and objects to ensure hits would connect. While this occasionally results in objects clipping through walls, the team determined that the player's enjoyment would offset the break in immersion.

Designing Donkey Kong's punch was one of the most difficult elements, as EPD wanted to avoid it becoming monotonous. This required minute refinements to various systems, including the sound design, controller rumble, and camera effects. They used effects such as slow motion and freeze frames to add emphasis. Motokura conceived the power-up transformations, which he thought would make the destruction more fun. EPD discussed elemental transformations, such as fire; the animal transformations originated from concept art depicting Donkey Kong as a muscular zebra. The gorilla transformation came from the concept of Donkey Kong as a "dark hero", while the ostrich transformation was added to pay homage to Donkey Kong Country, which features a flying ostrich character. Other transformations were created based on their functionality. Each design was based on the image of a more muscular, powerful Donkey Kong and incorporated bananas to reflect Bananza's theming. EPD wanted the transformations to add replay value by allowing players to revisit levels in different ways, though they designed Bananza so that it could be completed without unlocking any.

Koizumi and Miyamoto played Bananza throughout its development and provided input. Bananza originally used the same button layout as the Super Mario games, with the controller's lowest face button used to jump, but Miyamoto suggested that digging would be more suitable. Takahashi found this more intuitive, so he used Miyamoto's suggestion as the default layout while including the Super Mario layout as an option. EPD implemented mouse controls in the optional co-op and DK Artist modes. The co-op mode was designed so that a player could allow their child or friend to contribute, and the team sought to differentiate the second player's abilities to account for the lack of balance. They gave the second player more agency than they had in the co-op modes of Super Mario Galaxy (2007) and Odyssey. DK Artist was designed as tech demo similar to a 3D modelling application, and originated from a debugging tool used to sculpt environments. The team compared it to Super Mario 64's (1996) interactive Mario face, which served a similar purpose.

=== Character design ===
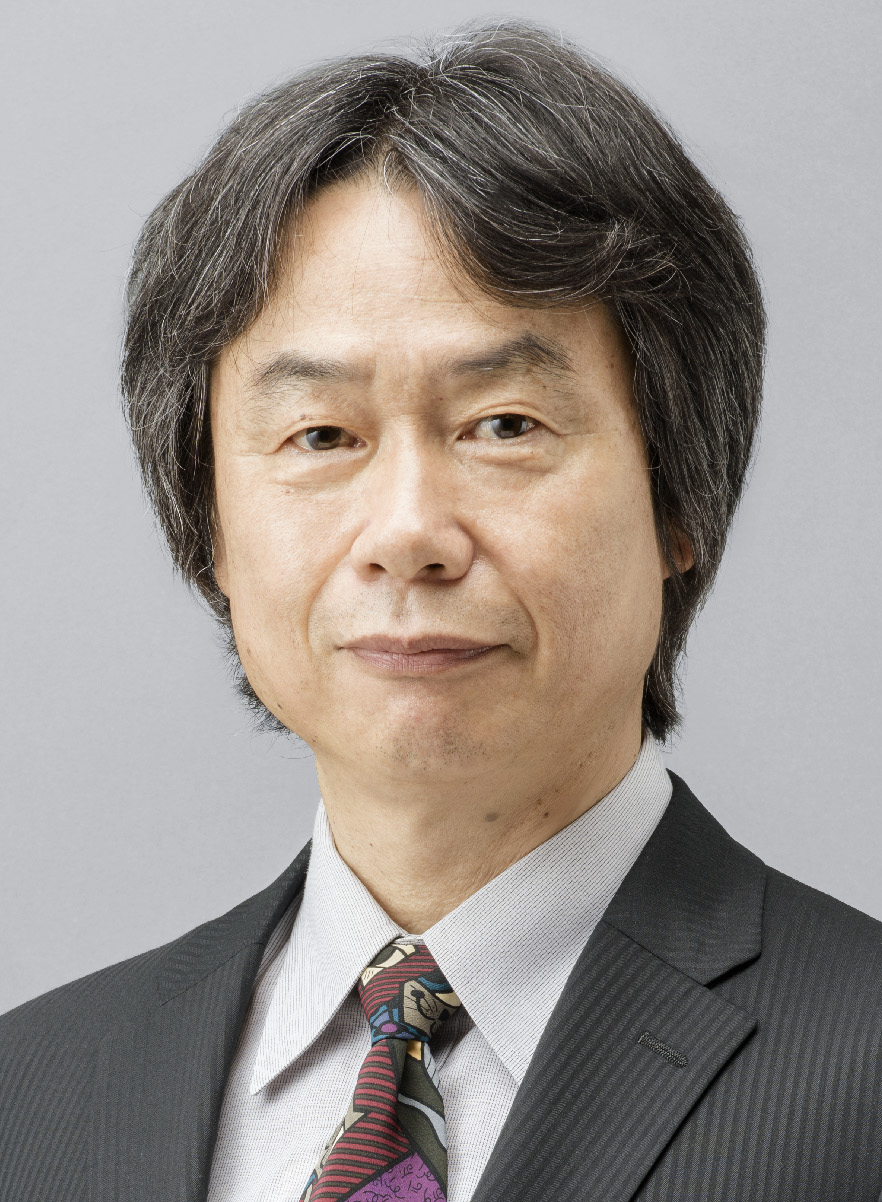
Donkey Kong's creator Shigeru Miyamoto (pictured in 2015) was a consultant, and the developers sought to honor his vision when redesigning Donkey Kong.

The redesigned Donkey Kong combines the expressiveness of Miyamoto's original design and Rare's more cool and adventurous Country depiction. The design was created for Bananza, but first appeared in The Super Mario Bros. Movie (2023) and Mario Kart World (2025). Watanabe said the team strove to encapsulate what made Donkey Kong appealing and unique. They wanted a depiction that remained true to Miyamoto's vision and accounted for how different generations of Donkey Kong fans saw the character, and consulted previous Donkey Kong artists for advice. Because Donkey Kong's character model is much larger than Mario's, they emphasized his facial expressions, which Motokura felt highlighted his uniqueness. They gave him overalls and thick fur to make him look interesting from a third-person perspective. Other returning characters received design adjustments to fit Bananza's style, such as Cranky holding a shovel instead of a cane.

Bananza introduces the Fractones, a race of mineral NPCs with sparkling eyes. Takahashi described them as symbolizing the destruction concept. Motokura wanted to use voxels for elements besides terrain, and Takahashi thought it would be fun to have NPCs the player could interact with in varied ways, such as destroying them or using them for materials. Using voxels allowed the team to create many variations, so Fractones appear in many shapes based on their roles and surroundings. Fractones, as well as other underground NPCs, were characterized as enjoying destruction and violence to add humor, distinguish the underground world from the human one (where common sense prevails), and encourage players to engage with the destruction mechanics.

=== Story ===
Bananza's story came from the concept of levels guiding the player downward, as Takahashi decided that aiming underground would be the characters' motivation. Bananza's characters seek to reach the Banandium Root, which EPD conceived as the source of the world's energy. They used banana as a root for objects which draw energy from the Banandium Root. This extended to the title, a pun on the words banana and bonanza. As EPD discussed the opening sequence, which depicts a gold rush, they felt bonanza was an appropriate descriptor and realized it could easily be combined with banana. Tanaka thought the title perfectly described a game about digging up bananas.

Motokura decided that a mining company would be a suitable antagonist, leading to the creation of Void Kong and his subordinates. EPD provided background information on loading screens to flesh out the characters and world. EPD focused on VoidCo. before determining whether characters from previous Donkey Kong games should appear. In a plot twist, King K. Rool, the antagonist of the Rare Donkey Kong games, replaces Void Kong as the antagonist; it was his first appearance in a Donkey Kong game since DK: Jungle Climber (2007) and provided an in-universe explanation for his absence. Character inclusions sparked debate, though Motokura mandated that Cranky Kong, a character he enjoys, be included.

Early in development, EPD decided that another character would accompany Donkey Kong. Though one developer suggested Pauline, no character was specified in the software design description. Motokura recalled that the team revisited the idea when implementing Donkey Kong's zebra transformation. Naoto Kubo composed music for the transformation sequence, which the team decided to turn into a song that Pauline— established as a singer in Super Mario Odyssey—could perform. EPD used Pauline as a human guide who could explain concepts to the player, and Motokura and Takahashi credited her inclusion with helping many of their ideas take form.

In contrast to her previous appearances as an adult, Pauline is depicted as a 13-year-old girl. Takahashi felt Pauline riding on Donkey Kong's back would look more natural if she was a girl, and that it allowed for the inclusion of a character who existing fans knew while intriguing new players. He said that 13 is the age when children begin to worry about their futures, so Pauline being a girl also provided a direction for the story; Motokura said she was a character to which players could relate. The in-universe reason for the age discrepancy is not explained, as EPD wanted to leave it to fans' imagination. Following Bananza's release, debates ensued over whether it was a prequel or sequel to Odyssey.

=== Sound ===
Kubo, Odyssey's lead composer, was Bananza's sound director. EPD emphasized music due to Pauline's inclusion, using her singing to signify routes or destroy barriers. Pauline is the only character who speaks in a real language, as other characters with voice roles speak in fictional languages; Kubo thought this would increase immersion. Kubo cast the American actress Jenny Kidd as Pauline's singing voice and cast other actors whose voices he felt were in line with hers. Bananza was the first Donkey Kong game in 21 years in which Takashi Nagasako did not voice Donkey Kong. He was replaced by Koji Takeda, who voiced Donkey Kong in the Japanese dub of The Super Mario Bros. Movie.

EPD used Foley techniques to record sound effects and aimed to make destruction sound varied and satisfying. The sounds for mining gold came from metal that Kubo purchased at a hardware store, while those for food-related objects came from recordings of staff chewing on foods such as apples, candy, celery and cookies. Kubo had to wait a year for the harvest season so he could record the sounds for watermelons that Donkey Kong can break. For a level in which Donkey Kong can punch hamburger meat, the team used a modified watermelon sound, as it was difficult to record a good clip from a hamburger.

The team added randomness and tuned the sounds to ensure they were not too loud or high-pitched, and "emphasized fun and flashy sounds" for unusual objects that appear during later levels. They synchronized some sound effects with the background music. While playing an early build, Miyamoto told Kubo that he thought Donkey Kong felt too light, and suggested making his footsteps louder to compensate. Kubo said addressing this concern was challenging, as he did not want to weaken the impact of destruction sounds. He had Miyamoto listen to his adjustments and felt he struck a balance between making Donkey Kong feel heavier and maintaining the impact of destruction.

=== Music ===
The Bananza soundtrack features 229 tracks, with a runtime of eight hours and 36 minutes. The composers included Kubo, Daisuke Matsuoka, Reika Nakai, Yuri Goto, and Tsukasa Usui. Kubo said they aimed for a soundtrack with "a wide range of expression", and used music to immerse the player and establish each layer's atmosphere. The composers sought to suit both fast-paced destruction and methodical exploration, as they felt it would become tiring if all the music was high energy. They split level themes into parts and adjusted them to reflect the player's surroundings. Kubo decided to tie music to the animal transformations, similar to how the music changes in Super Mario games when Mario obtains certain power-ups.

Bananza features several songs performed by Kidd. Some songs are slower, while others are more energetic or performed in a rap-like fashion. At Motokura's request, Kubo wrote songs for each transformation. They feature fictional languages, as Kubo wanted to emphasize the action rather than the lyrics. He drew inspiration from different genres to evoke the feeling of each animal. The gorilla transformation theme mixes African, rock, and electronic dance music, while the zebra draws from Latin music and the ostrich mixes rock and pop. Takeda provided background vocals for each. The main theme, "Breaking Through (Heart of Gold)", is a ballad summarizing Bananza. Kubo wrote it as if it was a retrospective of Donkey Kong and Pauline's adventures and incorporated the melody of the original Donkey Kong theme to tie the franchise's past and future together.

Kubo wanted to retain the variety of previous Donkey Kong soundtracks, balancing upbeat and somber, atmospheric music. Though the Rare composers David Wise, Eveline Novakovic, and Grant Kirkhope were not involved, Bananza features compositions from their soundtracks, including Donkey Kong Country, Donkey Kong Country 2 (1995) and Donkey Kong 64. Kirkhope was amused that Bananza includes a remix of Donkey Kong 64's "DK Rap", which he called "the worst rap track in the history of rap tracks". Kubo said the composers prioritized original material and briefly ignored that Bananza was a Donkey Kong game to write new music, using rearrangements sparingly. Some new themes incorporate motifs from the Donkey Kong Country soundtrack, such as the final level's heavy metal music including the refrain of Wise's "Aquatic Ambience".

== Release ==
Nintendo released Donkey Kong Bananza on July 17, 2025, although copies had circulated by July 14. It was the first original Donkey Kong game since Tropical Freeze. Radio Times wrote that Bananza was released amidst a broader effort by Nintendo to reestablish Donkey Kong as a major franchise, alongside Donkey Kong's role in The Super Mario Bros. Movie, a themed area at Super Nintendo World, and a reported film adaptation with Universal Pictures.

=== Marketing ===
Nintendo announced Bananza via a trailer as the finale of a Switch 2-focused Nintendo Direct presentation on April 2, 2025, before allowing journalists in New York City to play a 20-minute demo. Journalists were surprised by the announcement; Game Informer wrote that many expected a 3D Super Mario announcement instead. It became highly anticipated as the Switch 2's second major exclusive, following Mario Kart World.

Bananza's marketing campaign included Nintendo Treehouse streams, the Nintendo Today! app, a dedicated Nintendo Direct presentation, live-action television advertisements, and events in live service games such as Super Mario Run (2016) and Tetris 99 (2019). Bananza was playable at the Nintendo Switch 2 Experience events, held worldwide between April and June. Nintendo distributed playable ten-minute demos for Switch 2 kiosks in Walmart and Target stores in the US in June, and hosted demo events for shoppers at EB Games and Costco stores in Canada between July 18 and 20. In Japan, Nintendo accompanied the release with merchandise including keychains and plushes. Nintendo released an Amiibo figure of Donkey Kong and Pauline to coincide with Bananza; it also restocked Diddy Kong and K. Rool figures, which had been out of print for several years.

Nintendo excluded K. Rool from marketing materials, leading to speculation and debate among fans as to whether he would appear. A popular theory suggested that Void Kong was K. Rool in disguise. GamesRadar+ said K. Rool appearing seemed natural given his long absence from Donkey Kong games and the positive response to his appearance in Super Smash Bros. Ultimate (2018). Nintendo began featuring K. Rool in marketing materials in December 2025.

=== Sales ===
Bananza was the bestselling game on Amazon by June 23, 2025. It debuted at the top of the UK physical sales charts, selling three times as many copies as the Switch version of Tropical Freeze. Sales were about half of Odyssey's launch sales; an analyst attributed this to Nintendo releasing Bananza closer to the console launch than Odyssey and during a slower sales period. In Japan, it debuted in second place, selling 127,905 copies during its first three days and 207,055 copies by August 3. In the US, it was the bestselling game on Nintendo platforms in July, and the third-bestselling game overall. As of September 30, 2026, Donkey Kong Bananza has sold 5.05 million copies, making it the third-bestselling Nintendo Switch 2 game.

== Reception ==
Reception

Aggregate scores
Aggregator	Score
Metacritic	91/100 (Note: Based on 143 reviews)
OpenCritic	98% recommend (Note: Based on 176 reviews)

Review scores
Publication	Score
4Players	8.5/10
Destructoid	9/10
Edge	9/10
Eurogamer	4/5
Famitsu	10/10, 9/10, 9/10, 10/10 (Note: Each of the four reviewers in Famitsu scored the game on a ten-point scale.)
Game Informer	9/10
Gamekult	8/10
GameSpot	9/10
GamesRadar+	4.5/5
IGN	10/10
Jeuxvideo.com	17/20
Nintendo Life	9/10
Nintendo World Report	8.5/10
NME	4/5
The Guardian	4/5
The Washington Post	4/4

Donkey Kong Bananza received "universal acclaim" according to the review aggregator website Metacritic. OpenCritic reported that 98% of critics recommended the game. Reviewers described it as the Switch 2's killer app.

Logan Plant of IGN called Bananza "Nintendo's first Switch 2 masterpiece" and one of the best platform games, and The Washington Post said it was one of the best Nintendo games of recent years, likening it to Super Mario Odyssey.

Critics praised the game's visuals and gameplay. IGN praised DK's movement and abilities, as well as the destructible environments and platforming challenges, calling it "a smashing return for a classic Nintendo character". Adam Newell in his review for Destructoid praised the surprises, gameplay, and story. Jim Norman in his review for Nintendo Life praised the variety, sense of adventure, and challenges.

Critics enjoyed the destruction. They criticized the camera and frame rate. 4Players and NME criticized the co-op mode, which NME said felt "like an afterthought". Jeuxvideo.com said that the bosses are too easy and are "recycled", that the music is not impactful enough, and that the game has few "wow" sequences.

Billie Bugara of Pitchfork gave the soundtrack 7.0 out of 10. He praised it as central to Bananza's identity, blending inventive "genre-hopping" compositions with dynamic level themes that build on Donkey Kong's musical legacy. He criticized the remixes of Wise's Donkey Kong Country tracks as part of "Nintendo's seemingly terminal plague of injecting hollow nostalgia into its games", but saw the soundtrack as an "electrifying" and forward-looking continuation of Donkey Kong music.

=== Accolades ===
Donkey Kong Bananza was the seventh-highest-rated game of 2025 on Metacritic, and the fifth on OpenCritic. Many publications named Bananza one of the best games of 2025, including Ars Technica, The A.V. Club, Den of Geek, The Economist, Edge, Eurogamer, IGN, GamesRadar+, GQ, NPR, Rolling Stone, Der Spiegel, and Slant Magazine.

A poll of 191 Japanese game developers and industry figures ranked Bananza the fourth-most popular game of 2025. A similar poll conducted by 4Gamer.net highlighted Bananza as a year-end favorite among Japanese gaming celebrities. Naoki Hamaguchi, director of the Final Fantasy VII Remake series, named Bananza one of his favorite games of 2025.

Awards and nominations
Year	Ceremony	Category	Result	Ref.
2025	Gamescom	Best Gameplay	Won	
2025	Gamescom	Most Entertaining	Nominated	
2025	Gamescom	Best Nintendo Switch 2 Game	Nominated	
2025	Golden Joystick Awards	Ultimate Game of the Year	Nominated	
2025	Golden Joystick Awards	Critics' Choice Award	Won	
2025	Golden Joystick Awards	Console Game of the Year	Nominated	
2025	Golden Joystick Awards	Best Audio Design	Nominated	
2025	The Game Awards	Game of the Year	Nominated	
2025	The Game Awards	Best Family Game	Won	
2026	15th New York Game Awards	Central Park Children's Zoo Award for Best Kids Game	Won	
2026	29th Annual D.I.C.E. Awards	Adventure Game of the Year	Nominated	
2026	29th Annual D.I.C.E. Awards	Outstanding Technical Achievement	Nominated	
2026	26th Game Developers Choice Awards	Game of the Year	Nominated	
2026	26th Game Developers Choice Awards	Best Audio	Honorable mention	
2026	26th Game Developers Choice Awards	Best Design	Nominated	
2026	26th Game Developers Choice Awards	Innovation Award	Nominated	
2026	26th Game Developers Choice Awards	Best Technology	Nominated	
2026	22nd British Academy Games Awards	Animation	Longlisted	
2026	22nd British Academy Games Awards	Family	Nominated	
2026	22nd British Academy Games Awards	Game Design	Longlisted	
2026	22nd British Academy Games Awards	Technical Achievement	Longlisted	
2026	Famitsu Dengeki Game Awards 2025	Game of the Year	Nominated	
2026	Famitsu Dengeki Game Awards 2025	MVC (Best Game Developer/Studio) ("Donkey Kong Bananza Development Team")	Nominated	
2026	Famitsu Dengeki Game Awards 2025	Music	Nominated	
2026	Famitsu Dengeki Game Awards 2025	Action	Won	
2026	CEDEC Awards	Engineering	Won	
2026	CEDEC Awards	Visual Arts	Won	
2026	CEDEC Awards	Game Design	Won	
2026	Japan Game Awards 2026	Award for Excellence	Won	

== Post-release ==
On September 12, 2025, Nintendo released a patch with gameplay adjustments, alongside a demo on the Nintendo eShop. On September 19, Nintendo released nine tracks from the Bananza soundtrack for streaming on the Nintendo Music service; the full soundtrack was released on July 17, 2026. Bananza was one of the games in DK Challenge, a June–September 2026 event for NSO subscribers to complete objectives in Donkey Kong games to obtain digital trading cards.

=== Downloadable content ===
Nintendo released paid downloadable content (DLC), DK Island and Emerald Rush, on September 12. It adds DK Island, the setting of previous Donkey Kong games, as an explorable area, and Emerald Rush, a roguelike mode in which the player collects emeralds for Void Kong, as well as new clothing and collectible statues. Limited-time Emerald Rush events, beginning on October 28, feature special challenges to unlock new character statues. Nintendo added Super Mario-themed crossover content in June 2026 as part of its marketing campaign for the 40th anniversary of Super Mario Bros. (1985).

According to Metacritic, the DLC received "mixed or average reviews". IGN described it as "irresistible" for fans of Donkey Kong and retro games for the Easter eggs referencing Donkey Kong's history, and said Emerald Rush was refreshing and added replay value. However, the DLC received criticism for its US$19.99 price, which critics and players considered excessive given its size. While Eurogamer and TechRadar enjoyed the DLC, they questioned why it was not included at launch or released as a free update.
