= DK Rap =

Song made for the 1999 video game Donkey Kong 64

- Screenshot of Donkey Kong 64's intro, where the song plays. Pictured from left to right: Tiny Kong, Lanky Kong, Donkey Kong, Chunky Kong, and Diddy Kong.

Song by George Andreas, Grant Kirkhope, and Chris Sutherland
- Released: 24 November 1999
- Recorded: 1999
- Genre: Video game; comedy hip hop
- Songwriter: Grant Kirkhope
- Lyricist: George Andreas

Audio sample
- A little bit of the song: file; help

The "DK Rap", also known as "Da Banana Bunch", is a song by the British game developers George Andreas, Grant Kirkhope, and Chris Sutherland. It plays during the opening of Rare and Nintendo's Donkey Kong 64, a 1999 platform game for the Nintendo 64. A comedy hip-hop track, the "DK Rap" describes the characteristics and abilities of Donkey Kong 64's playable characters: Donkey Kong, Tiny Kong, Lanky Kong, Chunky Kong, and Diddy Kong.

Andreas, inspired by Run-DMC, conceived and wrote the "DK Rap", and performed it with Sutherland. Kirkhope composed the melody; he sought to use the "DK Rap" to distinguish Donkey Kong 64's iteration of Donkey Kong from his earlier appearance in Donkey Kong Country (1994). Other Rare staffers contributed background vocals. The "DK Rap" appeared in subsequent Nintendo games, including Super Smash Bros. Melee (2001), Donkey Konga (2003), and Donkey Kong Bananza (2025), as well as in The Super Mario Bros. Movie (2023).

While Andreas, Kirkhope, and Sutherland intended the "DK Rap" as a joke, critics and audiences interpreted it as a serious songwriting attempt. It received negative reviews, with criticism for its lyrics; it has been referred to as one of the worst songs in a video game. In the 2010s, it experienced a resurgence in popularity as an internet meme. Kirkhope wrote a spiritual successor, the "Yooka-Laylee Rap", for Yooka-Laylee (2017), and collaborated with the American rapper Substantial to record a new version for Donkey Kong 64's 25th anniversary in 2024.

== Concept and history ==
The lyrics to the "DK Rap" describe the five playable characters in Donkey Kong 64, one per verse: Donkey Kong, Diddy Kong, Tiny Kong, Lanky Kong, and Chunky Kong. The rap was conceived by Donkey Kong 64 designer George Andreas and composed by Grant Kirkhope. Andreas took inspiration from the band Run-DMC. Kirkhope's goal was to juxtapose Donkey Kong as seen in Donkey Kong Country versus his newest appearance. Andreas wrote and performed the lyrics (alongside Donkey Kong 64 lead programmer Chris Sutherland) while Kirkhope wrote the tune. The chorus includes Rare staffers such as Gregg Mayles, Steve Mayles, Ed Bryan, and Chris Peil. Each character's verse features instrumentals reflecting the instruments the characters possess.

Kirkhope said that the DK Rap was not supposed to be a "serious rap" but rather a joke. Consumer and critical reaction was generally negative, having interpreted the song as being serious. Kirkhope felt surprised that Nintendo objected to the use of the word "hell" and attributed it to the Bible Belt in the United States. The "DK Rap" was not localized for the Japanese release of Donkey Kong 64, nor was it subtitled. Video game designer Shigesato Itoi provided a Japanese translation of the "DK Rap" on his personal website.

== Super Smash Bros. remix ==
The "DK Rap" was remixed in Super Smash Bros. Melee. Composer Hirokazu Ando was to be in charge of composition, but due to technical issues, director Masahiro Sakurai and composer Shogo Sakai had to assist. To overcome these issues, they played the background audio and recorded the rap over it. Because the remixed rap is faster, it was not possible for them to record it live. Some characters in the theme have higher tempos than others. While the DJ (James W. Norwood Jr.) practiced, they recorded him, using what good came out of it and mixing it together. The rap took two days to record.

== Legacy ==
The "DK Rap" is the first song in the 1999 Donkey Kong 64 Original Soundtrack, where it was named "Da Banana Bunch". Around the release of Donkey Kong 64, Nintendo of America hosted a promotion called the "DK Rap Attack Contest" where people could submit a recording of themselves singing their own version of the "DK Rap". The winner would receive a Donkey Kong 64/Nintendo 64 console bundle, a trip to Nintendo of America's headquarters in Redmond, Washington, and their video would be hosted on the official Donkey Kong 64 website. The song was made available for download on Nintendo's website for use with this promotion.

A new version of the "DK Rap" was featured in the 2001 GameCube Nintendo crossover fighting game Super Smash Bros. Melee, performed by James W. Norwood Jr. who provided different voices for every verse. The original theme features the word "hell", which was changed to "heck" for the Melee release. This version was later reused in subsequent Super Smash Bros. games, and was featured as a song in the 2003 GameCube music game Donkey Konga. It was also released on the album Donkey Konga: The Hottest Hits. In English-language versions of Super Smash Bros. for Nintendo 3DS and Wii U, and Super Smash Bros. Ultimate, Donkey Kong's crowd cheer is a variant of the "DK Rap". As part of a Kickstarter stretch goal, Grant Kirkhope wrote a spiritual successor to the "DK Rap", titled the "Yooka-Laylee Rap", for Yooka-Laylee.

In the second chapter of Deltarune, a role-playing video game by Toby Fox, the outro lyrics of the "DK Rap" are referenced when inspecting a basket of fruit in a convenience store owned by Sans.

The "DK Rap" is featured as Donkey Kong's entrance theme in the 2023 film The Super Mario Bros. Movie. Seth Rogen, who voices Donkey Kong in the film, noted the song's reputation as "one of the worst rap songs of all time" but also stated that he was amused by it upon listening to it in full for the first time, giving it a "10 out of 10 bananas" rating. Grant Kirkhope criticized the film for not crediting him; he was later told that Nintendo's policy was not to credit composers on music sourced from games that the company owned.

For the 25th anniversary of the "DK Rap" release, Grant Kirkhope and Substantial included a re-imagined a new version on the Materia Collective album Rare Treats: Donkey Kong 64 Revisited.

The "DK Rap" is featured in the 2025 Nintendo Switch 2 game Donkey Kong Bananza.

== Reception ==
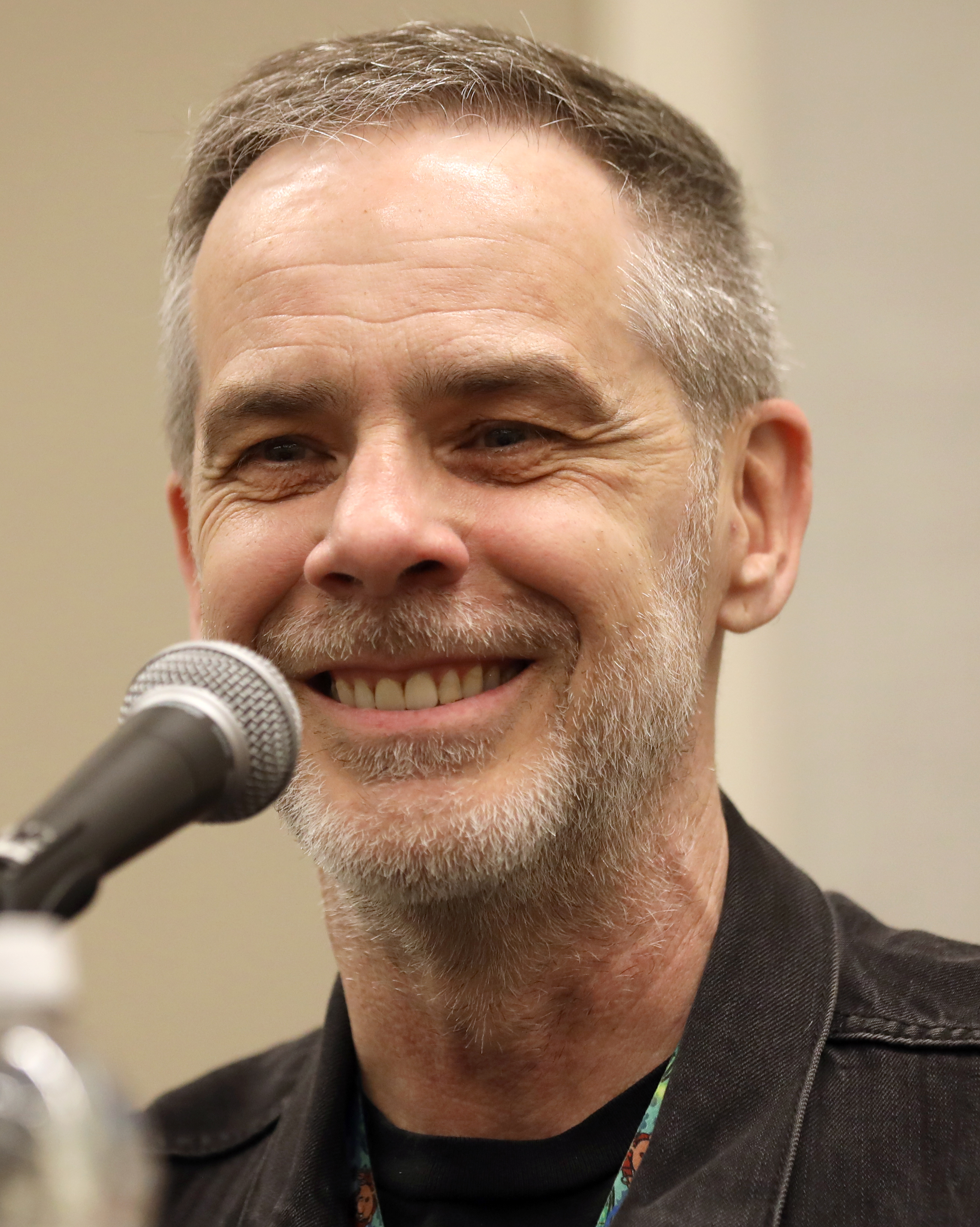
Grant Kirkhope, the game's composer, expressed joy that more people consider the song funny.

Since its appearance in Donkey Kong 64, the "DK Rap" has received generally negative reception. It was awarded "dubious awards" for its quality. It also received criticism for its use of the word "hell" despite its ESRB rating. 1Up.com's Scott Sharkey included it in his list of the "top 5 cringe-inducing videogame raps" and claimed that it was a "100% reliable method of emptying the place" in which he took his cigarette breaks. He also called it one of the worst video game themes and called it "so-bad-it's-good" due to its "fundamental cluelessness". He stated, "Really, when I think of the improvisational musical art of the inner city underclasses the first thing that comes to mind is a tie-wearing Japanese gorilla. Yeah." Destructoid's Dale North included it in his list of the most obnoxious video game songs and joked that he imagined the Fresh Prince of Bel-Air character Carlton Banks dancing to it. The song was performed on a pop show in Japan by a high-profile Japanese rapper. Composer Grant Kirkhope compared the theme's recent resurgence to popularity, including as an Internet meme, to the band ABBA and expressed joy that more people consider the song funny. Video Game Music Online criticized the Donkey Konga album remix due to its new vocalist and attempt to introduce authentic rap elements.

NGamer UK included it in their article about the "evil side of kiddy gaming" and called it "so-bad-it'll-make-your-ears-bleed rotten". The "DK Rap" was included in IGN's list of the worst in-game quotes at number eight. The staff claimed that the song "comes to mind" when they think of video game's "all-time terrible moments". They stated that it was the "only song in history that sounds like vomit". Game Informer's O'Dell Harmon included it at #2 in his list of the "freshest rap songs in video games". GamesRadar's Bob Mackey claimed that the "DK Rap" was the biggest addition to the Donkey Kong character in Donkey Kong 64. Composer Grant Kirkhope stated that staff of Big Huge Games (the company at which he was employed at the time) made fun of him for the song and added that his tombstone will read, "here lies the body of Grant Kirkhope, he wrote the DK Rap, may God have mercy on his soul". The lyric "His coconut gun can fire in spurts. If he shoots ya, it's gonna hurt!" was named the fourth worst game line ever in the January 2002 issue of Electronic Gaming Monthly. OC Weekly's Peter Mai included the song in his list of the "Top 5 Cheesiest (Yet Somehow Awesome) Video Game Songs". He stated, "[it is] probably the worst rap song ever written, but you know you still love it."

== See also ==
- "Mario Brothers Rap"
