= Eveline Fischer =

British video game composer (born 1969)

Eveline Novakovich
- Born: Eveline Fischer; 1969 (age 56–57); Christchurch, Dorset, England
- Occupations: Composer, voice actress
- Years active: 1994–2007
- Employer: Rare
- Known for: Donkey Kong Country, Perfect Dark

Eveline Novakovic (née Fischer; born 1969) is a British video game composer best known for her career at Rare. She contributed music to Donkey Kong Country, composed the vast majority of the soundtrack for Donkey Kong Country 3: Dixie Kong's Double Trouble!, and provided voice acting and sound effects for other games from the studio. Notably, she voiced the main heroine, Joanna Dark, in the Nintendo 64 game Perfect Dark.

== Biography ==
Born to a mother who was a fan of theatre and ballet, and a father who introduced her to new genres and artists, Novakovic studied piano, church organ, and violin. She first studied music at Durham University, then pursued a Master's in Medieval Music at Newcastle University and a Postgraduate Diploma in Electroacoustic Composition at Bournemouth University.

Novakovic joined video game developer Rare in 1993 when the company was transitioning from the NES to SNES. At that time, the British company had only one composer, David Wise, who worked for the company as a freelancer. As one of only two women working on the development teams at that time, and the only in-house musician, Novakovic described the initial experience as "daunting to begin with," but eventually noted, "what I found though was a genuine camaraderie from the top down."

Her first project for the console was Donkey Kong Country, alongside David Wise and Robin Beanland, where she was responsible for seven tracks, including "Simian Segue", "Treetop Rock", and "Voices of the Temple".

Despite the "overwhelmingly positive" critical reception to Donkey Kong Country's soundtrack, Novakovic moved on to work on the soundtrack for Ken Griffey Jr.'s Winning Run for the same console. After the success of Donkey Kong Country 2: Diddy's Kong Quest, Rare greenlit a sequel, and Novakovic was called by Wise to handle most of the soundtrack, including tracks such as "Nuts and Bolts", "Water World", and "Mill Fever".

Following Double Trouble!, Novakovic worked on titles for the Game Boy console. She arranged and implemented Robin Beanland's score for Conker's Pocket Tales for the Game Boy Color and also converted her own Donkey Kong Country 3 soundtrack for the Game Boy remake: Donkey Kong Land III.

After her work on Game Boy, Novakovic began to explore her increasing interest in sound design. She contributed voices to a number of Nintendo 64 games over the next few years, including Perfect Dark, where she voiced the main character Joanna Dark.

In 2005, Novakovic left Rare after completing voice work for Kameo: Elements of Power for the Xbox 360 and eventually retired from the games industry in 2007.

=== Influences ===
Novakovic has described her music tastes as a blend of jazz, blues, medieval music and percussion. She has cited major musical influences historic artists such as Sergei Rachmaninoff, Francis Poulenc, Gabriel Fauré, Franz Liszt, Bach, Charles-Marie Widor, Carl Orff, César Franck, and contemporary artists like Marie Claire Alain, Ella Fitzgerald, Nina Simone, Duke Ellington, Oscar Peterson, John Williams, Hans Zimmer and Amadinda.

== Personal life ==
Eveline was credited by the name E. Fischer in earlier games she worked on. When she married in the early 2000s, she adopted the name Novakovic.

== Video game credits ==
=== Music/sound ===
Title	Year	Notes
Donkey Kong Country (SNES version)	1994	With Robin Beanland and David Wise
Donkey Kong Country 3: Dixie Kong's Double Trouble!	1996	With David Wise
Ken Griffey, Jr.'s Winning Run	1996	
Donkey Kong Land III	1997	
Banjo-Kazooie	1998	Sound effects
Conker's Pocket Tales	1999	With Robin Beanland
Donkey Kong 64	1999	Development team
Mickey's Speedway USA (GBC version)	2000	Development team
Donkey Kong Country (GBC version)	2000	
Perfect Dark	2000	
Banjo-Tooie	2000	Special thanks
Donkey Kong Country (GBA version)	2003	Sound effects
Donkey Kong Country 2 (GBA version)	2004	Sound effects
Banjo Pilot	2005	Sound effects
It's Mr. Pants	2005	Sound effects
Kameo: Elements of Power	2005	Sound effects
Viva Piñata	2006	Production, sound effects, VO recording and compression encoding

=== Voice acting ===
Title	Role(s)
Diddy Kong Racing	Pipsy the Mouse
Banjo-Kazooie	Tooty, Brentilda
Jet Force Gemini	Vela
Donkey Kong 64	Tiny Kong, Wrinkly Kong, Banana Fairy, Banana Fairy Princess, Mermaid, Candy Kong
Perfect Dark	Joanna Dark, Velvet Dark
Banjo-Tooie	Humba Wumba, Honey B.
Dinosaur Planet	Krystal
Diddy Kong Pilot (2001 version)	Dixie Kong, Candy Kong (unimplemented in 2001 version)
Banjo-Kazooie: Grunty's Revenge	Honey B.
Donkey Kong Country 2 (GBA version)	Dixie Kong (archived Tiny Kong recordings)
Banjo-Pilot	Humba Wumba
Conker: Live and Reloaded	Additional character voices
Donkey Kong Country 3 (GBA version)	Dixie Kong (archived Tiny Kong recordings)
Kameo: Elements of Power	Additional character voices
Perfect Dark Zero	Additional character voices

== See also ==
- DK Jamz
