= Chris Sutherland (programmer) =

British video game programmer and voice actor

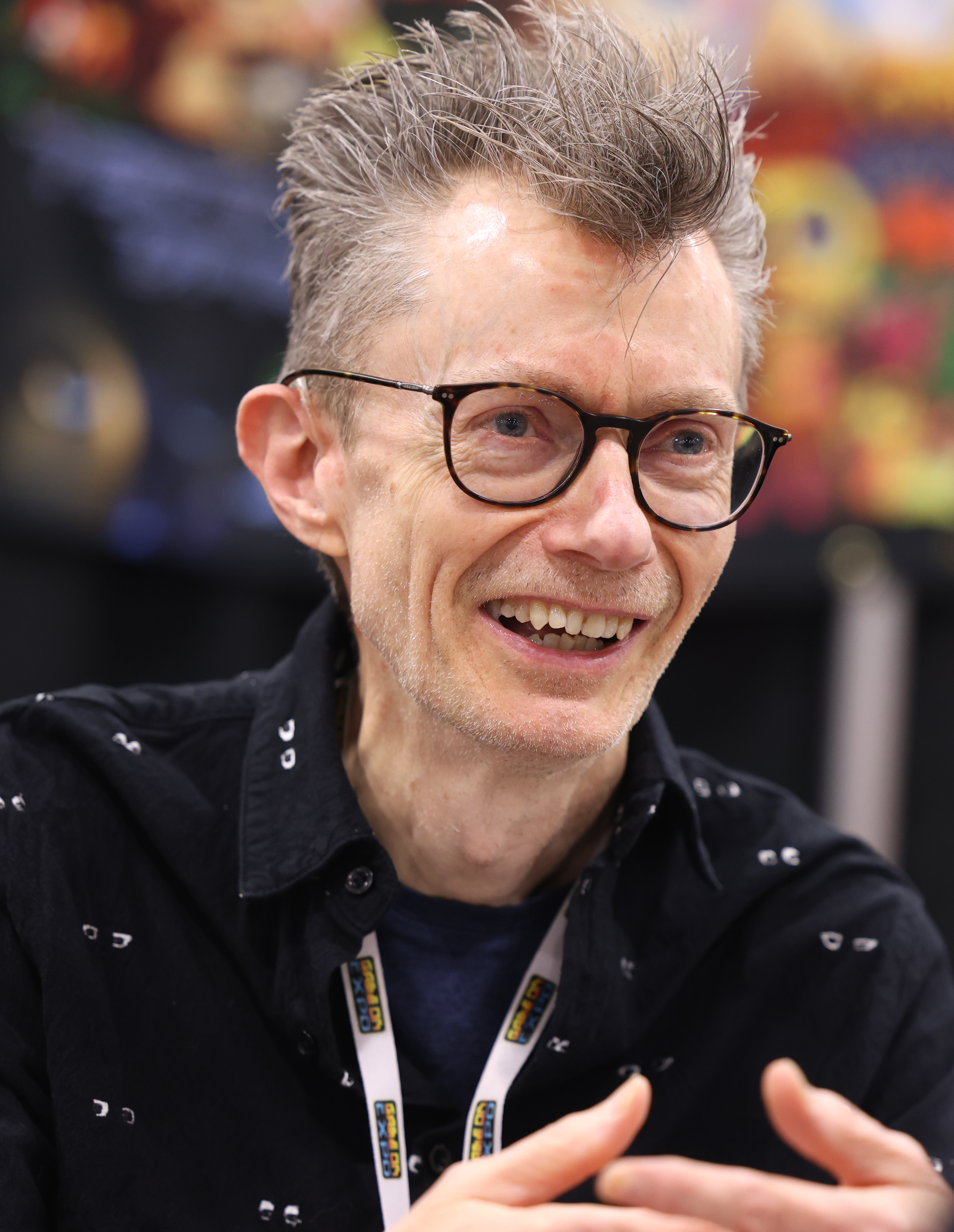
- Sutherland in 2025
- Occupations: Programmer, voice actor
- Years active: 1989–present
- Employer(s): Rare, Playtonic Games
- Known for: Banjo Kazooie, Killer Instinct

Chris Sutherland is an English video game programmer and voice actor. He is best known for programming several titles while at Rare, including Battletoads Arcade, Donkey Kong Country 2: Diddy's Kong Quest, and Banjo-Kazooie, before co-founding Playtonic Games with several other Rare employees. During this time, he also voiced several characters for the company, including Banjo & Kazooie, Diddy Kong, and the announcer of the Killer Instinct series.

== Biography ==
In 1989, Sutherland joined the British video game company Rare as a programmer for The Amazing Spider-Man (1990) on Game Boy. Later, he became the lead programmer for Donkey Kong Country (1994), and was responsible for implementing the game's pre-rendered graphics, a process he described as challenging due to the need to reduce the characters' frames of animation. He continued to act as lead programmer for its sequel, Donkey Kong Country 2: Diddy's Kong Quest (1995), and Banjo-Kazooie (1998) and Banjo-Tooie (2000). During this time, Sutherland provided voice acting for characters in several Rare games, including as Diddy Kong in Diddy Kong Racing (1997) and Donkey Kong 64 (1999), as well as the Banjo-Kazooie series' eponymous characters in all of their appearances. Additionally, he has appeared as the announcer for all three games in the Killer Instinct series.

In 2014, Sutherland left Rare and became one of the founding members of Playtonic Games, alongside other Rare employees including Steve Hurst, Steve Mayles, Gavin Price, Jens Restemeier, and Mark Stevenson.

== Credits ==
Year	Title	Role
1990	The Amazing Spider-Man	Programmer
1991	Sneaky Snakes	Programmer
1994	Battletoads	Programmer, voice actor (Announcer, Rash, Zitz, Pimple)
1994	Donkey Kong Country	Lead programmer, voice actor (GBA version only) (Diddy Kong, King K. Rool, Kritter, Krusha, Gnawty)
1994	Killer Instinct	Voice actor (Announcer)
1995	Donkey Kong Country 2: Diddy's Kong Quest	Lead programmer, voice actor (GBA version only) (Diddy Kong, King K. Rool)
1996	Killer Instinct 2	Voice actor (Announcer)
1996	Killer Instinct Gold	Voice actor (Announcer)
1997	Diddy Kong Racing	Voice actor (Diddy Kong, Banjo, Krunch, Taj the Genie)
1998	Banjo-Kazooie	Lead programmer, voice actor (Banjo & Kazooie)
1999	Donkey Kong 64	Lead programmer, voice actor (Diddy Kong, Lanky Kong, Chunky Kong, King K. Rool, Krusha), music vocals ("DK Rap")
2000	Perfect Dark	Voice actor (Daniel Carrington, Trent Easton, DataDyne Guards)
2000	Banjo-Tooie	Lead programmer, voice actor (Banjo & Kazooie)
2002	Star Fox Adventures	Voice actor (SnowHorn Tribe)
2003	Banjo-Kazooie: Grunty's Revenge	Voice actor (Banjo & Kazooie)
2003	Grabbed by the Ghoulies	Programmer, voice actor (Banjo Head, Kazooie Head, Vampire Chicken)
2005	Banjo-Pilot	Voice actor (Banjo & Kazooie)
2005	Kameo: Elements of Power	Voice actor (Old Ma'wood)
2006	Viva Pinata	Producer, voice actor (Jardiniero)
2008	Banjo-Kazooie: Nuts & Bolts	Voice actor (Banjo & Kazooie)
2010	Kinect Sports	Producer
2011	Kinect Sports: Season Two	Project manager
2013	Killer Instinct	Voice actor (Announcer "Chris")
2014	Kinect Sports Rivals	Project manager
2017	Yooka-Laylee	Director, programmer, voice actor (Yooka and Laylee), music vocals ("Yooka-Laylee Rap")
2018	Super Smash Bros. Ultimate	Voice actor (Banjo & Kazooie)
2019	Yooka-Laylee and the Impossible Lair	Director, programmer, voice actor (Yooka and Laylee)
2020	Mighty Fight Federation	Voice actor (Yooka and Laylee)
2021	Terrain of Magical Expertise	Voice actor (Spirit Gate)
