= Procedural design =

In software design, Procedural Design (SPD) converts and translates structural elements into procedural explanations. SPD starts straight after data design and architectural design. This has now been mostly abandoned mostly due to the rise in preference of Object Oriented Programming and design patterns.
