= Donkey Kong Country 3 =

1996 video game

Donkey Kong Country 3: Dixie Kong's Double Trouble!
- North American SNES box art
- Developer: Rare
- Publisher: Nintendo
- Director: Tim Stamper
- Producer: Andrew Collard
- Designers: Andrew Collard; Paul Weaver
- Programmer: Mark Wilson
- Artists: Mark Stevenson; Neil Crook
- Composer: Eveline Fischer (Note: Additional music by David Wise)
- Series: Donkey Kong
- Platforms: Super NES, Game Boy Advance
- Release: SNES: NA: 18 November 1996; JP: 23 November 1996; PAL: 19 December 1996; Game Boy Advance: EU: 4 November 2005; NA: 7 November 2005; JP: 1 December 2005
- Genre: Platform
- Modes: Single-player, multiplayer

Donkey Kong Country 3: Dixie Kong's Double Trouble! is a 1996 platform game developed by Rare and published by Nintendo for the Super Nintendo Entertainment System (SNES). It is the third installment of the Donkey Kong Country series, and serves as a sequel to 1995's Donkey Kong Country 2: Diddy's Kong Quest. It was also re-released for the Game Boy Advance (GBA) in 2005. The game was made available to download on the Wii's Virtual Console service in 2007, as well as for the Wii U's Virtual Console in 2014.

The plot centers on Dixie Kong and her cousin, Kiddy Kong, in their attempts to save the captured Donkey Kong and Diddy Kong from the series' villain King K. Rool. The game is set in the "Northern Kremisphere", a fictionalized version of northern Europe and Canada. Dixie Kong's Double Trouble! utilises the same Silicon Graphics technology from its predecessors, which features the use of pre-rendered 3D imagery. The game received positive reviews upon release; critics praised the visuals and various aspects of gameplay, but noted a lack of innovation.

== Gameplay ==
Dixie Kong, with Kiddy Kong standing by in the background

Dixie Kong's Double Trouble! is a platform game where players control Dixie Kong and her baby cousin, Kiddy Kong, through 8 worlds which comprise a total of 48 levels. Many of the gameplay elements from previous games in the series mark a return in this game, such as barrels, bonus levels which reward the player with special "bonus coins", DK coins, animal helpers and a multiplayer mode. Both of the two playable Kongs have unique abilities, such as Dixie's ability to slow her descent by spinning her ponytail, and Kiddy's ability to bounce across open water. The Kongs may also pick each other up to throw each other around levels; the impact of the other player-character can reveal cracked floors, hidden switches or secret areas. At any time, the player can switch Kongs during a level.

Levels in the game include a mixture of platforming, swimming and on-rails levels. They are based around several returning themes including forests, cliff-sides, factories and mountain tops. The level design is more diverse compared to its predecessors, which includes more complex puzzles and obstacles. Every level has an enemy called a Koin; each of these enemies bears the DK Coin of their respective level, holding it as a shield. As these enemies always face towards the player, they must be defeated by throwing a steel barrel over them so it bounces off a wall behind them in order to strike them from behind. The game overworld is also more complex, allowing players to explore between each area instead of forcing them along a linear path. To achieve this, the game includes several vehicles such as a speedboat and hovercraft which can be used to traverse the overworld and access different worlds.

The game features "animal friends", which return from its predecessors. Returning animals include Enguarde the swordfish, Squitter the spider and Squawks the parrot. New animals include Ellie the elephant, who can suck up water through her trunk to spray enemies with, and Parry the "parallel bird", who flies directly above the player-characters and can be used to collect out-of-reach items. As in the previous game, players can directly control animals instead of just riding them. Scattered around the Northern Kremisphere overworld are the Brothers Bear, a family of bears who provide the players with hints, key items or other services. Players can collect items in levels to trade with the bears for other items or to help progress to later levels; one such item is the Bear Coin, which acts as the game's currency. Other members from the Kong family, such as Wrinkly Kong, Swanky Kong, and Funky Kong, can also be found around the overworld, each of whom offer their own services.

== Plot ==
=== Characters ===
The player-characters in the game are Dixie Kong, who is Diddy Kong's girlfriend, and her younger cousin, Kiddy Kong. Scattered around the overworld are various other characters: Wrinkly Kong appears in "save caves", which when entered allow the player to save their game; Funky Kong plays a key role in the game, as he supplies the player with vehicles to traverse the overworld; and Swanky Kong, reappearing from the previous game, allows players to challenge Cranky Kong in a contest involving throwing balls at targets in exchange for Bear Coins. New to the series are the Brothers Bear, thirteen bears providing the player with services in exchange for Bear Coins, some of whom are instrumental for advancing through the game. The main villain of the previous games, King K. Rool, reappears under the moniker of "Baron K. Roolenstein".

=== Story ===
Shortly after the events of Diddy's Kong Quest, Donkey Kong and Diddy Kong suddenly disappear in the Northern Kremisphere. Dixie Kong sets off to find the pair and is joined by her cousin Kiddy Kong and aided by Funky Kong's vehicles to traverse the land. They reach Kastle KAOS, the lair of a robot named KAOS, who was thought to be the new leader of the Kremlings. After they destroy KAOS, the curtain in the background rolls up to reveal the robot was being controlled by Baron K. Roolenstein, the new moniker of King K. Rool. After the duo fights him, Donkey and Diddy pop out of the destroyed KAOS, implying they were being used to power the robot.

Dixie and Kiddy uncover the extinct volcanic island of Krematoa. They meet Boomer, an exiled member of the Brothers Bear, inside his Anderson shelter. He agrees to destroy the rocks hindering the path in exchange for bonus coins. After Dixie and Kiddy find all bonus coins and five cogwheels hidden in Krematoa, the duo give the cogs to Boomer, who puts them into a machine which re-activates Krematoa, revealing the Knautilus, K. Roolenstein's personal submarine. The Kongs board the submarine and battle against him in there, but he escapes once again.

Once the Kongs collect all DK coins, they give the coins to Funky, who in exchange gives them a gyrocopter. The duo then finds an enigmatic creature called the Banana Bird Queen, who is bound to a barrier cast by K. Roolenstein. She tells the Kongs that she can only be freed if her separated children are returned to her, and that she will rid the land of K. Rool if she is freed. The Kongs find each of her children in a cave, where one of the birds is trapped in a crystal which shatters when the Kongs complete a Simon-like memory game. After rescuing them and completing a large trade sequence between the Brothers Bear, the Kongs return the children to the Queen. The Queen and her children all sing, annihilating the barrier. The Queen proceeds to chase K. Rool, who is fleeing in a hovercraft. When she catches up to him, she drops a giant eggshell on top of him, which Dixie and Kiddy land on. The Kongs repeatedly knock on the shell, annoying the captured K. Rool.

== Development and release ==
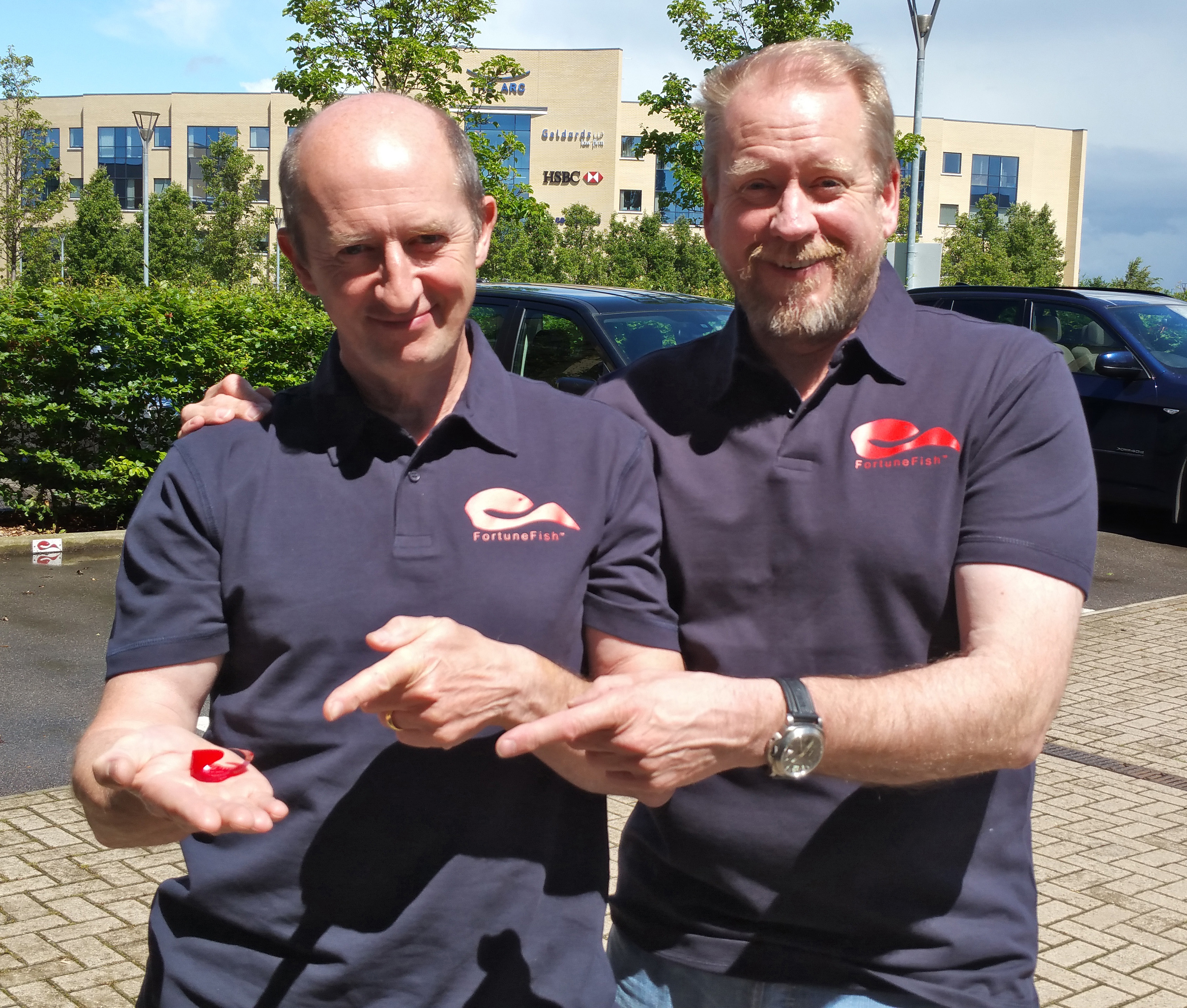
Tim Stamper (right) directed Donkey Kong Country 3: Dixie Kong's Double Trouble!

Development of Dixie Kong's Double Trouble! began shortly after the release of Diddy's Kong Quest, utilising the same Silicon Graphics (SGI) and Advanced Computer Modelling (ACM) rendering technology as its predecessors, in which pre-rendered 3D animations are turned into 2D sprites. Rare founder Tim Stamper re-took the role as the game's director, whereas Rare staffers Andrew Collard and Paul Weaver designed the game. The game's soundtrack was composed by Eveline Fischer, with additional tracks by series composer David Wise, and Fischer producing most of the game's music.

Dixie Kong's Double Trouble! was first released in North America on 18 November 1996, followed by Japan on 23 November and Europe and Australia on 13 December. It was later made available to download on the Wii Virtual Console service in 2007, as well as for the Wii U Virtual Console in 2014. It was later released on the Nintendo Switch via the Nintendo Classics service on 18 December 2020. While the game sold over 3.5 million units worldwide, it has been suggested that its sales were hurt by its November release, which was when Nintendo 64 console was popular after its September launch. 1.7 million copies were sold in Japan and 1.12 million copies sold in the United States.

A port was later released for the Game Boy Advance in November 2005, which includes a new soundtrack composed by Wise; the team originally had a "vague hope" to have both the original and the new soundtrack in that version, but this proved unfeasible due to cartridge and time constraints.

The SNES version also included an unlockable Christmas theme for the bonus levels. By entering "Merry" on the file select screen, the stars and bananas will be changed to bells and presents and the background music will change to Christmas music.

== Reception ==
=== Contemporary ===
Contemporary SNES reception

Aggregate score
Aggregator	Score
GameRankings	83%

Review scores
Publication	Score
AllGame	4.5/5
Computer and Video Games	4/5
Electronic Gaming Monthly	8/10, 8/10, 8.5/10, 8/10
Famitsu	8/10, 8/10, 7/10, 7/10
Game Informer	9/10
Hyper	88%
Next Generation	3/5
Official Nintendo Magazine	98/100
Super Game Power	5/5

The game received positive reviews upon release, holding an aggregate score of 83% from GameRankings. Nintendo Magazine System (NMS) called it "king of the Kongs", surpassing its predecessors in every area. Doctor Devon of GamePro saw it as one of the best 16-bit games and a worthy swan song for the SNES. Electronic Gaming Monthly (EGM) contributors praised its polish and entertainment value, with Shawn Smith calling it a library must-have. Paul Davies of Computer and Video Games viewed it as the "pinnacle of achievement for the Super NES", though he docked points for familiarity. AllGame's Brett Alan Weiss and Next Generation commended its quality but noted it offered "more of the same", appealing most to series fans. EGM editors named Donkey Kong Country 3 a runner-up for both Super NES Game of the Year (behind Tetris Attack) and Side-Scrolling Game of the Year (behind Guardian Heroes).

Reviewers lauded the game's graphics for their sharp, detailed visuals and fluid animations. NMS called the visuals "astounding" and the "most detailed, beautifully animated Super NES graphics". Doctor Devon described the backgrounds as "sharp and colorful", singling out the underwater levels as "suitable for framing". Weiss claimed the graphics were so impressive they "have to be seen to be believed", and Steve Polak of Hyper described the "lush" environments as a "kaleidoscope of colour", noting the snowfields and waterfalls. EGM and Next Generation also praised the crisper, more detailed visuals compared to Donkey Kong Country 2, with Davies regarding the animation quality as flawless. The reviewers in Famitsu said the graphics were on par with games released for newer systems such as the PlayStation and Sega Saturn.

The soundtrack and sound effects were praised for their atmospheric quality despite their similarity to previous entries. NMS lauded the "brilliant" opening theme and "spot-on jingles" for each level as well as the "top" sound effects. Doctor Devon said the "great" music and effects created a "dense sonic atmosphere", singling out the unique themes of the Brothers Bear as noteworthy. Weiss likened the music to a professional orchestral recording, while Sushi-X of EGM appreciated the "hip sounds" for contributing to the game's polish.

Critics commended the retention of the tight and responsive platforming gameplay of previous entries, with the new features adding depth, but noted the lack of significant innovation. NMS highlighted the "slick, finely-tuned action" and "massive gameplay variety". Doctor Devon praised the "effortless" controls, with new mechanics like Kiddy Kong's floor-bashing and Ellie's barrel-throwing adding variety. Next Generation noted the elimination of control "slop" from earlier titles, making movement precise and intuitive. However, Weiss and Game Informer pointed out that the gameplay stuck closely to the Donkey Kong Country formula, with EGM's Dan Hsu noting some levels were too linear, lacking openness. Polak acknowledged it as "same shit, different wrapper", but argued this was not detrimental given the series' quality.

The introduction of RPG-style elements, particularly through the Brothers Bear, was appreciated for adding depth and variety. Davies and NMS's Dave Upchurch praised the "RPG-ish" elements, such as the interactions with the Brothers Bear, for adding a pleasing depth without alienating platforming fans. Polak highlighted the need to collect special objects, such as the different coins, to access hidden areas. The addition of new characters like Kiddy Kong and Ellie, along with vehicles like the hovercraft, was noted by Doctor Devon and Polak as a fresh twist, though Weiss suggested these additions did not feel "startlingly unique". Doctor Devon warned that the new characters' contribution to the game's tone of "extreme youthfulness" may not appeal to some, and Polak also described Ellie as "sickeningly cute", but said her fear of mice added challenge.

The game was said to offer a substantial challenge with its large levels, numerous secrets, and high replay value. NMS emphasized the game's "huge levels" and "stiff challenge", with secret bonuses and hidden banana birds ensuring long-term engagement. NMS's David McComb noted a gradual difficulty increase, becoming frustrating by later encounters, whereas Polak suggested it was easier than Donkey Kong Country 2, speculating the developers were targeting a younger audience. Sushi-X and Game Informer highlighted the high replay value due to the secret areas and bonus rounds, which would be appealing to completionists.

Criticism was focused on the game being too similar to its predecessors, though it was regarded as a high-quality entry in the series for its refinements despite the lack of innovation. Weiss and Next Generation noted that the game "leaves well enough alone", sticking closely to the established formula, which they saw as a strength for fans but a limitation for those seeking novelty. EGM's Hsu and Crispin Boyer described it as "more of the same", with Boyer calling it an extension rather than a true sequel. Doctor Devon acknowledged a "been there, beat that" attitude would be invoked in some, while Polak admitted it was not a massive leap forward but defended its quality as a polished platformer.

=== Game Boy Advance version ===
Game Boy Advance reception

Aggregate scores
Aggregator	Score
GameRankings	75%
Metacritic	77/100

Review scores
Publication	Score
Eurogamer	7/10
Game Informer	8.5/10
GamePro	3/5
GameSpot	7.8/10
GameSpy	4/5
IGN	7.5/10
Jeuxvideo.com	18/20
Nintendo Power	8/10
PALGN	8/10

The Game Boy Advance version was also met with "generally favorable" reviews according to Metacritic. Reviewing the Game Boy Advance version, Frank Provo of GameSpot stated that the graphics were colourful, vibrant and "top-notch". Although he stated that the Game Boy Advance port's music was "catchy" and "just as good as the originals", he noted that devotees to the original SNES game may not like it. A reviewer from GamePro thought that the graphics appeared "washed out" on the system's backlit screen, stating that the pre-rendered sprites did not "show up very well". A reviewer from Jeuxvideo asserted that the various aspects of gameplay made Dixie Kong's Double Trouble! a hallmark of the series.

=== Retrospective ===
SNES retrospective reception

Review scores
Publication	Score
Eurogamer	7/10
IGN	8.5/10
Jeuxvideo.com	16/20
Nintendo Life	9/10

Retrospective assessments of the game remained positive. Lucas Thomas of IGN opined that Dixie Kong's Double Trouble!'s visuals were not as awe-inspiring as the pre-rendered C.G.I. of Donkey Kong Country, but admitted that they "still looked great" for the third installment. He thought compared to the other Donkey Kong Country games, the music in Dixie Kong's Double Trouble! stands out the least, although he stated that it was an "impressive effort". Marcel van Duyn of Nintendo Life praised the game's visuals and detailed backgrounds, stating that they were "fantastic" for the SNES. He commented that the soundtrack was not as "legendary" as it was in its previous instalment, but still admitted that it had some "great" tracks. In addition, Van Duyn criticised the Game Boy Advance's port for replacing all of the original music with new compositions. In 2018, Complex listed the game number 65 in their The Best Super Nintendo Games of All Time. IGN ranked Donkey Kong Country 3 58th on their "Top 100 SNES Games of All Time" and described the game as a satisfying conclusion to Rare's cycle of 16-bit platformers.
