= Donkey Kong Country 2 =

1995 video game

Donkey Kong Country 2: Diddy's Kong Quest
- North American SNES box art
- Developer: Rare
- Publisher: Nintendo
- Director: Tim Stamper
- Producer: Gregg Mayles
- Designers: Gregg Mayles; Andrew Collard
- Programmer: Chris Sutherland
- Artists: Steve Mayles; Mark Stevenson; Adrian Smith
- Writers: Gregg Mayles; Leigh Loveday
- Composer: David Wise
- Series: Donkey Kong
- Platforms: Super NES; Game Boy Advance
- Release: SNES: JP: 21 November 1995; NA: 4 December 1995 (Note: Reported US release date varies between 20 November and 4 December.); EU: 14 December 1995; Game Boy Advance: PAL: 25 June 2004; JP: 1 July 2004; NA: 15 November 2004
- Genre: Platform
- Modes: Single-player, multiplayer

Donkey Kong Country 2: Diddy's Kong Quest (Note: Originally released in Japan as Super Donkey Kong 2: Dixie & Diddy (スーパードンキーコング2 ディクシー&ディディー, Sūpā Donkī Kongu Tsū: Dikushī ando Didī)) is a 1995 platform game developed by Rare and published by Nintendo for the Super Nintendo Entertainment System (SNES). It was released on 21 November 1995 in Japan, 4 December in North America, and 14 December in Europe. It is the second installment of the Donkey Kong Country series and the sequel to Donkey Kong Country (1994). It was re-released for the Game Boy Advance (GBA) in 2004. The game was made available for download on the Virtual Console for the Wii and Wii U in 2007 and 2015, respectively.

Players control Diddy Kong and his girlfriend Dixie Kong, who must rescue Donkey Kong after he is kidnapped by King K. Rool. The game is set on Crocodile Isle, with eight worlds of varying environments, totaling 52 levels. The game uses the same Silicon Graphics (SGI) technology from the original, which features the use of pre-rendered 3D imagery. Diddy's Kong Quest received acclaim and is regarded as one of the greatest 2D platformers of all time. Praise was directed at its soundtrack, which is considered one of the greatest of all time, as well as its graphics and gameplay. It was the second best-selling game of 1995, and the sixth best-selling game on the SNES. It was followed by Donkey Kong Country 3: Dixie Kong's Double Trouble! in 1996.

== Gameplay ==
At the end of each level, the player must land on a target pad from a certain height for a chance to earn one of a series of quickly changing rewards, such as an extra life balloon.

Donkey Kong Country 2: Diddy's Kong Quest is a 2D side-scrolling platformer in which the player controls either Diddy Kong or his girlfriend Dixie Kong through 52 varying levels over eight different worlds. The main objective of the game is to rescue Donkey Kong from King K. Rool. The game features a wide number of enemies, which include land-based reptilian Kremlings, rats, porcupines, bees, and vultures. Enemies in underwater sections include pufferfish, stingrays, starfish, and piranhas. Each world culminates with a boss fight, which is required to be defeated in order to progress to the next world. The player-characters can defeat most hostiles by jumping on them, cartwheeling through them, or throwing a barrel or other throwable objects at them. When hit by an enemy, the active character runs away and control will switch to the other character. The player can reclaim their partner from barrels marked DK. If both characters die, the player will lose a life and will restart from either the beginning of the level or from the last checkpoint, which comes in the form of a star-painted barrel. If the player loses all of their lives, the game will end with a Game Over.

Diddy and Dixie have unique attributes; Diddy is more agile and will run faster, whereas Dixie has a higher jump and can spin her hair to glide. The player can pick up the other character and throw them in any direction, similar to barrels. The game features "animal friends", which returns from its predecessor. Playable animals include Squitter the spider, Rambi the rhino, Rattly the snake, Enguarde the swordfish, and Squawks the parrot. These animals have unique abilities, such as Rambi's ability to charge at enemies, Squawks' ability of flight and spitting eggs, and Rattly's ability to jump to extreme heights.

The game features environmental effects throughout some levels, which include fog, rain, and thunderstorms. Some levels feature different mechanics and settings, such as underwater sections, riding a skull-shaped roller coaster, grappling onto vines, and beehive levels which feature sticky honey-covered surfaces. The game features barrels that will propel the player in any direction they are facing. Aside from checkpoint barrels, some give the player temporary invincibility or an "animal friend". Hidden bonus barrels, hidden entrances masked by walls breakable with a throwable object, Rambi, or Enguarde, and cannons activatible with cannonballs transport the player to a bonus game, which features a challenge such as eliminating all enemies in order to earn a "Kremcoin". In addition, there are some barrels that can only be activated by a specific character. Players may earn extra lives by collecting balloons, earning 100 bananas or collecting four letters which spell "KONG".

The player can achieve a maximum completion score of 102% for their save file by completing all levels and bosses, completing all bonus challenges, collecting all DK coins within the Lost World and visiting each of the four Kong family members at least once.

The game is Dixie Kong's first appearance in the Donkey Kong franchise. Other characters include Cranky Kong, situated in "Monkey Museum", who is back due to "popular demand" to divulge secrets of the game world and provide comic relief, as well as offer advice. Wrinkly Kong, the wife of Cranky Kong and grandmother of Donkey Kong, makes her first appearance. She runs an educational facility called "Kong Kollege", where she gives guidance to the player. Swanky Kong runs a game show quiz where the player may complete quizzes and earn extra lives. Funky Kong offers an aeroplane that allows the players to switch between already completed worlds. Additionally, the player can meet a large Kremling called Klubba, at Klubba's Kiosk, who demands fifteen Kremkoins from the characters if they want to travel to the Lost World and complete a secret level.

== Plot ==
Some time after Donkey Kong Country, Donkey Kong is relaxing on the beach, until he is ambushed by the Kremlings. He gets kidnapped and brought to Kaptain K. Rool, who demands the Banana Hoard he unsuccessfully tried to steal for a ransom from the Kongs. Diddy Kong and his girlfriend Dixie resolve to go to the Kremling's home island, Crocodile Isle, to rescue Donkey Kong. They travel through Crocodile Isle and are helped on their way by an assortment of animals to defeat Kaptain K. Rool. Diddy and Dixie eventually battle and defeat K. Rool, releasing Donkey Kong in the process. K. Rool manages to escape, and shortly after, Diddy and Dixie confront him in the Lost World, a secret area powered by a geyser at the heart of Crocodile Isle. They once again defeat K. Rool, who is hurled into the geyser, causing it to clog up and explode. The explosion causes all of Crocodile Isle to sink, as the Kongs watch K. Rool escape on a small sailboat.

== Development and release ==
Development of Diddy's Kong Quest began shortly after the release of Donkey Kong Country, but before its commercial success; the employees of Rare desired to present new concepts. Rare founder Tim Stamper served as director, whereas his colleague Brendan Gunn, who had worked on the original, returned to design. In response to complaints from veteran gamers, Donkey Kong Country 2 was designed to be more challenging than its predecessor. Several working titles were considered, including DK Rescue!, Diddy's Day Out, Diddy's Wild Country, and Diddy's Wild Frontier. Diddy Kong's Quest was decided on, but was slightly altered into Diddy's Kong Quest to create a play on the word "conquest". The game was announced at E3 1995. A Virtual Boy port was in development at one time but never released.

Like its predecessor, Diddy's Kong Quest uses Silicon Graphics (SGI) and Advanced Computer Modelling (ACM) rendering technology, in which pre-rendered images are modelled as 3D objects and then transformed into 2D sprites and background layers. The game's pirate-themed narrative and level design was influenced by designer Gregg Mayles's fascination with the Golden Age of Piracy. The team attempted to maintain the sense of speed and requirement of timing from the previous game. To avoid reproducing the same game entirely, Mayles altered the gameplay to be less linear and more encouraging of exploration, while respecting the basics of fluidity and speed.

In order to surprise players, the team decided to cast Diddy Kong as the main character as opposed to Donkey Kong. Mayles said that he dared to do without the iconic character of the series because his team's youth (Mayles himself was 23 during development) allowed them to disregard risks. The team preserved the gameplay mechanic of controlling two characters, which led into the creation of Dixie Kong. While Donkey and Diddy Kong controlled similarly, the team decided to establish a character with different abilities to force the player to change between characters regularly. To achieve this difference, the team gave Dixie the ability to hover and descend gradually. Dixie was modeled and animated by Steve Mayles. According to Gregg, the choice to introduce a female character was decided before the creation of her ponytail, and neither the hovering mechanism nor the intention to increase female representation in video games were an influence in the matter. The ponytail was initially given to create a trailing visual effect when Dixie runs, and Gregg decided to put the ponytail to use upon seeing this effect in action. The concept of Dixie descending by using her ponytail as a helicopter blade was then created. Due to the time-consuming nature of the modeling process, Diddy's model was used as the base for Dixie; the ponytail was then added, the clothes were changed, and his features were made more feminine. Nearly fifty names were considered for Dixie, including Didene, Dee, Daisy, Dandi, Dolly, Dizzie, Danni, Dippy and Ducky. The team initially opted for Diddiane before finally deciding on Dixie. Shigeru Miyamoto participated in the creation of the game's characters, as he had for the previous game. Miyamoto offered different motifs to adorn Dixie's beret with, including a banana, a heart and a logo, namely one inspired by that of the musical group ABBA. Rare incorporated the idea for a logo and placed a small version of the company's own on Dixie's beret in early promotional art. The creation of Dixie came at the expense of Donkey Kong's fiancée Candy Kong, who was removed from the game's cast due to Nintendo's concerns over her sexually provocative nature. The design choice to have Diddy and Dixie transform into the friendly animals that were initially mounted in the previous game was made out of concerns over sprite size; additionally, Gregg noted that having the two player characters clinging onto a parrot would significantly reduce its maneuverability.

Donkey Kong Country 2 was released worldwide in late 1995. In Australia, Nintendo released the Donkey Kong Country 2 Pirate Pak, a limited edition bundle of the game and SNES console.

=== Audio ===
"Stickerbush Symphony"
A 30-second excerpt from "Stickerbush Symphony", the music that plays in Donkey Kong Country 2's bramble levels. The song has received acclaim.

The soundtrack of Diddy's Kong Quest was composed by David Wise and was released in the United States as The Original Donkey Kong Country 2 Soundtrack. The soundtrack maintains similarity to its predecessor with its prominent percussion and eclectic genres ranging between big band, disco and hip-hop. The melodies and rhythms are largely comical in tone, but occasionally melancholic. Certain themes are reminiscent of compositions by Vangelis and Phil Collins. Wise cited Koji Kondo's music for the Mario and Zelda games, Geoff and Tim Follin's music for Plok!, and synthesizer-based film soundtracks released in the 1980s as influences in creating the music for the Donkey Kong Country series. The orchestral sound of Donkey Kong Country 2 was influenced by the works of Russian classical composers such as Prokofiev, Tchaikovsky, and Mussorgsky, which was done to fit with the game's darker theme. As with its predecessor, the music was produced for the SNES's SPC700 chip for the game to sound similar to the Korg Wavestation synthesizer.

The game's soundtrack was the focus of an OverClocked ReMix collaboration, Serious Monkey Business. The final track, "Donkey Kong Rescued", was remixed by David Wise himself, featuring Grant Kirkhope on electric guitar and Robin Beanland on trumpet.

== Reception ==
Reception

Aggregate scores
Aggregator	Score
GameRankings	90% (SNES); 81% (Wii)
Metacritic	80/100 (GBA)

Review scores
Publication	Score
AllGame	4.5/5
Computer and Video Games	94%
Eurogamer	8/10 (Wii)
Famitsu	8/10, 9/10, 8/10, 7/10
Game Informer	9.75/10
GameSpot	8/10 (Wii); 8.3/10 (GBA)
IGN	8.8/10
Nintendojo	9.9/10
Cubed3	8/10

Awards
Publication	Award
IGN	Editors' Choice Award
GamePro	Best SNES Game of 1995
Video Software Dealers Association	Video Game of the Year

Upon release, retailers struggled to meet the demand. Diddy's Kong Quest sold a combined 4.37 million copies in the United States and Japan on the SNES; the total number of copies sold in Japan at 2.21 million, and 2.16 million in the United States. It was the second best-selling game of 1995, after Yoshi's Island, and the sixth best-selling game on the SNES.

The game received critical acclaim, winning various Game of the Year Awards. The SNES version holds an aggregate score of 92% at GameRankings, whereas the Virtual Console re-release and the Game Boy Advance version both hold a score of 80% at GameRankings and Metacritic, respectively.

The graphics and gameplay were the most praised aspects of the game. Scary Larry of GamePro hailed the game as being longer, more graphically impressive, and more fun than the original Donkey Kong Country, and having some of the most cleverly illustrated levels ever seen on a home system. He gave it a perfect 5/5 in all four categories (graphics, sound, control, and FunFactor), but said that some levels are too difficult for younger players. Aaron Kosydar of AllGame thought that Diddy's Kong Quest's graphics were superior to that of its predecessor. Dan Whitehead of Eurogamer said that the graphics of the game were similar to the first Donkey Kong Country installment, although he praised them both as "impressive". However, Whitehead expressed concern over the lack of ambition from the sequel, stating that the gameplay uses the defense of "if it ain't broke, don't fix it". Reviewing the SNES version, Frank Provo of GameSpot heralded the graphics as "more detailed" although admitting that it appeared stylistically similar to the first game. In a separate review regarding the Game Boy Advance version, Provo praised the graphics as richer and "livelier" than those of the original. In a retrospective review, Mark Birnbaum of IGN stated that whilst its predecessor "boasted some of the most beautiful graphics" on the SNES at the time, Diddy's Kong Quest offered a superior experience due to its detail, smooth animation and varying colour palette.

Jeff Pearson of Nintendojo stated that Rare improved the graphics for Diddy's Kong Quest, and that the character animations appeared "much smoother and more cartoon like" in contrast to the computer-generated feel of the original. Pearson also heralded the background designs as reaching "newer heights" of quality. A reviewer of Cubed3 heralded the visuals as "unbelievable" for a 16-bit game. A reviewer of Jeux Video stated that the game "pushed the boundaries" of the console and that every detail was "devilishly handsome", and also praised the handling of the gameplay as being "pushed to a climax". In 2018, Complex ranked the game 17th on their "The Best Super Nintendo Games of All Time".

The music also received widespread praise. The track "Stickerbush Symphony" in particular has received critical acclaim, with Rolling Stone describing it as "a dreamy, forlorn, new-age ballad unlike anything we typically heard in console mascot games." Writing for Kotaku, Ethan Gach called the track "melancholic and reflective" while still "up-tempo enough to be a bop," and said that when combined with its accompanying level, it was "one of the most transcendent platforming moments in the genre." Writing for Clash, musician Skott called the song "good music to cook to. Or drive to," and "one of my favourite moods." Brett Elston of GamesRadar also praised the theme, saying its "mood is right in between somber and inspirational, as if it's calling us to action but we're too caught up in thought to comply." Taking it a step further, Luke Winkie, writing for Vice, said the track was "one of the best songs ever written." He believed that it had "charisma, an otherworldly mystique, a gorgeous, misty aesthetic, and some of the best midi-sax of all time."

=== Sequels and re-releases ===
A sequel, Donkey Kong Country 3: Dixie Kong's Double Trouble!, was released for the SNES in 1996 to positive reviews. In the game, Dixie Kong and Kiddy Kong must find both Donkey and Diddy Kong, who have disappeared while exploring the Northern Kremisphere, which has been invaded by the Kremlings. It was further followed by a succession of more related Donkey Kong video games, such as Donkey Kong 64 in 1999.

Despite Microsoft buying out Rare and essentially dissolving the company's second-party relations with Nintendo, they developed a remake of Diddy's Kong Quest, which was released for the Game Boy Advance in November 2004. While the graphical quality of the remake is downgraded due to the console's limited display of contrast, it includes a more detailed introduction to the plot as well as exclusive multiplayer minigames.

The original version was released for the Wii's Virtual Console in May 2007. It was made available for the Wii U and New Nintendo 3DS Virtual Console in 2015 and 2016, respectively. It was later made available on the Nintendo Switch via the Nintendo Classics service on 23 September 2020.

In the United States, the game's Game Boy Advance version sold 630,000 copies and earned $19 million (~$28.4 million in 2024) by August 2006. During the period between January 2000 and August 2006, it was the 41st highest-selling game launched for the Game Boy Advance, Nintendo DS or PlayStation Portable in that country.

=== Unofficial port ===
Super Donkey Kong 2 (Chinese name: Chaoji Da Jingang) is an unofficial port by publisher Ka Sheng of Donkey Kong Country 2 to Famicom, targeting users of Chinese "Famiclones". Game Developer praised the port's gameplay as "as solid as the original", but criticized its visuals and how it only included four of Donkey Kong Country 2's levels.
