= High-level design =

Initial stage in software design

High-level design (HLD) explains the architecture that would be used to develop a system. The architecture diagram provides an overview of an entire system, identifying the main components that would be developed for the product and their interfaces. The HLD can use non-technical to mildly technical terms which should be understandable to the administrators of the system. In contrast, low-level design further exposes the logical detailed design of each of these elements for use by engineers and programmers. HLD documentation should cover the planned implementation of both software and hardware.

== Purpose ==
- Preliminary design: In the preliminary stages of system development, the need is to size the project and to identify those parts which might be risky or time-consuming.
- Design overview: As the project proceeds, the need is to provide an overview of how the various sub-systems and components of the system fit together.

In both cases, the high-level design should be a complete view of the entire system, breaking it down into smaller parts that are more easily understood. To minimize the maintenance overhead as construction proceeds and the lower-level design is done, it is best that the high-level design is elaborated only to the degree needed to satisfy these needs.

== High-level design document ==
A high-level design document or HLDD adds the necessary details to the current project description to represent a suitable model for building. This document includes a high-level architecture diagram depicting the structure of the system, such as the hardware, database architecture, application architecture (layers), application flow (navigation), security architecture and technology architecture.

== Design overview ==
A high-level design provides an overview of a system, product, service, or process.

Such an overview helps support components be compatible with others.

The highest-level design should briefly describe all platforms, systems, products, services, and processes that it depends on, and include any important changes that need to be made to them.

In addition, there should be brief consideration of all significant commercial, legal, environmental, security, safety, and technical risks, along with any issues and assumptions.

The idea is to mention every work area briefly, clearly delegating the ownership of more detailed design activity whilst also encouraging effective collaboration between the various project teams.

Today, most high-level designs require contributions from a number of experts, representing many distinct professional disciplines.

Finally, every type of end-user should be identified in the high-level design and each contributing design should give due consideration to customer experience.

== See also ==
- Software development process
- Systems development life cycle
