= Black Orchid (Killer Instinct) =

Fictional character from Killer Instinct

- Killer Instinct character
- Orchid in her classic costume as seen in Killer Instinct (2013)
- First game: Killer Instinct (1994)
- Created by: Kevin Bayliss
- Designed by: Kevin Bayliss (KI); David Robert Donatucci (2013)
- Voiced by: Anzu Lawson (2013)
- Motion capture: Kevin Bayliss (KI-KI2); Louise Stamper (FMV, KI-KI2)

In-universe information
- Origin: United States
- Nationality: American
- Fighting style: Kobudō

Black Orchid (often shortened to "B. Orchid" or just "Orchid") is a player character in the Killer Instinct fighting game series created by Rare. Introduced in the original Killer Instinct in 1994, Orchid is featured as a playable character in all three installments. A mysterious spy and fighter, she is the female protagonist of the series, along with her younger brother Jago, and is one of the most popular Killer Instinct characters, though her sexualized portrayal in the games has also been subject to criticism.

== Conception and design ==
Created and designed for Rare artist Kevin Bayliss, who also redesigned Donkey Kong for the company and Nintendo, the character was originally a blonde woman called "Wanda" made for the fighting game Brutal Force. Wearing a red leotard, matching knee-high boots and headband, and using a long pole as a weapon, she was described in the design document simply as "a fearless acrobat". As the project changed to Killer Instinct, she was changed to a darker skinned woman with black hair. Standing 5 ft 7 in tall, her leotard covered more of her hips and was changed to green, her weapons changed to batons, and her background changed to a secret agent trying to infiltrate Ultratech, the game's antagonist. Her design was modified for the game's sequel, the leotard changed to expose more skin while her weapons were changed to tonfas. Though Black Orchid's race is not mentioned in the games, when asked by Electronic Gaming Monthly, Rare responded by stating she is "mulatto".

Rare employee Louise Stamper performed the motion capture for Orchid including the game's cutscenes, which Bayliss described as necessary so Orchid "walked like a lady". The motion capture suit itself was particularly difficult to use, and Bayliss himself performed the basic attack motions for all the characters, including Orchid. When doing her motion capture, he wore high heels and attempted to move "like a woman", though felt some of the resulting work as a bit "dodgy." He designed several moves for her, such as a finishing move where she turns her back to the screen and flashes her breasts at the opponent.

When creating Orchid's appearance for the 2013 reboot of the Killer Instinct franchise, the developers focused on a "rebel freedom fighter" motif for the character. To this end they focused on giving her attire a "military utilitarian" aesthetic, creating designs built around green armor, headgear and "a sense of danger". Art director David Robert Donatucci incorporated goggles and her original batons into her design, and as the team wanted to emphasize a panther aesthetic in her appearance. Her outfit was changed to a tank top and shorts, while grenades were added to give her a "rebellious dangerous side". While her clothing was meant to invoke the same imagery of her one-piece in the earlier games, the updated attire was meant to give a more "realistic" look of a spy fighting as a soldier of fortune. Director David Verfaillie stated that they wanted to focus less on her sex appeal, and "bring out the more fight aspect of her," whilst still retaining her "femineity."

== Appearances ==
As introduced in the 1994 fighting game Killer Instinct, Black Orchid is a secret agent infiltrating the corporation Ultratech through its martial arts tournament, to discover the truth behind disappearances related to the company. In the game's sequel Killer Instinct 2, defeating Ultratech's champion Eyedol caused the building and combatants to be sent two millennia into the past. Upon discovering that fellow character Jago is her brother, they work together to try and get back to present.

In the series reboot, Killer Instinct (2013), Orchid exhibits emotional instability from a young age due to inheriting the ability to summon the "Firecat" from her grandmother, who underwent a secret experiment during World War II. Fearing the government or Ultratech would use her as a tool, her Seal Team 6 father Jacob begins training her in combat, weapons usage, and summoning the Firecat. Two years later, they are found by the Special Warfare Department, a covert sect of the U.S.'s Homeland Security, and Jacob is forced to return to service in exchange for her freedom; he is assassinated by UltraTech a year later, prompting Orchid to join the SWD. A decade later, Orchid poses as an Ultratech scientist, learning that several SWD members are under its CEO ARIA's control. However, her commander does not believe her findings and dismisses her, but is murdered and Orchid framed for her death. Branded a terrorist, Orchid emigrates to the Carpathian Mountains, where she forms an anti-Ultratech spy ring known as the Disavowed. When fellow Disavowed member Eagle is reported dead, Orchid joins the Killer Instinct tournament to find out what happened, where she is almost killed by Jago before discovering he is her half brother. Orchid later teams up with T.J. Combo to destroy an Ultratech laboratory and broadcast evidence of their crimes to the world. She joins Maya's rebel force alongside T.J. and Jago, but they are trapped by Ultratech forces while ARIA's plan to summon Gargos is brought to fruition. However, ARIA halts the attack when it becomes clear Gargos is too strong to defeat alone, and Orchid and the other rebels are forced to join ARIA's alliance to stop him.

Outside of the game series, B. Orchid is featured in the 1996 Killer Instinct comics, where she is one of the main protagonists. In 2008, Rare created Vision Cards based on her and other Killer Instinct fighters for use in their video game Viva Piñata: Trouble in Paradise.

=== Gameplay ===
Black Orchid's fighting style emphasizes Kali (aka Eskrima) stick fighting in the original Killer Instinct and the 2013 game, and Okinawan tonfa in Killer Instinct 2. In all games, she uses a special move that resembles Chun-Li's Spinning Bird Kick. In Killer Instinct, one of her special moves has her morph into a "fire cat". In Killer Instinct 2, Orchid was given a complete gameplay overhaul, which included losing her tiger morph special move.

One of Orchid's original finishing moves has her giving a defeated enemy a heart attack by stripping and showing her breasts to them. It was featured only in the first game for the arcades and SNES; the Game Boy version features only the other one, where she turns an enemy into a frog and then stomps on it. Orchid turns her back to the player when performing the flashing move. A popular rumor stated that by positioning her in front of a mirror and performing this finishing move, the player could see her breasts reflected in the mirror. In response to this rumor, designer Ken Lobb pointed out that there is no mirror in any of Killer Instinct's stages.

While Orchid retains many of her classic moves in the 2013 title, she has also been given several new skills, such as the ability to use her Fire Cat as a projectile in Instinct Mode and as part of her Shadow moves. Her classic "retro" costume was included as unlockable content in a patch for the game. According to Prima Games, Orchid is a very balanced character who "lives and dies by the 50/50 mix-up". While Orchid "seems lacking compared to the other characters" in that "her special moves are mostly unsafe and she doesn't have that one abusive tactic that most of the other characters seem to possess", she has the fastest movement speed and her Instinct mode is one of the best in the game.

== Critical reception ==
Lucas Sullivan at GamesRadar claimed "For some old-school gamers, B. Orchid stands above Chun-Li as the iconic First Lady of fighting games." Sullivan examined her appearance in the 2013 Killer Instinct game, stating "Orchid's attire this time around actually matches her profession: secret agent, looking to expose UltraTech as the evil megacorporation that it is." In a review of the aforementioned 2013 game by Polygon, Arthur Gies stated "It can be a little hard to handle some of the more blatant stereotypes and overt sexualization of Killer Instinct's currently available roster of characters," highlighting Orchid and Sadira as examples. Gies attributes Orchid's sexualized pre-fight cutscene as a reason for this. Rob Bricken at Topless Robot included her as one of the ten "most ridiculously stereotyped fighting game characters," who praised her design, but also felt that she "[may be] the fighting-game world's most blatantly objectified female character."

Pedro Vázquez-Miraz, author of the study Review Of A Recent Article By Díez-gutiérrez (2014) And Qualitative Review Of The Video Games Analyzed In Díez-gutiérrez Et Al. (2004), described her as "hypersexualized", while reasoning "she is dressed with tight and provocative clothing, representing the stereotype of the femme-fatale." David Surman, author of Gaming, Uncanny Realism & Technical Demonstration, mentioned the game Killer Instinct "set a precedent for the promotion of games using still images of highly rendered computer-generated representations of the games player-characters. Debates around the realism and function of hyperreal game characters were yoked to this new marketing strategy," while citing Orchid as an example, due to her "large breasts and oriental 'mystique' made her the first of a succession of clichéd fantasy images to occupy this new gaming image culture." Surman also considers Lara Croft of the Tomb Raider series to be Orchid's "[successor to] this phenomenon." Game designer Celia Pearce, writing for Playing Dress-Up: Costumes, roleplay and imagination, listed Orchid as one of the four examples of female characters who "reveals a male fantasy about watching women in battle, rather than a female fantasy of empowerment."
