= Killer Instinct (1994 video game) =

1994 video game

- Arcade flyer
- Developer: Rare
- Publishers: Midway (Arcade); Nintendo (SNES/GB) Microsoft Studios (Xbox One)
- Designers: Chris Tilston; Mark Betteridge; Kevin Bayliss; Ken Lobb
- Programmers: Mark Betteridge; Steve Patrick (SNES); Robert Harrison (GB)
- Composers: Robin Beanland; Graeme Norgate
- Series: Killer Instinct
- Platforms: Arcade; Super Nintendo Entertainment System; Game Boy; Xbox One
- Release: Arcade; NA: October 28, 1994; SNES; NA: August 30, 1995; EU: September 21, 1995; AU: 1995; Game Boy; NA: November 1995; UK: December 14, 1995; Xbox One; November 22, 2013
- Genre: Fighting
- Modes: Single-player, multiplayer

Killer Instinct is a 1994 fighting game developed by Rare and published by Nintendo for consoles. It was originally released for arcades by publisher Midway in October 1994, and ported to both the Super Nintendo Entertainment System and the Game Boy the following year. The game's plot involves an all-powerful corporation organizing a fighting tournament. The story was adapted in a limited comic book series published under the short-lived Acclaim Comics imprint.

According to Ken Lobb, during his time at Namco Hometek, the groundwork for Killer Instinct started as a Namco's fighting game project in the early planning stages, titled Melee (which itself later became WeaponLord). Aspects of Killer Instinct's core gameplay were influenced from SNK fighting games, namely both the World Heroes and the Fatal Fury series, particularly the characters Kim Dragon and Kim Kaphwan.

Killer Instinct featured more detailed graphics and more diverse characters than any other games of its genre as well as some gameplay elements unique to fighting games of the time. Instead of fighting enemies in best-of-three-rounds bouts, each player has two life bars. The player that depletes the other player's life bars first wins the match. The game also introduced "auto-doubles", a feature which allows players to press a certain sequence of buttons to make characters automatically perform combos on opponents. Also featured in the game are "combo breakers", special defensive moves that can interrupt combos.

A critical and commercial success, Killer Instinct was followed by a sequel, the 1996 arcade game Killer Instinct 2, later ported to the Nintendo 64 as Killer Instinct Gold. After Microsoft acquired the franchise alongside developer Rare, a new 2013 game rebooting the franchise was released, serving as a launch title for the Xbox One. An emulated version of the original game is included with the 2013 game, under the title Killer Instinct Classic. The SNES version of the game was re-released on the Nintendo Classics service on February 21, 2024. Retrospective lists by various publications included it among the best fighting games of all time.

== Gameplay ==
Killer Instinct used advanced pre-rendered computer-generated imagery for its characters and backgrounds.

Killer Instinct plays like many other fighting games, in which the player controls a character to beat an opponent in a one-on-one encounter. The game borrows the attack set of Street Fighter and is also inspired by the finishing moves from Mortal Kombat. There are also several features that distinguish it from other franchises:

- A double health bar: Each player begins a bout with two bars of health. Victories are decided not by the best-two-out-of-three format common to other fighting games, but rather by the first player to exhaust both of their opponent's bars. In addition, players do not recover any health after draining the bar once.
- Automatic combos: Many combos are automated, after an initial button press sequence.
- Finishing moves: Bearing resemblance to (but being less graphic than) Mortal Kombat's Fatalities, each character has at least two moves known as No Mercy (Danger Move in later revisions) to finish the opponent. Another finisher is the Humiliation, that forces the opponent to dance.
- Ultra Combo: Another finisher, it operates like an Ultimate Combo, though this one allows the character to deliver a long string of hits as the combo finisher instead, usually surpassing 20 hits, and can sometimes reach upwards of 80 hits.
- Combo Breaker: The player who is being caught in a combo may escape it by performing a breaker move. A combo can be broken at either the auto-double or linker stage. After a character performs a combo breaker, the leading edge of their health bar will flash white, enabling advanced versions of some special moves that require a different command.

== Plot ==
Ultratech is a very powerful megacorporation which organizes a tournament called Killer Instinct. Along with regular participants, experimental creatures created by Ultratech also fight in the tournament so their strength can be tested. Ultratech also discovers a technology to make bridges between dimensions, and releases a two-headed satyr-like monster called Eyedol from his dimensional prison in Limbo.

== Characters ==
In addition to the boss Eyedol, the game offers a roster of 10 playable characters: Black Orchid, an agent working to stop Ultratech; Chief Thunder, a Native American chief sent to look for his brother; Cinder, an escaped convict who—due to a failed chemical test—garners a body composed of flame; Fulgore, a cyborg created by Ultratech to stop Jago; Glacius, an alien abducted by Ultratech; Jago], a Tibetan warrior monk guided by the Tiger Spirit; Riptor, a Velociraptor cloned by Ultratech; Sabrewulf, a man afflicted by lycanthropy; Spinal, the skeleton of an undead warrior; and T.J. Combo, a heavyweight champion boxer stripped of his title after he was discovered to be cheating with enhanced arms instead of natural ones. The Game Boy version omits Cinder and Riptor.

According to GamePro in 2010, Killer Instinct is "remembered for its colorful cast of combatants [including] a velociraptor, a sword-wielding skeleton, a creature made out of ice, and a host of other memorable characters". In 2012, Topless Robot wrote that it features "one of the most amazing and varied cast of characters ever to grace a fighting game".

== Development ==
The concept of Killer Instinct dates back to early 1993, when game designer Ken Lobb sketched his concept during his time at Namco, dubbing it "Melee". He sent his pitch to Namco, but it disapproved of the concept and instead made WeaponLord in its place. Lobb took the concept with him to Nintendo of America, where he became head developer. He flew to England and joined Rare, which was planning to rival the success of Mortal Kombat. Rare founders Tim and Chris Stamper approved of his pitch. In early 1994, Nintendo signed a licensing agreement with WMS Industries, Midway's parent company, which enabled Midway to develop and market games using the early arcade-based version of the Ultra 64 platform (later to become a home console and then be renamed to Nintendo 64) and formed a joint venture company called Williams/Nintendo to market Nintendo-exclusive home conversions of these games. Killer Instinct was announced as the first of these games. The announcement came at a time when Nintendo was still known for its stance against violent video games. To avert speculation that Killer Instinct would not be as violent as the title suggests, Nintendo's director of marketing George Harrison stated that "Williams would not have entered into this deal if they thought their hands would be tied. We won't restrict them in any way". He added that Nintendo believed that an industry-standard ratings system, which was expected to be in place by the time the home version was released, would make their stance against violent games no longer necessary.

The music was composed by Graeme Norgate and Robin Beanland, their first works for Rare. Beanland and Norgate would later go on to compose the music of GoldenEye 007 (1997). Initially released in 1994, Killer Instinct's arcade-based Ultra 64 hardware is different than the home console version which would be renamed to Nintendo 64 in 1996. The Ultra 64 arcade is a proprietary hardware platform co-developed by Rare and Midway, and created by Chris Stamper and Pete Cox. This hardware uses a 64-bit MIPS CPU and the Nintendo 64 file format for data structure, but not the Nintendo 64 memory media or graphics technology. The game's attract mode advertises plans to be "available for your home in 1995 only on Nintendo Ultra 64". The game was slated to be part of the North American launch lineup for the system. However, the Nintendo 64's release was delayed to December 1996 and the game was converted to the Super Nintendo Entertainment System and the Game Boy for 1995 release.

Killer Instinct is the first arcade game to use an internal hard disk drive in addition to the game's ROMs. This allows it to store massive amounts of data thereby giving it the ability to have more detailed graphics than other games of this genre. Running on a proprietary MIPS based hardware system, the game uses pre-rendered sprites and backgrounds, created with Silicon Graphics computers. The backgrounds are stored as a "movie" which adjusts frames based on the players' movements. Killer Instinct's R4600 processor is clocked at 100 MHz. Unlike most arcade games of the time, Killer Instinct does not display which version number of the game is being played.

In the SNES port, many of the features found in the arcade version were altered, downgraded, or removed to fit the standard 16-bit format. The graphic detail was vastly reduced, and the character sprites are smaller. The stages with a 3D panning camera were simplified into a 2D panning view using parallax scrolling for the background and a raster effect for the ground or arena, thus simulating a pseudo-3D effect. Zooming and scaling were removed. Some of the stages were redesigned. The full-motion videos that show the characters after a victory were mostly replaced by still images. Voice samples and sound effects were shortened or removed, and the music's quality is lower. Most of the characters' special moves and danger moves were retained, but some of the special graphical effects were removed. Some other modes were added, including a training mode and a tournament mode (used for multi-player purposes).

According to Peter Main, Nintendo's vice president of marketing at the time, the game had a marketing budget of $20 million.

== Release ==
The Europe, Australia, Canada, and US releases of the SNES game have black cartridge casing, instead of the standard grey shell. Nintendo made a large-scale advertising campaign.

A Game Boy port was also made, but cuts were necessary due to the system's limitations. As a result, neither Cinder nor Riptor are featured, and the moves were severely altered due to the more limited controls of the portable. Unlike the original, the Game Boy version received poorer reviews. The game's support for Super Game Boy adds some coloring, and a two player versus match by inserting a second controller.

Killer Cuts, an arranged soundtrack CD featuring original music from Killer Instinct, was released as a pack-in for the SNES release of the game, included with the first 100,000 copies sold in the US and the first 20,000 copies sold in Canada. The soundtrack was digitally re-released as part of a double-album set with the Killer Instinct: Season One soundtrack on October 14, 2014.

A digital port of the game's arcade version, titled Killer Instinct Classic, is available as part of the "Season One Ultra Edition" of Killer Instinct for the Xbox One. This port was developed by Code Mystics and published by Microsoft Studios, and includes a number of additional features, such as a new training mode, unlockable character sprite galleries and cutscenes, several visual filters, and the ability to play the game in both its original 1.4 revision and its later 1.5D revision. An update in late December 2014 added online multiplayer functionality. The SNES version was re-released on the Nintendo Classics service on February 21, 2024, marking the series' first appearance on a Nintendo home console since Microsoft acquired Rare.

== Appearances in media ==
An arcade cabinet of the game can be spotted in the 2002 Dark comedy Comic Book Villains.

== Reception ==
Reception

Review scores
Publication	Score
AllGame	4.5/5 (ARC); 4.5/5 (SNES); 3/5 (GB)
Computer and Video Games	93%
Electronic Gaming Monthly	7/10, 8.5/10, 7.5/10, 8/10 (SNES)
GameFan	281/300
Next Generation	4/5 (ARC); 3/5 (SNES)
Official Nintendo Magazine	91/100 (GB)
Total!	95/100
VideoGames & Computer Entertainment	8/10
Entertainment Weekly	A

Award
Publication	Award
AMOA Awards	Most Innovative New Technology (nomination)

=== Arcade ===
Killer Instinct was a commercial hit. In the United States, RePlay reported it to be one of the most-popular arcade games in January 1995. By May 1995, the arcade game had received about 500 million plays. It went on to be one of America's top five highest-grossing dedicated arcade games of 1995. As of 1996, the game sold 17,000 arcade units.

Killer Instinct gained critical acclaim. An early 1995 article on the fighting game industry in Electronic Gaming Monthly stated that "for now, the undisputed king at the arcades is Killer Instinct". Next Generation reviewed the arcade version of the game and wrote that "it's not the breakthrough title we're all waiting for — and sooner a new genre has to explode. But for the moment at least, Nintendo's plans for Ultra 64 seem to be progressing smoothly". Entertainment Weekly gave the arcade version of the game an A+ rating.

=== Super NES ===
The SNES version of the game was also met with positive reviews upon its release and was commercially successful, selling 3.2 million units, with more than 150,000 copies sold in the US on its release day alone and more than one million copies sold by November 23, 1995.

The game's use of 3D-rendered models attracted acclaim. VideoGames reviewer Tyrone Rodriguez gave the game a score of 8 (Great), preferring it over Mortal Kombat 3 (the other editors' additional scores being 8–6–6). Entertainment Weekly gave the SNES version of the game an A and praised the quality of the port. Also, the game was also praised for its combo system, soundtrack and controls. GamePro criticized that the SNES version suffers from a lower frame rate than the arcade version and is also missing some of its best sounds and graphical effects, and complained that the combo system makes it too easy for experienced players to defeat newcomers with a single chain of hits. They concluded that "this version of Killer isn't flawless, but it is surprisingly addictive and fun to play". The four reviewers of Electronic Gaming Monthly were divided, with Andrew Baran commenting that "while it's a nice attempt on the Super NES, it wasn't the same" as the arcade version, whereas the other three declared it "a superb translation" which has lower quality graphics and sound than the arcade version but retains its content, playability, and overall feel. Computer and Video Games gave the game a review score of 93%, adding: "Rare weren't lying when they said the home version would play better than the coin-op: no-one realised they were talking about the SNES!" Next Generation reviewed the Super NES version of the game: "Nintendo and Rare have managed one very impressive trick: getting the 16-bit Super NES to display 512 colors at once, twice the usual number, which gives the graphics an extra gloss".

The four reviewers of Electronic Gaming Monthly panned the Game Boy version, unanimously concluding it to be "an arcade translation that should never have been attempted on the Game Boy". They particularly complained of the difficulty in executing moves using only two buttons, the pixelated graphics, and the poor sound. GamePro, in contrast, declared it to be second only to the Game Boy version of Street Fighter II among portable fighting games, arguing that the two-button control is "a little awkward but still masterable" and that the graphics are less than outstanding only when unfairly compared to the SNES version.

=== Retrospective ===
Retrospectively, Killer Instinct was ranked as the 148th best game made on any Nintendo system by Nintendo Power in 2006, as well as the 95th on a similar list by Official Nintendo Magazine in 2009. In platform-specific retro lists, it was also ranked as the 19th and 38th best SNES game of all time by ScrewAttack and GamesRadar respectively, and as the 13th best arcade game of the 1990s by Complex.

Killer Instinct was included on several lists of top fighting games of all time, including by ScrewAttack in 2008 (ranked fifth best), GamePro that same year (ranked 18th best), and UGO in 2010 (ranked tenth best). In 2004, GamesTM called it possibly "the best combo-heavy fighter ever". In 2009, Virgin Media ranked it as the eighth top fighting game of all time, stating that it was "most famous for having the longest combos in the business". In 2007, it was voted the sixth top 2D fighting game of all time by CraveOnline users, and ranked the sixth best 2D fighting game of all time by Complex in 2013. IGN listed the game at #82nd on their "Top 100 SNES Games of All Time". In 2018, Complex rated Killer Instinct 53rd in their "The Best Super Nintendo Games of All Time." In 1996, GamesMaster ranked Killer Instinct 94th on its "Top 100 Games of All Time." In 1995, Flux magazine rated 45th in its Top 100 Video Games. They lauded the game, writing: "Graphically stunning, combo-riffic fighter. At the moment, it rules the arcade."

== Sequels ==
A sequel titled Killer Instinct 2 was released in 1996. Like the first game, it was ported to a home console, this time to the Nintendo 64 as Killer Instinct Gold.

A new Killer Instinct, published by Microsoft and developed by Double Helix Games and Iron Galaxy Studios with input from Rare, was released as a launch title for the Xbox One in 2013. Certain releases of the game include the Killer Instinct Classic port of the original arcade game and its sequel.
