= Killer Instinct Gold =

1996 video game

- North American box art
- Developer: Rare
- Publisher: Nintendo
- Producers: Chris Tilston; Mark Betteridge; Kevin Bayliss
- Designers: Chris Tilston; Mark Betteridge; Kevin Bayliss
- Programmer: Chris Tilston
- Artist: Kevin Bayliss
- Composer: Robin Beanland
- Series: Killer Instinct
- Platform: Nintendo 64
- Release: NA: November 25, 1996; AU: May 9, 1997; UK: July 4, 1997
- Genre: Fighting
- Modes: Single-player, multiplayer

Killer Instinct Gold is a 1996 fighting game developed by Rare and published by Nintendo for the Nintendo 64. It is based on the arcade game Killer Instinct 2. Players control characters who fight on a 2D plane set against a 3D background. Players press buttons to punch and kick their opponent in chains of successive hits, known as combos. Large combo successions lead to stronger attacks and brutal, stylistic finisher moves underscored by an announcer. Characters—including a gargoyle, a ninja, and a femme fatale—fight in settings such as a jungle and a spaceship. Killer Instinct Gold includes the arcade release's characters, combos, and 3D, pre-rendered environments, but excludes its full-motion video sequences and some voice-overs due to restrictions of the cartridge media format. The Gold release adds a training mode, camera views, and improved audiovisuals.

Rare was a prominent second-party developer for Nintendo in the 1990s, and their Killer Instinct series was produced as an exclusive partnership in response to the popularity of Mortal Kombat. Following the success of the 1995 Killer Instinct port for the Super Nintendo Entertainment System, Rare began a sequel for the same platform but transitioned development to its successor, the Nintendo 64, upon its unveiling. Gold was scheduled as a launch title for the new console but was delayed until its North American release in November 1996. It was released in other regions in May 1997. Gold was later included in Rare's 2015 Xbox One retrospective compilation, Rare Replay, and was re-released on the Nintendo Classics service in 2025.

Reviewers preferred the Nintendo 64 port over the arcade release, and appreciated its audiovisual enhancements, but felt that its graphical upgrades and memorization-based combo gameplay were insufficient when compared to fighting games like Tekken 2 and Virtua Fighter 2. Critics recommended Gold primarily for fans of the series and genre, but IGN reported that even fans were upset by changes in the combo system and the absence of several well-liked characters. Gold ultimately did not replicate the success of its Super NES predecessor, and the series remained dormant through its 2002 acquisition by Microsoft until its 2013 reboot.

== Gameplay ==
Fights take place on a 2D plane set against a 3D background. The green bars and large number indicate character health and the time limit, respectively.

Killer Instinct Gold is a port of the arcade fighting game Killer Instinct 2. Like other entries in the Killer Instinct series, two characters controlled by humans or artificial intelligence fight in one-on-one matches to deplete their opponent's health meter. While the characters move and attack on a 2D plane, the background is depicted in pre-rendered 3D and gives the appearance of depth. Players fight with a six-button setup: three punch buttons and three kick buttons, similar to the controls in Street Fighter II. Players can chain together a series of hits into "combos" for increased damage, with some special combos requiring specific, memorized sequences of button presses. Characters on the receiving end of a combo can interrupt the sequence with a "combo breaker" move. An announcer (Chris Sutherland) narrates major game moments with phrases like, "Awesome combo!" At the end of the opponent's depleted health bar, stylistic finisher moves, or "Fatalities" can be executed. Although the finishing moves in the Killer Instinct series share certain similarities to that of Mortal Kombat's Fatalities including depictions of blood and the killing of defeated opponents, they are generally less graphic in nature. Finishing moves involving explicit dismemberment or decapitation are absent from the series.

Gold features arcade, team, and tournament gameplay modes. The game's new "practice mode" lets players rehearse their skills and follow tutorials. In the new knockout tournament mode, players cycle through a preselected team of characters when their current character is eliminated. Gold features the same characters, combos, and environments available in the arcade Killer Instinct 2. Players can unlock new character appearances, gameplay difficulty levels, and an additional playable character. Gold and Killer Instinct 2's shared roster contains eleven characters in total: four new additions and seven returning from the previous title. (Note: Not all characters from the original reprised their roles.) Characters include a gargoyle, a ninja, and a femme fatale. Fights are set in spaceship, jungle, and castle settings, among others, and some backgrounds are interactive. Gold features new camera functions that automatically zoom to better frame the fight. The release also includes enhancements to the 3D backgrounds and an upgraded soundtrack, but excludes the full-motion video sequences and some voice-overs from the arcade release due to the Nintendo 64's cartridge media data storage restrictions. While Gold's backgrounds are fluidly animated in 60 frames per second, its character animations have fewer frames than its arcade equivalent.

== Development ==
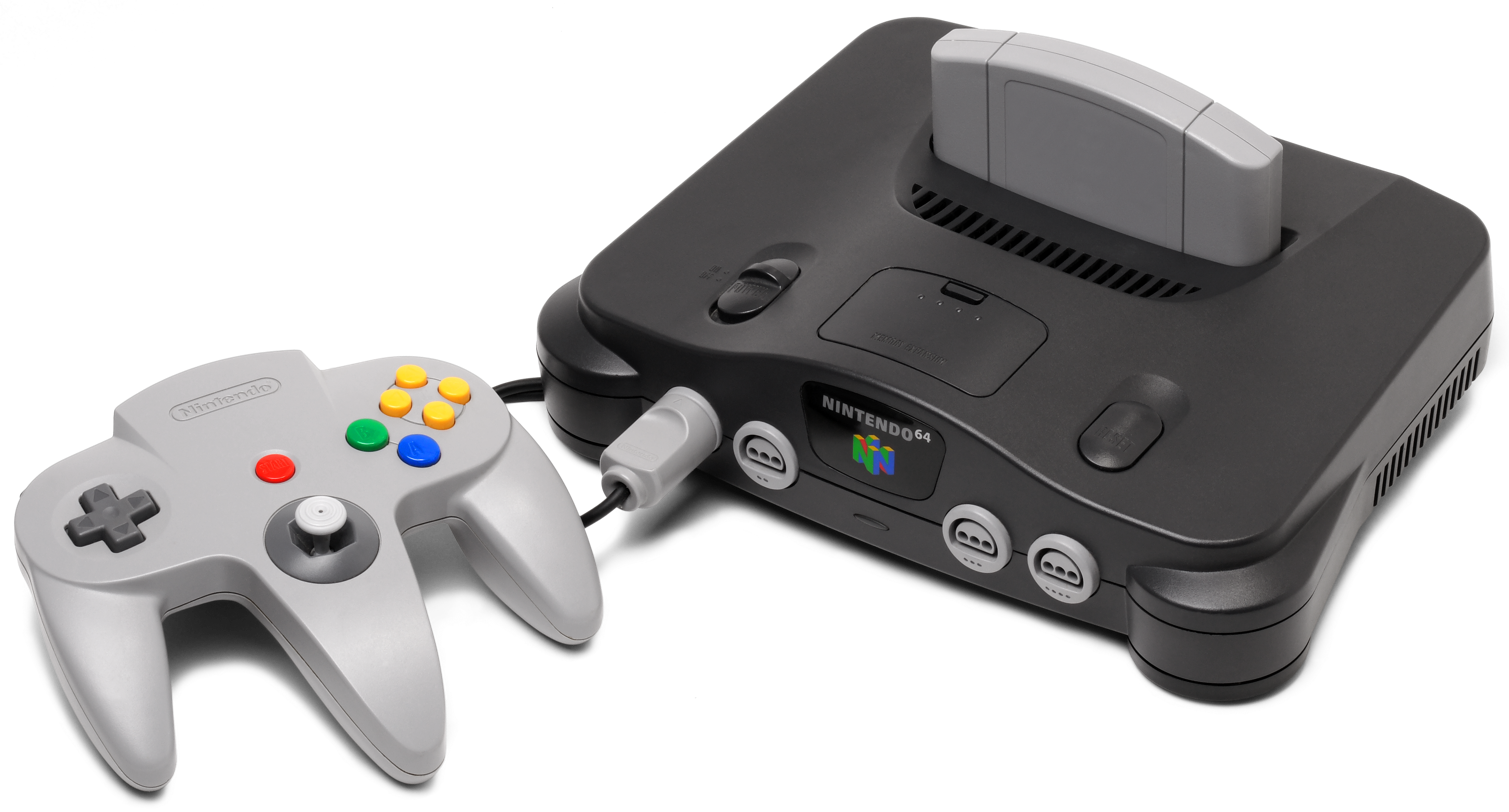
Killer Instinct Gold was planned as a launch title for the Nintendo 64 console.

Killer Instinct Gold was developed by Rare during a time when the British company was becoming a prominent second-party developer and ally for Nintendo, the game's publisher. Rare modeled its Killer Instinct series on the Mortal Kombat fighting game series. As a departure from fighting game staples such as Street Fighter, both Killer Instinct and Mortal Kombat championed an aggressively fast pace of gameplay and placed less emphasis on patience and mastery. The Killer Instinct series began as an arcade game (1994) and became known as "Nintendo's version of Mortal Kombat" upon its release on the company's Super Nintendo Entertainment System (1995) and Game Boy (1995). The video game industry expected a sequel after the Super NES version's wide success, with over three million copies sold. Following market demand, Rare began development on a sequel for the arcade. They had a Super NES version in development, but transitioned to the newer Nintendo 64 after the console's announcement. The Killer Instinct development team split itself between the arcade version and the Nintendo 64 release that would become Killer Instinct Gold. The latter began work as soon as Rare received its Nintendo 64 development kit.

The seven-person development team started work on the sequel with the ideas that did not fit into the original. They also incorporated feedback from Killer Instinct players. Killer Instinct 2's art, design, and programming changed continuously throughout development up until its release. Kevin Bayliss designed the characters and Chris Tilston developed the game engine with feedback from Nintendo's Ken Lobb. Rare used compression technology to fit the arcade version onto the smaller Nintendo 64 cartridge. While Killer Instinct was planned to showcase the Nintendo 64's power, the console was more limited than Rare's arcade setup, and Rare had to optimize the arcade version to run on the console. The arcade version used an animation to give the illusion of the camera panning horizontally, but the console version used static image files with less detail. Both the arcade and console versions use the same game engine and character roster.

The game was originally scheduled to be one of the Nintendo 64's initial two launch titles, but missed its release window. Gold released in North America on November 25, 1996, and in other countries on May 9, 1997. Its soundtrack received a compact disc release, which was rare for Western video games in the 1990s. Rare, under contract, ultimately finished its Super NES port of Killer Instinct 2, but Nintendo chose not to release it.

== Reception ==
Reception

Review scores
Publication	Score
AllGame	2.5/5
Computer and Video Games	3/5
Electronic Gaming Monthly	8.5/10, 6/10, 7/10, 6/10
Game Informer	8.5/10
GameSpot	7.4/10
IGN	6.5/10
N64 Magazine	62%
Next Generation	2/5
Daily Radar	✗ Miss

In 1996, reviewers compared Gold favorably to Killer Instinct 2, but thought that its graphics were not sufficiently upgraded. In particular, IGN felt that the Killer Instinct 2 graphics appeared dated in Gold and gave it a "cheesy 80s feel". Compared with the arcade release, IGN and CVG noticed fewer animation frames. IGN preferred Gold's crisp music but would have liked more characters and distinctions from the arcade version. GameSpot named Gold the best entry in the series at the time, but other reviewers only recommended Gold for fans of the series and genre and those most desperate for a Nintendo 64 fighting game. AllGame described Killer Instinct Gold as best for players who want "Mortal Kombat on speed" with a "hyperactive Barry White" announcer.

Within the fighting game genre, GameSpot considered Gold to be better than the other Nintendo 64 fighting game, Mortal Kombat Trilogy, but GamePro readers rated Gold below Tekken 2, also released that year. Next Generation and N64 Magazine agreed that Tekken 2 and Virtua Fighter 2 had outclassed Killer Instinct Gold. N64 Magazine concluded that even in the Nintendo 64's then-meager catalog of titles, Killer Instinct Gold did not distinguish itself, and thus had a lifespan of "weeks rather than months". Killer Instinct Gold waned from a celebrated announcement to a quiet European release.

Reviewers highly praised the game's sound and environment backdrops, but noted blurriness in its character animations. IGN appreciated its stereo sound, special effects, and camera work. The characters appeared blurry, CVG wrote, because of "fuzzy anti-aliasing" when the camera zoomed in. Apart from this blur, GameSpot considered the graphics "near perfect". The graphics similarly impressed Game Informer but, as one reviewer commented, Gold had few other positive features. In contrast, GamePro praised the "lively" character animations over the "mildly annoying" backgrounds.

While GamePro gave the game perfect ratings in controls and fun, Next Generation considered the controls almost as awkward as they were on the Super NES and ultimately wrote that the game was "not much fun". Many reviewers criticized how Gold's combo-based gameplay diminished the importance of skill. This shallow emphasis on "archaic" combo sequence memorization, said IGN, prevented creative improvisation. CVG wrote that Gold had little "flow": every match was focused on huge combos rather than small, strategic moves. Thus players were forced to train before they could effectively produce combos long enough to win matches. Multiple reviewers praised the game's training mode, which CVG also liked in its Super NES predecessor.

Killer Instinct Gold was the fifth best-selling video game of the 1996 Christmas shopping season according to TRST data.

== Legacy ==
After the 1996 Killer Instinct Gold did not sell as well as the Super NES version of the original, the series went dormant. IGN reported in 2010 that Killer Instinct Gold had upset series fans by changing the combo move sets and omitting "fan favorite" characters from the original. The website added that Rare knew that between all its franchises, Killer Instinct had the most fan interest in a new series entry. Microsoft purchased Rare in 2002, ending the acquisition's prominent alliance with Nintendo. Microsoft and Rare revived the series for the Xbox One platform in 2013. In 2014, GamesRadar retrospectively ranked Gold the 35th best game on the Nintendo 64 console.

Killer Instinct Gold was later emulated for the Xbox One in Rare's 2015 compilation, Rare Replay. Nintendo Life wrote that Gold's graphics had not aged well. The New York Daily News reported that Killer Instinct Gold, while "underrated" in its time, had withered into an outdated frustration as the anthology's biggest letdown. Destructoid singled out Gold as the collection's worst title, as a "barebones" Killer Instinct 2. Twenty years after the original release, Retro Gamer wrote that while Killer Instinct was popular in arcades, it had been outdone by Tekken 2 and Virtua Fighter 2 by 1996, and ultimately proved mediocre in comparison. The game was added to Nintendo Switch Online's Nintendo Classics service on May 16, 2025.

== Notes and references ==
Notes
