= Killer Instinct (2013 video game) =

2013 video game

- Xbox One cover art
- Developers: Double Helix Games (season 1); Iron Galaxy (seasons 2–3)
- Publisher: Microsoft Studios
- Directors: Ken Lobb; Adam Isgreen; Michael Donges
- Producer: Michael Willette
- Designers: David Verfaillie; Adam Heart; James Goddard
- Artists: David Donatucci; David Hall
- Composers: Mick Gordon (Note: Mick Gordon composed music for seasons 1 and 2.); Atlas Plug (Note: Atlas Plug and Celldweller composed music for season 3.); Celldweller
- Series: Killer Instinct
- Platforms: Xbox One; Windows; Xbox Series X/S
- Release: November 22, 2013: Xbox One Season 1; WW: November 22, 2013 Retail; NA: September 23, 2014; AU: October 9, 2014; EU: October 10, 2014 Season 2; WW: October 15, 2014 Season 3; WW: March 29, 2016 Definitive Edition; WW: September 20, 2016 Windows; WW: March 29, 2016 Xbox Series X/S; WW: November 28, 2023
- Genre: Fighting
- Modes: Single-player, multiplayer

Killer Instinct is a 2013 fighting game developed by Double Helix Games and Iron Galaxy and published by Microsoft Studios for the Xbox One. It was released as a free-to-play launch game for the console. It is the third installment and reboot of Rare's Killer Instinct series, as well as the first game in the series with no involvement from Nintendo. It received positive reviews for its mechanics and engine, but was criticized for its initial lack of content. A second season of downloadable content was released between 2014 and 2015. A third season, along with a port of the game for Windows 10, was released in 2016.

== Gameplay ==
The gameplay in Killer Instinct retains its traditional combo-based mechanics. The basic elements of combos are Openers, special attacks that start combos; Auto-Doubles, button presses following special attacks that create automatic hit sequences; Linkers, required to join several auto-doubles together; Enders, a sequence which finalizes the combo with increased damage; and Manuals, attacks chains entered outside of the traditional combo structure. Like in previous titles, players can finish their opponent using an Ultra Combo, an automatic sequence of attacks that can only be used to end a match. Season Two later added Stage Ultras, environmental finishing moves that can be triggered on specific stages. The game also features the return of Combo Breakers, attacks that can interrupt an opponent's combo when executed properly, as well as the new addition of Counter Breakers, which can cancel out an opponent's Combo Breaker while leaving the character vulnerable if improperly performed. Players who fail their Combo Breaker attempt or are attacked with a Counter Breaker enter a Lockout state, preventing another breaker from being attempted for three or four seconds respectively or until the combo ends. The Season Two update added the ability to use Combo Breakers and Counter Breakers even while airborne, as well as an "Aerial Recapture" option that allows certain characters to attack opponents in the air and pull them down to the ground to continue their combos. A two-segmented meter enables the use of "Shadow" moves that have upgraded hit properties and can cause more damage and combo hits, though certain characters' meters function differently. All characters can use a Shadow Counter technique while blocking to instantly cancel into a shadow attack.

Another new feature to the Killer Instinct gameplay is the addition of "Instinct Mode". By filling up a secondary bar beneath the character's lifebar, each character can trigger a unique enhancement for a limited period, such as Glacius covering himself in ice armor for better damage resistance, or Thunder's dash becoming invincible and moving farther. The enhancements are built around complementing the character's playstyle traits. Instinct Mode can be used to perform an instantaneous cancel during a combo and also reset the "knockdown value", a meter that appears during a combo that determines how close the combo is to being automatically ended by the game. Instinct Mode can also be used to stop an Ultra Combo in order to chain it to other moves and even into another Ultra for an even more stylish finish than a simple Ultra Combo can provide. An update in February 2017 brought the return of the series' "Ultimate" attacks, cinematic finishing moves for certain characters that can be used in place of an Ultra Combo.

Killer Instinct features an in-depth "Dojo" tutorial mode that not only introduces new players to Killer Instinct's systems, but also the basics of fighting game gameplay up through the intermediate and higher levels. A training mode is also included, which features a recordable CPU dummy, in-game frame data, as well as viewable hit-boxes.

The game's online multiplayer features a monthly tier-based ranked league. Four tiers are available, named Bronze, Silver, Gold and Killer. After first reaching the landing page, a player plays 10 qualifying matches to determine their initial tier placement on the ladder system. Afterwards, players only play against other players of the same tier until they rank up. 'Killer vs. Killer' matches feature a best '2-out-of-3' match setup. After each month, the Killer tier is reset and the top 32 Killer players at the end of the month are rewarded PRO Status, which immortalizes them in that month's leaderboards, in addition to unlocking special 'Player Card PRO' stars. The game's online netcode, developed with assistance from the creator of GGPO, is based on GGPO-style rollback functionality.

Killer Instinct also features the "Shadow Lab", a mode that studies how a player plays the game and then uses that information to create a 'Shadow' fighter, an AI for any character which is specifically based on that player's playstyle and techniques for that specific character, complete with that player's gameplay mannerisms and flaws. Players can create Shadows to play against other players online, even when the player is not present. Shadows attempt to adapt to fights the way their owner would. Shadows for a player's specific character grow stronger the more that player plays.

An additional single player mode, "Shadow Lords", was added to the game via a free update in September 2016. Serving as the story mode to Season Three, Shadow Lords requires players to assemble a team of three playable characters and choose between a series of procedurally-generated scenarios and battles against Gargos's mimic fighters, similar to a roguelike. Winning these battles will grant the player additional rewards, including items that provide temporary stat boosts when used, Guardians that provide new abilities when equipped such as parrying and armor, and exclusive character skins. Defeating certain opponents will also allow players to remove abilities and effects from Gargos, making him easier to defeat in the mode's final battle. Rewards are carried over between playthroughs of Shadow Lords, and additional content was added to the mode via several updates following its launch. An accompanying multiplayer mode allows players to use their items and guardians earned in Shadow Lords during online player battles.

The game features the ability to unlock and use retro Killer Instinct music in the game's training mode, as well as character accessories and classic costumes for use in place of characters' standard appearances. Chris Sutherland, the announcer from the first two Killer Instinct titles, is featured as an optional announcer available for use, while original Killer Instinct art director Kevin Bayliss designed a set of eight costumes for the game's second season. The game uses Kinect's facial recognition software to save players' personalized game settings.

Killer Instinct runs at 90 FPS (frames per second) while rendering at 60 FPS in order to make both offline local and online play more fluid. Killer Instinct's input lag is limited to 81 milliseconds (compared to 122 ms for Street Fighter V for PlayStation 4, 89 ms for Guilty Gear Xrd -SIGN- for PS4, and 105 ms and 107 ms for the Xbox One and PS4 versions of Mortal Kombat X, respectively).

== Plot and characters ==
The game is a reboot of the series' fiction, though several elements of the prior games' plots, such as a previous Killer Instinct tournament and Jago and Orchid's knowledge that they are siblings, have been retained. Arcade Mode in Season One features story-based campaigns for each character, culminating in a final battle with Fulgore. Fulfilling certain conditions allows players to access a secret battle against Shadow Jago in its place. Season Two added "Rivals" Story Mode, an expanded campaign that continues after the events of Season One, with more story content and unique sequences of opponents for each character. Like Killer Instinct 2, the game features multiple endings in Season One based on the player's actions, with multiple cinematic sequences in both story modes. The game features 29 playable characters, including every playable character from the previous Killer Instinct titles, along with several new characters and a small number of guest characters from other franchises. Characters were released gradually over the course of several "seasons" of content, and were originally available for individual purchase or as part of season bundles. For the first two seasons, each character was given an accompanying stage, while only four stages were added in Season Three. Characters listed in bold are new to the series.

=== Season One ===
- Jago: Suffering a crisis of faith following the discovery that the Tiger Spirit guiding him was actually Gargos, Jago now seeks to purge himself of whatever remnants of Gargos remain within him.
- Sabrewulf: Still trying to regain his humanity, Sabrewulf has almost completely submitted to his feral side and torn out his cybernetic implants, restoring his arms through the use of dark arts and developing an addiction to the medicines and artifacts used in the process.
- Glacius: Glacius has landed on Earth to recover his alien technology before it can fall into the wrong hands, while also searching for the thief who stole his ship's power core after landing.
- Thunder: Having learned that his brother Eagle was killed in the first Killer Instinct tournament but not knowing how or why, Thunder seeks to locate Eagle's remains and finally receive closure.
- Sadira: Sadira and her assassins are ordered by ARIA to hunt and kill the former competitors of the Killer Instinct tournament. ARIA also tells her to "prepare the way" by taking Glacius's power core and using it to open a dimensional rift.
- Orchid: Having been disavowed by her agency, Orchid emigrates to Eastern Europe to establish a rebel group, and fully commits herself to exposing and eliminating UltraTech.
- Spinal: Resurrected by an artifact known as the Mask of the Ancients, Spinal seeks to find the mask so as to remove the curse causing his immortality and allow him to finally rest in peace.
- Fulgore: A new Fulgore prototype is constructed to protect UltraTech from its enemies, but it begins to develop self-awareness due to the residual memories of the human mind used in its construction.
- Shadow Jago: A sinister version of Jago under the possession of Omen, who later manifests as his own being and acts as Gargos's minion.

=== Season Two ===
- T.J. Combo: Having lost his cybernetic implants and been scorned by the public after they are exposed, T.J. seeks to get revenge on UltraTech and earn redemption.
- Maya: After UltraTech's attack on her hidden city wipes out her clan and releases Kan-Ra, Maya sets out to destroy him once and for all.
- Kan-Ra: Freed from imprisonment during the attack on the Night Guard's city, Kan-Ra now seeks to restore his power and control the world.
- Riptor: A new line of Stalker units augmented with cybernetics and led by Riptor is developed by Ultratech to operate in conditions not suitable for their Fulgore line.
- Omen: Now able to manifest on the mortal plane thanks to his time spent in Jago's body, Omen seeks to herald the return of his master Gargos, destroying all who would oppose them.
- Aganos: Given the task of finding and killing Kan-Ra thousands of years ago, Aganos continues to pursue him, hoping to one day fulfill his master's last request.
- Hisako: When UltraTech desecrates her grave, Hisako's spirit is reawakened, and she seeks vengeance on those who disturbed her rest.
- Cinder: When he is caught trying to steal Ultratech secrets, Ben Ferris is forced to serve ARIA, being transformed into the half-alien Cinder.
- ARIA: Deciding that humanity has become weak and vulnerable, ARIA decides to force human evolution by any means necessary.

=== Season Three ===
- Rash: A guest character from the Battletoads franchise. An anthropomorphic toad who can transform his body in order to do damage.
- Kim Wu: Chosen by her family's guardian dragon spirit, Kim Wu takes up her ceremonial nunchaku and trains to prepare for Gargos's invasion.
- Arbiter: A guest character from the Halo franchise. A proud warrior of the Sangheili race.
- Tusk: Granted immortality millennia ago, Tusk is tasked by the gods with stopping Gargos.
- Mira: Transformed into a vampire, Mira is ordered to retrieve an artifact that will aid in Gargos's return.
- Gargos: Trapped in another dimension for millennia, ARIA's machinations allow Gargos to finally reach Earth.
- General RAAM: A guest character from the Gears of War franchise. A military leader of the Locust horde.
- Eyedol: The only one to pose a threat to Gargos, then slain by Tusk after being corrupted from absorbing Gargos' astral energy, Eyedol is resurrected by Kan-Ra but proves too powerful to control.

=== Post-Season Three ===
- Kilgore: An Ultratech prototype abandoned in favor of the Fulgore line, Kilgore is reactivated to help fight against Gargos.
- Shin Hisako: Granted her father's guardian katana, Hisako's spirit is purged of her vengeance, freeing her from the bonds of her grave.
- Eagle: After years of imprisonment and experimentation, Eagle is finally freed from Ultratech's clutches.

== Development ==
For many years after Killer Instinct 2's 1996 release, rumors of a possible follow-up circulated. In 1997 Electronic Gaming Monthly reported that Rare were deep into development on a Killer Instinct 3 which would likely be released in 1998. Years after Microsoft's acquisition of Rare, several individuals from Rare expressed interest to revive Killer Instinct franchise, such as Ken Lobb, Microsoft Studios creative director and co-designer of the original Killer Instinct games; Rare studio manager Mark Betteridge, who wished to bring Killer Instinct to the Xbox Live Arcade; and Rare veteran Donnchadh Murphy.

Microsoft applied for renewal of the Killer Instinct trademark in September 2012. Rare veteran Lee Musgrave, who was the former head of art at Rare, spoke on the issues of making Killer Instinct for XBLA: "We came close to firing off a conversion of Killer Instinct a few times, but there were licensing obstacles to that, and it never really had enough perceived interest to push it forward". Three months after applying KI trademark, Microsoft's renewal for the Killer Instinct trademark was rejected by the United States Patent and Trademark Office due to the possibility of the game being confused with the unrelated TV series of the same name that lasted for one season in 2005. Microsoft had six months to respond to the ruling. The trademark dispute was settled when Microsoft and Fox reached an agreement in April the next year.

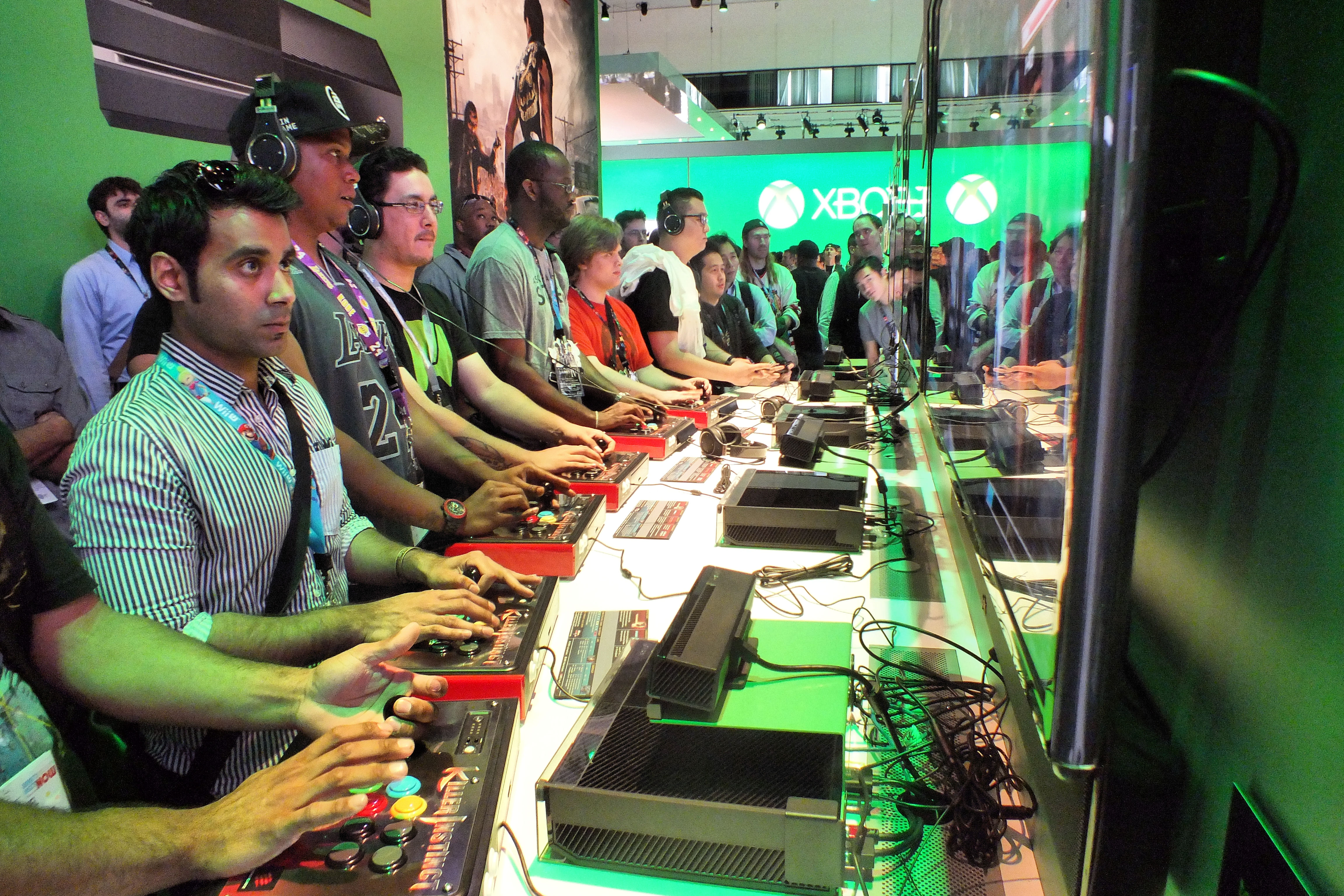
A showing of the game's demo version at the E3 2013

At the E3 2013, Microsoft and Double Helix Games announced Killer Instinct exclusive for the Xbox One. Rare was also involved in the development. A trailer showed the series' mainstays Jago, Sabrewulf and Glacius. Ken Lobb said more characters were to be revealed at then-upcoming events such as Evolution Championship Series 2013, during which Chief Thunder's return was teased. Two polls conducted by Double Helix asked fans what characters they would like to see return. The development team also expressed a desire to introduce brand new characters into the franchise, particularly female ones.

Development of the game involved individuals with histories in fighting games on both the developmental and competitive sides. They include former Capcom developer and WeaponLord co-creator James Goddard and former competitive player and tournament organizer Adam "Keits" Heart as combat designers, former Street Fighter developer and Weaponlord co-creator Dave Winstead as character designer, competitive Street Fighter player Campbell "Buktooth" Tran as a producer, and former Tekken community manager Rich "FilthieRich" Bantegui and tournament organizer Alex Jebailey as community managers.

A live demonstration of the title at E3 2013 between producer Torin Rettig and Xbox community manager Ashton Williams was poorly received by a number of bloggers, journalists and developers, including Jonathan Blow. The demonstration had the two competing against one another and exchanging banter in a manner that some viewers interpreted as scripted and alluding to assault. Williams later commented that the dialogue was unscripted and no ill intent was meant on the part of either individual. Nevertheless, Microsoft's Phil Spencer issued an official apology stating in part that at Microsoft "bullying and harassment of any kind is not condoned and is taken very seriously".

Following the announcement that Double Helix Games had been purchased by Amazon, Microsoft confirmed that support for Killer Instinct would continue, later putting Iron Galaxy Studios as the developer of its Season Two content. A port of the game for Windows 10 was unveiled at E3 2015; the PC version was developed in-house by Iron Galaxy and supports cross-play and cross-buy with the Xbox One version.

At Gamescom 2015, a third season was announced, which was released in March 2016 alongside the PC version; Rash from the Battletoads series was also announced as a playable character for Season Three, and was made available to existing Killer Instinct players or owners of the Rare Replay compilation for a brief test period prior to the season's launch. The second guest character, the Arbiter from Halo, was announced at the 2016 Halo Regional World Championships. The final guest character, Gears of War's General RAAM, was announced during Microsoft's E3 2016 press briefing and released following the presentation's conclusion. Mick Gordon, the composer for the first two seasons, did not return for Season Three, with Atlas Plug and Celldweller assuming the role in his stead.

The Definitive Edition version of the game was released via Steam in September 2017. This version of the game adds support for Windows 7, and players on Steam can also play users on both Xbox One and Windows 10 in Exhibition matches, Lobbies, and Shadow Lords multiplayer, expanding the number of Killer Instinct players to over 10 million.

At EVO 2023, in celebration of the game's 10th anniversary, Microsoft and Iron Galaxy announced the game would be receiving a new update, which would include new balance changes, improved online matchmaking, and native 4K resolution support on Xbox Series X/S. During an anniversary stream on November 22, it was confirmed that the Definitive Edition would be phased out in favor of a new Anniversary Edition release on November 28, with existing owners being upgraded to the new version for free. The free-to-play version was also added to Steam. On April 2, 2024, a final update to Anniversary Edition was released that added ranked cross-platform play, along with two new unlockable stages and three unlockable colors for each character, as well as giving all players access to the additional colors that were previously exclusive to the Ultimate Source figures.

== Release ==
Killer Instinct was released on November 22, 2013, as a free-to-play game that includes all available game modes but only one playable character, with the ability to purchase additional fighters individually. The sole playable character in the free version rotates on a regular basis. Season Two was released on October 15, 2014, and Season Three was made available for pre-order March 18, 2016, then released later that month on March 29.

Players who purchased a 12-month Xbox Live subscription during the launch of the Xbox One received access to Shadow Jago, a variation of Jago with the same moves but unique voice and visual effects. The character was later integrated as a secret boss, given unique moves and properties not accessible by the playable version. In May 2015, Microsoft began a fundraising campaign to raise money for supporting Killer Instinct tournaments, making Shadow Jago available for purchase for two weeks as an incentive. The fund ultimately raised $100,000 in three days; as a result of its success, Iron Galaxy confirmed that they would be updating Shadow Jago later in the year, giving him the moves used by his boss incarnation. The new version of Shadow Jago was released on December 4 and was made available for general purchase between December 18 and January 15, 2016, then permanently available on April 5.

While most characters could be purchased separately, Killer Instinct also offered season-based character bundles for a discounted price; these bundles unlocked each character from the season as they were completed, allowing players to access them two weeks before they were released to the general public. Each season offered a "Combo Breaker Pack", which included all eight characters for that season, as well as an "Ultra Edition", which included the same eight characters as well as their respective retro costumes and premium accessories. The character Omen was only available as part of the Season Two bundles and was not available for separate purchase, while Shadow Jago was not included as part of any bundle release. Each season's Ultra Edition bundle also included a unique bonus: Season One and Season Two include digital Xbox One ports of the arcade titles Killer Instinct and Killer Instinct 2 respectively, developed by Code Mystics, while Season Three offered additional colors for its eight new characters and a double XP booster. A "Supreme Edition" was released alongside Season Three, containing all the content featured in the three Ultra Editions, with the exception of Killer Instinct Classic and Killer Instinct 2 Classic for the PC release. Players who purchased the Season 3 Ultra Edition or the Supreme Edition within a limited window received 18,000 "KI Gold" currency for use in the in-game store.

A retail version of Killer Instinct was released on September 23, 2014. This physical release included all the content included in the Season One Combo Breaker Pack, as well as early access to Season Two fighter T.J. Combo. A second retail release, Killer Instinct: Definitive Edition was released on September 20, 2016, for Xbox One. This release included all the content and characters featured in the digital Supreme Edition bundle, along with additional behind-the-scenes content, a soundtrack disc, and early access to gold and silver character colors for Gargos. Following the release of Definitive Edition on Steam, all Definitive Edition owners received every downloadable skin pack and the Post-Season Three characters for free. The Definitive Edition was retired in favor of Killer Instinct: Anniversary Edition on November 28, 2023, which includes all of the content from Definitive Edition with the exception of the Classic releases and the separate Definitive Edition application. Existing Definitive Edition owners received Anniversary Edition as a free update, while the ability to purchase season bundles or individual fighters was also phased out. The free-to-play version of the game was also released on Steam simultaneously with Anniversary Edition.

An official arcade stick made by Mad Catz was released to coincide with the game's launch. Beginning in 2016, a series of collectible character figures was released by Ultimate Source, with each figure including a code to unlock an exclusive in-game color for their respective character; these colors were later made available to all players as part of Anniversary Edition. Dynamite Comics published a Killer Instinct comic book miniseries, written by Ian Edginton with art by Cam Adams. Set after the events of Season Three, the miniseries ran for six issues from September 2017 to April 2018. A trade paperback of all six issues was released on September 11, 2018.

== Soundtrack ==
The soundtracks for Seasons One and Two were composed by Mick Gordon, and Season Three by Celldweller and Atlas Plug, based on the originals by Graeme Norgate and Robin Beanland. A double-album set, containing the official Season One soundtrack and the Killer Cuts album, was released digitally on October 14, 2014. A second double-album set, including the Season Two soundtrack and the Killer Instinct Gold Cuts album, was released on August 4, 2015. The soundtrack to Season Three was later released on October 25, 2016. Singles for the themes of Killgore, Shin Hisako and Eagle were released on August 25, 2017. A digital compilation of all the soundtracks was released via Steam on September 27, 2017, alongside the game's release on the platform.

== Reception ==
Reception

Aggregate score
Aggregator	Score
Metacritic	XONE: 73/100; XONE (Season Two): 85/100; XONE (Season Three): 86/100; XONE (Definitive Edition): 86/100

Review scores
Publication	Score
Edge	7/10
Electronic Gaming Monthly	6.5/10
GamesRadar+	4/5
Giant Bomb	4/5
Hardcore Gamer	4/5
IGN	8.4/10
Joystiq	3/5
Official Xbox Magazine (US)	7.5/10

Season One received a mixed reception at launch, scoring a 73/100 approval rating from aggregate review site Metacritic. Lucas Sullivan of GamesRadar called the gameplay "accessible enough for a newcomer while still providing the depth that the hardcore scene craves", while Vince Ingenito for IGN enjoyed it more than the original titles, calling it "fluid, deep, and well informed by the mistakes of its predecessors". Jeff Gerstmann of Giant Bomb stated that the game is "still ridiculous, the announcer still screams his head off, and the combos are wild... but actually executing KI's combos is a good time, too, making this download-only fighting game an exciting turnaround for the series". Chris Carter for Destructoid did not take issue with the game's new pricing model, calling it "a far cry from an abusive free-to-play scheme" yet still criticized the initial content at launch as "bare-bones". Anthony Severino, reviewing for GameRevolution concluded that "if only there were more of it across more characters that had a story, Killer Instinct would be gold".

Season Two was more positively received, scoring 85/100 on Metacritic. Season Three was also similarly positively received with Patrick Hancock for Destructoid praising the new addition and overall, the development the game had made since its original release, stating that "Killer Instinct has slowly become one of the most competent fighters in the genre".

Orchid's theme ("Touch Me and I'll Break Your Face") won the Best Original Vocal Song – Pop at the 12th Game Audio Network Guild Awards.

During the 17th Annual D.I.C.E. Awards, the Academy of Interactive Arts & Sciences (AIAS) nominated Killer Instinct for "Fighting Game of the Year". Three years later, the AIAS also nominated Season 3 of Killer Instinct for "Fighting Game of the Year".
