= Kinect Sports Rivals =

2014 video game

- Developer: Rare
- Publisher: Microsoft Studios
- Producers: Adam Park, Joe Neate
- Composer: Robin Beanland
- Series: Kinect Sports
- Platform: Xbox One
- Release: NA/AU: 8 April 2014; EU: 11 April 2014
- Genre: Sports
- Modes: Single-player, multiplayer

Kinect Sports Rivals is a sports video game developed by Rare and published by Microsoft Studios for the Xbox One. It is the third and final game in the Kinect Sports series and utilizes the console's Kinect motion-sensing camera. The game was announced during Microsoft's E3 2013 press event and was released in April 2014.

== Gameplay ==
The game features sports such as bowling, jetski racing, rock climbing, soccer, target shooting, and tennis.

== Development ==
The staff size for Kinect Sports Rivals was 150. Originally intended as an Xbox One launch title, the game was delayed from November 2013 to April 2014. Ex-Rare designer Gavin Price commented on the development of the game in 2015: "During Rivals' development, Kinect kind of got dropped quite suddenly. I think in part it was because we missed the launch date - I don't think that did us any favours! But we managed to get a jetski demo out for Xbox One's launch, and we had our cloud-based Avatar creation system with the facial recognition as well."

== Reception ==
Reception

Aggregate score
Aggregator	Score
Metacritic	60/100

Review scores
Publication	Score
Destructoid	7/10
Eurogamer	6/10
Famitsu	28/40
Game Informer	6.5/10
GameRevolution	5/10
GameSpot	5/10
Hardcore Gamer	4/5
IGN	7.3/10
Joystiq	2/5
Official Xbox Magazine (US)	6/10
Polygon	6/10
Shacknews	4/10
The Telegraph	2.5/5
The Guardian	3/5
Digital Spy	3/5
National Post	6.5/10

The game received "mixed" reviews according to the review aggregation website Metacritic. In Japan, where the game was ported for release on 4 September 2014, Famitsu gave it a score of all four sevens for a total of 28 out of 40.

National Post gave the game 6.5 out of 10, saying, "Kinect Sports Rivals isn't quite the revolution in motion-controlled sports gaming that we might have hoped for." Digital Spy gave it three stars out of five, saying, "It's a package that rivals the very best party games for volume, so ultimately when the whistle blows and the action is go, there's plenty of fun to be had with Kinect Sports Rivals." Metro similarly gave it six out of ten, saying, "Kinect is still a solution in search of a problem, and while this is an impressive tech demo it's a largely uninteresting video game experience." Common Sense Media gave it three stars out of five, saying, "Unless you're a huge fan of Kinect Sports and [you] have some disposable income, leave this game for the bargain bins." Edge gave it five out of ten, saying, "Rivals' biggest problem is that its chances of success are inexorably bound to the performance of the device around which it is designed." EGMNow gave it four out of ten, saying, "Instead of making a case as to why you need a Kinect, Kinect Sports Rivals shows that the peripheral—and most games revolving around it—still have a long way to come."

The game entered the UK all-formats sales charts at #14 and a source later indicated to Eurogamer that Rare suffered a significant loss on the project.
