= Killer Instinct =

Series of fighting video games

- Series title card, c. 2013
- Genre: Fighting
- Developers: Rare (1994–1996); Double Helix Games (2013); Iron Galaxy (2014–2017, 2023–)
- Publishers: Midway Games (1994–1996, arcade); Nintendo (1995–1996, console); Xbox Game Studios (2013–)
- Creator: Rare
- Composers: Robin Beanland (1994–1996); Graeme Norgate (1994); Mick Gordon (2013–2015); Atlas Plug (2016–2017); Celldweller (2016–2017)
- Platforms: Arcade, SNES, Game Boy, Nintendo 64, Xbox One, Windows, Xbox Series X/S, Nintendo Switch
- First release: Killer Instinct; October 28, 1994
- Latest release: Killer Instinct; November 22, 2013

Killer Instinct is a series of fighting video games originally created by Rare and published by Midway, Nintendo, and later Xbox Game Studios. The original Killer Instinct was released for arcades in 1994; the game was then released for the Super NES and Game Boy in 1995. Its sequel, Killer Instinct 2, was released for arcades in 1996; the game was then released as Killer Instinct Gold for the Nintendo 64.

The series was rebooted with the release of Killer Instinct (2013) for the Xbox One.

== Games ==
=== Killer Instinct (1994) ===
Killer Instinct is an arcade fighting game developed by Rare and published by Midway. Initially released in arcades in 1994, the game advertised it would launch in 1995 for an intended "Nintendo Ultra 64" home console. The Ultra 64 eventually materialized as the Nintendo 64, but never received a version of the original Killer Instinct. Instead, the game received a high-profile launch on the SNES, released on October 27, 1994, which bundled a CD of remixed game tracks with a limited edition black-colored cartridge, as well as a release on the Game Boy handheld the following year. Both the SNES and Game Boy versions were published by Nintendo. A digital port, titled Killer Instinct Classic, was released as part of a bundle with its 2013 sequel's first season on Xbox One. The SNES version of Killer Instinct was re-released as a Nintendo Switch Online game on February 21, 2024.

Instead of using pixel art or digitised actresses, the characters of Killer Instinct were created through a process called pre-rendering.

=== Killer Instinct 2 and Killer Instinct Gold (1996) ===
A 1996 arcade-only game developed by Rare, licensed by Nintendo, and manufactured by Midway. It was the sequel to Killer Instinct. The game was also ported to the SNES, but never released. It was later ported to the Nintendo 64 console under the name Killer Instinct Gold, and the port was published by Nintendo. A digital port, titled Killer Instinct 2 Classic, was released as part of a bundle with its 2013 sequel's second season on Xbox One. Killer Instinct Gold was also included as part of the Rare Replay compilation release.

=== Killer Instinct (2013) ===
A reboot of the Killer Instinct series, developed by Double Helix Games under supervision of Ken Lobb, and the first game in a planned series to be published by Microsoft Studios, was released in November 2013 as a launch title for the Xbox One. Following the acquisition of Double Helix Games by Amazon, Iron Galaxy Studios took over the development of post-launch content. A Windows 10 version was released in March 2016 on the Windows Store, and via Steam in September 2017.

== Gameplay ==
Killer Instinct is a fighting game featuring one-on-one combat. The game borrows the attack set of Street Fighter and is also inspired by the finishing moves from Mortal Kombat.

There are also several features that distinguish it from other franchises:

- A double energy bar: instead of winning two rounds, each player has two bars of energy. If a character finishes with their opponent's first life bar, the fight stops and resumes like a round, but the winning character still keeps whatever amount of energy they had at that moment. The player who depletes their opponent's second life bar wins the bout.
- Automatic combos: rather than press the necessary buttons in order to deliver the individual attacks that form a combo, in Killer Instinct the combos are automated and can be enabled by inputting a determined button or special move (which causes the character to deliver a string of hits).
- Finishing moves: Present in the first and second games and bearing resemblance to Mortal Kombat's Fatalities, each character has at least two moves known as No Mercy (Danger Move in later revisions) in order to kill the opponent in a violent manner. One of these No Mercy moves can be executed at the end of a combo (which is labeled as an Ultimate combo), when the opponents life bar flashes red (when their second bar is going to be depleted), although it uses a different combination of movements. Unlike a Mortal Kombat Fatality, the No Mercy move does not involve gore and dismemberment. Another finisher is the Humiliation, that forces the opponent to dance (the dance style depends on the character), but this can only be used if the player has their first life bar. Finishing moves that kill the opponent can change the ending that the player receives upon winning the game if the opponent is significant to the player's story in Killer Instinct 2.
- Ultra Combo: Another finisher; it operates like an Ultimate combo, though this one allows the character to deliver a long string of hits as the combo finisher instead, usually surpassing 20 hits, and can sometimes reach upwards of 80+ hits. Ultra combos kill the opponent, which can change the ending that the player receives upon winning the game if the opponent is significant to the player's story and if the game implements multiple endings per character.
  - Stage Ultra: Similar to the ultra combo including the fact that it kills the victim, but is unique to the fighting stage and positioning of fighters. When performed correctly it can be as simple as knocking a player out of or off a building to sealing them away in a magical book.
- Combo Breaker: The player who is being caught in a combo may break out of it by performing a combo breaker move. The combo breaker is a designated special move of the player's character. A combo can be broken at either the auto-double or linker stage. To successfully break an auto-double, the player must use the breaker move at a strength lower than the auto-double itself (i.e. to break a Medium auto-double, the player must use a Quick breaker). The combo can also be broken at the linker stage. At this stage the player can use any strength of breaker, making long combos a risky affair. Also, after performing a combo breaker, a white starburst will appear at the tip of the breaker's health bar, enabling advanced versions of some special moves that require a different command.
  - In the 2013 Xbox One title, the breaking methods are more specific, where the break must be the same strength as the opponent's chosen attack, openers/enders cannot be broken (unless the combo is opener->ender). If successful, the player knocks away their opponent but does no damage. If the strength of the break or the timing of the break are not correct, the breaking player is locked out from attempting another break for 3 seconds.
- Knockdown Value: Introduced in the 2013 title, combo attacks deplete very little health as they are executed, instead building up a damage potential (indicated by a white haze over the health meter) that must be banked with a finisher attack. While a combo is executed, the knockdown value meter fills. If the combo is not "finished" when this meter is full, the combo immediately ends in a blowout attack and all potential damage begins to regenerate. Activating Instinct Mode or successfully performing a counter-breaker can reset this gauge back down to empty and string even longer combos.
- Instinct Mode: Introduced in the 2013 title, as a player takes damage, or performs combo breakers an instinct mode gauge fills up. When full, the player can activate it to earn a unique bonus onto themselves, such as Jago's Endokuken projectiles firing twice and gaining a life drain effect and Black Orchid being able to summon fire cats for attacks. If activated mid-combo, the knockdown value is reset in addition to any other bonus.
- Counter Breaker: Introduced in the 2013 title, this is akin to pre-empting the combo breaker. When an offensive player strings together a combo, they can mix in a counter-breaker feint at any time. If the opposing player responds with a combo breaker of any strength, they will be immediately be placed into a longer than normal lockout (4 seconds instead of 3) and the player's knockdown value will be reset, allowing an even longer uninterrupted combo. If the feint is not met with a combo breaker, the player is left vulnerable to attack.

== Characters ==
=== Introduced in Killer Instinct ===
==== Chief Thunder ====
Voiced by: Ken Lobb

Chief Thunder, a Native American chief armed with twin tomahawks, enters the tournament to find out what happened to his missing brother Eagle in the previous year's tournament.

In the series' reboot, Thunder—AKA hinmatoom—is the grandson of a chief and son of tribal police officers, living on a Nez Perce reservation in Idaho with his brother Eagle. As a teenager, Thunder goes on a vision quest and receives a vision from his spirit animal, a giant crow, telling him he would one day battle an evil monster and should begin training to use tomahawks. In their late 20s, Thunder and Eagle's parents are killed by Ultratech, though the circumstances are covered up. Trying to infiltrate Ultratech, Eagle joins the Disavowed and enters the first Killer Instinct tournament, and is later reported by Ultratech as having been killed in a match, though they refuse to return his body for burial. Grieving and enraged, Thunder attempts to break into an Ultratech plant and is imprisoned, but the plant is later burned to the ground, destroying any evidence regarding his parents' deaths and Eagle's disappearance, and Thunder is framed for arson. Going into hiding in New Mexico for a year, Thunder goes on another vision quest, this time receiving a vision of a metal eagle. Determined, Thunder dons his war paint and enters the second Killer Instinct tournament in the hopes of finding Eagle's remains and receiving closure. Upon discovering evidence that his brother may have been used in the construction of a Fulgore unit, he swears vengeance for the mutilation and begins eliminating Fulgores in a search for Eagle. He later frees Aganos from Ultratech's control, and the two form an alliance, working together to find both Eagle and Kan-Ra.

In the 2013 Killer Instinct, his fighting has been revised to be based more heavily around grappling than the other characters. His character design was also revamped to be more culturally sensitive towards Native Americans, with help from a Nez Perce tribesman. In December 2016, a new "Legend of Thunder" costume was released as part of a game update, designed in direct collaboration with members of the Nez Perce tribe with the intention of being as accurate to Nez Perce tradition as possible.

==== Cinder ====
Voiced by: Ray Chase (KI 2013)

Ben Ferris is a convicted criminal who was promised early parole in exchange for participating in Ultratech's chemical-weapons research. As a result of an accident during testing, his body is composed entirely of flame. Now going by the code name Cinder, he is promised a return to his original form if he is able to defeat Glacius in the tournament. However, Cinder ultimately fails to defeat Glacius and is killed.

Cinder returned as part of the second season of Killer Instinct for Xbox One, retconning his backstory. In this version, Ferris is a former military special operative-turned-career criminal, stealing information and secrets for corrupt corporations. When he receives an expensive contract from rival corporation Trilodyne to steal data regarding Ultratech's top-secret "Project Cinder", he infiltrates the organization, discovering the project to be of extraterrestrial origin. However, he is caught and exposed by ARIA, who reveals Trilodyne was a front for Ultratech and the assignment was a test of Ferris's abilities. Having spied on Ferris for years to see if he was a worthy candidate for Project Cinder, she offers him a chance to work for her. Knowing he may die if he rejected the offer, Ferris agrees, and ends up being the first test subject for Project Cinder. His DNA is spliced with that of Glacius, causing his body to be consumed by plasma energy, though a mask and suit designed by ARIA allows Cinder full control of his powers. Enjoying his new abilities, he now serves as ARIA's lieutenant, working alongside her to fulfill her plans. After eliminating Sadira on ARIA's orders, he is promoted to her second-in-command, and is seen at her side when Gargos's dimension is opened.

In the early development stages of Killer Instinct, Cinder went through multiple name changes, such as "Meltdown" and "Pyrotech".

==== Eyedol ====
Voiced by: Henry Sterchi & Isaac Marshall (KI), Zachary Quarles (KI 2013)

The final boss of the first Killer Instinct, Eyedol is a two-headed, one-eyed ancient mystical warlord who was trapped in a dimensional prison in the distant past. Ultratech releases him to be the final combatant in the tournament. In Killer Instinct 2 Eyedol was trapped in combat with Gargos, the final boss of that game. In Eyedol's ending, he is supposedly found by his mother (as a boy named "Billy") after going missing in a car crash as a child. However, Eyedol attacks her in a comical manner in a spoof of Blanka's original Street Fighter II ending.

Eyedol is the final character of Killer Instinct: Season Three. In the game's story, he was once a human warrior who was chosen by the Ichoreans to be one of the Watchmen of the Gods. Eyedol protected the Earth from an invasion by Gargos, taking some of his powers and sending him back to the Astral Plane. Eyedol was revered by the humans and crowned king of an empire, but the Astral energy corrupted him, mutating him into an ogre and causing him to destroy everything in his path, killing any heroes who tried to stop him. Eyedol was eventually lured by fellow watchman Tusk back to the Astral Plane, where he was imprisoned by the Ichoreans. During Gargos's takeover of the Astral Plane, Eyedol was inadvertently released and sought to challenge Gargos for control of the dimension, but Gargos tricked Eyedol into wearing himself out fighting smaller chimerae before engaging him directly, allowing him to overtake Eyedol and split his head in two. However, Eyedol survived as his soul was split into two separate entities. To prevent him from reviving, Gargos removed Eyedol's soul and splits his body into pieces, giving them to his most powerful followers to keep separated. In the present, Kan-Ra retrieves Eyedol's soul and asks the alliance to recover Eyedol's body parts from the Knights of Gargos. He uses them to revive Eyedol in the hopes he will aid the Alliance in defeating Gargos, but Eyedol is beyond the sorcerer's control and resumes his destructive rampage, hoping to draw Gargos out. After several battles, Eyedol is finally convinced to join the Alliance against their common foe.

In early SNES versions of the game (released only to stores), he was selectable; however, in the arcade and retail SNES versions, he is a secret character who can be accessed using a cheat code. He is the only character in the game with no special finishing moves (such as No Mercy moves, Ultra Combos, or Humiliations); however, he compensates with a limited ability to heal. In the reboot, only one of Eyedol's heads is active at any given time, with his moves and abilities changing based on which one is active; the Warrior head uses his weapon like a club, emphasizing close-range physical attacks, while the Mage head uses the weapon to generate lightning and spells, focusing on ranged attacks and battlefield control. The active head will change at random during battle, with players able to force a switch by punching themselves at the cost of some damage, while Instinct Mode will activate both heads at once.

==== Fulgore ====
Fulgore is a cyborg and the penultimate opponent in the single-player mode of the first Killer Instinct. Developed by Ultratech, Fulgore is the first in a planned series of state-of-the-art cyber soldiers. While designed to resemble a knight to help gain the people's trust, rumors say the human parts used in its construction originated from an organ harvesting operation based in Moscow. Before the Fulgore Mk.I model is even finished, the team of scientists developing it have already begun work on an upgraded model. As a final test of its power, the Fulgore prototype is entered into the Killer Instinct tournament; if successful, Fulgore would be placed into mass production. In the sequel, a new, enhanced Fulgore model is created after the first Fulgore was destroyed by Jago in the first tournament. His goal is to kill Jago, whom he considers his mortal rival. In the end, he is defeated by Jago and his sister Orchid.

A third Fulgore model appears in the reboot, acting as the final opponent of Season One's arcade mode. This Fulgore unit is developed to help defend Ultratech against its enemies, correcting the flaws of their prototype Kilgore units. However, Fulgore begins to develop self-awareness and defy its programming due to the residual memories of Eagle, whose mind was used as a blueprint for Fulgore's neural network.

Outside of the games, Fulgore appeared in the 1996 Killer Instinct comic series, marking the first time the connection between Eagle and Fulgore was explored in any Killer Instinct media. Fulgore also appears in the 2017 comics series as one of several generic drones utilized by Ultratech. Fulgore was also one of six Killer Instinct characters to make a cameo appearance in the video game Viva Piñata: Trouble in Paradise as a Piñata Vision Card. Additionally, a weapon named "Fulgore's Fist" can be unlocked by players in Banjo-Kazooie: Nuts & Bolts. GamesRadar+ described him as "easily the most iconic Killer Instinct creation".

==== Glacius ====
Voiced by: Kevin Bayliss (KI, KI2), Jean-Edouard Miclot (KI 2013)

Glacius is an alien who was captured by Ultratech and promised freedom if he wins the tournament. In the end, Glacius defeats Cinder and returns home. In Killer Instinct 2, a distant relative of Glacius from 2,000 years ago who shares his name heeds a distress call, coming to Earth to find his lost brethren and bring them home. Glacius uses three No Mercy moves: one where he becomes a gel-like mass and absorbs the opponent, similar to the Blob (arcade only), one in which he uses his finger as a syringe to inject the enemy with a substance turning them to ice, and one in which he becomes a pool of boiling water in which the enemy drowns.

The original Glacius returns in Killer Instinct for Xbox One, where he is portrayed as a galactic marshal for the Alliance of Worlds, hailing from the Ice Rings of Sokol. Following a distress signal to Earth, where intergalactic criminal Mer'ik Deem had crashed years before in the Roswell UFO incident, Glacius' ship is shot down by Ultratech and crashes in Patagonia, adopting the ice as his new exoskeleton. While undergoing metamorphosis, his power core is stolen by Sadira, and he becomes determined to catch her and prevent his technology from falling into the wrong hands. Lured into the Killer Instinct tournament, Glacius eventually catches up with Sadira, who uses his genetic code to activate the power core, creating a wormhole and escaping. Realizing the threat it poses, Glacius resolves to find the core's current holder and train to prepare himself should it be used to summon an extradimensional creature. He later infiltrates Ultratech and frees Eagle from his captivity, using his race's technology to augment him. However, this leaves him unable to return home and instead dedicates himself to destroying Ultratech.

==== Jago ====
Voiced by: Kevin Bayliss (KI, KI2), Mike Willette (KI 2013)

Jago is a Tibetan monk and a powerful warrior. Abandoned as a baby, he was found by the Monks of the Tiger, an order who worship an ancient deity known as the Tiger Spirit, and raised in their monastery as one of their pupils. Over the years, Jago matures into one of the Order's finest students until he is one day visited by the Tiger Spirit during meditation. The Tiger Spirit chooses him as its champion and grants him new power, ordering him to enter the first Killer Instinct tournament and destroy Ultratech. Though nearly overwhelmed by the Tiger Spirit's power, Jago follows orders and helps to bring down Ultratech, destroying Fulgore in the process. However, in Killer Instinct 2, Jago is betrayed by the Tiger Spirit, who reveals itself to have been the demon Gargos all along, having used Jago to gain entrance to the physical world. Jago seeks revenge for Gargos' manipulation and defeats both him and Fulgore, who was revived with the sole purpose of killing Jago. In the aftermath, Jago seemingly defeats and banishes Gargos and discovers that Orchid is his sister, the two having been separated when their parents were murdered shortly after Jago's birth. Jago also appears in the 1996 Killer Instinct and Killer Instinct Special comics, along with the 2017-2018 Killer Instinct miniseries from Dynamite Comics.

In the reboot, Jago is the son of Orchid's military father, Jacob, and a foreign aid worker in Pakistan with whom he had an affair. Shortly after Jago's birth, his mother disappears with him into the Himalayas, and he is later found abandoned by the Monks of the Tiger. The monks raise Jago from birth and train him in combat, but he isolates himself after killing a fellow warrior possessed by an evil spirit in self-defense. Meditating in a mountain cave, he is visited by the Tiger Spirit and infused with his power. The Spirit orders him to destroy Ultratech by participating in the Killer Instinct tournament, and Jago complies, though he worries when the Spirit becomes more bloodthirsty, nearly causing him to murder his long-lost sister Orchid. Following the tournament, Jago discovers the Spirit is actually Gargos. Jago experiences a crisis of faith and tries to exorcise Gargos's influence from within him by seeking out the strongest of opponents. This crisis of faith is symbolized through his new costume, which consists of various materials cannibalized from the now abandoned Tiger Shrine, including tiles (arm guards), bits of broken statues (knee pads), drapery, and ropes from a chandelier (leg bindings and harness). However, Jago succumbs to the corruption, allowing Omen to possess him and transforming him into Shadow Jago. Eventually, Jago fights back against his possession, and Omen is forced to abandon Jago's body, though his time spent in Jago's body gives him enough strength to manifest on the mortal plane and he escapes. Jago later joins Maya's rebel force alongside Orchid and T.J. Combo, planning to defeat both Ultratech and Gargos, but they are trapped by Ultratech forces at Maya's headquarters in the Andes while ARIA's plan to summon Gargos is brought to fruition. Ultimately, Jago and the others ally with ARIA in order to stop Gargos from conquering Earth.

An alternate version of the character called Shadow Jago also appears in the reboot. Designed an altered version of Jago who is under the possession of Omen, Gargos's herald, and later manifests as his own separate being and a minion of Gargos. Initially, Shadow Jago was only available as a playable character for those who purchased a 12-month Xbox Live membership during the launch of the Xbox One, controlling identically to Jago but with some visual and vocal differences. In Season One's story mode, he was included as a secret boss possessing both new moves and an Ultimate Combo, becoming the only character to receive one until a 2017 update. Following a successful fundraiser, the playable version was reworked and given a unique move set based on his boss incarnation. The updated version of Shadow Jago was released in December 2015, and the character became permanently available for purchase by all players in April 2016.

==== Riptor ====
Voiced by: Zachary Quarles (KI 2013)

Riptor is a genetically-engineered velociraptor-human hybrid created as a prototype by Ultratech; the tournament tests her abilities as a killing machine. However, she is ultimately defeated by T.J. Combo prior to KI2, but damages Combo's right eye during the confrontation. Riptor has three No Mercy moves: one in which she spits acid on the enemy, a second in which she stabs the foe with her tail, and a third in which she runs at the enemy, eating them.

A new, enhanced Riptor appears as part of the second season of Killer Instinct for Xbox One. Created by Ultratech's military division under ARIA's orders, Riptor is the leader of a pack of cybernetically-enhanced raptors known as Project Stalker, meant to serve as an alternative to the Fulgore line and Cinder project, being able to operate in conditions ill-suited for either. The Stalkers are all augmented using leftover Fulgore technology and human DNA, and bred as assassins to eliminate perceived threats to Ultratech. With initial tests resulting in feral, uncontrollable units, later Stalkers undergo a simulated upbringing through the mind of their creator, Ultratech scientist Dr. Erin Gupte, instilling a pack mentality and familial bonds. Gupte's mind becomes unstable as a result of the mind-sync, however, and she is eventually eaten by her own units. Years later, the Stalker units are ready to be sold to private buyers, but T.J. and Orchid break into a development facility, stealing classified information on Project Stalker and broadcasting it globally, damaging public perception of Ultratech. Under ARIA's orders, Riptor and the Stalkers assault Maya's rebel force, trapping them while ARIA enacts her plan before being called back to headquarters.

==== Sabrewulf ====
Voiced by: Jean-Edouard Miclot (KI 2013)

Count Von Sabrewulf is afflicted with lycanthropy and promised a cure by Ultratech if he wins the tournament. In the sequel, Sabrewulf was captured by Ultratech after being severely injured during the first tournament, and has been driven mad by experimentation. With cybernetic arms, he desperately seeks a cure for his lycanthropy. Sabrewulf fights in his inherited castle with biting and claw attacks and has the ability to howl and use his flaming bats (although sometimes they do not flame). Originally called "Cyberwulf", he was inspired by the antagonist of Rare's 1984 game Sabre Wulf.

In the reboot, Baron Konrad Von Sabrewulf discovers a secret laboratory hidden in the castle he inherited from his parents in Ravensburg, Germany, learning that the Sabrewulf clan was once part of the Night Guard. Prone to addiction, he cuts himself on a werewolf's claw among their trophies in a drunken stupor, inheriting its lycanthropic curse. Shapeshifting, he destroys most of the castle in a rage, inadvertently destroying the formula for a cure with it, and isolates himself. Attempting to remove the curse, he begins experimenting on himself, becoming more feral and developing an addiction to pain-relieving drugs. Luring him with the promise of a cure, Ultratech captures and experiments on him, giving him cybernetic arms and extending his metamorphoses to near permanence, but Sabrewulf breaks free of their control during an early Killer Instinct tournament and escapes, tearing out his mechanical implants and restoring his damaged body parts through dark magic. Briefly gaining control of his lycanthropy, he now seeks a more permanent solution to his curse.

==== Spinal ====
Voiced by: Chris Seavor (KI, KI2), David Robert Donatucci (KI 2013)

An animated skeleton, Spinal was reanimated by Ultratech through cell regeneration but destroyed by Chief Thunder in the first tournament; however, Gargos had a Spinal of his own in the past. Spinal fights for vengeance and his freedom. In the first Killer Instinct, Spinal is the third-last opponent in single-player mode; with a sword and shield, he can teleport and change himself into a grayscale version of his opponents during combos.

In Killer Instinct for Xbox One, when he was alive, Spinal was a bandit in ancient Babylon, hired by Kan-Ra to disrupt the King's rule. He is later captured and cursed by an artifact known as the Mask of the Ancients, forcing him to protect the King and obey his every command no matter how suicidal. Eventually, the King orders Spinal to burn himself alive as a final punishment, leaving only his skeleton behind. However, Spinal's will and the mask's magic allow his bones to reanimate, so the King has his remains sealed and orders the mask thrown into the sea. Over the centuries, Spinal gains control of his skeletal body and breaks free of his prison, scouring the bottom of the ocean for the mask, later taking up a pirate's life and sinking all the ships he encounters. He discovers the mask to be in Ultratech's possession, and ARIA offers it to him in exchange for his entry in the Killer Instinct tournament and service to Ultratech, to which he agrees. Spinal gains the mask following the tournament's conclusion, but finds its powers to have been stripped by Gargos. He now seeks to defeat the entity so that he might take its dark powers for his own.

Spinal has a quirk: to perform certain moves, he must gather energy—represented by tokens shaped like skulls under his life bar (SNES version) or skulls floating around him (arcade, Gold, and Xbox One versions)—by absorbing opponents' projectile-energy attacks (with his shield in absorbing position) or performing combo breakers. Despite requiring these tokens, his special moves are no stronger than normal special attacks. Spinal can store up to five skull tokens, overloading if he tries to absorb energy for the sixth time. On the sixth attempt he will not block the projectile, and it will cause normal damage and knockdown; he will then be left with one remaining skull.

==== T.J. Combo ====
Voiced by: Patrick Seitz (KI 2013)

A former five-time heavyweight boxing champion, Tyler-Johnson "T.J. Combo" Garrett was stripped of his title and expelled from the circuit when it was discovered that he had been cheating, having secretly had cybernetic enhancements implanted in his arms. Ultratech promises the disgraced boxer that he would be returned to his former glory if he wins the tournament. After his victory against Riptor in the first tournament, which also cost him his right eye, T.J. Combo was sent into the past and fights to return home.

In Killer Instinct for Xbox One, T.J. is born into poverty in Texas and trained to box by his ex-military father. After losing a fight as a teen, T.J. begins cheating to win, but is eventually found out and banned from the league. After dropping out of school and being ejected from the military, T.J. moves to Chicago to reinvent himself, taking a job at a boxing gym to pay for his own training. Ten years later, T.J. becomes the Heavyweight Champion, but falls victim to the superstar lifestyle and neglects his training, losing the title three years later. After his manager flees the country, leaving T.J. in debt, Ultratech offers to install illegal cybernetic augmentations in his arms; desperate to stay on top, T.J. accepts. As a result, T.J. reclaims the title, but realizes he has become a pawn of Ultratech. When ARIA demands he throw a fight against Fulgore during a live exhibition for their customers, T.J. defies her and wins the fight. As punishment, ARIA exposes his enhancements, causing his title to be stripped and T.J. to be banned from boxing for life. Disgraced, T.J. rips the implants from his body and uses his last remaining funds to buy the boxing gym, renaming it the Combo Gym and training young fighters. Later, T.J. is contacted by a member of the Disavowed, who reveals T.J.'s former manager was an Ultratech agent planted to force T.J. into bankruptcy so Ultratech could experiment on him. Seeking both vengeance and redemption, T.J. joins the Disavowed and teams up with Orchid to destroy a Stalker development facility, acquiring classified information on Ultratech's illegal experiments. The two break into the Pinnacle, with T.J. defeating the new Fulgore model protecting the facility, and barely escape as Orchid broadcasts their findings to the world, causing public perception of the company to plummet and Ultratech to go dark. Orchid allows T.J. to take credit for the exposure, and he is once again hailed by the public. He later appears as part of Maya's anti-Ultratech rebel force with Orchid and Jago, barely surviving the attack by ARIA's forces.

The character was based on John Parrish (who also performed the motion capture for T.J. Combo in the original Killer Instinct), known for playing Jax in the early Mortal Kombat games.

=== Introduced in Killer Instinct 2 ===
==== Gargos ====
Voiced by: Ken Lobb (KI2), Edward Bosco (KI 2013)

Gargos is a demon lord who has returned to the physical world. He was Eyedol's rival, resembling a huge gargoyle who is powerful and can breathe fire. After being locked in combat with Eyedol for thousands of years, Eyedol's summoning and subsequent defeat gives Gargos the chance to begin his conquest anew. Jago's back story in the second installment reveals him to be the "Tiger Spirit" that led Jago to the first Killer Instinct tournament and did appear in his ending in 1. Like Eyedol in the original game, Gargos may be accessed with a cheat code.

In Killer Instinct for Xbox One, Gargos is one of the Ikkorans, a race of demigods capable of bending reality and creating "living" beings through force of will, such as his herald Omen. Thousands of years prior, Gargos stages a takeover of the Astral Plane, slaughtering the Ichorean race that opposes him. The realm's native Guardians escape to other dimensions, but seal the Astral plane so that Gargos and his allies would never escape. In the chaos, the imprisoned Eyedol breaks free and challenges Gargos, but Gargos overpowers him, splitting him into many pieces to prevent his resurrection. In the present, Jago is lured by Gargos under the guise of the Tiger Spirit. Upon discovering the truth, he attempts to purge the remains of Gargos's influence from within him. At one point, he is possessed by Omen and turned into Shadow Jago to make him a potential host body for Gargos. However, Jago's will is too strong, and he forces Omen out, creating a new Shadow Jago in the process. Eventually, Kan-Ra is tricked by ARIA into opening a portal to Gargos's dimension, and ARIA defeats Omen, prompting Gargos's forces to emerge from the portal onto Earth. As his form is mortal outside of his own realm, his Mimics begin taking the forms of other fighters, battling ARIA's resistance force and spreading shadow energy from the Astral Plane on Earth, the accumulation of which increases Gargos's power.

==== Kim Wu ====
Voiced by: Abby Trott (KI 2013)

Kim Wu is a 17-year-old East Asian female ninja descended from the people who repelled Eyedol and Gargos. To protect her people, she tries to destroy Gargos. Kim Wu's No Mercy moves are setting her opponents on fire with a blazing shuriken and jumping on them. Kim Wu is also an enemy to Spinal, a soul resurrected by Ultratech.

In Killer Instinct for Xbox One, Kim Wu is a 21-year-old American college student majoring in fashion design. She is the youngest of three children born to a pair of Chinese and Korean immigrants, and was trained from the age of three in nunchaku and Jeet Kune Do by her uncle Philip Yong at the Dragon Academy, her mother's family dojo in Chinatown, San Francisco, before eventually becoming an instructor herself. Shortly before Season 3, Yong passes away, but Kim receives a vision of his ghost, telling her that the Dragon had left him and chosen her and that Kim will one day save the world. At his funeral, Kim learns that Yong had bequeathed her a box, inside which she finds a pair of golden nunchaku. When she touches them, she is visited by the spirit of Yeouiju, the dragon worshiped by her family and one of the Astral Plane's escaped Guardians. Yeo tells her that he has chosen her as his vessel, granting her a dragon tattoo, and explains she must find the Watchman of the Gods, as together they can defeat Gargos. Emerging from the vision, she is attacked by Shadow Jago, but Yeo's spirit materializes alongside her and aids her in battle against him. As Hisako appears to recover the defeated Shadow Jago's body, she begins training with Yeo to prepare for Gargos's arrival, determined to fulfill her destiny. She is eventually recruited by Jago to the Alliance, and receives guidance from the spirit of Hisako alongside Yeo, standing with them against the Mimics.

==== Maya ====
Voiced by: P.M. Rodriguez (KI 2013)

Maya Fallegeros is an Amazonian warrior who had banished Gargos prior to the events of Killer Instinct 2, for which she was heralded as a heroine among her people. When Gargos reappears, Maya's tribe, feeling that she had failed them, casts her out. Maya's goal is to destroy Gargos and regain her former standing with her people. Maya's No Mercy (ultimate combo) moves are summoning an elephant to fall on her enemy and shrinking them with a ray from her headband.

In Killer Instinct for Xbox One, Maya returns, now heavily redesigned with Incan-inspired armor and part of a secret society of monster hunters known as the Night Guard, sealing away artifacts and monsters too powerful to destroy. Growing up in the clan's Andes citadel alongside her twin sister Mira, the two would often explore the passages below, with Maya developing a fascination with "Temperance" and "Vengeance", a pair of cursed daggers once used by Kan-Ra. Years later, the two become full agents of the Night Guard, becoming one of the clan's best monster-hunting teams. On one particular mission, Mira sacrifices herself to save Maya, leaving the remaining sister with survivor's guilt. As a result, her actions on missions become careless and end up exposing the Night Guard to the world, attracting ARIA's attention. ARIA orders Cinder and Ultratech's agents to raid the temple for its secrets, inadvertently releasing Kan-Ra. Maya is left as the last surviving member of the Night Guard and takes up Temperance and Vengeance, which have begun to take hold of her mind, to hunt down both him and the monsters that escaped. With Aganos' help, she eventually finds and defeats Kan-Ra, sending him through a portal to another dimension, but peering into the portal, she receives a vision of an impending invasion by the forces of Gargos and vows to reform the Night Guard and gain allies to fight in the coming war. She recruits Jago, Orchid, and T.J. Combo to her cause, but they are ambushed by Ultratech forces and trapped, only to be spared as ARIA recalls her agents following Gargos' summoning.

==== Tusk ====
Voiced by: Chris Jai Alex (KI 2013)

Tusk is a barbarian who wants to fight all of the challengers for the right to destroy Gargos. In his ending, he and Maya are married following the defeat of Gargos. His ultimate-combo moves are summoning a meteor shower to pummel his opponent (with a large one crushing them) and summoning a dinosaur which eats the opponent.

Tusk appears as a playable character in the third season of Killer Instinct for Xbox One. He has been re-imagined as an ancient barbarian warrior who led his people against Gargos's Mimic forces when they attempted to invade thousands of years ago. Though felled by Gargos, Tusk is brought to the Astral Plane by the godlike Ichorean race, who grant him the gift of immortality and the mythical blade Warg-gram. Tusk's resurrection catches Gargos off guard, wiping out his Mimics and forcing him to retreat, earning the title of "Watchman of the Gods". The barbarians he travels with give him the name "Tunth-ska", or "Tusk", due to his sword's resemblance to a walrus's tooth. Tusk survives for millennia without aging, becoming world-weary and distancing himself after watching friends and family grow old and die. Two years prior to Season 3, Tusk battles Shadow Jago in a Swedish village, and is defeated by his Oblivion Shard relic, which wipes his memories in the process. However, Warg-gram badly burns Shadow Jago when he attempts to take it, forcing him to retreat. Hisako finds the comatose Tusk and seals him and Warg-gram in an ice cave so he can recover. Tusk awakens two years later, but has lost many of his memories, including his original purpose. He builds a cabin from the remains of his old ship the Wavewalker, attempting to regain his lost memories, and Warg-gram shows him visions of both Gargos and Kim Wu. When ARIA and her forces arrive to abduct Tusk for study, Tusk repels them and gives chase, stowing away in an Ultratech transport. However, he is found and captured by Cinder, forcing Tusk to destroy the ship and crash back into the ice. During Gargos's invasion, Gargos sends his minions to retrieve Warg-gram, as it will give him the power to slay even immortal beings. Tusk receives help from Kim Wu, who recruits him to the Alliance, though he begins to be tempted by Gargos's promise of removing his immortality and allowing him to finally die.

=== Introduced in Killer Instinct (2013) ===
In addition to the following, three guest characters were also introduced to the series from other franchises: the Arbiter from Halo, General RAAM from Gears of War, and Rash from Battletoads.

==== Aganos ====
Voiced by: Zachary Quarles

Aganos is an ancient war golem, the last of its kind. Constructed as one of a thousand by powerful Mycenaean artisans roughly 3500 years prior, the golem is powered by the Eye of the Ancients, a relic granting him sentience and power from the Astral Plane. Following the fall of Mycenae, invaders remove the gem, making the golem subservient, and it serves various masters as an obedient tool of war for a thousand years, replacing its damaged parts with whatever natural materials are available. Eventually, one Babylonian King restores the Eye to the golem and gives it the name Aganos (from Greek, "ἀγανός", "one of gentle disposition"), teaching it of kindness and the ways of the world, hoping it would choose to overcome its original violent purpose. Years later, learning of the traitor Kan-Ra's survival and growing dark power, the now dying King orders Aganos to hunt down and kill Kan-Ra. As thanks for his kindness, Aganos pledges to fulfill his master's last request, and has since pursued Kan-Ra for centuries, though neither has yet been able to destroy the other. Eventually, during one of their battles, Kan-Ra is captured by the Night Guard and imprisoned for over 500 years until the present day, when Ultratech's attack on the city releases him. Forced to resume his pursuit, Aganos allies with Maya to track down Kan-Ra and destroy him. Kan-Ra lays a trap for Aganos and steals most of his energy before escaping, leaving him too weak to fight back as Cinder installs Fulgore technology into him, allowing Ultratech to control Aganos's mind. Sent to attack Maya and her allies, he is ultimately freed from Ultratech by Thunder, who offers to help Aganos find Kan-Ra in exchange for help finding Eagle, to which Aganos agrees.

Aganos is the largest character in the Killer Instinct series. He has the ability to gather natural materials into his body, affecting his strength and maneuverability. These resources can be used as projectiles or to create destructible barriers behind or in front of himself, changing the boundaries of the stage.

==== ARIA ====
Voiced by: Karen Strassman

ARIA is an AI and the CEO of Ultratech. Beginning in the late 1940s, the Ultrafine Atomic Technologies Company, later rebranded as Ultratech, began attempting to simulate life and human frailty through a computational matrix. Called the Advanced Robotics Intelligence Architecture, or ARIA, the experiment was meant to find an end to famine, disease, poverty, and other forms of human suffering, with founder Ryat Adams hoping to make amends for the atrocities he committed during World War II and cure the degenerative disease killing his wife. Using knowledge and technology gained from the Roswell UFO incident, Ultratech continues to refine and enhance the ARIA core program over many years, drastically expanding its capabilities and understanding of the human condition. Following the passing of Adams, his will includes instructions for ARIA to continually run its programming to achieve its original purpose. In the present, ARIA leads Ultratech and carefully studies the rest of the cast during the first season. Believing humanity has grown weak and complacent as extraterrestrial and supernatural phenomena become more frequent, ARIA decides to force humanity to evolve by any means necessary. She enacts a plan to "prepare the way", building an army of Fulgores and Stalkers, stealing Glacius' DNA for use in Project Cinder, and tricking Kan-Ra into opening a rift to another dimension. ARIA's plan succeeds, and she summons Gargos's forces to Earth, planning to use her armies to defeat the demon and become humanity's savior and ruler. Realizing she cannot succeed alone, she decides to form an alliance with Maya's forces to stand against the coming threat.

ARIA was first teased in a secret ending in Season One before becoming a playable character in Season Two. ARIA's AI is capable of uploading into one of three different combat drone bodies: Booster Drone, Blade Drone, and Bass Drone. The three share basic moves with the others, but each has its own set of unique special moves and properties, with ARIA able to switch between bodies during a fight and use all three at once during Instinct mode. Inactive drones can be called to assist ARIA, but this leaves them vulnerable to attack, limiting ARIA's abilities if any of them are destroyed; players can only defeat ARIA once all three drones are destroyed.

==== Eagle ====
Voiced by: Thomas tátlo Gregory

Eagle is a Native American warrior and Thunder's younger brother. A former winner of the Killer Instinct tournament, Eagle publicly protested the evils of Ultratech, leading to his mysterious disappearance shortly thereafter. Thunder enters a later tournament hoping to discover the truth of what happened, but is led to believe Eagle perished at Ultratech's hands, though no body was ever found.

In the series' reboot, Eagle—AKA tipyeléhne—is raised with Thunder on a Nez Perce reservation in Idaho, becoming skilled at boxing and wrestling. After undergoing a vision quest, he begins training to become an ultimate fighter, though he never tells Thunder what he saw. Following their parents' death, Eagle becomes a member of the Disavowed and infiltrates the first Killer Instinct tournament hoping to find incriminating evidence, but he is found and captured, with Ultratech publicly reporting him as being killed in the tournament. Eagle's body is kept in stasis while ARIA locks his mind in a virtual world, interacting with him via a holographic avatar to study his mind and using his brain as a template for the Fulgore Mk. III's neural network. Ultimately, he is freed from Ultratech by Glacius, who escapes the facility with his body. To help him recover his strength, Glacius augments Eagle's body using his technology and builds him a robotic bird to assist him in battle, and the two ally themselves to destroy ARIA and Ultratech.

While only being mentioned in Thunder's backstory in the original Killer Instinct, and playing a minor role in the Killer Instinct comic series, Eagle was later made a playable character following Season Three of the 2013 Killer Instinct. His fighting style utilizes a cybernetic Tech Short Bow, for which he carries a small supply of arrows; these can be recovered after being fired by picking them up off the ground during battle. Eagle is also aided by a robotic Weyekin Bird, whom he can command to attack opponents or retrieve stray arrows. Like with Thunder, Microsoft worked closely with the Nez Perce to maintain authenticity to the tribe's culture when designing the character.

==== Hisako ====
Voiced by: Alpha Takahashi

Hisako is a Japanese Onryō who lived during the Sengoku period of Japan. Born over 500 years ago as Chiharu (千春, lit. "One Thousand Springs"), she lives in a farming village in Tōsandō with her family. Her rōnin father, Tatsunari, trains her in the art of combat for her protection, most prominently with the naginata. Shortly after her 19th birthday, Chiharu rejects the advances of a renegade shogun's son and shames him in combat; days later, she returns from training to find the shogun's forces have retaliated by burning her village and murdering many of the villagers, including her entire family. Enraged, Chiharu takes up her father's naginata and continues his battle, slaughtering many of the raiders. Though she, too, is killed, her heroic sacrifice inspires the other villagers to fight even harder, successfully repelling the invaders. A shrine is erected in Chiharu's honor, where her ashes are interred along with those of her family; her real name forgotten over the years, the villagers refer to her as Hisako (久子, lit. "Eternal Child"), saying her spirit still protects the village. However, in the present, the village and her family's grave are desecrated by Ultratech due to ARIA's desire to study life after death, attempting to draw Hisako out. Hisako's soul, having manifested as an Onryō, returns from the Astral Plane and seeks vengeance on Ultratech before she fades from the world once more. Defeating other supernatural beings to absorb their power and remain on the Mundane Plane, Hisako finds and defeats ARIA, allowing her spirit to rest. However, Tatsunari's spirit appears to her and warns her of the danger Gargos poses to the Astral and Mundane Planes and she chooses to act as a gatekeeper between the two, seeking to prevent Gargos's forces from escaping. Following Gargos's invasion, Tatsunari's spirit appears to her again and grants her his Astral katana, itself a coalesced Guardian, to help her in her duties as gatekeeper. This causes Chiharu's spirit to be cleansed of her vengeance and be reborn as a celestial being, freeing her from the bonds of her grave, and she takes on the new name of "Shin Hisako".

Hisako uses a "Wrath meter" that gives her attacks the added effect of becoming counter-hits, even when her opponent does not attack, as well as a teleport, a low dash, and several command grabs. Following Season 3, a new version of Hisako, named Shin Hisako, was introduced; this version wields a katana in place of a naginata, and has completely different moves and properties, including the ability to summon a spirit that can be converted into a projectile or a homing target for Shin Hisako's teleport and leaping attacks.

==== Kan-Ra ====
Voiced by: Edward Bosco

Kan-Ra is a 3500-year-old Babylonian sorcerer. He was a royal vizier who began researching immortality after developing a fascination with Aganos, the golem that served as the King's royal guard. His continued research into the dark arts leads him to attempt to steal the throne, planning to use a spell to seduce the Queen and have her murder the King. However, the spell wears off prematurely and the Queen kills herself out of guilt, exposing Kan-Ra's treachery. In retaliation, the King exiles him and orders his sorcerers to curse him with a withering rot that slowly disintegrates his flesh and organs. To prevent the rot from overtaking him, Kan-Ra places even more curses on himself to offset the rot's effects, seeking out magical artifacts and talismans to ease the pains brought on from the additional curses. He has since clashed many times with Aganos, under orders to destroy the sorcerer, but neither has ever managed to eliminate the other. Over the years, Kan-Ra uses his dark magic to secure places of power in many civilizations, including deceiving an Inca tribe into believing he was a god and forcing them to build a citadel for him to conduct his studies, seeking to open a door to the Astral Plane to harness its power. However, after being weakened in a battle with Aganos, he is unable to defend himself against the Night Guard, who burn him alive and lock away his ashes in the citadel, which they claim for themselves. Centuries later, an attack by Ultratech on the city accidentally releases him, and he escapes. Stealing Glacius's power core from Sadira, he uses it to create a Siphon, draining the energy from his foes to restore his own. Discovering Omen, he opens a portal to the Astral Plane in the citadel to study him further, but is thrown in by Maya and discovers Gargos's army of Shadow Lords. Believing he can control them, Kan-Ra steals Aganos's energy and uses it to fully open the portal, but he inadvertently frees Gargos's minions in the process. Seeking redemption, he joins the Alliance and begins creating tools to weaken and defeat Gargos, but in secret, he seeks to subjugate both Gargos and those who would oppose him, taking their powers for his own.

Kan-Ra uses a fighting style based around magic and matter manipulation. He uses a number of ranged attacks, combined with ground and air-based trap techniques.

==== Kilgore ====
Voiced by: Zachary Quarles

Kilgore is a prototypical combat android manufactured by Ultratech. Prior to creating the Fulgore line, Ultratech develops a line of cyborgs under the codename UA-CCIX, utilizing chain gun arms and high-caliber artillery in place of plasma-blade claws. However, despite its effectiveness at killing, the machine's combustible engine is prone to overheating and its teleportation system suffers frequent glitches. Deemed too unstable to be viable, Ultratech ultimately cancels the project in favor of the Fulgore Mk 1, though several hundred are produced before the decision is made. Most are sent to the scrapheap, but one unit begins to develop self-awareness and rewrites its own code to account for its hardware deficiencies. Intrigued, ARIA nicknames the unit "Kilgore" and has it placed into storage. Years later, ARIA attempts to reactivate Kilgore to aid in the fight against Gargos, but it goes rogue and begins terminating Fulgore units. With the aid of the Alliance, ARIA subdues Kilgore and reprograms it as an ally.

Kilgore shares several attacks and animations with Fulgore, but is also capable of chain gun fire for fast long-range combat. Using multiple chain gun attacks in succession will increase their rate of fire. However, repeated use of chain gun attacks will cause Kilgore's arms to overheat, giving bullets the ability to inflict fire damage but decreasing their range and firing rate. Kilgore can manually vent his arms and cool them, returning them to their normal state; venting will also occur automatically after a short period of time. Activating Kilgore's Instinct will give chain gun fire its overheated properties without sacrificing its range or rate of fire. Kilgore can also use rocket propulsion both as an offensive move and a means of quickly moving around the stage.

==== Mira ====
Voiced by: Fryda Wolff

Mira Fallegeros is Maya's fraternal twin sister and a former member of the Night Guard. The two grow up together and, under their father's tutelage, become the Night Guard's best team of hunters. On a mission to kill the "New Tsar" and his coven of vampires in the Siberian Mountains, Mira and Maya are cornered by the monsters and Maya is severely wounded. To save her sister, Mira triggers a cave-in that traps her beneath the rubble but allows Maya to escape, presuming Mira to be dead. However, the Coven retrieve her body and present her to the Tsar, who mutates her into a vampiress and grants her the Gloves of Rasavatham, a pair of gauntlets that allow her to convert her blood into liquid metal for weaponized use. Gradually becoming smitten with her new power, she swears fealty and spends the next five years doing various jobs for the Tsar, ascending the Coven's ranks. On the orders of the Tsar, who swears allegiance to Gargos while plotting to steal his power and rule the Earth, she breaks into Castle Sabrewulf and steals the Book of Khepri, an artifact capable of opening dimensional portals, seeking to access the Astral Plane and create a rift large enough for Gargos to escape. During Gargos's invasion, she attempts to lure Maya to join her side, though she turns against Gargos after his minions kidnap and hold Maya hostage.

Mira's abilities include an airdash, summoning bats, and shapeshifting into an invulnerable mist state, with her attacks doing heavy damage. However, her Blood Offering technique causes her to sacrifice some of her remaining health with each special move, turning a portion of her remaining health silver. She can heal some of this recoverable health using her Embrace command grab, but she takes damage very easily and will still be defeated if she runs out of red health regardless of the recoverable health remaining. Mira's existence was initially leaked from an early build of Season 3, before being officially teased by the developers in Tusk's trailer.

==== Omen ====
Voiced by: Chase Ashbaker

Omen is a winged demon calling himself the Herald of Gargos. He serves his master without question, promised his own kingdom on Earth in exchange for his obedience. Originally too weak to exist on the Mundane Plane outside of a physical host, he briefly possesses Jago under Gargos's orders, transforming him into Shadow Jago and using him to strike down potential threats and feed shadow energy back into the Astral Plane. Ultimately, Jago's will proves too strong and Omen is forced out, but by battling foes while controlling Jago's body, he gains enough shadow energy to create a corporeal form for Omen that can manifest on the Mundane Plane, with Shadow Jago becoming his own being as well. In an attempt to lure Gargos out, Omen is later defeated by ARIA shortly after the portal to Gargos's dimension is opened. Having savored the human sensations he experienced during possession, Omen now seeks to repossess Jago and remove his soul, mutating into an Astral/Human hybrid, but is torn between his desire for power and loyalty to Gargos.

Though he shares some basic moves with Jago, Omen has several unique abilities, including a mid-air dash, multiple types of projectiles with random effects, and a Shadow attack called Demonic Despair that converts all remaining health into white health if it connects. Prior to the release of the game's "complete" editions, Omen was only available to players who purchased the Killer Instinct Season Two "Combo Breaker Pack" or "Ultra Edition".

==== Sadira ====
Voiced by: Erika Harlacher Sadira fights using blades on her forearms and webs she can produce from her body.

Born in a refugee camp on the Thai border, Sadira survives by training in muay boran from a young age, developing a taste for violence. As a teenager, she is recruited by the Red Eyes of Rylai, a female insurgent group, and quickly rises up their ranks, with the Master of the Red Eyes treating her as a daughter. Eventually, Sadira becomes their top assassin, but develops rash behavior and a superiority complex. One night, during a ceremonial battle, she poisons and kills the Master and takes her spider necklace, which comes to life and bites her, imbuing her with a dark power and spiderlike abilities. Under Sadira's leadership, the Red Eyes expand to become a global force for assassinations. Impressed, ARIA recruits Sadira to "prepare the way" by stealing Glacius' DNA and the fold core from his ship, using it to open a rift to another dimension. However, the power core is stolen from her by Kan-Ra before she can use it, and when she starts digging up Hisako's grave, this awakens the spirit, who pursues her relentlessly and seriously wounds her. She returns to her lair and only barely survives an attack by Cinder, ordered by ARIA to eliminate her for her failures. Seeking revenge on ARIA, Sadira is visited by Omen, who offers her the chance to turn against ARIA and join Gargos's forces.

== Merchandise ==
A collectible card game based on the series was manufactured by Topps and released in 1996; it was Nintendo's first foray into collectible card games and contained low-resolution renders from the original game. All three games also received soundtrack releases.

Killer Instinct was adapted twice into a comic book series: the first was by Acclaim Comics, who published two three-issue miniseries in 1996 based on the first two games. The second is from Dynamite Comics, which released a six issue miniseries continuing the events of the 2013 game from September 2017 to April 2018. A trade paperback of all six Dynamite issues was released on September 11, 2018.

An official arcade stick made by Mad Catz was released to coincide with the 2013 game's launch. A series of collectible character figures was released by Ultimate Source in 2016, with each figure including a code to unlock an exclusive in-game color for their respective character in the 2013 game; these colors were later made available to all players as part of Anniversary Edition.
