= Killer Instinct 2 =

1996 video game

- Arcade flyer
- Developers: Rare; Code Mystics (Classic)
- Publishers: Nintendo; Midway Games; Microsoft Studios (Classic)
- Directors: Ken Lobb; Lee Schneuman
- Producer: Chris Stamper
- Designers: Chris Tilston; Kevin Bayliss; Mark Betteridge
- Composer: Robin Beanland
- Series: Killer Instinct
- Platforms: Arcade, Xbox One, Xbox Series X/S
- Release: NA: January 1996; EU: 1996; Classic; October 15, 2014
- Genre: Fighting
- Modes: Single-player, multiplayer
- Arcade system: Killer Instinct MIPS Based Hardware System

Killer Instinct 2 is a 1996 fighting game developed by Rare and published by Nintendo. The sequel to Killer Instinct (1994), it was originally released by Midway for arcades. A modified version of Killer Instinct 2 was published for the Nintendo 64 as Killer Instinct Gold the same year. A Super Nintendo Entertainment System version of Killer Instinct 2 was developed and completed, but never released. A digital port of the game for the Xbox One is bundled with the second season of Killer Instinct (2013), under the title Killer Instinct 2 Classic in 2014.

== Gameplay ==
As with most fighting games and indeed its predecessor, two characters square off with the goal of depleting the opponent's life bar. As with the original Killer Instinct, when a character's original life bar is fully depleted, he or she will fall to the ground, and immediately begin on his or her second lifebar.

As with the first game, Killer Instinct 2 relies on an automatic combo subsystem in its matches. The matches, as with Killer Instinct, revolve around a three strength system (Quick, Medium and Fierce). However, normal moves have lost a lot of their priority and range, as well as gaining extra recovery time. Throws have been added into the game to deal with blocking characters (as opposed to the top attack in Killer Instinct). Additionally, characters can be knocked down much easier with normal moves than in the first game, ending the possibility of opening with a 'glitch' combo and also weakening the effectiveness of normal moves. Normal special moves no longer are judged on priority, but instead follow a three tiered 'rock, paper, scissors' system, in which a certain special move will always break another certain special move (similar to the three tiered system in Soulcalibur).

Additionally, a Super bar has been added to the game (similar to Street Fighter Alpha or The King of Fighters series). This super bar fills as a fighter takes damage or executes an attack that is blocked by the opponent. After the bar reaches a certain point, the player can use a multi-hit Super Move which is usually an extended version of a normal special move.

The combo system has its roots in the original Killer Instinct. By pressing a certain strength button after an opener move, a player will launch an auto-double and initiate the combo system of the game. Unlike the first game, players can now open up combos with new and much less risky moves than before (most notable a close Fierce punch or close Fierce kick). Additionally, Super Moves can be placed into combos, greatly increasing their damage and potency as well as being unbreakable. Additionally combos can be extended using throws, super linkers, manual-doubles, and super end specials. As a result of the weakened normal moves and other changes to the system, combos have now become more devastating in Killer Instinct 2. In an apparent effort to help ease this dominance, combo breakers are now easier to perform. Unlike combo breakers in the first game, which also required a three tiered 'rock, paper, scissors' system based on strength to break, combos are now broken depending on the type of attack. Punches break kick doubles, and kicks will break punch doubles.

Parry, an advanced new addition, allow an open counter-attack after a successful parry block. A player can assume a standing defensive position and cause the attacker to temporarily freeze if the parry is successful, and from there either perform a special stunning technique or a three-hit variant of a Special Move.

The finishing moves have also been reworked. Now each character can only execute these attacks when the opponent's second life bar flashes red (unlike the first Killer Instinct the opponent falls when he or she loses all of his or her energy bars). Each character has two Ultimate combo moves (one of them can be executed without executing a combo), the Humiliation sequences were dropped, and the Ultra combo feature is still intact. Although the finishing moves in Killer Instinct share certain similarities to that of the Mortal Kombat Fatalities including depictions of blood and the killing of defeated opponents, they are generally less graphic in nature. Finishing moves involving explicit dismemberment or decapitation are absent from the series.

== Plot ==
Killer Instinct 2 follows on where the first installment left off. Eyedol's death at the hands of Black Orchid accidentally sets off a time warp, transporting some of the combatants back in time and allowing the Demon Lord Gargos (Eyedol's opponent) to escape from Limbo.

After that incident, the combatants are trapped 2000 years in the past along with several new combatants, and they fight for the right to face Gargos in combat. Each character that survived the journey from the first game has a corresponding backstory, while new characters in this installment are native inhabitants of this past time period. Some fighters, like returning fighter T.J. Combo, have a motive of escaping the past while others, such as new character Tusk, are motivated to fight Gargos and his reign. Unlike the previous installment, there is no tournament or prize money central to the plot, rather a fight to determine the fate of the future.

=== Characters ===
The game features a total roster of 11 characters. Black Orchid, Jago, Sabrewulf, Spinal and T.J. Combo return from the previous title. A new Fulgore Mark II prototype replaces the Fulgore Mark I from the first game while Glacius is replaced by another member of the same species, who assumes the former's name. Eyedol, Chief Thunder, Cinder, and Riptor were omitted from the roster; Gargos, Kim Wu, Maya, and Tusk were introduced in their place.

Each character in the game has four or eight different endings. Which ending the player gets depends whether or not the player kills (by using a finishing move instead of simply depleting their health) one or more certain character(s) during the course of the game, as well as destroy certain objects on stages. For example, Jago's endings both involve Fulgore and B. Orchid (if Fulgore does not kill Jago and B. Orchid, they team up and destroy him), as well as Ultratech's destruction (on Fulgore's museum stage). Thus, killing or not killing them, as well as destroying or not destroying Ultratech, over the course of the game alters the outcomes of his endings:

- If he kills Fulgore, destroys Ultratech, and spares Orchid, his enjoyment of his enemy's demises is only sweetened by the discovery that Orchid is his older sister, and the two siblings return to the present without Ultratech.
- If he kills Fulgore, and spares Ultratech and Orchid, the two siblings return to the present to battle the rebuilt Ultratech.
- If he spares both their lives, but destroys Ultratech, Orchid saves him from Fulgore's attack and they return to the present without Ultratech.
- If he spares both their lives, as well as Ultratech's, he and Orchid return to the present to battle the rebuilt Ultratech right after destroying Fulgore.
- If he kills both of them, as well as destroys Ultratech, he relishes his victory over Fulgore, but feels an inexplicable emptiness in his heart which he must live with for the rest of his days.
- If he kills both of them, but spares Ultratech, he is forced to fight Ultratech alone.
- If he kills Orchid and destroys Ultratech, but doesn't destroy Fulgore, the cyborg will eventually kill him, but without Ultratech, Fulgore searches for an ancestor of Jago's (as well as Orchid's) to erase his nemesis from existence.
- If he kills Orchid, but doesn't destroy Fulgore nor Ultratech, the cyborg will eventually kill him, and fulfills Ultratech's original purposes by seizing control of the world.

== Development and release ==
Development began shortly after the release of its predecessor. This was done by a small team led by Lee Schneuman and Ken Lobb. One of its programmers Martin Hollis left partway as development started to work on Goldeneye 007 (1997). According to Lobb, eliminating excessive defense play "was the absolute highest priority. I felt that this was not a problem for experts, but it hurt beginners. We now reward the aggressor big time". The team used the same hardware from its predecessor. They believed the characters needed redesigns. Kevin Bayliss, who served as designer, redesigned each characters to suit the sequel after its events. The game’s music was primarily composed by Robin Beanland, who had worked with Graeme Norgate on its predecessor and with the other team. Norgate contributed to some tracks, but left partway in development to compose music for Blast Corps (1997) and Goldeneye 007.

=== Killer Instinct Gold ===
Killer Instinct Gold is an updated version of Killer Instinct 2 that was released for the Nintendo 64 shortly after the launch of the console. The game suffered some graphical downgrades and the endings for each character do not change (as they would in the Arcade version) due to the memory limitations of the Nintendo 64 cartridge. Other than that, Killer Instinct Gold remains faithful to the original Killer Instinct 2.

The new features include:

- Team Battles, in which one can fight with up to 11 characters.
- Team Elimination Battles, in which one has to finish his or her opponents off with Finishing Moves (finishing moves similar to Mortal Kombat's Fatalities, which can be executed immediately) instead of simply depleting their life bar with normal moves, or they will simply return later on in the match (however as the computer player will sometimes use Gargos as the last opponent, victims can be removed from play anyway as he lacks a finishing move).
- Training and Advanced Training, in which the player can learn the moves of the character they have chosen as well as the correct execution of combos, doubles, auto-doubles link moves, etc.
- Options menu, which allows the player to modify certain data, such as the speed of the game, the color of the blood, button configuration, sound and manage Controller Pak data.
- Unlockable content, such as alternate colors for characters and scenarios, and faster degrees of speed for the game.
- The game's final boss Gargos is playable with a code.

Killer Instinct Gold is compatible with the Nintendo 64's Controller Pak to save options and high scores, though the cartridge also includes internal save. Due to cartridge size limitations, several frames of character animation and the FMVs were removed, the later being replaced with 2d animations. Each character's multiple endings were also reduced to one ending a character; these new endings sometimes combining elements from more than one of a character's arcade endings.

The stages were recreated in full 3D, as opposed to the scaling and distorting FMVs used for the stage backgrounds in the arcade version, allowing more dynamic camera takes at the beginning of the battle, while using less memory consumption.

Killer Instinct Gold was later included as part of the Rare Replay compilation, and on the Nintendo Classics service.

=== Killer Instinct 2 Classic ===
A digital port of the game's arcade version, titled Killer Instinct 2 Classic, was released as part of the "Season 2 Ultra Edition" of Killer Instinct for the Xbox One. The digital version of the game was developed by Code Mystics and published by Microsoft Studios and supports online multiplayer via Xbox Live.

== Soundtrack ==
Killer Instinct Gold also released its original soundtrack, as the first Killer Instinct under Rare Label, titled Killer Instinct Gold Cuts. It is a 16-track-audio-CD, which includes original tracks from the Arcade versions plus two remixes and the Training Mode track. The soundtrack, along with several unreleased KI2 demo tracks, was included as part of the Killer Instinct Season 2 double-album set released on August 4, 2015.

== Reception ==
Though not as critically acclaimed as its predecessor, Killer Instinct 2 still garnered positive reviews and was a commercial success. Critics praised its improvements, combo system, graphics, and sound, but others were critical of its inconsistent frame rate, slow pace, and lack of advancement from its predecessor. A reviewer for Next Generation commented that while the game includes new fighting elements such as a super bar, the essence of the original game is essentially recycled. He also criticized that while the characters are larger and more detailed, this is at the cost of slower game speed and a choppier frame rate. Summarizing that "if you like the style of fighting that relies more on memorizing combos than hand-eye coordination and, in a way, skill, Killer Instinct II is full of that same fighting style", he scored it 3 out of 5 stars.

Brazilian magazine SuperGamePower gave the arcade version 5 out of 5 on all five categories.

In 2013, Rich Knight and Gus Turner of Complex included it on their list of 25 best 2D fighting games of all time, stating that "not quite as good as the first, Killer Instinct 2's greatest strength and weakness were one and the same: it played too much like Killer Instinct. ... A solid game, but not enough so to overshadow its predecessor".
