= Robin Beanland =

British composer

- Occupation: Composer

Robin Beanland is a British composer of video game music, composing music for numerous Rare titles, such as the Killer Instinct franchise, Conker's Bad Fur Day (which he also co-wrote the screenplay with Chris Seavor), and many others. Prior to joining Rare, Beanland composed music for TV and films. The only current game that he continues to produce music for is Sea of Thieves.

== Video game music credits ==
Year	Title	Notes
1994	Donkey Kong Country	With Eveline Fischer and David Wise
1994	Killer Instinct	With Graeme Norgate
1996	Killer Instinct 2/Gold	
1997	GoldenEye 007	With Norgate and Grant Kirkhope
1999	Conker's Pocket Tales	With Fischer
1999	Jet Force Gemini	With Norgate and Alistair Lindsay
1999	Donkey Kong 64	Support team
1999	Donkey Kong Country (GBC Version)	Donkey Kong Country Game Boy Color Team
2000	Perfect Dark	Staff ("Trent's Henchmen")
2001	Conker's Bad Fur Day	Also co-wrote the game's script with Chris Seavor
2002	Star Fox Adventures	Performed various instruments
2003	Donkey Kong Country (GBA version)	With Jamie Hughes
2004	Sabre Wulf	
2004	It's Mr. Pants	With Fischer and Wise
2005	Banjo-Pilot	With Hughes
2005	Conker: Live & Reloaded	
2005	Kameo	Sound effects and character voices.
2006	Viva Piñata	Sound effects and character voices.
2008	Viva Piñata: Pocket Paradise	Rare Family
2008	Banjo-Kazooie: Nuts & Bolts	With Kirkhope and Dave Clynick
2010	Kinect Sports	With Dave Clynick
2010	Sonic & SEGA All-Stars Racing	Special thanks
2010	I Wanna Be the Boshy	Uses music from Killer Instinct
2011	Kinect Sports: Season Two	
2012	Kinect PlayFit	
2012	Fable Heroes	With Steve Burke
2013	Killer Instinct	Original themes, special thanks
2014	Kinect Sports Rivals	
2015	Rare Replay	With Richard Aitken
2018	Sea of Thieves	With Chloe Kwok
2018	Super Smash Bros. Ultimate	Original game supervisor (Banjo & Kazooie DLC)
2020	Battletoads	Special thanks
Cancelled	Everwild	

== Awards ==
Year	Title	Recipient	Result
2001	British Academy of Film and Television Arts award	Conker's Bad Fur Day	Win
2019	Ivor Novello Award for Best Original Video Game Score for	Sea of Thieves	Win

== See also ==
- DK Jamz
