= Double Helix Games =

American video game developer

- Type: Subsidiary
- Industry: Video games
- Predecessors: The Collective; Shiny Entertainment
- Founded: October 9, 2007; 19 years ago
- Defunct: February 5, 2014; 12 years ago
- Fate: Merged into Amazon Game Studios Orange County
- Successor: Amazon Games Orange County
- Headquarters: Irvine, California, US
- Number of employees: 75 (2014)
- Parent: Foundation 9 Entertainment (2007–2014); Amazon (2014)

Double Helix Games was an American video game developer based in Irvine, California, founded in October 2007 through the merger of The Collective and Shiny Entertainment, two studios owned by Foundation 9 Entertainment. Double Helix was acquired by Amazon and integrated into Amazon Game Studios in February 2014.

== History ==
Double Helix Games was formed as the result of a merger between The Collective and Shiny Entertainment, two video game developers owned by Foundation 9 Entertainment. Shiny had been acquired by Foundation 9 in October 2006 under the terms that it would co-locate with the already-owned The Collective. On October 9, 2007, it was announced that both studios had relocated to new 60,000-square-foot (5,600 m^{2}) offices in Irvine, California, and were being merged, which was expected not to result in any job losses. The amalgam, led by Michael Persson, received the name "Double Helix Games" in March 2008.

In July 2009, as part of a round of consolidations within Foundation 9, Double Helix suffered an undisclosed number of staff cuts. On February 5, 2014, Double Helix announced that it had been acquired by retailing company Amazon. The studio was integrated into the Irvine location of the retailer's Amazon Game Studios division, which had been established in 2012. Microsoft Studios, the publisher of Double Helix's Killer Instinct, stated that it would be working with a new development partner to continue development on the game.

== Games developed ==
Year	Title	Platform(s)	Publisher(s)
2008	Silent Hill: Homecoming	Microsoft Windows, PlayStation 3, Xbox 360	Konami Digital Entertainment
2009	G.I. Joe: The Rise of Cobra	PlayStation 2, PlayStation 3, PlayStation Portable, Wii, Xbox 360	Electronic Arts
2010	Front Mission Evolved	Microsoft Windows, PlayStation 3, Xbox 360	Square Enix
2011	Green Lantern: Rise of the Manhunters	PlayStation 3, Xbox 360	Warner Bros. Interactive Entertainment
2012	Battleship	PlayStation 3, Xbox 360	Activision
2013	Killer Instinct (season 1)	Xbox One	Microsoft Studios
2014	Strider	Microsoft Windows, PlayStation 3, PlayStation 4, Xbox 360, Xbox One	Capcom
2014	UFOs Love Cows	Android	Amazon Game Studios

=== Canceled ===
- Harker (2008)
