= Perfect Dark (disambiguation) =

Perfect Dark is a video game released for the Nintendo 64 in 2000.

Perfect Dark may also refer to:

- Perfect Dark (series), a video game franchise
  - Perfect Dark (Game Boy Color video game), a video game released for the Game Boy Color in 2000
  - Perfect Dark (2010 video game), a remaster of the Nintendo 64 game, released for the Xbox 360 in 2010
  - Perfect Dark (cancelled video game), a video game formerly in development by The Initiative and Crystal Dynamics
  - Joanna Dark, a fictional character code-named "Perfect Dark"
- Perfect Dark (P2P), a peer-to-peer file sharing application
