= List of Perfect Dark media =

List of video games and other media

Perfect Dark is a video game series developed by Rare and owned by Microsoft Studios. It debuted in 2000 with the Nintendo 64 first-person shooter Perfect Dark. The series follows Joanna Dark, an agent of the Carrington Institute agency, as she uncovers conspiracies by rival corporation dataDyne. In addition to video games, the series has expanded into other media, including novels and comics. These supplements to the video games have resulted in a significant development of the series' fictional universe.

== Video games ==
=== Console games ===
Game	Details
Perfect Dark Original release date(s): NA: May 22, 2000; EU: June 30, 2000	Release years by system: 2000 – Nintendo 64
Perfect Dark Original release date(s): NA: May 22, 2000; EU: June 30, 2000	Notes: Developed and published by Rare
Perfect Dark Zero Original release date(s): NA: November 22, 2005; EU: December 2, 2005	Release years by system: 2005 – Xbox 360
Perfect Dark Zero Original release date(s): NA: November 22, 2005; EU: December 2, 2005	Notes: Developed by Rare; Published by Microsoft Game Studios
Perfect Dark Original release date(s): March 17, 2010	Release years by system: 2010 – Xbox 360
Perfect Dark Original release date(s): March 17, 2010	Notes: Developed by 4J Studios; Published by Microsoft Game Studios

=== Handheld games ===
Game	Details
Perfect Dark Original release date(s): NA: August 28, 2000; EU: 1 September 2000	Release years by system: 2000 – Game Boy Color
Perfect Dark Original release date(s): NA: August 28, 2000; EU: 1 September 2000	Notes: Developed and published by Rare

== Printed media ==
=== Novels ===
Title	Release date	ISBN	Ref.
Perfect Dark: Initial Vector	October 2005	ISBN 978-0-76-531571-7	
Written by Greg Rucka; Published by Tor Books; A sequel story to Perfect Dark Zero
Perfect Dark: Second Front	January 2007	ISBN 978-0-76-531572-4	
Written by Greg Rucka; Published by Tor Books; A sequel story to Perfect Dark: Initial Vector

=== Comics ===
Title	Release date(s)	Ref.
Perfect Dark: Graduation Day	December 2000	
Written by Stuart Taylor, art by Dave Roberts and Alwyn Talbot; Included in the Nintendo 64 game's Official Player's Guide by Nintendo Power (ISBN 978-1-93-020602-1); A 16-page mini-comic set shortly before the Nintendo 64 game
Perfect Dark: Hunting Season	December 2000	
Written by Stuart Taylor, art by Dave Roberts and Alwyn Talbot; Included in the Nintendo 64 game's Official Player's Guide by Nintendo Power (ISBN 978-1-93-020602-1); A 16-page mini-comic set one year after the Nintendo 64 game
Hong Kong Sunrise	November 2005	
Written by Eric Trautmann, art by Cold FuZion Studios; Included in the collector's edition of Perfect Dark Zero; An 18-page mini-comic set shortly before Perfect Dark Zero
Perfect Dark: Janus' Tears	August 2006–January 2007	
Written by Eric Trautmann, art by Cold FuZion Studios; Published by Prima Games; A six-part mini-series set shortly before Perfect Dark: Second Front; Released as a single book by Prima Games in March 2007 (ISBN 978-0-76-155304-5)

== Soundtracks ==
Title	Release date	Ref.
Perfect Dark Dual CD Soundtrack	November 15, 2000	
Composed by Grant Kirkhope, Graeme Norgate, and David Clynick; Published by Nintendo of America; 36 tracks on two discs with a duration of 2:18:42; Features the complete score of the Nintendo 64 game
Perfect Dark Zero Original Soundtrack	November 8, 2005	
Composed by David Clynick, MorissonPoe, and Kepi and Kat; Published by Sumthing Else Music Works; 27 tracks on a single disc with a duration of 1:13:59; Features a selection of music from Perfect Dark Zero
