= Perfect Dark (2010 video game) =

2010 video game

- Developer: 4J Studios
- Publisher: Microsoft Game Studios
- Series: Perfect Dark
- Platform: Xbox 360
- Release: March 17, 2010
- Genres: First-person shooter, stealth
- Modes: Single-player, multiplayer

Perfect Dark is a 2010 first-person shooter developed by 4J Studios and published by Microsoft Game Studios for the Xbox 360 through its Xbox Live Arcade download service. The game is a remaster of the original Perfect Dark, which was developed and published by Rare for the Nintendo 64 in 2000. Although the gameplay remains largely unchanged, the remaster features significant technical improvements over the original, including new higher-resolution textures and character models, a higher frame rate, and a multiplayer mode that supports the Xbox Live online service. The story of the game follows Joanna Dark, an agent of the Carrington Institute organization, as she attempts to stop a conspiracy by rival corporation dataDyne.

Perfect Dark was developed over a course of nearly a year and its game engine was completely re-written from scratch to support several Xbox 360 features. Therefore, although the game plays exactly the same as the original, the code and renderer is different. The game received generally favorable reviews. Some critics considered the relatively unchanged game to be outdated, but most agreed that the title was a solid revival of a classic. As of the end of 2011, the game had sold nearly 410,000 units. In 2015, the game was included in the Rare Replay video game compilation for Xbox One.

== Gameplay ==
Perfect Dark is a remastered release of the 2000 first-person shooter video game of the same name, which was developed by Rare and released for the Nintendo 64 as a spiritual successor to the 1997 hit GoldenEye 007. The game features a single-player mode consisting of 17 levels in which the player assumes the role of Carrington Institute agent Joanna Dark as she attempts to stop a conspiracy by rival corporation dataDyne. It also features a range of multiplayer options, including a co-operative mode and a "Combat Simulator" where numerous players can compete against each other in traditional deathmatch settings. Combat Simulator matches can be highly customised and can include bots. A "Counter-Operative" mode allows one player to control the protagonist while the other controls enemies throughout a single-player level, attempting to stop the first player from completing objectives.

The remaster changes little from the original's core gameplay but offers several enhancements in the multiplayer department. Multiplayer modes can now be played in either splitscreen or through the Xbox Live online service. An online leaderboard system has been added, and players can earn achievements and in-game crowns by accomplishing certain tasks. Although Combat Simulator matches are still capped at 12 entities, the remaster can comprise eight players online simultaneously, an improvement to the original's cap of four players and eight bots. Players may compete against as many as 11 bots if there are enough slots available in a match; such a feature is not possible in the original game. All multiplayer content is now unlocked from the beginning, and weapons from GoldenEye 007, which had originally been exclusive to the single-player mode, are now available in the multiplayer. The remaster also includes two new control set-ups, entitled "Spartan" and "Duty Calls", which are based on the Halo and Call of Duty first-person shooter franchises, respectively.

== Development ==

The original skyboxes (top) were remodeled for the remastered version (bottom). Additionally, new textures were used and weapon models were recreated in higher polygon counts.

Perfect Dark was developed by 4J Studios, the same studio that previously developed the Xbox Live Arcade versions of Rare's platform games Banjo-Kazooie and Banjo-Tooie. According to Microsoft Game Studios creative director Ken Lobb, the development team "took the original code, ported it to the Xbox 360 and included deep [Xbox Live] integration". The game was developed over a course of approximately 11 months after the creation of a working prototype. As the Xbox Live functionality had to be written from scratch, the developers opted to completely rewrite the game engine rather than do a port through emulation. As a result, although the game plays exactly the same, the code and renderer are different. The game runs at 1080p and 60 frames per second.

While the original level geometry was kept, the levels received new textures, characters and weapons were recreated, and skyboxes were rebuilt. Lobb explained that "things are large and blocky because that's what [Perfect Dark] looks like", meaning that the sharper textures and higher resolution simply make the game look clearer. He also observed that, as character and weapon models were remodeled from their original low hundreds polygon count to polygons in the thousands, he was worried about them looking awkward in the low-poly geometry level design. According to him, "it's one of the areas that I give a lot of credit to the developer on. It just looks right. They were smart about the way they up-resed the models so they still feel like they're kind of retro, but they're clean".

Although music and sound effects were kept from the original recording sessions, original master recordings have been used to update the soundtrack at a higher quality; the original recording size was 16 MB, while in the remaster it is over 250 MB. Developers retained the free aim mode because they wanted to be faithful to the original game. According to Rare's Producer Nick Ferguson: "We didn't change the fundamental behavior of the aiming system simply because that is not how Perfect Dark was played". He also observed that the idea of updating the controls was actually seen as a flaw in Perfect Dark Zero, which tried to "combine the original Perfect Dark system with aspects of Halo". The original diagonal running, which allows players to move faster than by running forwards or sideways alone, did not work the first time they implemented the analog stick, so it was manually rewritten because it was considered essential for speedruns.

== Marketing and release ==
Perfect Dark was first teased to consumers in April 2009 via a screenshot of a Rare employee's Xbox 360 dashboard which showed an icon for the game. It was confirmed to be in development on June 2, 2009, via Xbox Live Director of Programming Larry Hryb's Twitter account. The game was released on March 17, 2010, as part of Microsoft's Xbox Live Block Party promotion. As a cross-promotion with Crackdown 2, players with a Crackdown 2 saved game on their Xbox 360 hard drive can unlock that game's protagonist, known as Agent 4, as a playable skin in the game's multiplayer mode. A selection of cheats, which could originally be unlocked by connecting to Perfect Dark for Game Boy Color using the Transfer Pak, can also be unlocked if the game detects a Perfect Dark Zero save file. A title update was released in April 2010 which addressed bugs, added two control schemes, and expanded playlists. Perfect Dark was downloaded over 150,000 times during its first week of release and grossed approximately $1.61 million at the end of the month. The game has sold more than 285,000 units as of August 2010 and nearly 325,000 units at the end of 2010. As of year-end 2011, sales had increased to nearly 410,000 units. In 2015, Perfect Dark was included in the Rare Replay compilation for Xbox One. In 2019, the game was enhanced to run at native 4K resolution on Xbox One.

== Reception ==
Reception

Aggregate score
Aggregator	Score
Metacritic	79/100

Review scores
Publication	Score
1Up.com	B+
Eurogamer	8.0/10
Game Informer	8.5/10
GameSpot	7.5/10
GameZone	8.5/10
IGN	9.0/10

Perfect Dark received "generally favorable" reviews from critics, according to review aggregator Metacritic. Writing for 1UP.com, Scott Sharkey highlighted the technical improvements, stating that the remaster is "a great way to re-enjoy a game you already love". IGN editor Daemon Hatfield noted the game's outdated dialogue, voice acting, and mission objectives, but nevertheless remarked that the game "wasn't brought back for the uninitiated—this is for the fans, and they will be very, very happy". He also praised the game's multiplayer mode over Xbox Live and highlighted the selection of weapons, the satisfying gunplay, and leaderboards, noting that they allow players to compare their performance with their friends.

Despite the praise, some reviewers criticized the game for its confusing level layouts and felt they have not held up very well over the years. Christian Donlan of Eurogamer stated that Perfect Dark is "not afraid to throw dead ends at you seemingly for the hell of it, or repeat textures so much in its huge maps that you can get a little dizzy". GameSpot reviewer Tom Mc Shea noted that the campaign was "oddly paced", and that "locked doors, unused rooms, and dead ends... can be disheartening to stumble around in a circle until you finally happen upon the correct door you just couldn't locate". Nevertheless, he admitted that "it's a lot of fun to replay them to try for high scores and figure out the many unique objectives". He also remarked that online play can periodically suffer from a significant amount of lag, but praised the amount of content and features.

The game's original Counter-Operative mode was very well received, with Eurogamer remarking that it "still feels ahead of its time even now". Dan Ryckert of Game Informer stated similar pros, saying that "it's even better this time around thanks to the framerate improvement". Although the game's controls have been upgraded to support two analog sticks, GameZone noted that the game still "feels a little different from what modern day shooter fans are used to", while Eurogamer remarked that the aim assist can be unnecessarily generous on easy difficulties. At the end of March 2010, IGN named Perfect Dark Xbox Live Arcade Game of the Month.
