= Duncan Botwood =

British voice actor and video game designer (born 1972)

Duncan Lewis Botwood (born 8 March 1972, Stafford) is a British video game designer and voice actor. He worked for British game developer Rare from 1995 to 2008. He was senior designer at the company. Botwood's first work was GoldenEye 007.

He was one of the first members of the team and worked closely with Martin Hollis and David Doak. Botwood constructed the levels and did most motion capture with head model designer, Beatrix. He next worked on Perfect Dark as level designer, wrote the story of the game and designed the way weapons would work. He later worked on Perfect Dark Zero, designing the multiplayer.

Botwood provided voice talent to some of the projects on which he worked, voicing Andross in Star Fox Adventures and Mr Blonde in Perfect Dark. He had a cameo in GoldenEye 007 as the Naval Officer. Botwood left Rare in 2008 and worked for Ubisoft Montpellier. He then worked at Codemasters before joining Ubisoft Toronto in 2012 as a Lead Level Designer. In 2016 he was promoted to Associate Level Design Director in Watch Dogs: Legion.
