= Bonsai Barber =

2009 video game

- Developer: Zoonami
- Publisher: Nintendo
- Designer: Martin Hollis
- Platform: Wii
- Release: NA: March 30, 2009; PAL: August 7, 2009; JP: April 6, 2010
- Genre: Simulation
- Modes: Single-player, Multiplayer

Bonsai Barber is a barber-simulation video game developed by Zoonami and released for the Wii console in Europe, North America in 2009, it was released in Japan 2010. This video game was a featured WiiWare title for 1,000 Wii Points on the Wii Shop Channel.

== Gameplay ==
Bonsai Barber places players in the role of a barber who must groom and style the foliage of their plant, fruit and vegetable customers in similar manner to the art of bonsai pruning. Using the Wii Remote, the player uses tools such as scissors for cutting, hair clippers for precision cutting, combs to bend twigs, hairspray to re-grow foliage, and pots of paint to change hair color. Players work on the requests of up to five customers per day and try to achieve a professional five star rated cut for each, unlocking new haircuts each day. Players will unlock medals and gifts for performing well, with the incentive to return the next day to continue obtaining those rewards. If you miss appointments with the in-game patrons, you will get notified in your Wii Message Board; an additional reminder to return to the game the next day and continue cutting hair. Players could send photos of their completed stylings to friends via WiiConnect24.

== Development and release ==
Bonsai Barber was developed by Zoonami. Three prototypes of the game were developed on and off by a team of two people before the game moved into full development. In total, development for Bonsai Barber stretched over a period of two and a quarter years. The game was released in North America on the WiiWare service on March 30, 2009.

== Reception ==
Reception

Aggregate score
Aggregator	Score
Metacritic	75/100

Review scores
Publication	Score
Eurogamer	6/10
GamesRadar+	4/5
IGN	8/10
Nintendo Life	8/10

Bonsai Barber received generally favorable reviews from critics, according to the review aggregation website Metacritic. IGN commended the tight, responsive controls and the quirky nature of the game, but also called it a pricey one trick pony. Official Nintendo Magazine loved the concept and the humor and called it "an enjoyable, idiosyncratic experience".
