= Zoonami =

British video game development studio

- Company type: Private company
- Industry: Software & programming
- Founded: 1998
- Defunct: 2010
- Headquarters: Cambridge, United Kingdom
- Key people: Martin Hollis
- Products: Zendoku, Go! Puzzle
- Number of employees: 10
- Website: www.zoonami.com

Zoonami was a video game development company, founded in 1998 by Martin Hollis, the director and producer of GoldenEye 007. He left Rare shortly before Perfect Dark was released while other members of the GoldenEye 007 team formed Free Radical Design. The studio was closed "a couple years" before 2012. Titles released as Zoonami include Zendoku, Go! Puzzle, and Bonsai Barber.

== Games developed ==
In October 2006, Eidos announced Zendoku, a Sudoku-based game developed by Zoonami for the Nintendo DS and PlayStation Portable. Zendoku was released in the United States on 12 June 2007, and was released in Europe on 20 April 2007.

Zoonami released its second game, Go! Puzzle for the PlayStation 3's downloadable service in February 2009. Go! Puzzle's mini-games and characters were designed by Zoonami, but the actual development was done by Cohort Studios.

Zoonami released its third game, and the first game for WiiWare, Bonsai Barber, in North America on 30 March 2009, and in Europe on 7 August 2009. It was published by Nintendo.

=== Dropped projects ===
A GameCube project originally titled as Game Zero (although the title was dropped when it was discovered that the name conflicted with a pre-existing gaming review magazine) was once in development, though this is considered to no longer be the case. The project was mentioned briefly on the company's website but has not been discussed since its removal from the site and subsequent notice in interviews that the name had been dropped from the project. The game was a radical block-based build-and-mine game for GameCube, similar in concept to Minecraft but predating it by a number of years.

Zoonami also announced a prototype of the one-button music game Funkydilla but were unable to find a publisher for the game.

== See also ==
- 1998 in video gaming
