= Martin Hollis =

Martin Hollis may refer to:

- Martin Hollis (video game designer) (born 1971), British computer and video game designer, founder and CEO of Zoonami
- Martin Hollis (philosopher) (1938–1998), English rationalist philosopher
