= Wedding Wars (TV series) =

- Cast
- Country of origin: United States
- Original language: English
- No. of seasons: 1
- No. of episodes: 10

Production
- Running time: 60 minutes

Original release
- Network: VH1
- Release: March 14 – May 16, 2011

Wedding Wars is a reality television show the ran on VH1 in which engaged couples compete to win their ultimate wedding. The grand prize is a $100,000 wedding and a $25,000 nest egg. The contestants live in a similar conditions as CBS' Survivor. There is a gift challenge, in which couples compete in competitions and the winner wins a prize for their wedding, such as bouquets, tuxedos, and wedding dresses. There is also a security challenge, in which couples compete in competitions and the winner is safe from elimination. The winner of the security challenge receives a cake-topper (a mock-up model of the couple). The couples then go to Couple's Chapel, a ceremony where couples vote off other couples, and the couple with the most votes is eliminated. The show was hosted by Michele Merkin.

== Contestants ==
Couple	Eliminated	Placing
Joseph and Elsie	Winners	
Rich and Marina	Episode 10	Runners Up
Mario and Melinda	Episode 10	3rd Place
Michael and Sharon	Episode 9	4th Place
Brandon and Jessica	Episode 8	5th Place
Jemol and Yolanda	Episode 7	6th Place
Kevin and Angel	Episode 6	7th Place
Brandon and Stephanie	Episode 5	8th Place
Hollywood and Kat	Episode 4	9th Place
Jay and Dee	Episode 3	10th Place
Frankie and Sofia	Episode 2	11th Place
Johnnie and Celestria	Episode 1	12th Place

== Episodes ==
=== Episode 101 ===
First aired March 14, 2011

Twelve engaged couples touch down at the luxurious Turtle Bay resort in Hawaii, ready to battle it out for a $100,000 dream destination wedding and a $25,000 nest egg. One problem: instead of staying in the lap of luxury, they learning they'll be living deep in the jungle in open air huts. Shocked couples quickly realize war is hell and attack with full force; first competing for bridal gowns and tuxes in a gift challenge, and later the coveted "cake topper" in a security challenge. Strategies and groups start to form as one couple tries to take control of the camp early. But in the end, it's up to all the couples, because a collective vote determines the first casualty of this Wedding War.

- Gift Challenge: The couples must search through hundreds of gift boxes to find their specific wedding dress and tuxedo that are marked with their names on them. The first couple to stand on their heart in their wedding attire wins.
- Gift Challenge Prize: Wedding gown, tuxedo, and dresses for the entire bridal party ($20,000 value)
- Gift Challenge Winners: Kevin and Angel
- Security Challenge: The Love Knot
- Security Challenge Winners: Joseph and Elsie
- Eliminated Couple: Johnnie and Celestria

=== Episode 102 ===
First aired March 21, 2011

Eleven couples remain. Would-be blushing brides turn ugly as their claws come out when they try to snatch up the most wedding bouquets in a gift challenge. Winner gets a $5,000 flower prize package. Losers get bruises and tears. All the women learn Stephanie is a force to be reckoned with. At the security challenge, the guys have to hold their fiancées above a makeshift threshold. Last one to drop their lady in the ocean wins security for him and his fiancée. It's battle of endurance, emotion, and back pain. At the chapel ceremony, the vote count catches one couple by surprise and they're sent home without their dream wedding.

- Gift Challenge: The men will throw bouquets of flowers up over the back of their head and the women have to catch it and run back past a line. The woman with the most bouquets at the end will win the package.
- Gift Challenge Prize: Floral package ($5,000 value)
- Gift Challenge Winners: Brandon and Stephanie
- Security Challenge: Each couple is on a platform in the ocean. The men must hold their fiancées and the last one standing in the winner.
- Security Challenge Winners: Hollywood and Kat
- Eliminated Couple: Frankie and Sofia

=== Episode 103 ===
First aired March 28, 2011

Ten couples and their stomachs are up against a cake-eating contest with a terrible twist: 3 layers of disgusting cake to get through. The challenge becomes a puke fest but the couple with the toughest stomachs and greatest mental will win! Melinda and Mario show their sneaky side and their plans works. The security challenge is all about communication as the camp is divided into two teams. The team transporting champagne the fastest using small pieces of bamboo can't be eliminated. This challenge leaves one team thirsty for victory and another drunk with power. During Chapel Ceremony, the couples cast votes between which couple doesn't want their dream wedding enough and which couple is manipulating the camp.

- Gift Challenge:
- Gift Challenge Prize: Wedding cakes ($2,500 value)
- Gift Challenge Winners: Brandon and Stephanie
- Security Challenge:
- Security Challenge Winners:
- Eliminated Couple: Jay and Dee

=== Episode 104 ===
First aired April 4, 2011

Nine couples are left; it's still anybody's game as long as they are on the majority side. Every couple battles gladiator style for their dream Vegas bachelor/bachelorette party. Yolanda gets fierce! The security challenge is all about helium, teamwork and inflatable objects. With a surprise result from the security challenge, it is a scramble to figure out who will be divorced from the wedding party. And the end, it's the most explosive chapel ceremony yet with plenty of fighting words... and this time it's personal.

- Gift Challenge:
- Gift Challenge Prize: Vegas Bachelor/Bachelorette Party ($10,000 value)
- Gift Challenge Winners: Hollywood and Kat
- Security Challenge:
- Security Challenge Winners:
- Eliminated Couple: Hollywood and Kat

=== Episode 105 ===
First aired April 11, 2011

Eight couples remain. The tension erupts into a full-blown shouting match around the campfire. The fight escalates well into the night with hands on bodies and lines drawn in the dirt. This Wedding War is getting ugly. The camp is torn in two and Elsie just can't understand what's going on! At the prize challenge, the couples compete for a photography prize package by posing like fools in love; or in some cases, just fools. Despite their feverish strategizing, no couple feels safe any more. At the security challenge, the couples try to prove why they deserve their dream wedding more than everyone else. It's a campfire pity party in the name of love. Chapel elimination looms and one couple will be kicked out of this wedding party.

- Gift Challenge:
- Gift Challenge Prize: Photographer ($3,000 value)
- Gift Challenge Winners: Kevin and Angel
- Security Challenge: "Couples Counseling"
- Security Challenge Winners: Mario & Melinda
- Eliminated Couple:
- Eliminated Couple: Brandon and Stephanie

=== Episode 106 ===
First aired April 18, 2011

The Wedding War camp remains divided for our seven couples, with five couples in a strategic pact to stop the other two from winning a dream wedding. But the majority's solidarity is in danger when one couple wins too many gift challenges talk of sacrificing one of their own rules the camp. Kevin and Angel can't hide their power, but it might cost them in the long run. Everyone competes for $20,000 worth of diamonds in a tubular gift challenge. At the security challenge, they put their compatibility to a public test, as they place their priorities in harmony to earn security. Then, at the chapel ceremony, the choice between eliminating an easy target and taking out a strong challenge competitor is more difficult than anyone could've imagined.

- Gift Challenge:
- Gift Challenge Prize: Diamond jewelry ($20,000 value)
- Gift Challenge Winners: Kevin and Angel
- Security Challenge:
- Security Challenge Winners: Jemol and Yolanda
- Eliminated Couple: Kevin and Angel

=== Episode 107 ===
First aired April 25, 2011

Old bonds are tested; new partnerships are made. The remaining six couples struggle to maintain fragile relationships while positioning themselves to win it all. A surprise win in a fast-paced gift challenge leaves one couple with an awesome musical gift and the losers head back to camp all wet. Rich and Marina decide to get their heads in the game. The security challenge throws one group into chaos and forces nearly everyone to rethink who their friends are. Saving up for a nest egg was never this hard! One couple risks everything in order to survive elimination while others work tirelessly behind their campmates' backs to secure their own places in the final. Just when everyone thinks they have their votes in place, a heated argument turns everything upside down.

- Gift Challenge:
- Gift Challenge Prize: Deejay ($3,000 value)
- Gift Challenge Winners: Rich and Marina
- Security Challenge:
- Security Challenge Winners: Rich and Marina; Joseph and Elsie
- Eliminated Couple: Jemol and Yolanda

=== Episode 108 ===
First aired May 2, 2011

The remaining five couples are so close to a dream wedding they can almost taste it. Problem is, it's about to taste terrible. The hungry couples are given access to a delicious buffet and must compete to see who can gain the most weight. Winner gets cash for the catering at their wedding. Losers get a bloated belly. Brandon and Jessica are just happy to finally be eating and Brandon was smart to figure out that eating the food with the most water would lead them to victory. At the security challenge, the couples are pushed to their limits on land and sea as they attempt to light a unity candle and secure their spot for another week. The chapel ceremony sees another couple voted out with their dreams of a destination wedding crushed.

- Gift Challenge:
- Gift Challenge Prize: Catering and venue for wedding ($7,500 value)
- Gift Challenge Winners: Brandon and Jessica
- Security Challenge:
- Security Challenge Winners:
- Eliminated Couple: Brandon and Jessica

=== Episode 109 ===
First aired May 9, 2011

The final four couples remain in camp fighting for their dream destination wedding. At the gift challenge, couples must dig for buried treasure, or in this case, gift cards. The couple with the highest dollar amount in uncovered cards wins a $10,000 gift registry. Next, the couples compete in the most important security challenge yet. The winner of this challenge will secure themselves a spot in the final. Just as each couple must wrestle with their reception seating chart, our couples wrestle with remembering and seating their guests at a giant reception table. The stress of competition eats at Michael and Sharon. At the chapel ceremony, one couple will just miss the opportunity to compete in the finals and win their $100,000 dream destination wedding and a $25,000 nest egg.

- Gift Challenge:
- Gift Challenge Prize: Gift registry ($10,000 value)
- Gift Challenge Winners: Michael and Sharon
- Security Challenge:Seating chart
- Security Challenge Winners:Joseph and Elsie
- Eliminated Couple: Michael and Sharon

=== Episode 110 ===
First aired May 16, 2011

The final three. It's been long, damp, mosquito bitten battle to the finish and no one wants to lose the war now. At the final security challenge, runaway brides are stuck on floating treadmills, running ever faster as their fiancées furiously paddle to save them. At stake is a guaranteed spot in the final two. Plus, the winning couple decides who gets voted off next. After the decision is made, the final two couples head to the final chapel ceremony. At the chapel ceremony, all the eliminated couples return to decide who gets the dream destination wedding. After a brutal round of questioning and confrontation... the winning couple cleans up and immediately enjoys the wedding of their dreams, surrounded by friends and family. This Wedding War is over.

- Gift Challenge:
- Gift Challenge Prize:
- Gift Challenge Winners:
- Security Challenge:
- Security Challenge Winners: Rich and Marina
- Eliminated Couple: Mario and Melinda
- Final Two: Rich and Marina; Joseph and Elsie
- Wedding Wars Winners: Joseph and Elsie
