= WiiWare =

Digital store and distribution service for the Wii

- Developer: Nintendo
- Type: Online market
- Launched: JP: March 25, 2008; NA: May 12, 2008; PAL: May 20, 2008
- Discontinued: January 30, 2019
- Platform: Wii
- Status: Discontinued

WiiWare was a digital media entertainment service operated by Nintendo that allowed the download of games and applications developed for the Wii video game console. These games and applications could only be purchased and downloaded from the Wii Shop Channel under the WiiWare section. Once the user had downloaded the game or application, it would appear in their Wii Menu or SD Card Menu as a new channel. WiiWare was a companion to the Virtual Console, which specializes in emulated games originally developed for other systems instead of original games.

WiiWare was promoted as an avenue for developers with small budgets to release innovative, original, and smaller-scale games without the cost and risk of creating a title to be sold at retail (akin to Xbox Live Arcade and the PlayStation Store). The development kit cost around US$2000 and developers needed to be licensed with and approved by Nintendo. According to Nintendo, the "remarkable motion controls will give birth to fresh takes on established genres, as well as original ideas that currently exist only in developers' minds". Nintendo handled all pricing options for the downloadable games.

Like Virtual Console games, WiiWare content was purchased using Wii Points. However, unlike Virtual Console games, instruction manuals were stored on the Wii Shop Channel itself.

Unlike its portable equivalent, DSiWare, WiiWare games are unavailable natively via the Nintendo eShop. WiiWare games were purchasable and fully playable on the Wii U console – the Wii's successor – via Wii Mode. Ever since the Wii U launched in November 2012 with its vastly improved Nintendo eShop digital distribution, in comparison to the DSiWare Shop, the Wii Shop Channel had very rarely seen brand new WiiWare releases. As of July 2014, the Wii Shop Channel has received the global release of Retro City Rampage (February 2013), the global re-release of a retail Wii game called Deer Drive Legends (November 2013), and the North American re-release of a retail Wii game called Karaoke Joysound (July 2014).

Wii Shop Channel closed on January 30, 2019, and the WiiWare games on the Wii (as well as the backwards compatibility on the Wii U) can no longer be purchased. Until further notice, users can continue to re-download and/or transfer WiiWare titles.

== Games ==
The WiiWare service was officially launched in 2008: on March 25 in Japan, on May 12 in North America, and on May 20 in the PAL/UK regions.

In October 2007, Nintendo held a press conference in Japan revealing the first batch of major Japanese WiiWare games including My Pokémon Ranch, Dr. Mario Online Rx, and Square Enix's Final Fantasy Crystal Chronicles: My Life as a King. The conference also disclosed information on Family Table Tennis, Mojipittan, Maruboushikaku, and Magnetica Twist. Game developer Hudson also announced 3 WiiWare titles: Bomberman Blast, Star Soldier R, and Joysound, the latter a karaoke game. Hudson later revealed that it had at least 10 WiiWare titles in development for the first year of release. Capcom, Namco, Sega, Taito and Konami also subsequently announced and later released games for the service.

Among Western developers, Telltale Games was one of the first to cite interest in the service, announcing the episodic Strong Bad's Cool Game for Attractive People series of adventure games. GarageGames released a version of their game engine to support WiiWare software development. Other Western developers releasing WiiWare games include Gameloft, Neko Entertainment, WayForward Technologies, Zoonami, Frozen Codebase and High Voltage Software. Konami and Capcom had also expressed desire to release Western-exclusive WiiWare games.

Upon the service's shutdown, WiiWare games in Japan and North America were priced between 500 and 1500 Nintendo Points. Additional downloadable content had been announced for several games, with My Life as a King seeing extra content priced between 100 and 800 Points, Final Fantasy IV: The After Years receiving content ranging from 300 to 800 Points, and Mega Man 9 and 10 seeing content priced between 100 and 500 Points.

== Criticism ==
Martin Hollis, founder of Zoonami, has accused Nintendo of inadequately promoting the WiiWare service:

"Apple have had such massive success in capturing media attention – they've sucked all of the air out of it, I don't know that Nintendo's putting a great deal of energy into trying to generate PR for WiiWare or DSiWare".

Other developers have criticised the 40MB size limit imposed on games on the service; the WiiWare version of Super Meat Boy was cancelled after the developer refused to compress the quality in order to pass under the size limit. Trent Oster of Beamdog, who released MDK2 on the service also criticised the file size limit, in addition to the lengthy certification process and the minimum sales requirement of 6,000 units before receiving any payment from Nintendo. For Brian Provinciano, the developer of Retro City Rampage, the threshold was 5,000 units, which the game failed to hit.
