= The Next Best Thing (TV series) =

- Created by: Peter Engel Productions
- Presented by: Michele Merkin
- Judges: Jeffrey Ross; Elon Gold; Lisa Ann Walter
- Country of origin: United States
- Original language: English
- No. of seasons: 1
- No. of episodes: 8

Production
- Running time: 60 minutes
- Production companies: Peter Engel Productions; Bahr-Small Productions; New Wave Entertainment

Original release
- Network: ABC
- Release: May 30 – July 25, 2007

The Next Best Thing: Who is The Greatest Celebrity Impersonator? is an American Reality television series competition of celebrity impersonators with a grand prize of US$100,000 (equivalent to $155,272 in 2025). It was hosted by Michele Merkin. The judges were Jeffrey Ross, Elon Gold and Lisa Ann Walter; ultimately, the winner was chosen by viewer voting. The eight-episode series debuted May 30, 2007 on ABC and ended the same year.

== Episodes ==
The premiere featured contestants impersonating (among others) Howard Stern, Jack Nicholson, Jackie Gleason, Art Carney, Superman, Jennifer Aniston, Janet Jackson, Bill Cosby, Billy Crystal, Whoopi Goldberg, Phil McGraw, Hank Williams Jr., Arthur (Fonzie) Fonzarelli, and Avril Lavigne.

== Semi-finals ==
The judges narrowed down the contestants to 30 semi-finalists, 28 of whom were featured in fully shown performances over two episodes. The semi-finalists were:

- Chris America as Madonna
- Sandy Anderson as Dolly Parton
- Sebastian Anzaldo as Frank Sinatra
- David Born as Robin Williams
- Trent Carlini as Elvis Presley
- Erv Dahl as Rodney Dangerfield
- Donny Edwards as Elvis Presley
- Marcel Forestieri as Jay Leno
- Craig Gass as Al Pacino
- Roger Kabler as Robin Williams
- Anne Kissel as Roseanne Barr
- Suzanne LaRusch as Lucille Ball
- Buck McCoy as Tim McGraw
- Garry Moore as Little Richard
- John Morgan as George W. Bush
- Jim Nieb as George W. Bush
- Sharon Owens as Barbra Streisand
- Natalie Reid as Paris Hilton
- Pavel Sfera as Bono
- Stacey Whitton Summers as Shania Twain
- Brigitte Valdez as Celine Dion
- Cookie Watkins as Tina Turner
- Mike Wilson as Simon Cowell
- Mark Staycer as John Lennon

== Finalists ==
Of the 30 semi-finalists, the judges chose the following 10 to be finalists:

- Sebastian Anzaldo
- Trent Carlini
- Donny Edwards
- Roger Kabler
- Suzanne LaRusch
- Garry Moore
- John Morgan
- Sharon Owens
- Natalie Reid
- Cookie Watkins
- Erv Dahl

== Order of finish ==
American viewers voted, and ranked the finalists in the following order:

1. Trent Carlini
2. Sebastian Anzaldo
3. Donny Edwards
4. John Morgan
5. Suzanne LaRusch

As the winner, Trent Carlini received $100,000.

== Trivia ==
- The ten finalists of season 1 included two Elvis Presley impersonators; to reduce confusion, they were named "Blue Suede Elvis" (Donny Edwards) and "Heartbreak Elvis" (Trent Carlini), after the songs "Blue Suede Shoes" and "Heartbreak Hotel."
- Little Richard appeared as a "surprise celebrity guest" in the last episode of season 1 (#108).

Elvis Dipping Michele Merkens With Her Rumble Band, Earrings, lipstick, Tube Top Dress, Bracelet, & High Heel shoes, the people remember The Next Best Thing Episode 8 July 10, 2007 on the YouTube videos.
