= Go! Puzzle =

2007 video game

- Developers: Zoonami; Cohort Studios
- Publisher: Sony Computer Entertainment
- Platforms: PlayStation 3, PlayStation Portable
- Release: PAL: 20 November 2007; NA: 7 February 2008
- Genre: Puzzle
- Modes: Single-player, multiplayer

Go! Puzzle is a puzzle video game developed by British developers Zoonami and Cohort Studios and published by Sony Computer Entertainment for the PlayStation 3 and PlayStation Portable.

== Gameplay ==
Go! Puzzle consists of three separate puzzle games - Swizzleblocks, Aquatica and Skyscraper.

=== Swizzleblocks ===
In Swizzleblocks, the player uses a reticle to flip connected blocks, matching four of the same colour to clear the screen. Power-ups can be used to assist, and the game allows for up to four players in local multiplayer.

A screenshot of Swizzleblocks

=== Aquatica ===
Aquatica takes a Puzzle Bobble approach, with the player connecting same-coloured 'sea mines', and not letting the screen fill up with them.

A screenshot of Aquatica

=== Skyscraper ===
The player is an astronaut in Skyscraper, tasked with moving from one side of a building to the other before ascending to the next floor. A level of strategy is involved, as the player must decide which path is best.

A screenshot of Skyscraper

== Reception ==
Go! Puzzle received mixed reviews from critics. Many chose Skyscraper as the standout game, with GameSpot noting that "you'll fail over and over before you move on to the next level, but it's enjoyable enough that you won't mind repeating levels." Eurogamer noted that Go! Puzzle's graphics look 'fine', but the game lacks personality.
