= Zendoku =

2007 video game

- European Nintendo DS cover art
- Developer(s): Zoonami
- Publisher(s): Eidos Interactive
- Director(s): Martin Hollis
- Producer(s): Martin Hollis
- Designer(s): Alain Vitus
- Programmer(s): Richard Brooksby; Paul Hankin; Gareth Rees
- Artist(s): Graham Galvin
- Writer(s): James Leach
- Platform(s): Nintendo DS, PlayStation Portable
- Release: Nintendo DS: EU: April 20, 2007; NA: June 26, 2007; PSP: EU: April 20, 2007
- Genre(s): Puzzle
- Mode(s): Single-player, multiplayer

Zendoku is a 2007 puzzle video game developed by Zoonami and published by Eidos Interactive for the Nintendo DS and PlayStation Portable handheld consoles.

== Gameplay ==
Screenshot showing Zendoku multiplayer on the Nintendo DS

Zendoku is a variation of Sudoku, offering a slightly more combative experience than simply lining up numbers. Players must now insert symbols, rather than the standard numbers. Players choose characters and choose to attack or defend against a challenger, which takes place via mini-games started upon filling in a group of numbers. The game is set against anime-influenced backdrops and has a "light-hearted martial arts" theme. The game also offers single-player puzzles.

== Development and release ==
Zendoku was developed by Zoonami and published by Eidos Interactive for the Nintendo DS and PlayStation Portable handheld consoles. According to Zoonami CEO Martin Hollis, the game's focus is on fun and innovation, stating that the company wanted to turn "a familiar paper and pencil game into a puzzling, battling, micro-gaming, fighting extravaganza." In North America, Zendoku was released to retailers on June 18, 2007.

== Reception ==
Zendoku received generally mixed reviews from critics. The UK Nintendo Magazine, ONM praised the DS version of the game for its colourful graphics, but criticized it for the confusing system of using symbols instead of numbers, as well as the minigames feeling tacked on and more of an annoyance, but finished by saying, "One for multiplayer only".

NGamer praised the multiplayer game highly, saying, "The thrill of using logical reasoning to kick someone's arse is a phenomenal experience."
