= Michele Merkin =

American model

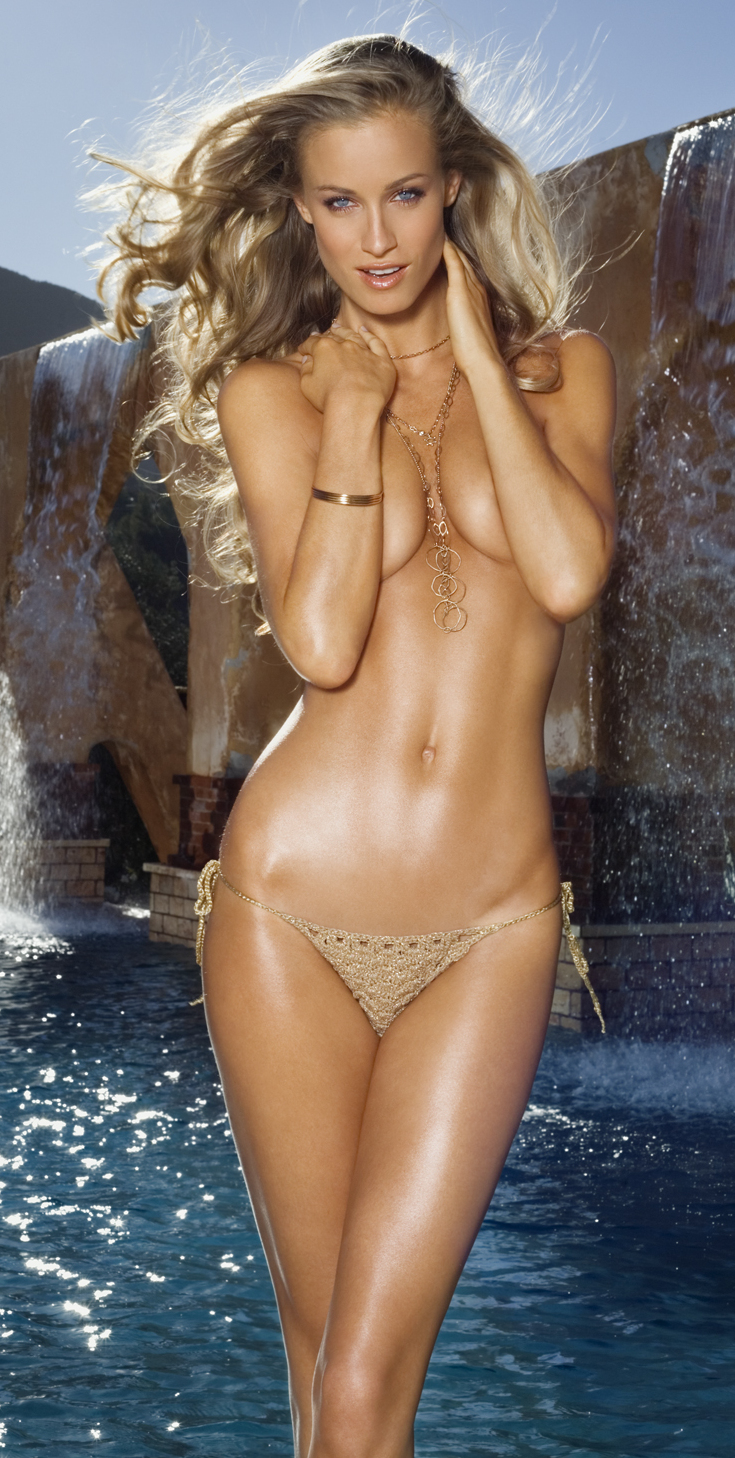
- Merkin in 2006
- Born: June 25, 1975 (age 51); Santa Clara County, California, U.S.
- Occupations: model, television host
- Spouse: Ted Waitt
- Modeling information
- Height: 5 ft 11 in (1.80 m)
- Hair color: Blonde
- Eye color: Blue
- Agency: NEXT Model Management

Michele Merkin (born June 25, 1975) is an American former model and television host.

== Early life and beginnings ==
Merkin was born in Santa Clara County, California, of Swedish and Russian Jewish descent as the youngest child of four children. She attended boarding school in England. Her mother was from Sweden and had been a model for twenty years, including an appearance in the debut Victoria's Secret catalog in 1977. Merkin was a tall child, reaching 5 ft 11 in (1.80 m) by the age of 14. This helped her play basketball, but garnered her some taunting in school, where she was called nicknames such as "Giraffa" and "Manute Bol".

Merkin began modeling part-time from the age of 15, while she was in high school.

== Career ==
=== Modeling ===
Merkin modeled for 15 years, living in Paris, Milan, New York and Los Angeles, appearing in such magazines as ELLE, Marie Claire, Harper's Bazaar and Vogue, and in more than 60 commercials, most notably campaigns for Clairol and the Nintendo video game Perfect Dark.

For Perfect Dark, Merkin appeared as the lead video game character Joanna Dark in commercials and in-store promotions for the N64 cartridge; Merkin's hair was cut short and dyed black for the appearances.

Merkin was selected for Maxim magazine's "Hot 100" list of attractive women in 2006 (at #74) and 2007 (at #56).

=== Television ===
Beginning in June 2005, Merkin co-hosted the cable television program Foody Call with Rossi Morreale, a reality television show which combined cooking and romance by teaching men to seduce women with food. It was the second highest rated show on the Style Network. After the program was canceled the following year, she admitted that the premise was faulty, saying, "... most girls I know don’t really eat. The way to a woman’s heart is definitely not through her stomach."

Concurrently, Merkin was a sideline reporter on the third season of Extreme Dodgeball which aired starting July 2005 on the Game Show Network.

In May 2007, she hosted the television series The Next Best Thing, which aired on American Broadcasting Company.

In March 2008, she hosted Sand Blasters III: The Extreme Sand Sculpting Championship on the Travel Channel.

From 2008 to 2009 she co-hosted Party Monsters Cabo on E!, a reality television show in which participants compete to determine who is the best party event planner.

Merkin has also hosted individual episodes of E! News Daily, NBC's For Love or Money, VH1's Red Eye, The Movie Fan Show, The Love Report for Studios USA, Close-up Hollywood, Buy TV, Movie Watch and Attack of the Show!.

== Personal life ==
Merkin is married to Ted Waitt, co-founder of Gateway, Inc. They married in 2011.
