= Perfect Dark (GBC video game) =

Game Boy Color video game

- European box art
- Developer: Rare
- Publisher: Rare
- Series: Perfect Dark
- Platform: Game Boy Color
- Release: NA: 28 August 2000; EU: 1 September 2000
- Genres: Action-adventure, stealth
- Modes: Single-player, multiplayer

Perfect Dark is a 2000 action-adventure stealth game developed and published by Rare for the Game Boy Color. As a direct prequel to its Nintendo 64 counterpart, the game follows agent Joanna Dark as she completes her training at the Carrington Institute research centre and uncovers information against rival corporation dataDyne. The gameplay revolves around shooting opponents and completing objectives such as rescuing hostages or recovering items. The game also includes a multiplayer mode where two players may compete against each other in several deathmatch modes.

Perfect Dark was developed simultaneously with the Game Boy Color version of Donkey Kong Country. It supports the Game Boy Printer and Game Link Cable accessories, and includes a built-in rumble functionality into the game cartridge. The Transfer Pak allows players to alternatively unlock cheat modes in the Nintendo 64 game. The game received generally mixed reviews from critics, who criticised its difficult and superficial gameplay, but highlighted its technical aspects such as graphics and compatibility features.

== Gameplay ==
The game is presented from a top-down perspective. The player's health and ammunition are displayed on the right side of the screen.

Perfect Dark is an action game that is presented from a top-down perspective and where the player can move and shoot in eight directions. The player controls Joanna Dark and must initially complete a training mode where she will have to complete a series of challenges. These include the use of stealth, in which the player is challenged to kill enemies by sneaking up behind them without making noise (e.g. running or reloading weapons), complete a memory type game that involves pressing various buttons in a specific order to open up doors, and shoot targets from a first-person perspective.

The game's single-player campaign is divided into several missions that the player has to complete while fighting enemies and completing objectives. Objectives range from rescuing hostages to exploring areas and recovering items such as keycards, explosives or laptop computers, which are useful to hack into electronic devices. The player can loot new weapons, health and ammunition from enemy corpses. The game features several mini-games, including a driving level and a sniper mission, as well as numerous boss battles that must be defeated to progress to the next level. By beating any of these mini-games, the player can access them in the game's extras menu. The game also includes a multiplayer mode where two players may compete in four different types of deathmatch modes. These range from the standard kill-the-other-person on a pre-set time to the Counter Force mode, where the first player must rescue hostages while the second player has to guard them. Various multiplayer maps are unlocked as the player progresses through the single-player campaign.

== Plot ==
Set in early 2022, Perfect Dark follows agent Joanna Dark during the final stages of her training at the Carrington Institute, a research centre founded by Daniel Carrington. After completing her training, Joanna is sent on a mission to destroy a cyborg manufacturing facility in the South American jungle. The facility is run by Mink Hunter and produces high-tech weaponry for terrorist operations. Joanna completes her mission successfully, killing Hunter and destroying the entire facility. She then reports that, during her landing in the jungle, she witnessed an aircraft being shot down and made a note of the coordinates. Carrington learns that there is a UFO in the area and that dataDyne, the Carrington Institute's rival corporation, is getting away with the alien wreckage.

Joanna is sent to investigate the crash site, but is ultimately captured and taken to the Pelagic I research vessel, along with the alien wreckage. An alien eventually rescues Joanna, telling her that she must gather as much information on the alien wreckage as possible, and then sink the Pelagic I. After succeeding, Joanna tells Carrington that the wreckage belonged to an alien race called the Skedar. The situation changes abruptly when the Carrington Institute is stormed by a dataDyne strike team who hopes to destroy any evidence against them. Joanna defends the Carrington Institute and her work earns her enough recognition to take part in her next mission. The game ends with the Carrington Institute carrying out further investigations on dataDyne.

== Development and release ==
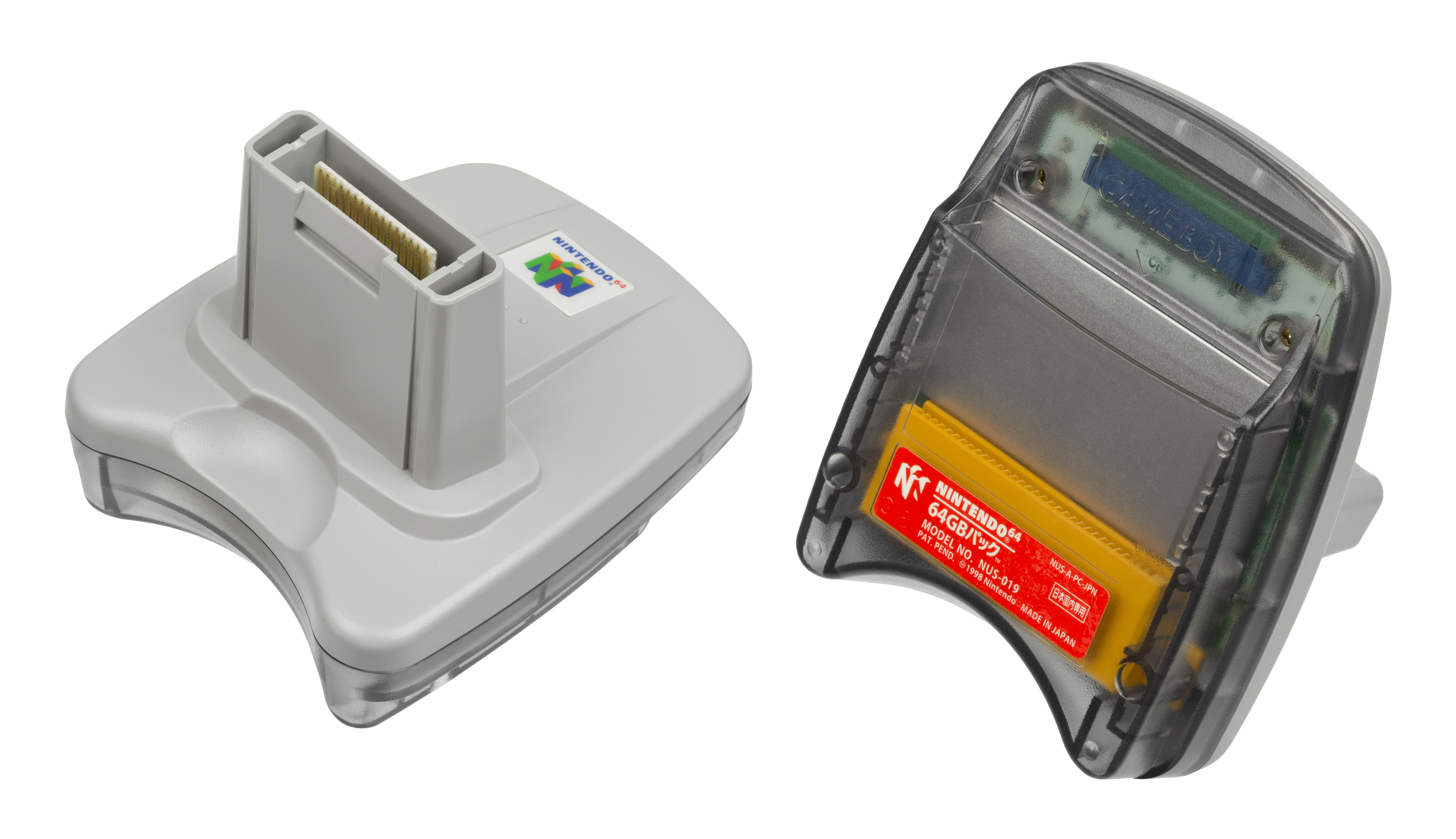
The game is compatible with the Transfer Pak, which unlocks cheat modes in its Nintendo 64 counterpart.

Perfect Dark was developed by Rare for the Game Boy Color handheld console as a prequel and supplement to the Nintendo 64 game of the same name. Although production on the game began after Conker's Pocket Tales was completed, it was delayed while Mickey's Racing Adventure was still in development. The game was developed simultaneously with the Game Boy Color version of Donkey Kong Country. The team responsible for both games was composed of 20 people and primarily included artists, designers, and programmers. An in-house software specially written by Rare was used to produce the music in 8-bit format. It is Rare's first Game Boy Color game to feature sampled sound and uses full motion video for cutscenes. The game's cartridge size is 32 megabits. The cartridge features a built-in rumble functionality which provides force feedback during gameplay.

The game supports many Game Boy accessories. These include the Game Link Cable, which is required for the multiplayer mode, the Game Boy Printer, which can be used to print out character profiles, and the Transfer Pak, which allows players to alternatively unlock cheat modes in the Nintendo 64 game. It is also possible to transfer game data from one Game Boy Color machine to another using their infrared port. The game was announced in January 2000 with a scheduled release date of 12 June 2000. The first screenshots of the game were revealed shortly afterwards, while a gameplay demo was showcased at E3 in May 2000. The game was released in North America on 28 August 2000, and in Europe on 1 September 2000. Despite its Game Boy Color-quality graphics, the game received a Teen rating from the ESRB due to its animated violence.

== Reception ==
Reception

Aggregate score
Aggregator	Score
GameRankings	66%

Review scores
Publication	Score
AllGame	2/5
Electronic Gaming Monthly	5.3/10
EP Daily	6.5/10
GameSpot	5.3/10
IGN	7/10
N64 Magazine	5/5
Nintendo Life	6/10
Nintendo Power	7.6/10
Planet Game Boy	91%

Perfect Dark received mixed reviews from video game publications. Critics praised the game's technical aspects, including graphics, sampled speech, and compatibility features, but criticised its superficial gameplay, especially when compared to Metal Gear: Ghost Babel. According to IGN, "it's obvious that an 'A' development team was put on Perfect Dark for the Game Boy Color. But I can't ignore the little gameplay and control nuances that detract from the overall fun of playing [the game], despite having a lot of variety to the entire game design". N64 Magazine and Planet Game Boy editors were more positive towards the game, praising its size and included extras. The latter went so far as to call Perfect Dark "one of the biggest handheld games ever made".

Graphically, the game was praised for its detailed backgrounds and fluid animations. However, the size of the player character was criticised because it does not allow players to properly see their immediate surroundings, resulting in players accidentally alerting nearby enemies or making it difficult for them to get a sense of where they are in the game's "maze-like" levels. IGN explained that the issue is aggravated by the health bar, which consumes valuable screen space. The Electric Playground highlighted the game's full voice conversations and numerous sound effects like footsteps and gunshots. GameSpot also noted the game's numerous sound effects, but criticised the fact that there is no music during gameplay.

The lack of checkpoints and scarcity of health and ammunition frustrated some critics, who found the game unnecessarily difficult and unforgiving. The poor artificial intelligence of enemies and stealth mechanics were also noted. According to GameSpot, "in theory you should be sneaking up on enemies, defusing bombs, and saving hostages. In practice, however, enemies turn around and attack even when you're sneaking up on them and defusing bombs requires no effort, so the suggestion of strategy is moot". Although the different mini-games were praised for giving the game variety, some reviewers felt that they were clearly imitative of games such as Spy Hunter and Operation Wolf.

The multiplayer mode was highlighted for its extensive options, but IGN remarked that "there's no real strategy involved in these deathmatch games other than to find the other person and open fire until one dies and respawns elsewhere on the map". In a retrospective review, Jon Wahlgren of Nintendo Life concluded that Rare "did a great job on squeezing so many features and technical magic into the little cart, by focusing so heavily on the tech they seem to have sacrificed a lot of what would make it more fun to play". In 2012, GamesRadar editors ranked Perfect Dark 47th on their list of the Best Game Boy games of all time, praising Rare for its adaptation of the Nintendo 64 game.
