= Perfect Dark Zero =

2005 video game

- North American cover art
- Developer: Rare
- Publisher: Microsoft Game Studios
- Director: Chris Tilston
- Producers: Richard Cousins; Lee Schuneman; Chris Kimmell
- Writer: Dale Murchie
- Composer: David Clynick
- Series: Perfect Dark
- Platform: Xbox 360
- Release: NA: November 22, 2005; EU: December 2, 2005
- Genres: First-person shooter, stealth
- Modes: Single-player, multiplayer

Perfect Dark Zero is a first-person shooter developed by Rare and published by Microsoft Game Studios. It was released as a launch title for the Xbox 360 video game console in 2005. The game is part of the Perfect Dark series and a prequel to the original Perfect Dark. The story of the game follows Joanna Dark, a bounty hunter working with her father and a computer hacker, as she joins the Carrington Institute agency to prevent a rival corporation from gaining possession of an ancient artifact which endows individuals with superhuman powers.

Perfect Dark Zero features a campaign mode consisting of 14 missions that can be played solo or co-operatively, and a multiplayer mode where a maximum of 32 players can compete against each other in numerous types of deathmatch and objective-based games. Both the co-operative and multiplayer modes support split screen, system link, and the Xbox Live online service. The game was under development for five years and was originally intended to be released for the GameCube and later the Xbox. During development, several intended features were canceled so that the game could meet the Xbox 360 launch.

Upon release, Perfect Dark Zero sold more than one million copies worldwide and received generally positive reviews from critics, who praised its graphics and numerous multiplayer modes. However, some critics felt that the game did not meet expectations, criticising single-player aspects such as its story and voice acting. After its release, the game was supported with downloadable content, expanding its multiplayer mode with new maps and new types of computer-controlled bots. In 2015, the game was included in the Rare Replay video game compilation for Xbox One.

== Gameplay ==
The gameplay shifts into a third person perspective when the player is in cover mode. The head-up display shows Joanna's health status and remaining ammunition in the weapon's magazine.

Perfect Dark Zero is a first-person shooter where players control the player character mostly from a first-person perspective. The combat features mechanics such as an evasive dodge roll and a cover system in which the gameplay switches to a third-person perspective, allowing the player to aim strategically without taking damage and be more aware of the surroundings. Players cannot jump but have the ability to automatically climb obstacles as long as they can reasonably reach them. It is also possible to climb ladders. When doing so the camera shifts into a third-person perspective. The player has a certain amount of health which decreases when attacked by enemies. The health can recharge a bit if the player steps out of the line of fire for a few seconds, but it may not necessarily refill completely depending on how much damage the player took.

Players can only carry a limited number of weapons since the inventory features a 4-slot system in which single hand-held pistols usually take a weapon slot, whereas heavy weapons like sniper rifles or rocket launchers can take up to three weapon slots. The player's movement speed is also altered by the weight of the weapon the player is currently holding. Besides the primary function, all of the weapons in Perfect Dark Zero have one or two additional function modes that generally grant the player with special abilities. For example, the Shockwave Rifle features an X-ray function which allows the player to see enemies through walls, while the Plasma Rifle has a cloak function that renders the player character invisible to enemies at the cost of its battery charge. Some weapons also feature more unorthodox secondary functions. For instance, the Laptop Gun can be deployed as a sentry gun, while the SuperDragon assault rifle can launch bouncing grenades.

=== Campaign ===
The campaign is divided into 14 missions in which the player plays as Joanna Dark. Each mission has a number of objectives that the player must complete in order to progress. To advance to the next mission, the player must complete all primary objectives, and if Joanna is killed or fails an objective, the player has to start the mission again. Missions also feature optional objectives that are not critical but add to the player's overall completion score. Some objectives require the player to use numerous high-tech gadgets. For example, a device called Datathief allows the player to hack into electronic devices, while another called Loctopus can be used to open locked doors. Stealth is an important element of the gameplay, as the player is often given the freedom to kill enemies without being detected by sneaking up behind them. Unlike the original Perfect Dark, every mission contains a single checkpoint at which the player may restart if Joanna is killed or loses beyond that checkpoint. However, checkpoints are progressively removed at higher difficulty settings. There are four difficulty settings on which a mission can be played: Agent, Secret Agent, Perfect Agent, and an extra one called Dark Agent, which becomes available once the player completes the entire game on Perfect Agent. As the player plays on higher difficulties, the game adds more objectives and makes enemies tougher to increase the challenge.

The game also provides a co-operative mode where two players may play through the game's campaign together via split screen, system link, or through the Xbox Live online service. In co-operative mode, the missions are slightly altered to suit both players. For instance, some doors may require two players to open them. Additionally, in certain missions, the second player can occasionally start far away from the main player and takes over an allied character that is computer-controlled in the single player campaign. The respawn procedure is also altered substantially, as if one player dies, the other has to find and revive the partner's corpse to bring it back to life.

=== Multiplayer ===
In addition to the campaign mode, Perfect Dark Zero features a multiplayer mode where a maximum of 32 players may compete in numerous types of deathmatch and objective-based games via split screen, system link, or Xbox Live. There are two main modes with their own options: DeathMatch and DarkOps. DeathMatch is a standard game type where players spawn in rooms, collect weapons that are available on the map, and continue to the actual map. The overall objective of the game is determined by the scenario being played. Scenarios range from Killcount or Team Killcount, where the goal is to kill as many opposing players as possible, to objective-based games such as Capture the Flag and Territorial Gains. DarkOps is a slower-paced and team-only game type where weapons must be purchased from a player's stock of credits and credits are earned by killing enemies and completing objectives. Scenarios in this mode include Eradication, where the last team with any members left alive wins; Infection, where players score points by either infecting others or surviving infection; Sabotage, where the team that causes the most damage to the other team's property wins; and Onslaught, where one team must defend a base while the other has to attack it.

Players can either choose to play a ranked Deathmatch or DarkOps, where they will be matched with other players using a system called TrueSkill Matchmaking, or they may choose a player match where they can choose their game from a list of player-hosted games. Like the original Perfect Dark, these games can be highly customized and can also include computer game bots. Features such as their difficulty and behavior can be changed to match player preference. For example, the Judge bot always attacks leading players with the highest kills score. Players can also issue commands to them as long as they are on their respective team, such as follow or hold position, and set waypoints for them to walk to. The game includes by default six different maps and each has two variants; the only change is the placement of the bases. Most of the maps are large ones, ideal for 32 players at once, with small variants for 4-16 player games.

== Plot ==
Perfect Dark Zero is set in an alternate 2020, where a large percentage of the world is controlled by corporations. The most notable of these are dataDyne, headed by Zhang Li, and the Carrington Institute, headed by Daniel Carrington. The player is cast as Joanna Dark, a bounty hunter working with her father Jack and computer hacker Chandra Sekhar. The team is after Nathan Zeigler, an independent researcher who has been captured by a Hong Kong triad leader named Killian. Joanna and her father rescue Zeigler, but Killian manages to escape. Zeigler explains that Killian was trying to obtain his research, which contains information about a dangerous weapon. As Zeigler refuses to go anywhere without his research, Joanna is sent to retrieve it from a case in a nearby safe house. Zeigler then takes a device called a neurodrive from the case and uses it to implant his research data into Jack's mind. Before dying to his injuries, which were inflicted by Killian, Zeigler tells Joanna and her father that they must find a scientist named Dr. Eustace Caroll.

While trying to escape, Joanna and Jack are attacked by a dataDyne assault team assisted by Killian in a dropship. Joanna manages to kill Killian and escape with Chandra, but Jack is captured by dataDyne. Joanna learns that her father has been taken to a mansion in China, where Zhang Li lives. Joanna infiltrates the mansion and finds her father in a cell. He has been tortured, and begins speaking gibberish to her, an aftereffect of the neurodrive. The pair fight their way out of the complex, but their extraction is interrupted by Zhang Li's daughter, Mai Hem, who kills Jack before Joanna escapes in a hovercraft. Joanna and Chandra decide to pursue Zeigler's lead and seek out Dr. Caroll, who works aboard a research platform on the Pacific Ocean. Upon meeting with Joanna, Dr. Caroll uses a neurodrive to extract Zeigler's data from Joanna's memory, which she gained when she rescued her father. Chandra then shoots Dr. Caroll, revealing that she decided to join dataDyne because Zhang Li had made her a large offer. A team of Carrington Institute agents saves Joanna, but Chandra ultimately escapes with the data.

When Joanna agrees to join the Carrington Institute to stop dataDyne, Carrington explains that Zeigler had been working on an algorithm capable of decoding extraterrestrial glyphs at a dig site in South America. Traveling to Peru, Joanna learns that the glyphs are leading dataDyne to search for an ancient artefact which acts as a power source for the Graal, a device which endows individuals with superhuman powers. Joanna plants a tracking device on the artefact before sneaking aboard a dataDyne dropship. The dropship takes her to Africa, where Zhang Li has located the Graal buried under the African sands. As the Carrington Institute starts an offensive on dataDyne, Joanna rescues several Carrington Institute agents before avenging her father's death by killing Mai Hem. She then infiltrates an arena and faces off against Zhang Li, who dispatches Chandra after using the Graal. After Joanna defeats Zhang Li in a final battle, Carrington commends her efforts, saying she did "Perfect".

== Development ==
Development of Perfect Dark Zero began on the GameCube with a very small team of roughly ten people. At the time, Nintendo had a 49% stake in Rare, making the company a Nintendo second-party developer. According to lead designer Chris Tilston, "it was basically prototyping, finding out where we could go and how we could get there". When Rare was purchased by Microsoft in 2002, the project was transferred to the Xbox console and the game's multiplayer mode was redesigned for Xbox Live online play. Tilston revealed that at one point they got to 50 players online simultaneously, but the graphics "just couldn't handle it". Since the initial version of the game pushed the original Xbox hardware "pretty hard", the project was ultimately transferred to the Xbox successor, the Xbox 360. Tilston revealed that the original Xbox version was "about 12 months away" from completion when the shift occurred.

Initially, the game had a heavy anime style and Joanna Dark received many alterations throughout the development process. Lead Art Director Wil Overton explained that they "wanted to bring her back in line with the way Rare do things. [...] We sorta wanted to stylize her up a bit and make her more iconic". However, the designers ultimately decided to tone down the styling of the game a bit. The Xbox 360 gave the developers more possibilities to include what they always wanted and allowed them to create the game's co-operative mode, which was one of the first that could be played via Xbox Live. Designing the co-operative mode over Xbox Live was very challenging for the developers. According to Duncan Botwood, who was responsible for most of the multiplayer, "it was quite an effort to put it in, to be honest. You have to cater for a number of eventualities you just don't get normally. We think we pulled it off, and because we pulled it off, other people might feel inspired to put the effort in, and we think that's a good thing".

Perfect Dark Zero is also one of the first games that uses Havok's HydraCore physics engine, which was specifically designed for multi-core video game systems like the Xbox 360. The game's renderer engine employs more advanced graphic technologies than was possible in the previous console generation, including parallax mapping, ambient occlusion, subsurface scattering, and high dynamic range. The soundtrack of the game was primarily composed by David Clynick, who worked with Grant Kirkhope on the original Nintendo 64 game's score. New York-based group MorissonPoe contributed two songs to the score—the opening theme song "Glitter Girl (Evil Side)" and the closing credits theme "Pearl Necklace"—while DJs Kepi and Kat composed the game's nightclub theme.

The cover mode was designed to enhance the stealth aspect of the game and the third-person perspective was needed to allow players to see the character they were playing. The idea of bringing the game into a total third-person perspective was rejected as the shooting "works better" in first-person view, explained Tilston. Developers decided not to include a jumping function since they felt it goes against the nature of the genre. Botwood pointed out that it can "look damn stupid when you see other players doing it". For this reason, the team implemented moves such as climbing obstacles or, more specifically, the combat roll, which makes players harder to hit since it breaks the game's auto-aim lock. The transition between first and third-person view with some moves took a lot of work so that they did not become disorientating. A first-person roll was implemented at one time, but it was ultimately dropped.

Because Perfect Dark Zero was intended to be an Xbox 360 launch title, the last stage of development was very challenging and several features had to be canceled so that the game could meet the launch deadline. The number of players in multiplayer matches had to be reduced from 50 to 32, and a "dataDyne TV" mode that would have allowed players to upload and watch multiplayer matches over Xbox Live was eventually rejected. Final development for the Xbox 360 was very rushed. The order was given to produce the discs five days before the Microsoft certification was complete. Rare later stated they felt very confident they would pass, but it was a significant risk producing 700,000 disks if a bug turned up. According to Botwood, "very few people believed we could make launch, but everything came together in time and it was out there for day one".

The actual development of the game took five years overall to complete and spanned three platforms: the GameCube, the Microsoft Xbox and the Xbox 360. Tilston remarked that, throughout the course of development, the team noticed how the video game industry had evolved as computing and graphics power increased, and how earlier games like GoldenEye 007 and Donkey Kong Country where their development costs were minimal could easily be profitable with a few programmers. Tilston also revealed that the team behind Perfect Dark Zero was composed of roughly 25 people for most of the project, which was "ridiculously" small compared to Xbox 360 generation standards where there are 100 or 200 people working on a team. Despite this, Perfect Dark Zero, from a development cost, made four times its money back.

== Marketing and release ==
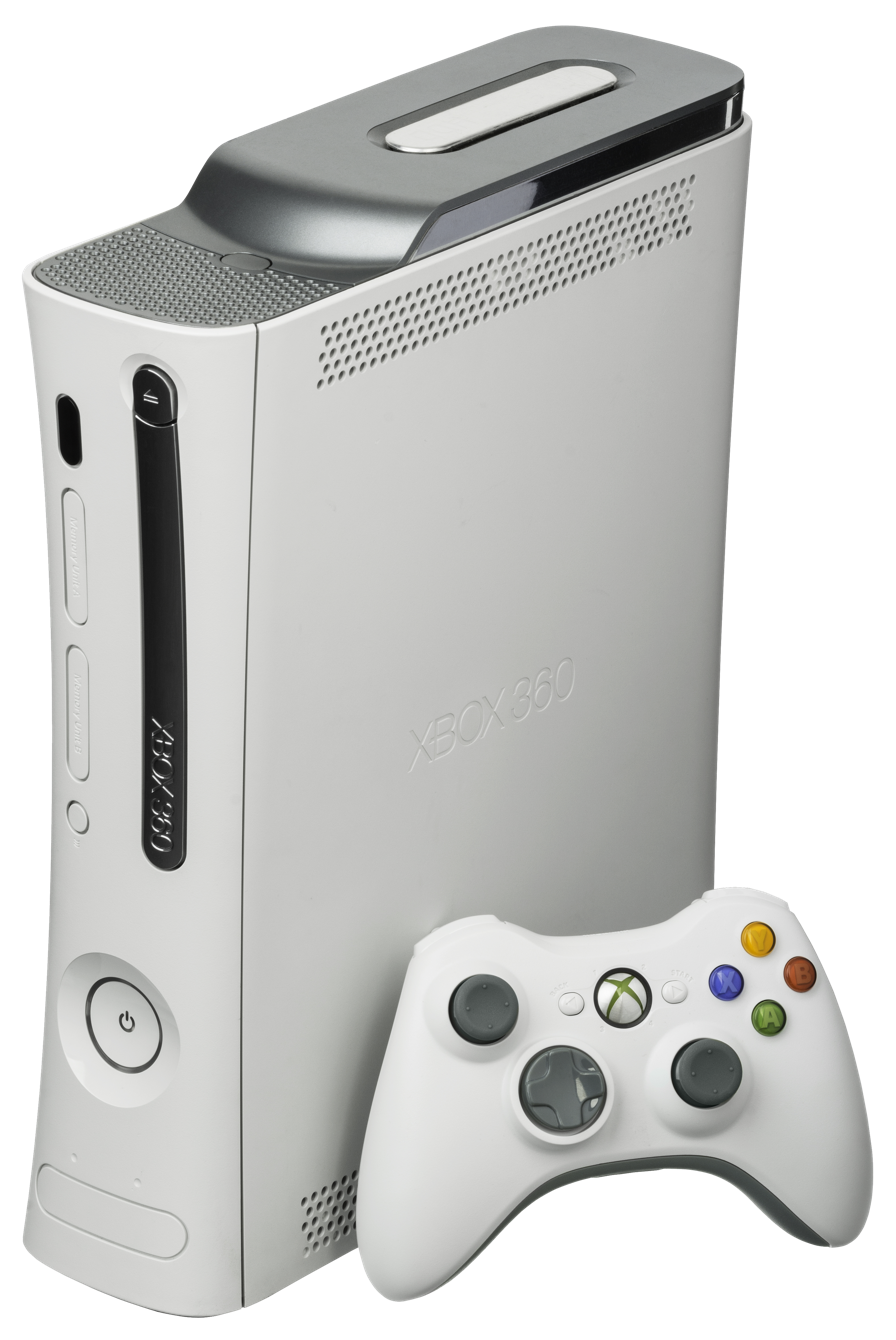
Perfect Dark Zero was released as a launch title for the Xbox 360.

Perfect Dark Zero was first hinted at Nintendo Space World in August 2000, where a brief demo showed a 3D real-time render of Joanna Dark. Some reports further suggested the development of the game with Rare applying to trademark the names "After Dark", "Perfect Dark Evolution" and the phrase "Shot in the Dark". At E3 2001, Nintendo advertised the title "Perfect Dark Zero" on a list of upcoming GameCube releases, but the list was quickly removed. In January 2002, it was reported that Perfect Dark Zero was delayed until at least 2004 due to internal team problems at Rare. When Rare was purchased by Microsoft in September 2002, several images of Joanna Dark were released, but few other official announcements were made in the following years.

In May 2005, one of the rewards in the OurColony viral marketing campaign for the Xbox 360 console was a new image of Joanna Dark. At the official unveiling of the Xbox 360, it was announced that Perfect Dark Zero would be a launch title for the new system in the fall of 2005. A demo was shown at E3 2005 shortly afterwards. Prior to its release, Microsoft arranged a deal with Tor Books to produce novels set in the Perfect Dark universe. A six-issue comic book series written by Eric Trautmann and illustrated by Cold FuZion Studios was also announced. Around the same time, Joanna Dark made an appearance on the cover of FHM magazine. An official soundtrack album featuring a selection of music from the game was produced by Nile Rodgers and released on November 8, 2005 through Sumthing Else Music Works.

Perfect Dark Zero was first released in North America on November 22, 2005. The game was playable at the Xbox 360 Zero Hour Launch event, alongside Rare's Kameo and Activision's Call of Duty 2. The European release followed on December 2, 2005, while the Japanese version was released on December 10, 2005. In Europe, Microsoft organized a party by simulating an apartment as Joanna's home, where several journalists could play the Xbox 360. During the Japanese launch weekend, Perfect Dark Zero became the second best-selling Xbox 360 game with roughly 15,000 units sold, behind Namco's Ridge Racer 6. Standard and limited collector's editions of the game were made available for purchase. The collector's edition included a disc with behind-the-scenes content, a black metal game case, a special edition comic booklet that sets the scene for the game, and one of nine holographic collectible cards. As of October 2006, Perfect Dark Zero had sold more than one million copies worldwide, eventually joining Microsoft's "Platinum Hits" game selection.

In 2015, Perfect Dark Zero was released as a backward-compatible game for the Xbox One and included in the Rare Replay compilation. In 2019, the game was enhanced for the Xbox One with higher resolutions, faster frame rates, and improved textures.

=== Downloadable content ===
When the game was released, new multiplayer scenarios and a Counter-Operative mode similar to that of the original Perfect Dark were originally intended to be released as downloadable content. Game designer Duncan Botwood later clarified that it was unlikely to happen due to technical issues. According to him, "It would have required much groundwork to be laid in the core AI code, which meant that it was unlikely to be available as downloadable content post-release". He also remarked that the Counter-Operative mode was planned during the development of the game, but the idea was ultimately discarded due to the pressure to cut planned content. In May 2006, an auto-update was made available on Xbox Live, responsible for fixing some bugs and adding new multiplayer options to the game. The bug fixes included code to prevent an ongoing problem where players could walk through the air, an issue where some weapons could make use of rapid fire, and a map-exiting glitch, among others. The new multiplayer options provided seven new bot types and the ability to use bots in DarkOps matches, since bots had only one AI variant and were only available in DeathMatch scenarios when the game was released.

A playable demo of the game was made freely available on the Xbox Live Marketplace shortly afterwards. The demo included one campaign mission that could be played in solo mode or co-operatively, and a new multiplayer map. A multiplayer map pack, called Perfect Dark Zero Map Pack One, was released on June 7, 2006, containing the demo's new multiplayer map as well as three other new maps to add to the game's original six. Unlike the original maps, the new maps only have one variant instead of two. On October 31, 2006, Rare revealed a special platinum edition of Perfect Dark Zero, featuring the first map pack and two additional maps as extras. The two new maps were later released for free in a pack called Perfect Dark Zero Map Pack Two. These maps are updated versions of the Felicity and Ruins maps from the original Perfect Dark. The pack was released on November 1, 2006 for Gold Members and on November 8, 2006 for Silver Members.

== Reception ==
Reception

Aggregate score
Aggregator	Score
Metacritic	81/100

Review scores
Publication	Score
1Up.com	A
Edge	7/10
Eurogamer	7/10
Game Informer	7/10
GameSpot	9.0/10
GameSpy	4/5
GameTrailers	9/10
GameZone	9/10
IGN	8.4/10
GameCritics	6/10

Perfect Dark Zero received generally positive reviews from critics. Writing for GameSpot, Greg Kasavin felt that Perfect Dark Zero "champions the Xbox 360 with its excellent assortment of single and multiplayer game types, as well as its incredible good looks and dynamic, intense action". He concluded that the game "delivers just about everything you could hope for from a first-person shooter". Charles Onyett of IGN praised the game's replay value, but also criticised single-player aspects such as the weak artificial intelligence of enemies, commenting that "they never display any advanced assault tactics".

The graphics were highlighted positively. Kasavin was impressed with the amount of lighting and motion blur effects, and noted that the "excellent character animation helps make the guns feel as powerful as they look". Bryn Williams of GameSpy considered the graphics as a "stunning look at what the 360 hardware is capable of", but also admitted that the animation "is a little too slow and sometimes creates an unwelcome sense of cartoonishness". IGN credited the attractive gun models, explosions, and sprawling vistas, but felt that some areas such as the South American Ruins can unnecessarily look too shiny. The game's audio was said to feature "heavy-hitting weapon effects [and] fantastic, moody soundtrack that gives each mission its own pulsing rhythms".

The game's weapons were very well received. Edge praised their weight, stating that each weapon encourages strategic play with their secondary functions. Critics generally agreed that the roll and cover system worked well and that they did not feel overpowered, but some criticised the fact that players need to be in a specific spot to use the cover mode. Reviewers considered the story and voice acting to be weak. IGN said that it is almost impossible not to notice how "laughably bad it is", and that many plot twists are presented then never resolved, but also admitted that it does not really factor into the gameplay. GameCritics reviewer Mike Bracken commented: "It's always sad when there's voice acting in a game and I find myself being embarrassed for the voice actors". Nevertheless, GameSpot added that the weapon sound effects and musical score "easily drown this out".

Publications judged the co-op aspect of the game well. Kristan Reed of Eurogamer praised the fact that the missions were "designed with co-op in mind". He noted that, for example, the third level "has Joanna providing cover fire for her father Jack as he hops from one point of the level to the next. In the single player campaign Jack's [computer-controlled], but co-op lets you take direct control of his actions, making the experience a much more engaging affair all-round". Multiplayer matches of Perfect Dark Zero were widely well received. GameSpot stated that "the excellent weapon selection, flexibility of options, high-quality maps, and smooth online performance ... make for a rock-solid competitive shooter". IGN stated similar pros, calling it "enormous". 1Up.com reviewer Che Chou also praised the multiplayer, but observed that "constantly roll-dodging to avoid enemy fire at close range [...] combined with the exceptionally slow movement speed of your character [...] can occasionally be highly frustrating for beginners".

Despite solid reviews, numerous publications remarked that Perfect Dark Zero did not meet expectations. According to GameCritics, "it took Rare a whole console generation to do it [...] and the wait wasn't really worth it". Game Informer found the game underwhelming, reviewing it under the tagline "Don't believe the hype". In a positive review, GameSpy praised Perfect Dark Zero for doing many things well, but acknowledge that it was not a killer-app. Edge said that the game "falls short", especially when compared to Halo: Combat Evolved, a successful first-person shooter that was released as a launch title for the original Xbox. At the 2005 Spike Video Game Awards, Perfect Dark Zero was nominated for Best Original Score and Best First Person Action, while Joanna Dark was nominated for Cyber Vixen of the Year. At IGN's Best of 2005 awards, Perfect Dark Zero won Best Offline Multiplayer Game and Best Xbox Live Game in the Xbox 360 categories, and was nominated for Best First-Person Shooter, also in the Xbox 360 categories. Similarly, at GameSpot's Best of 2005 awards, the game was nominated for Best Original Music, Best Multiplayer Game, Best Shooter, and Best Xbox 360 Game.
