= Perfect Dark =

2000 Nintendo 64 video game

- North American box art
- Developer: Rare
- Publisher: Rare
- Designers: Duncan Botwood; David Doak
- Programmer: Mark Edmonds
- Composers: Grant Kirkhope; Graeme Norgate; David Clynick
- Series: Perfect Dark
- Platform: Nintendo 64
- Release: NA: 22 May 2000; EU: 30 June 2000
- Genres: First-person shooter, stealth
- Modes: Single-player, multiplayer

Perfect Dark is a 2000 first-person shooter game developed and published by Rare for the Nintendo 64. The first game of the Perfect Dark series, it follows Joanna Dark, an agent of the Carrington Institute research centre, as she attempts to stop an extraterrestrial conspiracy by rival corporation dataDyne. The game features a campaign mode where the player must complete a series of levels to progress through the story, as well as a range of multiplayer options, including a co-operative mode and traditional deathmatch settings with computer-controlled bots.

As a spiritual successor to Rare's 1997 first-person shooter GoldenEye 007, Perfect Dark shares many features with its predecessor and runs on an upgraded version of its game engine. GoldenEye 007 director Martin Hollis led the game's production for the first fourteen months of its near three-year development cycle before he left Rare to pursue other interests. The game is one of the most technically advanced titles for the Nintendo 64 and requires an Expansion Pak to access the campaign mode and most of the multiplayer features. Shortly before the game's release, a feature that would have allowed players to place a photograph of their choice onto the face of their multiplayer character was cut due to sensitivity issues surrounding the ability for players to attack images of real people.

Upon release, Perfect Dark received critical acclaim and sold relatively well, eventually joining Nintendo's "Player's Choice" game selection. Critics widely praised its graphics, artificial intelligence, and number of multiplayer options, but some criticised its inconsistent frame rate. The game received the BAFTA Interactive Entertainment Moving Images Award for 2000 and the Golden Satellite Award for Best Interactive Product in 2001. The game is occasionally cited as one of the greatest games of all time. It is supplemented by a Game Boy Color counterpart, which allows some gameplay options to alternatively be unlocked via a Transfer Pak. A remaster, also titled Perfect Dark, featuring enhanced graphics and online multiplayer, was released for the Xbox 360 in 2010. The game was re-released on the Nintendo Classics service in 2024.

== Gameplay ==
Perfect Dark is a first-person shooter where players complete levels to unlock content and progress through the game's storyline. Players maneuver their character from a first-person perspective and have the ability to lean left or right, look up or down, crouch, crawl, and drop from most ledges; there is no jump ability. Interaction with the environment is via a single button, which can activate computers, operate lifts, and open doors. Players can carry an unlimited number of weapons, ranging from handguns to assault rifles, rocket launchers, a shotgun, a sniper rifle, and combat knives. Besides their primary mode of fire, weapons have a secondary function that enables an alternate fire mode or grants players special abilities. For example, the secondary function of the K7 Avenger assault rifle detects threats like explosive devices. Most weapons have a finite magazine and must be reloaded after a certain number of shots. Some can be used in duplicate, one in each hand.

Players have a certain amount of health, which decreases when attacked by opponents. Although the game does not feature health recovery items, players can pick up shields that protect them with a secondary health bar. Players and opponents can disarm each other at close range, and players may use this feature to steal weapons or knock foes unconscious. Damage taken during combat is location-based, with a shot to the torso causing more damage than a shot to a limb. A number of tutorials and training activities can be taken in the game's home level. The most notable of these is the shooting range, where players can test their proficiency with the game's weapons in individual challenges. In addition to training activities, players can find information about the game's locations and characters, which are gradually unlocked as they complete levels.

=== Campaign ===
In this level, the player is aiming at an opponent. The game's HUD at the bottom right corner shows the player's remaining ammunition and the weapon's selected function.

Perfect Dark features a campaign mode where a single player controls the game's protagonist, Joanna Dark, through a series of levels collected together into missions. In each level, the player must complete a set of objectives while opponents controlled by the game's artificial intelligence try to hinder the player's progress. Objectives generally require the recovery and use of high-tech gadgets like night-vision goggles or door decoders. The player has freedom as to how to approach encounters, and many objectives can be completed in a nonlinear order. Stealth is an important element of the gameplay because the player can kill opponents without being seen or remain undetected by using disguises. If Joanna fails an objective or her health is fully depleted, the player must start the level again from the beginning.

Each level can be played on three distinct difficulty settings. These affect aspects such as the number of objectives that must be completed, damage taken from opponents, the effectiveness of the game's optional aiming assistance, and the availability of ammunition and protective shields. Four bonus levels may be unlocked by completing the campaign on each difficulty setting and all the challenges in the firing range. Some of these bonus levels allow the player to assume the role of a different character. If all the levels have been completed on the highest difficulty, an additional setting becomes available, allowing the player to customise various aspects of the game's opponents, such as their health, aiming accuracy, and the damage they inflict. The player may unlock cheats by completing levels within a certain time limit.

The campaign includes a co-operative mode, allowing either two players or one player and up to four computer-controlled bots, to tackle a level together. If two players play, the game splits the screen horizontally or vertically. Options such as friendly fire can be disabled, and only one player is required to survive a level. A "Counter-Operative" mode is included, allowing one player to play a level as Joanna while another takes the role of an opponent attempting to stop her. The player-controlled opponent has less health than Joanna but will reappear as another opponent when defeated. The opposing player may choose to take control of another opponent at any time by swallowing a suicide pill.

=== Multiplayer ===
Perfect Dark features a multiplayer mode where up to four players and eight computer-controlled bots can compete against each other in different arenas. A split-screen is used for multiple players. Players start a game unarmed and with a certain amount of health. Weapons and ammunition are placed around the arena in preset positions. Once a player is killed, they are regenerated unarmed elsewhere in the arena. The objective of each game is determined by the scenario being played. Scenarios range from the traditional deathmatch mode, where players score points by killing opponents, to objective-based modes such as Capture the Flag or King of the Hill.

Aspects of a multiplayer game can be highly customised, including the chosen arena, the winning conditions, and the ability to choose what weapons and items appear in the arena. Players can be grouped into teams or compete individually, and they can optionally be shown coloured according to their team. The appearance, team affiliation, skill level and pre-set behaviours of each computer-controlled bot can be customised. Pre-set behaviours range from them pursuing the highest-scoring player to exclusively chasing the player who killed them last. Other behaviours restrict bots to only attack players using fists and disarming moves. On higher skill levels, bots perform actions at a superhuman level. Players may issue commands to bots of their team to perform certain tasks. For example, a player can order an allied bot to defend an area or attack a designated opponent.

The multiplayer mode includes 30 pre-set challenges against bots that may be tackled by one or more players. These challenges cover a variety of game types, weapon arrangements, and level setups. By completing challenges, additional features such as new weapons, player models, and bot behaviours are unlocked. At the end of a match, the overall results are shown, alongside information about the individual players' performance. The game keeps track of player statistics such as damage dealt and distance travelled and awards players with medals based on how well they performed. Players are ranked according to their performance; the better the performance, the higher the grade. The player's overall progress, multiplayer setups, and character profiles can be saved to the Nintendo 64 game cartridge or a Controller Pak. The game also supports the Rumble Pak.

== Plot ==
In 2023, there is an interstellar war between two alien races: the Maians, who resemble the archetypal Grey alien, and the Skedar, reptile-like wicked creatures who use a cloaking device to appear human. On Earth, there is an ongoing rivalry between two companies: the Carrington Institute, a research center founded by Daniel Carrington that secretly operates an espionage group in league with the Maians; and dataDyne, a defense contractor corporation headed by Cassandra de Vries. In exchange for creating an AI with code-breaking abilities to access an ancient alien spacecraft at the bottom of the Pacific Ocean, the Skedar agree to supply dataDyne with enough alien technology to become the biggest corporation on Earth.

Joanna Dark is an agent of the Carrington Institute whose flawless scores in training have earned her the nickname "Perfect Dark". On her first mission, she is sent to extract a defector known as Dr. Caroll from a dataDyne laboratory. Dr. Caroll is revealed to be the AI created by dataDyne and is worried about the mission for which it had been designed. After the extraction, Carrington is held captive at his private villa by dataDyne soldiers. When Joanna rescues him, she is informed that Dr. Caroll has been taken to a dataDyne front in Chicago. There, Joanna learns that Cassandra, NSA director Trent Easton, and a mysterious man known as Mr. Blonde plan to kidnap the President of the United States to get access to a deep sea research vessel called the Pelagic II. Although the President is in danger, Carrington alerts Joanna that a Maian craft was shot down near Area 51 and sends her to rescue a Maian protector named Elvis.

Because the President of the United States refuses to loan dataDyne the Pelagic II, the NSA sends a strike team to kill and replace him with a dataDyne-grown clone. The strike team invades the air base from which the Air Force One will depart. When Joanna foils this strike, the NSA and a group of cloaked Skedar take over the plane itself, which crashes after Joanna attempts to detach a craft attached to it. Having survived the crash, Joanna eliminates the President's clone and rescues the real President. Trent's incompetence angers Mr. Blonde, who kills him after disabling his cloaking device. With no other options, dataDyne hijacks the Pelagic II to reach the ancient spacecraft. However, unbeknownst to dataDyne, the spacecraft contains a powerful weapon capable of destroying a planet, and the Skedar intend to test it on Earth before using it against the Maian homeworld.

Joanna and Elvis follow dataDyne to the ancient spacecraft, where they find a reprogrammed Dr. Caroll cracking the weapon. Joanna replaces its current personality with a backup of the original, and the restored Dr. Caroll sets the weapon to self-destruct. As Carrington and Joanna prepare for a Presidential reception, the Skedar assault the Carrington Institute and capture Joanna. In space, aboard an alien spaceship on course to the Skedar homeworld, Joanna finds herself in a holding cell with Cassandra. Feeling that she has been used, Cassandra redeems herself by making a distraction and sacrificing herself, freeing Joanna and therefore giving herself a chance for revenge. With the help of Elvis, Joanna takes control of the spaceship and lands on the Skedar homeworld, where she ultimately defeats the Skedar leader, leaving the Skedar in disarray. The game ends with Elvis and Joanna leaving the planet just prior to an orbital bombardment from the Maian navy.

== Development ==
=== Concept and design ===
Perfect Dark was developed by Rare and originally directed by Martin Hollis as a spiritual successor to the company's 1997 first-person shooter GoldenEye 007. Shortly after GoldenEye 007 was released, Rare was planning to work on a game based on the film Tomorrow Never Dies, but the company was outbid by Electronic Arts, which would release their video game adaptation in 1999. The result did not upset the developers, who felt they had already spent too much time immersed in the James Bond universe. Working titles for the new project included "Covert Ops" and "Alien Intelligence" before the title "Perfect Dark" was decided on. The word "Dark" was chosen for its association with the game's bleak focus on killing. Hollis noted naming similarities to the 2006 first-person shooter Black by Criterion Games: "Game developers just like black, nihilism, dystopian futures, the number zero, infinity, spheres, perfection—all that kind of stuff". The double slash symbol in the game's logo was inspired by the Japanese writing system, while the bad grammar of the phrase "Perfect Dark" partially alludes to Hollis' affection for the way Japanese developers use English words in their own games and products.

The game's science fiction setting was chosen due to the developers' interest in the genre. The X-Files television series inspired the incorporation of a gray alien character and the premise of aliens being investigated. Other influences on the setting, theme, and plot include conspiracy theories and works such as the Ghost in the Shell manga, Elektra comic books, the films Blade Runner and Judge Dredd, and the writing of author Philip K. Dick. Hollis and designer David Doak picked architectural and impressive sci-fi dystopian settings; the plot was then constructed around these locations. For example, the first level takes place in a skyscraper that lead artist Karl Hilton had always wanted to build and features realistic environments like service stairs and an exterior area that can be explored. Although the game features a new fictional universe, it was still envisioned as a spy shooter like GoldenEye 007. The developers' desires to expand upon its stealth mechanics, along with their admiration for the 1998 stealth game Metal Gear Solid, led to the creation of gadgets such as the CamSpy and the data uplink device.

The decision to make the central character a woman was part of Hollis' belief that there should be more games starring women, considering the fact that GoldenEye 007 already starred a man. To this end, the team created Joanna Dark, influenced by a number of fictional heroines: Kim Kimberly from the 1983 interactive fiction game Snowball, the seductive spy Agent X-27 in the 1931 film Dishonored, the eponymous femme fatale of the 1990 film La Femme Nikita, and FBI agent Dana Scully from The X-Files. The name of the in-game company dataDyne was inspired by Yoyodyne from the 1965 novella The Crying of Lot 49 by Thomas Pynchon. The layout of the Air Force One level was inspired by the 1997 film of the same name because it was the only reference material the team had. In the game's Counter-Operative mode, the idea that the opposing player can take control of another opponent at any time was inspired by the 1999 film The Matrix, in which agents can reappear as another person in the film's simulated reality.

=== Production ===
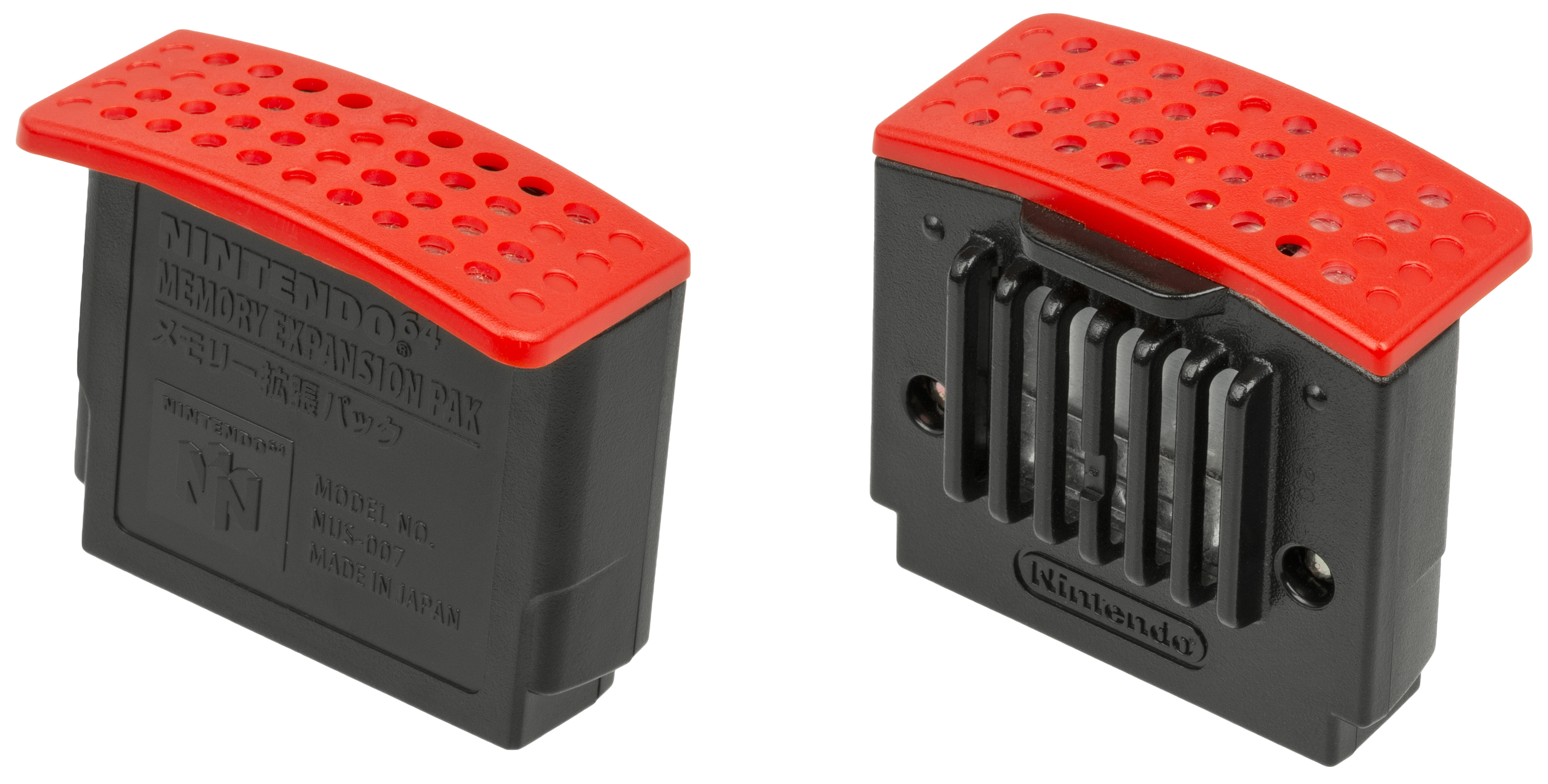
The Expansion Pak is required to access the game's campaign and most of the multiplayer features.

When production of the game started, the developers upgraded the GoldenEye 007 game engine with new features and enhancements such as real-time lighting and support for bigger environments and more textures. According to Rare, only 30% of the original engine remained, providing a basic framework to construct levels and animate characters. A new movement system was constructed, allowing players to fall off edges. Other incremental improvements included better shattering glass effects, which would allow players to shoot out objects such as bottles of wine, and the inclusion of computer-controlled bots in multiplayer matches. The artificial intelligence was improved so that opponents could work as a team and draw a secondary weapon when disarmed. Death cries and more elaborate gore effects, which allow gunshots to disperse and stain enemies' blood onto nearby walls and objects, were also added.

Originally, Hollis hoped that the difference between light and dark would be a significant feature of the gameplay, and the title was intended to reflect this focus. A flashlight was implemented by software engineer Steve Ellis, who had been responsible for much of the multiplayer mode of GoldenEye 007, but was ultimately not included in the game due to limitations of the Nintendo 64 hardware. In 2006, Hollis remarked that such aims were overambitious, stating that "even today, you can see game developers struggle to make light and dark foundational from a gameplay perspective". Nevertheless, the game features more advanced lighting than its predecessor. For example, lights can be shot out to create darkened areas, gunfire and explosions illuminate rooms dynamically, and the player can use infrared or night-vision goggles.

Hollis was involved with Perfect Dark for the first 14 months of its nearly three-year development cycle, during which progress was unsatisfactory. As he explained, "each of us was asking for more than the other could give. This situation ended with my departure, and with very deep regret I was unable to see Perfect Dark to completion". Hollis' decision came after his four-year contract with Rare was about to expire, which he chose not to renew as he wanted to pursue other interests. Shortly after his exit in September 1998, four additional members—Doak, Hilton, Ellis and composer Graeme Norgate—left Rare to form Free Radical Design, partially because they were unsatisfied with the working environment. This resulted in a loss of half of the workforce and led Rare to assign more people to the team remaining on the project, which eventually became three times bigger than GoldenEye 007's. Programmer Mark Edmonds was promoted to team leader because of his knowledge of the game engine. Although the story and ideas for the game were kept intact, the new team contributed so much to development that it was seen as a fresh start. The team worked in a very isolated and free environment and did not have a production manager, a schedule, meetings, commercial pressure, or any sort of deadlines. According to artist Brett Jones: "People would just do things they thought were cool and would work".

In spring 1999, Rare moved its headquarters from a country farmhouse in Twycross, Leicestershire, to its current multi-million office complex. Although the locations are a few minutes away from each other, the move caused minor disruptions for some. Rare installed an in-house motion capture studio, which was used to capture hit animations and full walk cycles. Game designer Duncan Botwood wore a pair of heels to portray Joanna Dark in some sessions, but motion capture artist Laurie Sage performed most of her moves. Many of the game opponents were based on members of the development team, who also performed the motion capture required for their animation. Numerous secrets were added to the game to fuel the exploration efforts of players, including a piece of cheese hidden in every level. These were deliberately placed by one of the level editors as a graphical oddity for the player's confusion. The game has two hidden passwords: one found by picking up a necklace in one level and another by reaching the highest rank in the multiplayer mode. Rare had originally intended these details to access password-protected sections of promotional websites and use them for an alternate reality game.

As developers kept adding features, the game ended up using all the extra memory on their debug consoles and became too big to fit into the Nintendo 64's standard 4 MB of random-access memory (RAM). Because the developers were unable to optimise it, they made use of the Nintendo 64 Expansion Pak, which increases the Nintendo 64's RAM from 4 MB to 8 MB. Although the Expansion Pak is required to access the game's campaign and most of the multiplayer features, a limited subset of deathmatch options are available without the device—around 35% of the game is playable without an Expansion Pak, as estimated on the game's instruction booklet. The Expansion Pak allows the game to optionally be played in a 480i "high-resolution" mode. The Counter-Operative mode proved to be difficult to implement and led the game to be delayed. The iterative nature of the game's development led Hollis to describe the ultimate number of multiplayer options as "a vast array of features I [had] never planned".

Cut from the game was a feature that allowed players to place a photograph of their choice onto the face of their multiplayer character. The photos would have been taken by the Game Boy Camera accessory and directly transferred to the game via a Nintendo 64 Transfer Pak. They could then be cropped or manipulated with an in-game editor and mapped onto the polygonal head of a multiplayer character. The photos could also be saved to the game cartridge or a Controller Pak for cross-game sharing. Although Rare's Nintendo-side producer Ken Lobb originally stated that the feature was removed due to technical difficulties, the actual reason was revealed to be sensitive issues surrounding the ability for players to attack images of real people. Rare's decision came after then-recent attacks such as the Columbine High School massacre, when new censorship laws were being introduced in the United States.

The soundtrack was primarily composed by Grant Kirkhope, who replaced Norgate after his departure. Writing sci-fi music was a new and enjoyable experience for Kirkhope, as he had mainly worked on Banjo-Kazooie at the time. While he took inspiration from Blade Runner and the whistling sound of "The X-Files" theme song, he reused much of Norgate's sample set, especially peculiar sci-fi noises he had created. One of Norgate's few contributions to the final Perfect Dark score was the theme of the first level. A third composer, David Clynick, composed the game's cinematic sequence while Kirkhope was working on Donkey Kong 64 and Banjo-Tooie. The game supports 16x9 widescreen and Dolby surround sound, and features voice acting for all in-game and cutscene dialogue. Nintendo wanted an American actress to voice Joanna Dark, but the role ultimately went to British composer Eveline Fischer. Because Perfect Dark features more than 45 minutes of voiced cutscenes, the game was shipped in a 32 MB cartridge.

== Marketing and release ==
While the localised title of "Red and Black" was ultimately dropped, Japanese advertisements and box art still kept its dual colour theme.

After a follow-up to GoldenEye 007 featuring an original character was confirmed to be in development in early 1998, Perfect Dark was formally presented as Nintendo's lead game at E3 1998 in Atlanta, Georgia. Originally scheduled for a release in summer 1999 and later in December 1999, Perfect Dark was heavily trailed in video game magazines, with Nintendo Official Magazine predicting that it would be "the best shooting game this century". A working version of the game appeared at the European Computer Trade Show in September 1998; N64 Magazine described the preview as having "the kind of attention to detail that had everyone who saw [it] drooling". A more complete version was presented at E3 in May 1999, where the game's compatibility with the Game Boy Camera was announced, and at Nintendo Space World in August 1999, alongside Rare's Donkey Kong 64 and Jet Force Gemini. Shortly before release, Rare unveiled a website for the in-game company dataDyne to promote interest in the game's storyline. The game had a marketing budget of $10 million.

Perfect Dark was first released in North America on 22 May 2000. Nintendo arranged a number of publicity stunts, including hiring model Michele Merkin, who appeared as Joanna Dark in commercials and in-store promotions for the game. The game received a Mature rating from the Entertainment Software Rating Board, particularly for its graphic content and adult language. This generated some controversy because Nintendo has a reputation for family-friendly games. The European release followed on 30 June 2000. To supplement the game, Rare released a Game Boy Color counterpart, also titled Perfect Dark, shortly afterwards. Connecting the two games using the Transfer Pak allows players to alternately unlock certain cheats within the Nintendo 64 game. In Japan, Perfect Dark was released on 21 October 2000.

Perfect Dark features a different box art for each regional release. Rare's art director Kev Bayliss, who created the North American and European artworks, designed the North American version in one day because Rare needed it very quickly. He then created a more suitable Joanna Dark model for the European version and all the promotional material at the time. For the Japanese release, a completely different image was requested by Nintendo, who originally considered releasing the game in Japan under the title "Aka to Kuro" (赤と黒; lit. "Red and Black"). "Perfect Dark" does not translate well into Japanese, and the title "Aka to Kuro" was considered sufficiently edgy. The game was ultimately released as パーフェクト・ダーク (Pāfekuto Dāku), a transliteration of the Western title.

Perfect Dark was re-released on the Nintendo Classics service on 18 June 2024.

== Reception ==
Reception

Aggregate scores
Aggregator	Score
GameRankings	95%
Metacritic	97/100

Review scores
Publication	Score
AllGame	4.5/5
Edge	9/10
Electronic Gaming Monthly	29.5/30
EP Daily	10/10
GamePro	5/5
GameRevolution	A−
GameSpot	9.9/10
IGN	9.8/10
N64 Magazine	96%
Next Generation	4/5
Nintendo Power	9.6/10

Perfect Dark received critical acclaim from video game publications. The most praised aspects of the game were its graphics, artificial intelligence, and number of multiplayer options. GameSpot claimed that, as a console first-person shooter, Perfect Dark is "unparalleled", while IGN journalist Matt Casamassina remarked that its extensive features set the game apart from its peers. Similarly, N64 Magazine described Perfect Dark as "dauntingly huge", stating that it "takes everything that made its predecessor such an enduring favourite and does it bigger, better and more often". Edge concluded that, although the game fails to be as revolutionary as its predecessor, it refines its "phenomenal gameplay while massively developing its multiplayer components". Nintendo Power editors called the game "undeniably a work of art", suspenseful, "more compelling than most action movies and much deeper than any video game of its type".

The graphics were praised for their dynamic lighting, complex geometry, varied textures, and smooth animations. IGN remarked that levels were more detailed than in GoldenEye 007, and that character models and weapons were well-animated. GameRevolution highlighted the game's semi-realistic look, saying that it "adds to the depth and addiction of the game". The game's voiced cutscenes, surround sound effects, and atmospheric score, which was described as a mixture between the Blade Runner soundtrack by Vangelis and GoldenEye 007's, were said to effectively bring the game to life. The Electric Playground credited Rare for being able to fit such a clear-sounding experience into the limited space of a Nintendo 64 cartridge. The four reviewers in Japanese magazine Famitsu gave the game each a seven out of ten rating, with criticism being that visuals induced motion sickness and were inferior to graphics from the next generation of video game consoles, with the ultimate consensus was the game was only recommended for fans of the genre.

The gameplay was praised for the challenging artificial intelligence of enemies and varied level design. The enemies were admired for their use of squad tactics, ability to wait for players to come back instead of obediently chasing after them, and for ducking around a corner for cover. As with GoldenEye 007, the game's nonlinear approach to completing mission objectives was highlighted positively, giving players freedom to deal with situations as they see fit. The multiplayer mode was seen as the strongest aspect of the game. Reviewers noted that the flexibility of options, number of gameplay modes, "clever" weapons, number of unlockable features, and customisable computer-controlled bots give the game an unprecedented amount of replay value. GamePro called the game's Counter-Operative mode one of the "coolest multiplayer modes ever", stating that the player playing as Joanna never knows which enemy the opposing player controls.

The game's inconsistent frame rate was frequently criticised. According to Trigger Happy author Steven Poole, the game's "inadequate temporal resolution—owing to a wrongheaded choice to privilege visual detail over frame-rate—made it unplayable at higher difficulty levels". IGN editors observed that the frame rate can be choppy in large areas or environments with many characters on screen, but felt they were too frequently caught up in the game to notice it, or else were willing to forgive it. Poole described the "lazy sci-fi fetishism" of Joanna Dark's character design as "a blatant and doomed attempt to steal the thunder of Lara Croft", and argued that she illustrated the challenges of characterising the protagonists of first-person shooters, a problem that GoldenEye 007 had avoided by using the already well-known character James Bond.

At their Best and Worst of 2000 awards, GameSpot editors awarded Perfect Dark Best Nintendo 64 Game and Best Shooting Game, and nominated it in the Best Multiplayer Game category. Rare was recognised for its work on the game and received the BAFTA Interactive Entertainment Moving Images Award for 2000, and the Golden Satellite Award for Best Interactive Product in 2001.

=== Sales ===
According to NPD's Toy Retail Survey Tracking system, Perfect Dark was the second best-selling game of May 2000 in North America, behind Pokémon Trading Card Game. The Japanese launch saw sales totalling 35,000 units in its first week. As a bestseller, Perfect Dark joined Nintendo's "Player's Choice" game selection on 21 December 2000. The game sold relatively well through the year's holiday season, reaching No. 23 on the all formats chart for the week of 24 December 2000. By 2001, the game generated more than $55 million in revenue based on more than 1 million units sold according to NPD. As of March 2003, Perfect Dark had sold almost 1.3 million copies in the United States and 77,000 copies in Japan. Total sales in the United States reached 1.5 million by December 2007. In a 2011 interview with Eurogamer, game designer Chris Tilston revealed that lifetime sales for the game reached 3.2 million, but did not clarify if the figure accounted for units shipped to retailers.

== Legacy ==
Shortly after Perfect Dark was released, Rare planned to develop a "sister" title, called Velvet Dark, for either the Nintendo 64 or its successor, the GameCube, but the project never moved beyond pre-production and was ultimately abandoned. The name "Velvet Dark" references Joanna Dark's alleged sister in the co-operative mode, who would have been the game's protagonist. Meanwhile, Free Radical Design released TimeSplitters for the PlayStation 2 in October 2000, a first-person shooter based around a completely new engine. TimeSplitters bears several gameplay and presentational similarities to GoldenEye 007 and Perfect Dark, including a similar aiming system and unlockable options through quick level completions. After Rare was purchased by Microsoft in 2002, the company released a prequel, Perfect Dark Zero, as a launch title for the Xbox 360 in 2005. Although the game received generally positive reviews from critics, some publications felt it did not meet their expectations.

In a retrospective analysis, Edge acknowledged that the game's frame rate and other dated elements of its design rendered it "nigh-on unplayable". The magazine found the ambitious mentality which resulted in weapons and computer-controlled players being "designed for possibilities rather than balance", both one of Perfect Dark's most interesting aspects and the cause of its biggest problem: "Restraint [...] would have made Perfect Dark a tighter, more focused experience, helped with those framerate issues, and removed almost all of the fun". The magazine concluded that despite Perfect Dark not standing up as a good game to play in 2009, "its currency of ideas and provocation [...] remains sound". In 2015, Den of Geek considered Perfect Dark "a game that's done more for the shooter genre than often credited for", and said that the game was still ahead of its time because no game had revitalised its ideas.

Since its release, the game has attracted a following of elite players who constantly try to speedrun its levels and break world records. These records are managed by their website and involve highly skilled players exploiting tiny gameplay inconsistencies. The game is occasionally cited as one of the greatest video games of all time. In 2001, Electronic Gaming Monthly editors ranked Perfect Dark 65th on their list of Top 100 Games of All Time, while Nintendo Power included it in their 2006 list of Top 200 Nintendo games. In 2007, IGN editors placed the game at No. 86 on their list of Top 100 Games of All Time, noting that "Everything that GoldenEye made great, Perfect Dark did too, and then some." Similarly, Edge placed the title at No. 28 on their 2007 list of 100 Best Videogames (a list voted for by readers, Edge staff and gaming industry professionals), claiming that the game brought the Nintendo 64 era to a satisfying close. In 2009, Official Nintendo Magazine ranked it 37th on a list of 100 Best Nintendo Games.

In 2022, a fan by the name of Ryan Dwyer fully decompiled the original ROM image into C source code, allowing the game to be ported unofficially to various platforms. An unofficial PC port was released in 2023.

== Remaster ==
A remaster of the game, also titled Perfect Dark, was released in 2010 for the Xbox 360 through its Xbox Live Arcade download service, featuring an improved frame rate, enhanced graphics and online multiplayer. The remaster was developed by 4J Studios, the same studio that previously handled the Xbox 360 ports of Rare's platform games Banjo-Kazooie and Banjo-Tooie. The game received generally favorable reviews from gaming publications. Some critics considered the relatively unchanged game to be outdated, but most agreed that the title was a solid revival of a classic. In 2015, the remaster was included in the Rare Replay video game compilation for Xbox One.
