= Perfect Dark (series) =

Video game franchise

- Original logo
- Genres: First-person shooter, stealth, action
- Developers: Rare; 4J Studios
- Publishers: Rare (2000–2001); Xbox Game Studios (2002–present)
- Platforms: Nintendo 64; Game Boy Color; Xbox 360
- First release: Perfect Dark (N64); 22 May 2000
- Latest release: Perfect Dark (X360); 17 March 2010

Perfect Dark is a science-fiction video game series created by Rare and owned by Xbox Game Studios. It debuted in 2000 with the release of the Nintendo 64 first-person shooter Perfect Dark. The series follows Joanna Dark, an agent of the Carrington Institute agency, as she uncovers conspiracies by rival corporation dataDyne. In addition to video games, the series has expanded into novels and comics. These supplements to the video games have resulted in a significant development of the series' fictional universe.

== Media ==
=== Video games ===
The Perfect Dark series debuted in 2000 with the Nintendo 64 first-person shooter Perfect Dark. Set in 2023, the game follows Joanna Dark, an agent of the Carrington Institute, as she attempts to stop a conspiracy by rival corporation dataDyne that involve extraterrestrial life and technology. It features a single-player mode where the player must complete a series of missions under certain difficulty settings, and a range of multiplayer options. A different game, also titled Perfect Dark, was released for the Game Boy Color shortly afterwards. It takes place in 2022 and focuses on Joanna's attempts to prove herself as an agent for the Carrington Institute.

A second first-person shooter, Perfect Dark Zero, was released for the Xbox 360 in 2005. Set in 2020, the game follows Joanna as a bounty hunter working with her father and a computer hacker before she joins the Carrington Institute in an effort to stop dataDyne from taking possession of an artifact which endows individuals with superhuman powers. In addition to a single-player mode, the game features both an online co-operative and a competitive multiplayer mode. A remaster of the Nintendo 64 game, also titled Perfect Dark, was released for the Xbox 360 in 2010. It features improved graphics and supports online gameplay.

=== Other media ===
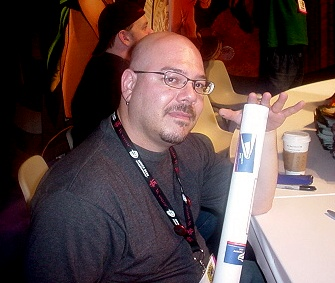
Greg Rucka (pictured in 2004) wrote two Perfect Dark novels.

In addition to video games, the series has expanded into other media, including novels and comics. These supplements to the video games have resulted in a significant development of the series' fictional universe. In 2000, two comics written by Stuart Taylor, inked by Dave Roberts, and coloured by Alwyn Talbot were included in the Nintendo 64 game's Official Player's Guide by Nintendo Power. The first comic, Graduation Day, takes place before the events of the Nintendo 64 game and partially covers the story of the Game Boy Color game. The second comic, Hunting Season, is set one year after the events of the Nintendo 64 game and follows Joanna as she learns dataDyne's secret human cloning program to create replicants of world leaders. In 2000, 4Kids Entertainment obtained merchandising rights to Perfect Dark toys, movies, and other recreational products but nothing came out of it. In 2001, Fireworks Entertainment acquired the rights to produce a TV series and a film, but both projects never materialised.

A set of novels published by Tor Books and a comic book series published by Prima Games were released to supplement Perfect Dark Zero. The first novel, Initial Vector, was written by Greg Rucka and released in 2005. It is set six months after the events of the game and portrays Joanna as an ex-bounty hunter drawn into the Carrington Institute's battle with dataDyne through her own vendetta against the big corporations. Since Rucka could not play Perfect Dark Zero while he was writing Initial Vector, the novel is self-contained and does not give away much of the game's story. The novel also develops the character of Cassandra De Vries from the Nintendo 64 game to a greater degree. According to Rucka: "If you've played the first game, you're going to get a huge treat, because a lot of stuff that happens in Perfect Dark, we set up in the novel".

The comic book series, Janus' Tears, was written by Eric Trautmann and illustrated by Cold FuZion Studios. It was released in six monthly issues from August 2006 to January 2007 and revolves around Joanna's attempts to unmask a mole in the Carrington Institute's Los Angeles office. Trautmann also wrote a comic booklet included in the Limited Collector's Edition of Perfect Dark Zero, entitled Hong Kong Sunrise, which sets the scene for the game. Both Rucka and Trautmann worked closely together to keep the Perfect Dark timeline consistent. A second novel, Second Front, was also written by Rucka and released in 2007. It follows Joanna as she attempts to stop a clandestine group of hackers responsible for some major accidents that allowed dataDyne to take over involved corporations.

== Development history ==
Release timeline
2000	Perfect Dark (N64)
2000	Perfect Dark (GBC)
2001
2002
2003
2004
2005	Perfect Dark Zero
2006
2007
2008
2009
2010	Perfect Dark (X360)

The Perfect Dark series was created by Rare when the company was still a second-party developer for Nintendo. The original game, which was released for the Nintendo 64 in 2000, is considered a spiritual successor to Rare's 1997 first-person shooter GoldenEye 007. It was accompanied by a handheld game for the Game Boy Color, released shortly afterwards. Both games feature a compatibility mode that allows certain gameplay options within the Nintendo 64 game to alternatively be unlocked via a Transfer Pak. A "sister" game to the Nintendo 64 title, entitled Velvet Dark, was initially planned to be developed for either the Nintendo 64 or GameCube, but the project was ultimately abandoned. The name "Velvet Dark" references Joanna's alleged sister, who is the character players assume the role of in the game's co-operative mode.

After Rare was purchased by Microsoft in 2002, the company released a prequel, Perfect Dark Zero, as a launch title for the Xbox 360 in 2005. Work on a two-part sequel to the Nintendo 64 game began in 2006. A team led by Chris Seavor, who had directed Conker's Bad Fur Day, was in charge of the project. In contrast to Perfect Dark Zero's mythical themes, the sequel would feature a more serious and science fiction tone. The first part, entitled Perfect Dark Core, would follow Joanna traveling around the world and visiting places like Cairo and Russia, before landing on Saturn's largest moon, Titan, where Russia had uncovered an ancient civilisation beneath its frosty surface. Characters from the original game like Elvis and Mr. Blonde would return. The second part, entitled Perfect Dark Vengeance, would follow Core's story.

Although both Core and Vengeance would form an overarching story, each part would be a fully featured and stand-alone game with its own multiplayer mode. Once Core had been released, Rare hoped to use the same technology to speed up the development of Vengeance. Seavor mentioned Deus Ex as an inspiration, stating that Core "wasn't as narrow as something like Call Duty [sic], where it's like, walk, cutscene, walk, cutscene. It was definitely going to be, you could go over here and do this over here, or you could go over here and do this over here. And then it would bottleneck down to something that would then take you to the next bit". The game would feature several parkour mechanics, including jumping from walls, and would be played entirely from a first-person perspective. The game was in pre-production for nearly a year. It was cancelled in 2007 because Microsoft felt that Perfect Dark Zero did not sell well enough, leading them to prioritise other science fiction series like Halo and Gears of War.

In 2010, a remaster of the Nintendo 64 game was released for the Xbox 360 through its Xbox Live Arcade download service. The remaster was developed by 4J Studios, a company that had previously handled the Xbox 360 ports of Rare's platform games Banjo-Kazooie and Banjo-Tooie. In 2013, Rare considered the possibility of developing a Perfect Dark game that would use the Kinect sensor. In 2015, Microsoft Studios creative director Ken Lobb said that they had not abandoned the Perfect Dark series and that a new game would eventually be developed, although not necessarily as a first-person shooter. Both Perfect Dark Zero and the remaster were included in the Rare Replay compilation that was released for Xbox One in 2015. At The Game Awards 2020, it was announced that a Perfect Dark reboot was in development. In July 2025, the reboot was cancelled as part of several rounds of layoffs by Microsoft. In July 2026, it was reported that id Software was pitching ideas for a new Perfect Dark game before the studio was hit by additional layoffs.
