= Martin Hollis (video game designer) =

British video game designer

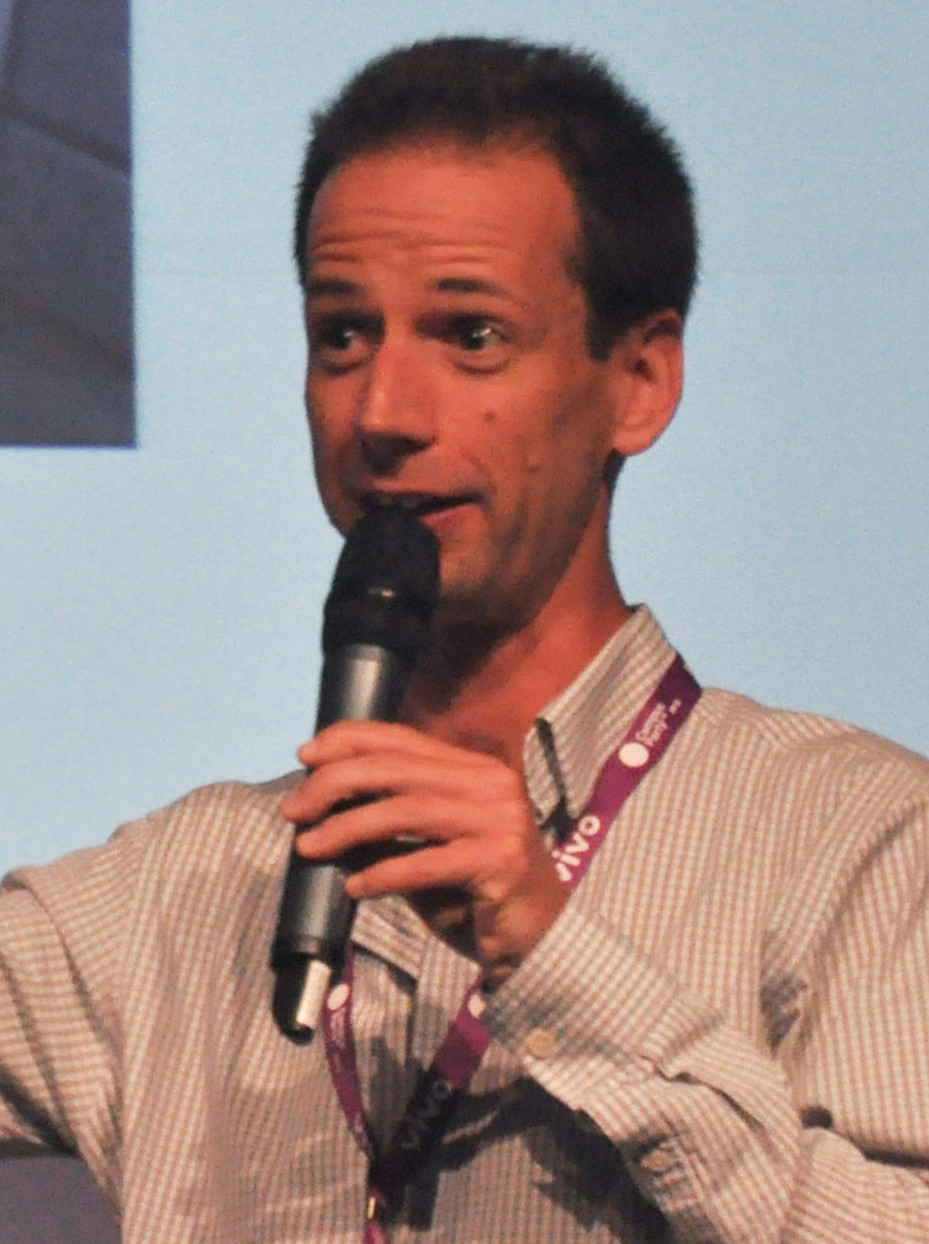
- Hollis in 2013
- Occupation: Video game designer
- Years active: 1993-2010
- Notable work: GoldenEye 007

Martin Hollis is a British former video game designer best known for his work at Rare and directing the critically acclaimed 1997 first-person shooter GoldenEye 007. In 2000, he founded Zoonami, a now-defunct video game development company that was based in Cambridge and closed in 2010. His final release was Bonsai Barber in 2009.

== Early life ==
Martin Hollis grew up playing BBC Micro video games such as Chuckie Egg and Elite. He also used to develop his own games for the system, including a Pac-Man clone and a similar Easter-themed one "with rabbits going around the maze." Before turning 16, he ended up creating between 20 and 40 BBC Micro games, some of which were published in magazines.

Hollis listed Elite for the BBC Micro, Exile for the BBC Micro, The Legend of Zelda: A Link to the Past, Lemmings on the Amiga, Minesweeper, NetHack, Repton 2 for the BBC Micro, The Sentinel for the Commodore 64, Sokoban, and Super Bomberman as his favorite games in 2000.

== Career ==
Martin Hollis studied computer science at the University of Cambridge. He first worked in a small engineering company for a year, developing tools for tracking boats and submarines. In December 1993, when he was 22 years old, he applied for a job at Rare and became the company's first computer science graduate. Due to his knowledge of Unix, he was tasked with setting up the networks of the expensive Silicon Graphics systems Rare had recently acquired at the time. He then worked as a second programmer on the coin-op version of Killer Instinct with Rare's technical director Chris Stamper, who designed the hardware. Hollis programmed the machine's operating system. Both Stamper and Hollis also went to Silicon Graphics in Mountain View, California, where they got the chance to write and test code that would run on the first chips of the then-upcoming Nintendo 64 console.

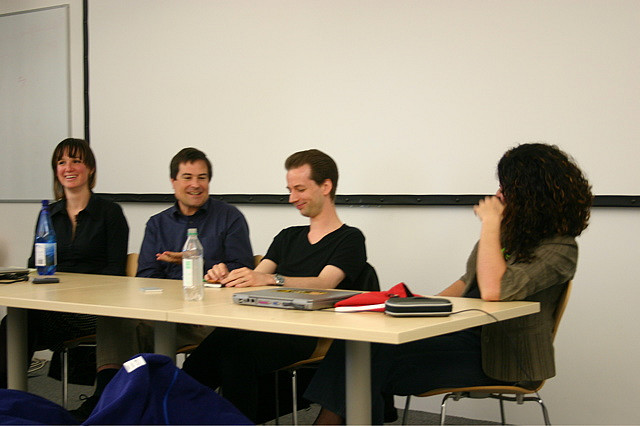
Panel at 2005 game event in Cambridge. From left to right: Aleks Krotoski, David Braben, Martin Hollis, Alice Taylor.

After his work on Killer Instinct, Hollis was interested in leading a team to produce a Nintendo 64 video game based on the 1995 James Bond film GoldenEye, an idea that had been proposed to Rare at the highest level. The resulting game, GoldenEye 007, was inspired by Virtua Cop and released in 1997 to considerable critical and commercial success. Hollis remarked that he worked non-stop on the game, "[averaging] an 80 hour week over the 2 and a half years of the project", and that the team he recruited was very talented and dedicated even though most of it was composed of people who had never worked on video games. GoldenEye 007 designer Duncan Botwood described both Hollis and programmer Mark Edmonds, who created the GoldenEye 007 engine, as some of the smartest people he has ever known.

Hollis and his team were then offered to produce a game based on the GoldenEye sequel Tomorrow Never Dies, but they turned it down without hesitation. He explained that they were all "pretty sick" of the James Bond universe by the time GoldenEye 007 was released, and that their next game needed to be different enough for him to be interesting. In late 1998, after becoming head of software at Rare and having worked for 14 months on Perfect Dark, a spiritual successor to GoldenEye 007, he left the company, partially because he wanted to pursue other interests and did not want to renew another four-year contract with Rare. Although Perfect Dark was released 18 months later, his contributions to the game were significant and the game's protagonist, Joanna Dark, was his creation.

After leaving Rare, Hollis took some time off and spent six months in Southeast Asia. According to him, "I couldn't see myself staying in Twycross [the small village where Rare is based]. I wanted to see more of the world—wanderlust I suppose." Following a recommendation by Chris Stamper, Hollis then worked as a consultant on the development of the GameCube at Nintendo of America in Redmond, Washington. One of his responsibilities was to ensure that the GameCube hardware was game developer friendly. In 2000, he founded Zoonami, a video game development company based in Cambridge. The company's philosophy was to conceive innovative ideas and develop them further. At Zoonami, he worked on Zendoku, a Sudoku-based game released in 2007, and on his final release in 2009: Bonsai Barber, a hairdressing game. Zoonami was closed in 2010 and Martin Hollis has not released any new games since 2009.

Hollis was a regular contributor to the GameCity event in Nottingham, where he talked about the cultural importance of video games.

== Ludography ==
Year	Title	Role
1994	Killer Instinct	Technical Programmer
1996	Killer Instinct 2	Additional Programming
1997	GoldenEye 007	Director, Producer
2000	Perfect Dark	Project Leader
2007	Zendoku	Director, Producer
2009	Bonsai Barber	"Head Gardener"

=== Canceled projects ===
Year	Title	Ref(s)
2002	Game Zero	
2004	Funkydilla	

== Works cited ==
- "The 100 best games of all time". Edge. No. 80. Future plc. 2000.
