= Joanna Dark =

- Perfect Dark character
- Joanna Dark in Perfect Dark Zero
- First game: Perfect Dark (2000)
- Voiced by: Eveline Fischer (Perfect Dark); Laurence Bouvard (Perfect Dark Zero); Alix Wilton Regan (cancelled reboot)
- Portrayed by: Michele Merkin (Commercials and in-store promotions)

Joanna Dark is a fictional character and the main protagonist of the Perfect Dark video game series. She debuted in the Nintendo 64 first-person shooter Perfect Dark and is a player character in all the games of the series. Outside of video games, Joanna appears as the lead character in all the Perfect Dark novels and comic books. Joanna is an operative for the fictional Carrington Institute, where she was given the nickname "Perfect Dark" in honor of her flawless performance in training.

Joanna Dark was originally created by video game designer Martin Hollis, who found inspiration in a number of fictional heroines such as FBI agent Dana Scully from television series The X-Files, the eponymous femme fatale of the film La Femme Nikita, and Motoko Kusanagi from Manga/Anime Ghost in the Shell among others. Her Perfect Dark Zero model was redesigned by manga artist Wil Overton. Joanna Dark is among Rare's most well known characters and has been featured in several "top lists" by the gaming media.

== Character design ==
Joanna Dark was originally created by Martin Hollis, the director and producer of GoldenEye 007 and Perfect Dark, before he left Rare in 1998. Hollis explained that the suggestion of having a female lead in a first-person shooter was inspired by Kim Kimberly, the protagonist of the first two games in the Silicon Dreams trilogy by Level 9 Computing, where the player experiences the shock of discovering that they are a woman fairly late in the first game. He also felt that there should be more games with female leads. According to him, "Having just made a game starring a man it seemed logical to create one around a woman."

Joanna's design was influenced by a number of fictional heroines, including the seductive spy Agent X-27 in the 1930s film Dishonored, FBI agent Dana Scully from The X-Files television series, and the eponymous femme fatale of the film La Femme Nikita, whom Hollis describes as "iconic, heroic, independent, vulnerable and very damaged." Her haircut and facial features were modelled after actress Winona Ryder. Although the name "Joanna Dark" alludes to the French pronunciation of historical figure Joan of Arc as "Jeanne d'Arc", game designer David Doak explained that the name "Joanna" was conceived before any reference was noticed. Hollis revealed that they "wanted her to be quite normal, not with supermodel looks." Joanna wears different attire throughout the game, a decision to make her "intrinsically fashionable". A black dress Joanna wears has an image of a dragon from Killer Instinct. In Perfect Dark, she was voiced by Eveline Fischer, a video game music composer who worked at Rare.

In Perfect Dark Zero, Joanna was redesigned by manga artist Wil Overton. Overton added more distinctive elements, including a star tattoo on the left side of her neck, a blonde streak in her hair, and a choppy outline to her hairstyle. Her hair was also changed from short and red to shoulder-length and orange. Hollis stated that while he liked the new concept work, he could not imagine why she would wear the orange. According to him, "It is uncharacteristic. Quite apart from the practical problem of being a beacon for bullets—Secret Agents don't wear orange for good reason." Process for her character design went through several alterations. Images of the initial concept were met with much derision among the fans who criticized Joanna's new manga-like appearance. In response, the developers chose to tone down some of the more stylized aspects of the design, eventually arriving at a more realistic appearance. For the cancelled sequel Perfect Dark Core, Dark was altered to fit the game's realistic atmosphere, being described as a "smoking, flirting" version.

== Appearances ==
=== In video games ===
Joanna's first appearance is in the Nintendo 64 title Perfect Dark, released in 2000. In the game, Joanna is an operative for the fictional Carrington Institute, where she was given the nickname "Perfect Dark" in honor of her flawless performance in training. On her first mission, she is sent to extract a dataDyne defector. In the process, she uncovers a conspiracy between world's biggest corporation dataDyne and a group of Skedars, extraterrestrials who have established an interstellar war against another alien race known as the Maians. The conspirators plan to steal a megaweapon from a crashed spacecraft on the Earth's ocean floor and use it against the Maian homeworld. However, unbeknownst to dataDyne, the Skedar also intend to test fire the weapon on Earth, destroying it in the process. With the help of a Maian bodyguard, Joanna manages to locate the megaweapon and destroy it. Afterward, she helps the Maians launch a counterattack against the Skedar homeworld, eliminating their High Priest, thereby issuing a devastating blow to morale.

Joanna returns in a Game Boy Color game, which is set one year prior to the Nintendo 64 title. Having completed her training successfully and earned the trust of Institute's leader Daniel Carrington, Joanna is sent to the South American jungle, where she must destroy an illegal cyborg manufacturing facility. In the process, she witnessed an aircraft being shot down and made a note of the co-ordinates. As a result, she is ordered to investigate the crash site, where she eventually discovers that the wreckage belonged to the Skedar. In retaliation, the Institute is stormed by a dataDyne strike team to destroy any clues of the conspiracy, but Joanna ultimately stops it.

The 2005 prequel Perfect Dark Zero takes place three years before the events of the Nintendo 64 game, where Joanna is a bounty hunter working with her father Jack. On their first mission, they rescue a scientist named Zeigler from the hands of the Triad crime lord based out of Hong Kong. Zeigler discovered an ancient artifact in Africa which endows individuals with superhuman powers, hinted to have been built by the Maians. However, Zeigler is killed shortly after and Jack is captured by dataDyne, who is also interested in the artifact. Joanna later manages to rescue him from the palace of Zhang Li, the secretive founder of dataDyne, but Jack is eventually killed by Zhang Li's daughter, Mai Hem. Joanna then finds her goals coinciding with those of the Carrington Institute. Taking advantage of their resources, Joanna avenges her father's death by killing Mai Hem and later Zhang Li, who used the artifact on himself.

=== In other media ===
Joanna Dark is the primary protagonist in the Perfect Dark novels and comic books. In the first novel, Initial Vector, which is set six months after Perfect Dark Zero, Joanna finds herself living in the Carrington Institute grounds and must learn to trust Daniel Carrington, as well as uncovering a conspiracy that may influence on dataDyne's new CEO election. The second novel, Second Front, follows Joanna as she attempts to stop a clandestine group of hackers responsible for some major accidents that allowed dataDyne to take over involved corporations. Janus' Tears, a six-issue American comic book which is set between both novels, focuses on Joanna's attempts to unmask a mole in the Carrington Institute's Los Angeles office.

== Promotion and reception ==
In 2000, American model Michele Merkin portrayed the character in commercials and in-store promotions for the Nintendo 64 game cartridge. In 2001, Blue Box Toys produced a 12-inch action figure based on her appearance in the N64 game. The figure came with several in-game weapons and was available in two looks—one dressed in a body armor suit and the other in a black leather jumpsuit.

Joanna Dark is among Rare's most well-known characters. In 2007, Tom's Games included her on the list of the 50 greatest female characters in video game history, calling her "all three Charlie's Angels rolled into one" and stating she should be played by Jessica Timberlake. In 2008, Spike featured Joanna Dark as sixth on their list of "The Top Video Game Vixens", and The Age ranked her as the 20th-greatest Xbox character of all time even as her Perfect Dark Zero "may not have been the greatest entry for" her as opposed to the first game for the Nintendo consoles. In 2013, Scott Marley of Daily Record ranked her as the third-most attractive female video game character. In 2015, Thanh Niên ranked this "perfect spy" as the fifth-most sexy female video game character. The website GamingBolt named Joanna's animated look in Perfect Dark Zero as fifth on their list of "Worst Video Game Character Designs That Were Totally Disliked By Gamers", stating that the change "did nothing for her character".

Entertainment Weekly elected Joanna Dark the 14th-coolest videogame character. In 2013, Darren Franich of Entertainment Weekly listed her as one of "15 Kick-Ass Women in Videogames", asserting that "Joanna was a standout heroine in a genre that trends, even now, toward hyper-masculinity." Despite this, Joanna was also criticized by Trigger Happy author Steven Poole, who described her character design as "a blatant and doomed attempt to steal the thunder of Lara Croft", and argued that she illustrated the challenges of characterising the protagonists of first-person shooters. Complex considered Joanna one of the greatest heroines in video game history, praising her down-to-earth role in the original game. In 2018, GamesRadar+ editors stated that Joanna was one of their most wanted characters for the crossover fighting video game series Super Smash Bros. In 2021, Chris Morgan of Yardbarker described Joanna as one of "the most memorable characters from old school Nintendo games".
