= Donkey Kong Land =

1995 video game

- Developer: Rare
- Publisher: Nintendo
- Programmer: Paul Machacek
- Composers: David Wise; Graeme Norgate
- Series: Donkey Kong
- Platform: Game Boy
- Release: NA: 26 June 1995; JP: 27 July 1995; EU: 24 August 1995
- Genre: Platform
- Mode: Single-player

Donkey Kong Land, known in Japan as Super Donkey Kong GB, (Note: Japanese: スーパードンキーコングGB, Hepburn: Sūpā Donkī Kongu Jībī) is a 1995 platform game developed by Rare and published by Nintendo for the Game Boy. It condenses the side-scrolling gameplay of the Super Nintendo Entertainment System (SNES) game Donkey Kong Country (1994) for the handheld Game Boy with different level design and boss fights. The player controls the gorilla Donkey Kong and his nephew Diddy Kong as they defeat enemies and collect items across 30 levels to recover their stolen banana hoard from the crocodile King K. Rool.

Development began in 1994, before Donkey Kong Country's completion, and lasted a year. Rare's Game Boy programmer, Paul Machacek, developed Land as an original game rather than as a port of Country after convincing the Rare co-founder Tim Stamper it would be a better use of resources. Like Country, Land features pre-rendered graphics converted to sprites through a compression technique. Rare retooled Country's gameplay to account for the lower quality display, and David Wise and Graeme Norgate converted the soundtrack to the Game Boy's sound chip.

Donkey Kong Land was released in mid-1995. It sold 3.91 million copies and received positive reviews. Critics praised it as successfully translating Country's gameplay, visuals, and music to the Game Boy, though they disagreed over whether it was an equal experience. Land was followed by Donkey Kong Land 2 (1996), Donkey Kong Land III (1997), and a Game Boy Color version of Country (2000), which attempted to replicate the SNES Country games more closely. Land and its sequels were rereleased for the Nintendo 3DS via the Virtual Console service in 2014, and on the Nintendo Switch via the Nintendo Classics service in 2024.

== Gameplay ==
Donkey Kong hangs from a chain in a city-themed level unique to Donkey Kong Land.

As a handheld companion to the Super Nintendo Entertainment System (SNES) game Donkey Kong Country (1994), Donkey Kong Land features similar gameplay: it is a side-scrolling platform game in which the player controls the gorilla Donkey Kong and his nephew Diddy Kong across 30 levels. Donkey is stronger, Diddy is faster, and the player can swap between them at will. They jump between platforms, stomp on enemies, swing on vines, and avoid obstacles. The story begins after Cranky Kong challenges Donkey and Diddy to replicate Donkey Kong Country's success on the Game Boy's 8-bit hardware and coaxes King K. Rool and the Kremlings into stealing their banana hoard again.

The player travels through four worlds, their progress tracked by a world map. Land retains some level themes from Country, such as jungles and coral reefs, but introduces others, such as cliffs and clouds. It also features different level design, enemy varieties (such as flying pigs), and bosses. Levels are populated by collectible bananas, barrel-shaped cannons, hidden bonus stages, throwable items, and letters spelling K–O–N–G that save the player's progress. Some levels feature one of two animal companions, the rhino Rambi and the ostrich Expresso, who provide the Kongs with special abilities. Each world ends in a boss fight. The player starts with a limited number of lives, which are lost if they fall down a bottomless pit or are damaged by an enemy. The player can earn extra lives by collecting balloons or a hundred bananas.

== Development ==
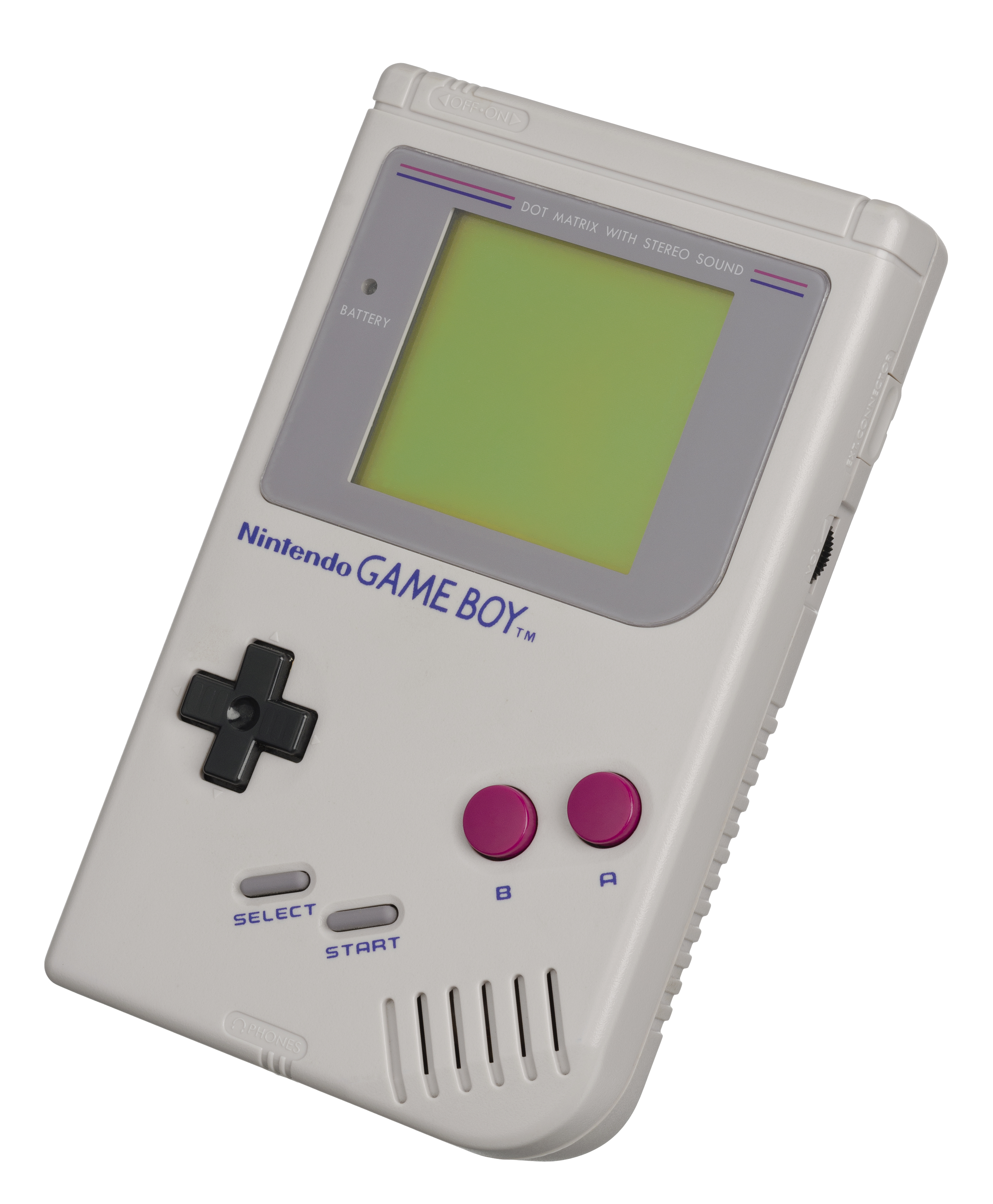
Donkey Kong Land was developed for the Game Boy (pictured).

Rare began working on Donkey Kong Land in 1994, alongside Donkey Kong Country and shortly before the cancellation of a Battletoads Arcade Game Boy port. Rare's co-founder, Tim Stamper, asked their Game Boy programmer Paul Machacek to port Donkey Kong Country to the Game Boy. Machacek convinced Stamper it would be better to develop a similar but original game, as he had with the Game Boy version of Battletoads (1991). He reasoned it would not take much more effort and would expand the audience to those who had not purchased Donkey Kong Country. After Machacek spent roughly three weeks updating the Game Boy Battletoads game engine to handle a Donkey Kong game, development began and lasted a year.

Like Country, Land features pre-rendered graphics converted to sprites through Rare's Advanced Computer Modelling (ACM) compression technique. Although the Game Boy is considerably less powerful than the SNES, its basic architecture is similar; this allowed Machacek to easily transfer Country artwork to Land and the artists to use the same PowerAnimator tools for new ACM assets. The project pushed the Game Boy to its limits because of its graphics. Particularly, constructing levels with slopes and animating collectibles, both uncommon in Game Boy games, required a greater ROM size. The limitations meant only one player character could appear on-screen at a time and that Rare had to reduce the number of bonus stages and animal companions.

Land's team started as just Machacek but grew to over 15. They worked separately from the teams that developed the Country games for the SNES, and designed levels using a spare Silicon Graphics workstation with a custom level editor. Machacek spent considerable time trying to authentically re-create Country's gameplay. Because the Game Boy's small, slow, and monochromatic display made reacting to obstacles more difficult, the team did not re-use level layouts from Country, made boss fights more predictable, and gave Expresso the ability to defeat enemies. They turned the K–O–N–G letters into a save feature, rather than having them provide an extra life as in Country, to make completing the game easier. The team sought to distinguish Land from Country with new game mechanics. Machacek said that replicating Country did not stop Rare from introducing new worlds and design elements in a similar way to the teams developing the SNES sequels, Country 2: Diddy's Kong Quest (1995) and Country 3: Dixie Kong's Double Trouble! (1996).

The soundtrack was composed by David Wise and Graeme Norgate, who worked to convert Wise's Country soundtrack to the Game Boy's sound chip. Norgate, who described Land as his most upbeat work, wrote original tracks to fit the new locales' atmosphere. It was his first Game Boy project and the system's technical restrictions forced him to focus on melodies. He said Wise helped teach him as they worked together: "He'd drip feed me little tricks to improve the overall sound. 'You can repeat the melody three steps forward at a third of the volume to emulate an echo', and voila, your lead melody now has a lovely tight delay that makes it sound a lot wider and smoother".

== Release ==
Donkey Kong Land was the second Donkey Kong game for the Game Boy, following Donkey Kong (1994). Like Donkey Kong Country, Land was announced at the Consumer Electronics Show in Chicago in June 1994 and promoted through Nintendo's Play It Loud! marketing campaign. It was released in North America on 26 June 1995, in Japan on 27 July, and in Europe on 24 August. In Japan, the game was released under the title Super Donkey Kong GB. Nintendo distributed Land in banana yellow cartridges, unlike other Game Boy games, which came in grey. Land was one of several games optimised for the Super Game Boy, a peripheral allowing Game Boy cartridges to be played on a SNES; playing it through the Super Game Boy adds colour palettes and a jungle-themed border. Donkey Kong Land sold 3.91 million copies, making it the bestselling Donkey Kong game for a Game Boy console.

== Reception ==
Reception

Review scores
Publication	Score
Computer and Video Games	93%
Famitsu	7/10, 6/10, 6/10, 5/10
Game Players	81%
VideoGames & Computer Entertainment	9/10
The Electric Playground	9/10

Award
Publication	Award
GamePro	Best Game Boy Game of 1995

Donkey Kong Land received positive reviews and was named the best Game Boy game of 1995 by GamePro. Critics considered it a successful translation of Country's gameplay to the Game Boy and wrote that players who enjoyed the SNES game would also enjoy Land. (Note: Attributed to multiple references: GamePro, The Electric Playground, Video Games, and Electronic Gaming Monthly.) Diehard GameFan and Electronic Gaming Monthly highlighted the new levels, mechanics, and locales, and The Electric Playground said the controls were tight and responsive. GamePro said that despite the technical limitations and smaller scope, Land was "a formidable effort considering what it accomplishes on a portable system", with lengthy levels and challenging gameplay.

Reviewers praised the visuals, impressed by Rare's effort to preserve Country's pre-rendered art style. (Note: Attributed to multiple references: Computer and Video Games, The Electric Playground, Video Games, and GameFan.) GameFan and Video Games: The Ultimate Gaming Magazine called it one of the best-looking Game Boy games with detail unprecedented for the system, and Computer and Video Games (CVG) said the visuals and animations were still excellent despite lacking Country's fidelity. The Electric Playground said the visuals, though great, highlighted the Game Boy's limitations, as its monochromatic screen occasionally made it difficult to comprehend the gameplay. GamePro agreed that the Game Boy's screen did not do the visuals justice, and a Weekly Famicom Tsūshin reviewer questioned the aim for realistic graphics when the result looked like rough pointillism. Some critics recommended playing Land on the Super Game Boy for adding colour and making the visuals easier to discern, though a Weekly Famicom Tsūshin reviewer said even then they were hard to parse.

Opinions differed as to how Land compared to Country and the rest of the Game Boy's library. Some critics considered Land equal to Country (CVG called it superior on the basis of its gameplay); others called it lesser. Game Players felt that both featured quality gameplay, but Land lacked the visual fidelity that made Country special. Some critics called Land one of the best Game Boy games, but The Electric Playground said it was not as inventive, satisfying, or original as the 1994 Game Boy Donkey Kong. Still, they felt it was one of the Game Boy's best platformers and an essential purchase. A Weekly Famicom Tsūshin reviewer thought Land was too difficult. The music and sound were praised as among the Game Boy's best. (Note: Attributed to multiple references: GamePro, The Electric Playground, Video Games, and GameFan.) The Electric Playground believed they were near-perfect translations of Country's, and GameFan said they sounded on par with a SNES game when played through the Super Game Boy.

== Legacy ==
Michael Teitelbaum wrote a children's book adaptation of Donkey Kong Land, Rumble in the Jungle, following its release. Land received three follow-up games: Donkey Kong Land 2 (1996), based on Diddy's Kong Quest; Donkey Kong Land III (1997), based on Dixie Kong's Double Trouble!; and a Game Boy Color version of Donkey Kong Country (2000), which re-creates the SNES game using Land's graphics and audio. The follow-ups attempted to replicate the SNES games more closely; unlike Land, they do not introduce new level archetypes or enemies. The Land trilogy was rereleased for the Nintendo 3DS via the Virtual Console in 2014. Donkey Kong Land was released via the Nintendo Classics service on 22 November 2024.

Retrospective reviewers considered Donkey Kong Land a technical achievement. Nintendo Life felt Rare successfully replicated Country's art style on the Game Boy and praised the music, which they considered among the Game Boy's best. However, Polygon wrote that the developers "were so preoccupied with whether they could [replicate Country's graphics] they forgot to ask if they should. The rich visuals of the Super NES games become completely illegible on Game Boy ... a blurry grey soup of pixel-junk." Nintendo Life said that enemies blending with the background made Land needlessly difficult and lamented the absence of the Super Game Boy enhancements in the 3DS rerelease.

Polygon ranked Donkey Kong Land and its sequels among the lesser Donkey Kong games; In a 2018 interview, Machacek said that of the games he worked on, Donkey Kong Land remained among his favourites. Some of Land's levels, such as K. Rool's pirate ship, were featured in subsequent Donkey Kong games. It also established a tradition of Donkey Kong games being distributed on yellow cartridges, which its sequels and Donkey Kong 64 (1999) continued.

On August 8, 2026, Donkey Kong Land received an unofficial remake of the same name, by developer "kasquez". The remake uses Donkey Kong Country's presentation and physics, and introduces new enemies, levels, and sound.
