= Donkey Kong Jungle Beat =

2004 video game

- North American GameCube cover art
- Developer: Nintendo EAD Tokyo
- Publisher: Nintendo
- Director: Yoshiaki Koizumi
- Producer: Takao Shimizu
- Designer: Koichi Hayashida
- Programmers: Hideaki Shimizu; Naoki Koga; Takeshi Hayakawa
- Artists: Takeshi Hosono; Kenta Motokura; Taeko Sugawara; Atsushi Mishima
- Composer: Mahito Yokota
- Series: Donkey Kong
- Platforms: GameCube, Wii
- Release: December 16, 2004: GameCube; JP: December 16, 2004; EU: February 4, 2005; NA: March 14, 2005 Wii; JP: December 11, 2008; NA: May 4, 2009; EU: June 5, 2009
- Genre: Platform
- Mode: Single-player

Donkey Kong Jungle Beat (Note: Japanese: ドンキーコングジャングルビート, Hepburn: Donkī Kongu Janguru Bīto) is a 2004 platform game developed and published by Nintendo for the GameCube. It follows the gorilla Donkey Kong as he sets out to defeat a series of evil kings to conquer the jungle. Jungle Beat is designed for use with the DK Bongos, a bongo drum-style GameCube controller created for the Donkey Konga (2003) rhythm game. The player controls Donkey Kong through various side-scrolling levels as he collects bananas, swings on vines, chains combos, rides animals, and defeats enemies and bosses.

The debut project of the 65-member Nintendo EAD Tokyo, Jungle Beat's development began around July 2003, after Shigeru Miyamoto suggested that Nintendo should commission a new Donkey Kong game. Development was led by director Yoshiaki Koizumi and producer Takao Shimizu, who sought to create a simple, accessible game in contrast to more complex contemporary games. Koizumi conceived a game that used the DK Bongos instead of a standard gamepad to control the player character, and applied lessons he had learned from previous projects during development. Because the tone differed from previous Donkey Kong games, the team excluded most of the franchise's existing elements and characters.

Jungle Beat was released in Japan in December 2004 and in the West in 2005 as the first major Donkey Kong game since Donkey Kong 64 (1999). It received mostly positive reviews from critics, who complimented its use of the DK Bongos, with praise for its visuals and level design, but was criticized for its short length and low difficulty level. Nintendo EAD Tokyo went on to develop the critically acclaimed Super Mario Galaxy (2007), which refined concepts that were introduced in Jungle Beat. Jungle Beat was rereleased as part of Nintendo's New Play Control! line of GameCube ports for the Wii in 2008; the port contains reworked controls and levels. This version was released as a downloadable game for the Wii U in 2016.

== Gameplay ==
A screenshot of the first level. The combo count builds up based on how many objects Donkey Kong bounces off of without touching the ground.

Donkey Kong Jungle Beat is a 2.5D platform game. Like previous Donkey Kong games, the player controls the gorilla Donkey Kong through a series of side-scrolling levels. It features a simple plot: Donkey Kong sets out on a journey to defeat a series of evil kings attempting to conquer the jungle. While it is compatible with a traditional GameCube controller, Jungle Beat is designed for use with the DK Bongos, a controller that resembles a pair of bongo drums and was previously used for the Donkey Konga (2003) music game. Hitting the individual drums causes Donkey Kong to move; the player hits both drums to jump and claps in front of the DK Bongos' built-in microphone to send a shockwave. The player uses these controls to perform backflips, slap the terrain, swing on vines, and jump between walls.

As the player starts the game, they select a kingdom to explore; there are 16 kingdoms in total, which become available as the campaign progresses. Each kingdom features three levels: two main platforming stages and one boss fight. Unlike traditional platformers, Jungle Beat contains score-attack elements: the goal is not simply to get to the end of the level, but to get as many points, or "beats", as possible, reminiscent of Yoshi’s Story. Beats are obtained by grabbing bananas, which are scattered throughout levels or can be summoned by defeating enemies and interacting with objects. The player performs combos in midair by grabbing bananas; a counter initiates and rises with each banana acquired before landing. Beats also serve as Donkey Kong's health, as the player loses beats if they are damaged by enemies or hazards. If the beat count reaches zero, the player receives a game over and must restart the kingdom from the beginning.

Similar to Donkey Kong Country (1994), certain levels feature rideable animals, each providing a unique attribute: squirrels allow Donkey Kong to glide slowly through the air; wildebeests charge right continuously and plow through objects that provide bananas; orcas carry Donkey Kong through water; and birds allow Donkey Kong to fly. Between most levels, there is a short minigame where the player must tap the bongos as fast as they can to earn extra bananas. The final level of each kingdom contains a boss fight against a large enemy. The game features four types of bosses, each of which must be defeated in a different manner: gorillas must be taken on in a Punch-Out!!-style arena; tanks resembling elephants must be defeated by throwing back bombs that they fire; warthogs must be defeated by throwing coconuts at them; and birds must be defeated by destroying the giant egg they are carrying.

At the end of each kingdom, the total sum of beats (after deducting any damage taken during the boss fight) is tallied. The player earns a crest for completing a kingdom, with additional crests earned by obtaining more beats. Crests are required to play new kingdoms, and clearing all the kingdoms in a section unlocks the next set of kingdoms. Players can revisit earlier kingdoms to earn more beats and crests.

== Development ==
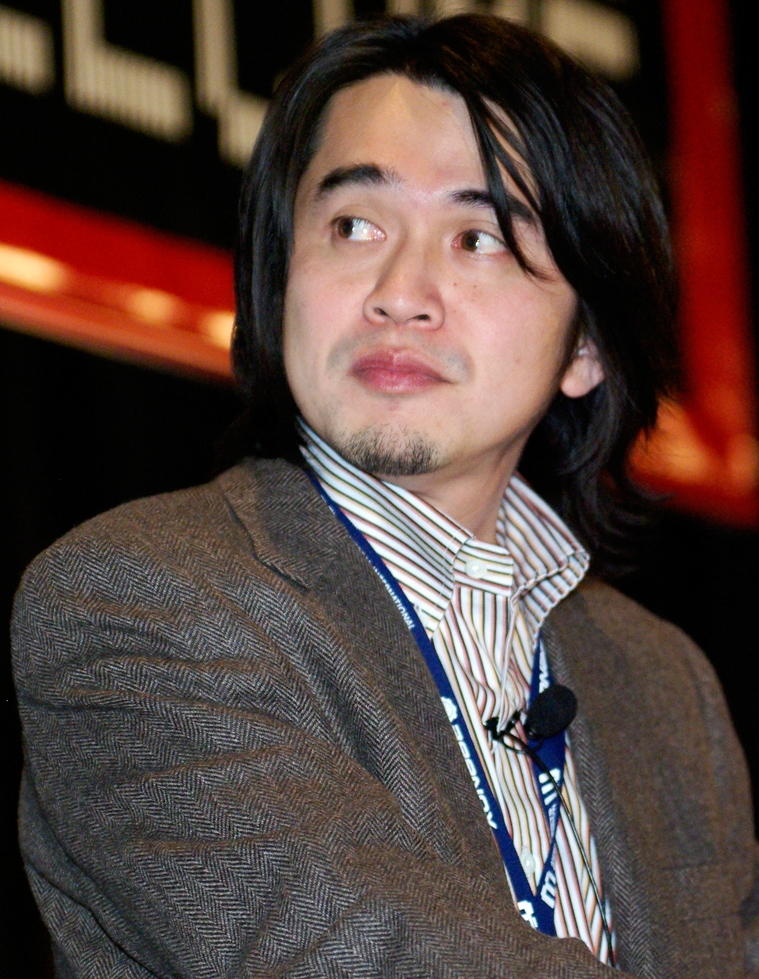
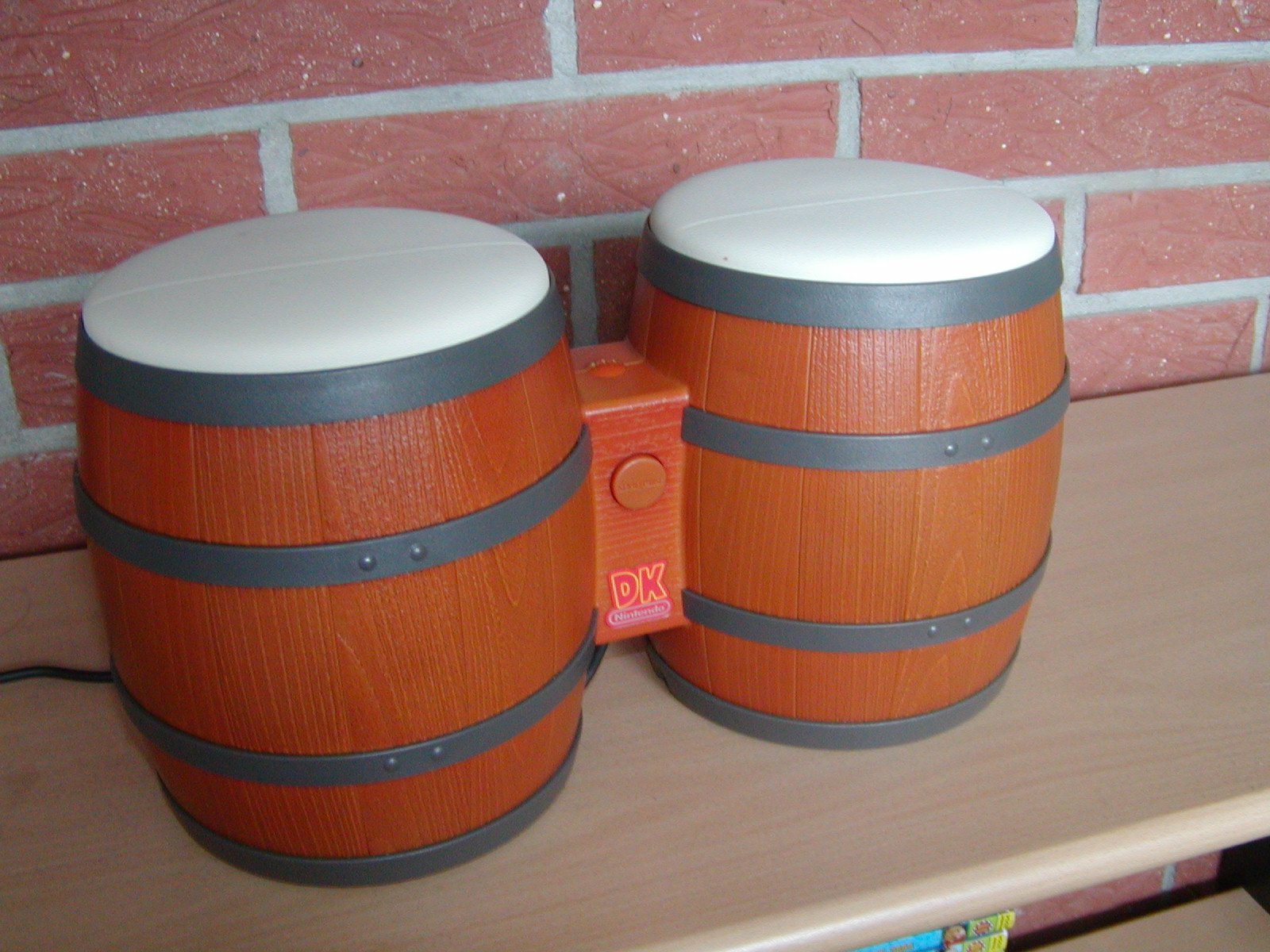
Donkey Kong Jungle Beat's use of the DK Bongos (bottom) originated from director Yoshiaki Koizumi's (top) desire for a simple, easy-to-learn control scheme.

Donkey Kong Jungle Beat was the debut project of Nintendo EAD Tokyo, a game development division of Japanese video game company Nintendo that was formed in 2003 with a 65-person team. Nintendo started planning to develop a new Donkey Kong game internally when the series' developer Rare was acquired by Microsoft in September 2002, and development began for the GameCube shortly after EAD Tokyo was established in July 2003. Division heads Yoshiaki Koizumi and Takao Shimizu—who had previously led development on Nintendo's Super Mario Sunshine (2002)—respectively served as director and producer. Donkey Kong creator Shigeru Miyamoto and Takashi Tezuka also served as producers, while Sunshine programmer Koichi Hayashida was the assistant director and contributed to some level design. Jungle Beat was the first major Donkey Kong game since Rare's Donkey Kong 64 (1999), although it was intended as "more of a stopgap than a permanent status quo" for the franchise.

The Jungle Beat concept originated at Nintendo EAD's primary office in Kyoto, shortly before staff moved to Tokyo to form the new division, when Donkey Kong creator Shigeru Miyamoto suggested that Koizumi and Shimizu develop a new Donkey Kong game. Koizumi and Shimizu were presented the DK Bongos during a meeting regarding Donkey Konga, and Koizumi conceived the central idea for Jungle Beat upon seeing players' reactions to using them. Koizumi explained to EAD Tokyo that he wanted to prioritize what players would experience over how functional the game would be. He said that Jungle Beat "show[s] how we take experiences with our own families at home, or in places other than work, and bring those experiences back to our work". Koizumi, who had handled character controls and virtual camera systems on previous projects, had been "hearing from many people" that controlling characters in modern games was becoming challenging and harbored a desire to create a game with a simple control scheme that did not rely on a traditional gamepad.

Using the DK Bongos presented some challenges; since the controller restricted the player's movements, EAD Tokyo had to conceive new game mechanics as a workaround. The developers chose to change the camera angle when Donkey Kong encounters an enemy—altering the control scheme as a result—to keep his abilities and the action varied. The automatic camera also allowed Koizumi to avoid camera problems he found in previous 3D games that he had worked on. EAD Tokyo prioritized simplicity; Shimizu said that because contemporary video games took considerable time to complete and lost appeal if an individual had to stop playing, Jungle Beat's levels were designed to take between five and ten minutes without any shortcuts. He felt that the game would appeal to a busy person because it did not contain long save or load times.

The developers reflected the simplicity through the story, which only features Donkey Kong trying to be "the best"; they sought to narrate through the gameplay instead. Tonally, Koizumi wanted Jungle Beat to be extravagant and hoped it "would make even bystanders giggle and enjoy themselves". Because the tone differed from previous Donkey Kong games, EAD Tokyo excluded most of the series' recurring characters and elements, aside from Donkey Kong himself and bananas. Koizumi felt this would allow Jungle Beat to stand on its own and reflect the style of EAD Tokyo. Miyamoto supervised EAD Tokyo and reviewed Jungle Beat's content throughout development, similar to the role he played during the development of Rare's Donkey Kong Country in 1994. Mahito Yokota composed the soundtrack, his first project as a composer after joining Nintendo in 2003. Like he did on The Legend of Zelda: The Wind Waker (2002), sound programmer Masafumi Kawamura attempted to synchronize the music with the gameplay, like when Donkey Kong jumps.

Although the game is 2D, Shimizu noted development was still difficult due to technical restraints. EAD Tokyo aimed to release Jungle Beat during Japan's 2004–2005 winter season, which presented a considerable challenge. During a showing at the Nintendo World event in November 2004, Koizumi and the team carefully observed player feedback and used it to polish the game shortly before its release. The team was ultimately able to complete the game in time for the 2004 Christmas shopping season. A two-player multiplayer game mode was planned, but was scrapped in the final product.

== Release ==
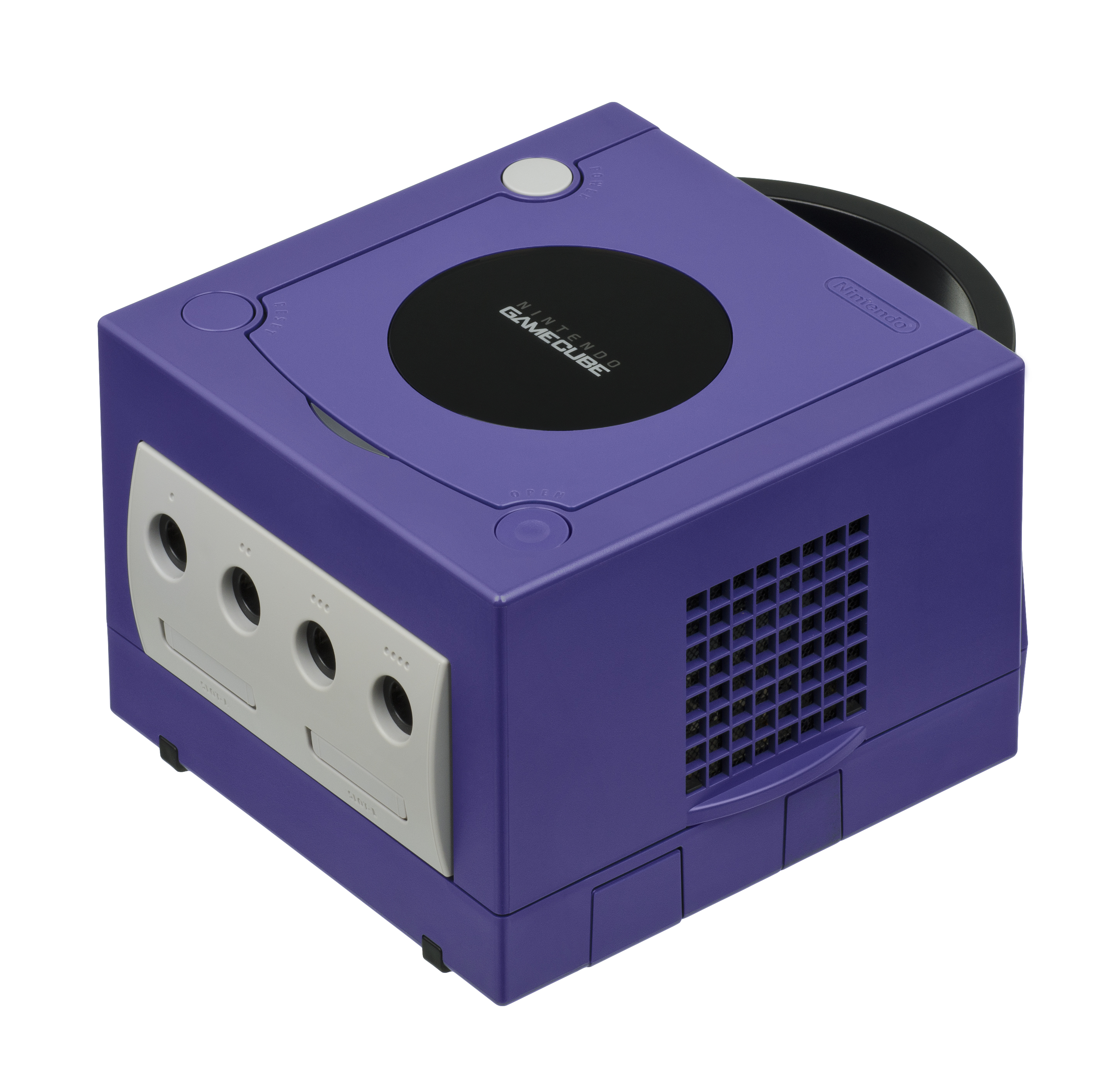
Donkey Kong Jungle Beat was released for the GameCube (pictured) in Japan in December 2004 and in the West in early 2005.

Nintendo announced Donkey Kong Jungle Beat in May 2004 and showcased it at E3 2004 that month. Nintendo's showing was considered "[b]old, energetic, full of attitude and unexpected surprises", and IGN described Jungle Beat as "[t]he sleeper hit of the show" and wrote that attendees did not want to stop playing its presented demo. After the showing, in July Jungle Beat won two Game Critics Awards—selected by journalists from publications such as Time, Entertainment Weekly, and CNN—for "Best Original Game" and "Best Puzzle/Trivia/Parlor Game". It was also showcased at Nintendo World, which took place in five locations across Japan in November.

Jungle Beat was released in Japan on December 16, 2004, in Europe on February 4, 2005, and in North America on March 14. It was the first video game to receive a rating of E10+ from the Entertainment Software Rating Board. It was released as both a standalone game and a bundle with the DK Bongos. The European version was released on the same day as the Game Boy Advance Donkey Kong game DK: King of Swing. To promote the North American release, Nintendo sent 20 individuals dressed up as apes to participate in the 20th Los Angeles Marathon, which took place on March 6. The individuals wore Jungle Beat-branded clothing, carried DK Bongos, and chanted the game's title as they ran. Jungle Beat was released when Donkey Kong had mostly been relegated to spin-offs and supporting roles in other Nintendo franchises, following Microsoft's acquisition of Rare.

Jungle Beat did not perform well commercially. In a 2007 interview with MTV, Nintendo of America writer Nate Bihldorff said that he was "still pissed that not enough people bought Jungle Beat". MTV opined that Jungle Beat "required a Mario-size leap of faith. It's one thing to ask people to control a tennis game with a controller shaped like a remote control, but to run away from a giant lizard and beat up an evil ape using bongos? It's a hard sell and wasn't a very successful one". MTV noted that the DK Bongos were introduced before instrument-controlled games like Guitar Hero became popular, suggesting audiences were apprehensive towards the concept. Furthermore, Donkey Kong fans saw Jungle Beat as "merely an aside to the Donkey Kong platforming saga" rather than the return to the style of Rare's Donkey Kong Country trilogy (1994–1996) that they wanted.

=== New Play Control! version ===
Nintendo rereleased Donkey Kong Jungle Beat as one of the New Play Control! games, a product line comprising seven updated ports of GameCube games for the Wii. The rerelease, New Play Control! Donkey Kong Jungle Beat, was released in Japan on December 11, 2008, as the line's first release. This was followed by a North American release on May 4, 2009, and a European one on June 5. It was also released as a downloadable game on the Wii U's eShop on November 3, 2016.

In lieu of the DK Bongos, the New Play Control! version of Jungle Beat is controlled using the Wii Remote, using its Nunchuk accessory to control Donkey Kong's movement and its motion detection feature to clap. To accommodate the more traditional control scheme, the level designs were altered to include more obstacles, and players do not have to collect crests to progress. It also replaces the banana-based health meter with a more traditional life system, adds a boss rush mode, and supports widescreen television displays.

== Reception ==
Scores

Aggregate scores
| Aggregator | Score | |
| Aggregator | GameCube | Wii |
|---|---|---|
| GameRankings | 82% | 81% |
| Metacritic | 80/100 | 78/100 |

Review scores
| Publication | Score | |
| Publication | GameCube | Wii |
|---|---|---|
| Destructoid | N/A | 8.25/10 |
| Edge | 8/10 | N/A |
| Electronic Gaming Monthly | 7.67/10 | N/A |
| Eurogamer | 8/10 | 8/10 |
| Game Informer | 7.5/10 | N/A |
| GamePro | 4/5 | 4/5 |
| GameRevolution | B− | B− |
| GameSpot | 7/10 | N/A |
| GameSpy | 4/5 | N/A |
| IGN | 8.8/10 | 8.4/10 |
| Nintendo Power | 4.6/5 | N/A |
| Detroit Free Press | 3/4 | N/A |
| The Sydney Morning Herald | 4/5 | N/A |

Award
| Publication | Award |
|---|---|
| Game Critics Awards | Best Original Game, E3 2004; Best Puzzle/Trivia/Parlor Game, E3 2004 |

Donkey Kong Jungle Beat received "generally favorable" reviews across both its releases. Most reviewers considered it unique and fun to play but rather short given the retail price. It was praised for its wide appeal; possessing both a simplicity targeted at new gamers, and a complex, skill-oriented combo system to attract more hardcore gamers. IGN praised the GameCube version's graphics, saying that "DK's fur makes Star Fox Adventures models look primitive". Criticisms include the game's short length, despite the replayability offered by the score system in levels. There were also complaints of repetitive boss fights, as the same four bosses are used several times throughout the game with limited features to distinguish them. One of the primary criticisms, however, was the lack of past characters and elements from Rare's Donkey Kong Country games. Despite these criticisms it was rated the 95th best game made on a Nintendo System in Nintendo Power's Top 200 Games list.

Non video-game publications also praised the GameCube version. The New York Times gave it a favorable review and called it "wildly entertaining". The Sydney Morning Herald gave it four stars out of five, praising the graphics, environments and gameplay, but complained of the game's short length. Detroit Free Press gave it three stars out of four and complimented the use of bongos in the game. Common Sense Media gave the Wii version four stars out of five. Although positive to the game, they considered more as rental than purchase due to its short length.

== Legacy ==
EAD Tokyo went on to develop Super Mario Galaxy (2007) for the Wii, which was acclaimed as one of the greatest video games of all time and became one of the bestselling Wii games. Galaxy refined concepts that EAD Tokyo introduced in Jungle Beat; Koizumi reflected that Jungle Beat provided him with the experience to create engaging gameplay with a simple control scheme in Galaxy. In fact, GamesRadar said that Jungle Beat became more compelling when viewed as a Galaxy prototype, with shared sound effects and a "gleeful turnover of ideas [that] reeks of Galaxy's scattershot fun-bursts". Destructoid said the connections between Jungle Beat and Galaxy were obvious when considering Jungle Beat's "level of imagination and surrealism... [which] wasn't present in the [Donkey Kong Country] games", while Kotaku noted further parallels between level tropes in Jungle Beat and Super Mario Galaxy 2 (2010).

After Jungle Beat, the DK Bongos only saw use in two Donkey Konga sequels. Support for Odama (2006) was dropped prior to release, while a planned DK Bongos-controlled racing game, DK Bongo Blast, was released on the Wii as Donkey Kong Barrel Blast in 2007 without support, and between 2005 and 2006, Capcom developed two medal games that were released in Japan as "semi-sequels" to Jungle Beat, respectively named Jungle Fever, and Banana Kingdom. The Donkey Kong series did not receive another major installment until 2010, when the Retro Studios-developed Donkey Kong Country Returns was released for the Wii. Retrospectively, journalists have cited Jungle Beat as one of the best Donkey Kong games. Jeremy Parish, writing for Polygon, considered it the franchise's best game behind Donkey Kong (1994) for the Game Boy, summarizing it as "a one-of-a-kind thing that really shouldn't work but absolutely does". Jungle Beat has been referenced in Nintendo's Super Smash Bros., a series of crossover fighting games. Super Smash Bros. Brawl (2008) includes a stage based on Jungle Beat's Rumble Falls level, while Donkey Kong's Final Smash in Super Smash Bros. Ultimate (2018)—in which he rapidly punches adversaries—is a tribute to Jungle Beat.
