= Donkey Kong: Barrel Blast =

2007 video game

- North American box art
- Developer: Paon
- Publisher: Nintendo
- Director: Kenichi Imaeda
- Producers: Kentaro Nishimura; Toshiharu Izuno; Rikiya Nakagawa
- Composer: Takashi Kouga
- Series: Donkey Kong
- Platform: Wii
- Release: JP: June 28, 2007; NA: October 8, 2007; EU: January 25, 2008; AU: February 7, 2008
- Genre: Racing
- Modes: Single-player, multiplayer

Donkey Kong: Barrel Blast (Note: Known in Europe and Australia as Donkey Kong Jet Race, and in Japan as Donkey Kong Barrel Jet Race (ドンキーコング たるジェットレース, Donkī Kongu Taru Jetto Rēsu)) is a 2007 racing game developed by Paon and published by Nintendo for the Wii. The game was shown at the E3 convention in May 2006 for the GameCube under the title of DK: Bongo Blast, but this version was ultimately cancelled in favor of a Wii release. It was released for the Wii in Japan and the United States in 2007, and in PAL regions in 2008 with the title Donkey Kong Jet Race.

The game was originally designed to be controlled using the DK Bongos for the GameCube, which were converted to motion controls using the Wii Remote and Nunchuk when development was moved to the Wii.

Barrel Blast was met with generally negative reviews after its release, with critics panning the replacement of the bongo control scheme with imprecise motion controls, as well as the last-generation visuals.

== Gameplay ==
Funky Kong racing on the DK Jungle Sunset course. Players race in the air instead of on the ground like in other racing games.

Donkey Kong: Barrel Blast is a racing game where the player controls their selected character using the Wii Remote and Nunchuk. To accelerate, the player must shake the Wii Remote and Nunchuk alternatively, lift them simultaneously to jump, and use the motion sensor to beat rivals and obstacles using items. The player character is guided by the route of the tracks, including automatically travelling around curves. Players can learn to race at Cranky's flight school where Cranky gives eight lessons on how to play the game, acceleration, use of elements and Wild Moves.

The main mode of play is a Grand Prix similar to that of Mario Kart. Also, like Mario Kart Arcade GP, more than one track will take place in a given area with three courses in DK Jungle, three of the sea, three from the mountain, two of the Desert, two from the snow, two of the Temple of Heaven, and one in outer space. Like other racing games, Barrel Blast includes a Time Trial Mode where players can choose this race on one track for the best time, and have save ghost data stats.

There are 16 characters to choose from in total; eight members of the Kong family, and eight Kremlings. These include Donkey Kong, Diddy Kong, Dixie Kong, Lanky Kong, Tiny Kong, Funky Kong, Wrinkly Kong, and Cranky Kong representing the Kong side, with King K. Rool and various of his underlings representing the Kremling side. Additional Donkey Kong series characters, such as Rambi the Rhino, Enguarde the Swordfish, Zinger, and Necky, make cameo appearances as items.

== Development ==
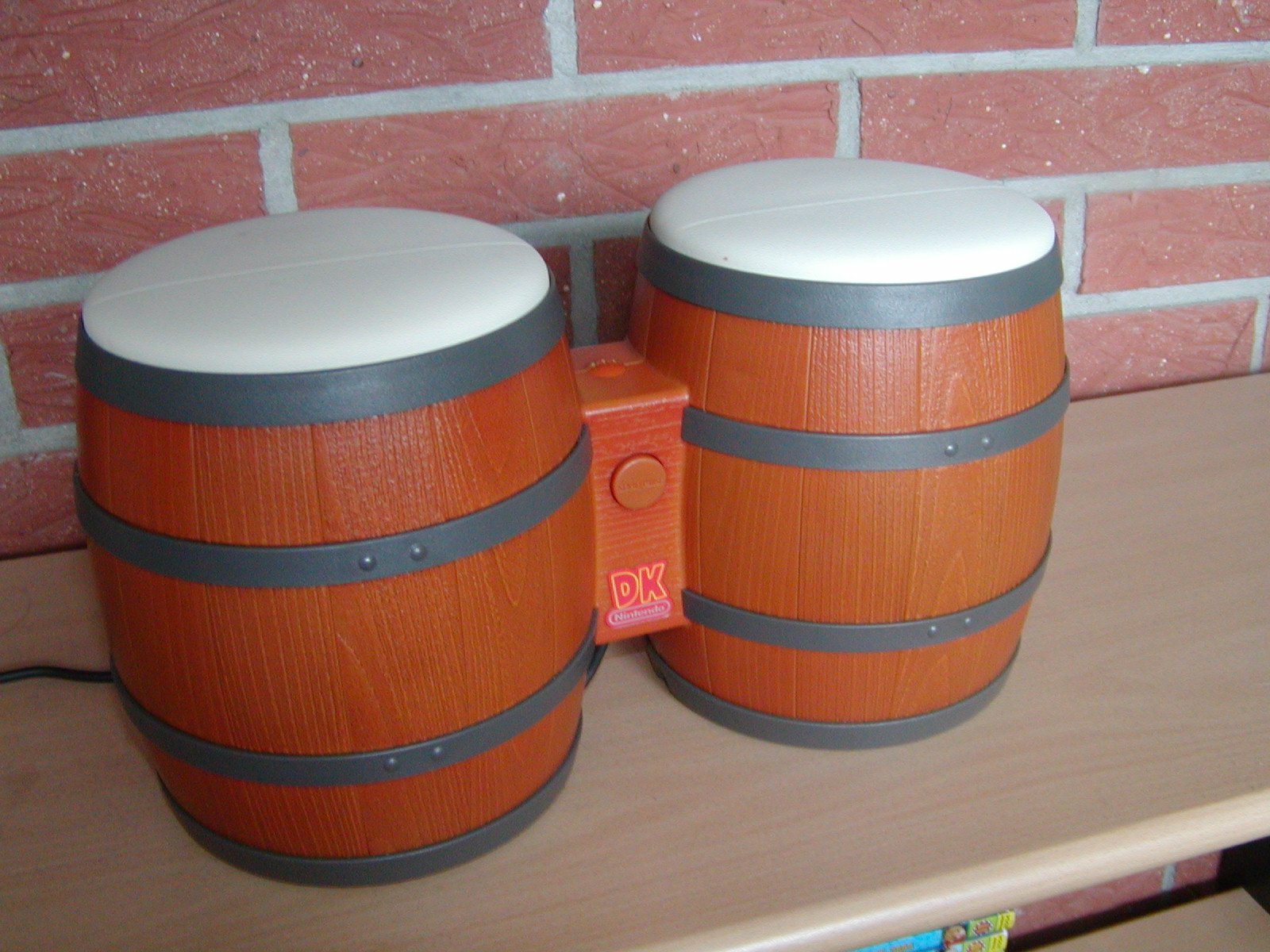
The game was intended to be controlled with the DK Bongos before it was delayed and released as a Wii title in 2007.

Barrel Blast was developed by Paon, who previously worked on DK: King of Swing (2005) and DK: Jungle Climber (2007), two handheld titles in the Donkey Kong series.

In June 2005, an issue of Famitsu reported that Nintendo was developing a new installment in the Donkey Kong franchise for their upcoming Revolution console. The publication offered no details on the next-generation title, but stated that Nintendo appeared to be drawing on the majority of its big licenses to lure in next-generation gamers. Lending credibility to its Kong news, Famitsu also reported that new versions of Super Smash Bros., Super Mario, The Legend of Zelda, Metroid, and Final Fantasy Crystal Chronicles were in development for Revolution, all of which were confirmed by Nintendo at E3 2005 before that month. The game was announced at Nintendo's Japanese conference in 2006. Following speculation that the game could be titled Donkey Jet or DK: Bongo Blast, the game was fully revealed at E3 2007 as Donkey Kong Barrel Blast.

The game was originally developed to be controlled using the DK Bongos for the GameCube; the left and right drums would steer in their respective directions, and rolling both drums accelerated movement. When the game was moved to the Wii, the DK Bongos were replaced with the Wii Remote and Nunchuk, having the player shake the controller in place of hitting the drums. The player can also raise the remote and Nunchuk to jump, and use the motion sensing to punch opponents and obstacles, and to use items.

== Reception ==
Reception

Aggregate scores
Aggregator	Score
GameRankings	43.94%
Metacritic	46/100

Review scores
Publication	Score
1Up.com	D+
Eurogamer	4/10
Game Informer	5/10
GamePro	2.25/5
GameRevolution	D−
GameSpot	4.5/10
GameSpy	1/5
GameTrailers	5.2/10
IGN	4.5/10; 5.8/10 (AU)
Nintendo Life	3/10
Nintendo Power	6.5/10
Nintendo World Report	5.5/10
Official Nintendo Magazine	70%

Donkey Kong: Barrel Blast received mixed to negative reviews from critics and fans alike. GameSpot and IGN gave it 4.5 out of 10 each, and GamePro was the harshest by calling it "the worst game of 2007". Based on 34 reviews, Barrel Blast garnered a metascore of 46 out of 100 according to Metacritic. It is the lowest rated Donkey Kong game on Metacritic, as well as the worst rated game part of the greater Mario franchise. A number of reviews lamented the decision to replace the bongo control scheme with that using the Wii Remote and Nunchuk, as well as the dated visuals.

It was criticized for "slow racing, shallow gameplay, and an overall boring experience" by IGN. GameSpot labeled the game a fifth-rate Mario Kart clone. The second-highest rated Metacritic review, by Nintendo Power, called it a "mundane racer". GameTrailers criticized the game for its imprecise controls, lack of online mode, and the fact that the Bongo Controls were left out of the game.

== See also ==
- Diddy Kong Racing
- Diddy Kong Racing DS
