= Donkey Kong Jr. (disambiguation) =

Donkey Kong Jr. may refer to:

- Donkey Kong Jr., a 1982 arcade game
  - Donkey Kong Jr. (character), the protagonist of the game
  - Donkey Kong Jr. (Game & Watch), a Game & Watch version of the game
- Donkey Kong Jr. Math, a 1983 edutainment game featuring the titular character
