= Donkey Kong Land 2 =

1996 video game

- North American box art
- Developer: Rare
- Publisher: Nintendo
- Designer: Lee Schuneman
- Programmer: Robert Harrison
- Artists: Keri Gunn; Dean Smith
- Composer: Grant Kirkhope (Note: The soundtrack is an 8-bit conversion of the Donkey Kong Country 2: Diddy's Kong Quest music, composed by David Wise.)
- Series: Donkey Kong
- Platform: Game Boy
- Release: NA: 23 September 1996; AU: October 1996; JP: 23 November 1996; EU: 28 November 1996
- Genre: Platform
- Mode: Single-player

Donkey Kong Land 2 (Note: Released in Japan as Donkey Kong Land (ドンキーコングランド, Donkī Kongu Rando)) is a 1996 platform video game developed by Rare and published by Nintendo for the Game Boy. Part of the Donkey Kong video game series, it is the sequel to Donkey Kong Land. It was enhanced for the Super Game Boy with different shades of color, as well as a 16-bit banana border on the edges of the television screen. Like the original Donkey Kong Land, it came packaged in a banana-yellow cartridge. The game was followed by Donkey Kong Land III, which was released in 1997.

The game has since been re-released via the Nintendo 3DS' Virtual Console and the Nintendo Classics service.

== Gameplay ==
Nintendo Power described the game as a conversion of Donkey Kong Country 2: Diddy's Kong Quest.

== Plot ==
Donkey Kong Land 2 stars Diddy Kong and Dixie Kong in their quest to rescue Donkey Kong from Kaptain K. Rool and the Kremling Krew. While its stage names and world themes are borrowed from Donkey Kong Country 2: Diddy's Kong Quest (except for Castle Crush, which became Dungeon Danger, and Haunted Hall, which became Krazy Koaster), the level designs are different.

Donkey Kong Land 2 had the same storyline from Donkey Kong Country 2: Diddy's Kong Quest. The manual contains a simplified version of the story from its SNES counterpart - K. Rool has kidnapped Donkey Kong and is at Crocodile Isle, and it's up to Diddy and Dixie to save him.

== Reception ==
Reception

Review scores
Publication	Score
Famitsu	6/10, 6/10, 6/10, 6/10 (GB)
GamePro	5/5 (GB)
Nintendo Life	7/10 (3DS)

By 1997, 1.5 million units had been sold worldwide.

Nintendo Power praised the gameplay and graphics but criticized the similarities between the levels and those of Donkey Kong Country 2. GamePro was positive to the game's side-scrolling action, hidden areas, music, and graphics.

Donkey Kong Land 2 was rated 79% at GameRankings based on five retrospective online reviews in the 2000s. Nintendojo gave the game 8.5 out of 10, but was critical of its save system. Nintendo Life praised the Virtual Console re-release, stating that the amount of content Rare managed to cram into the game but criticizing it for being similar to Diddy's SNES version.

== See also ==
- List of Donkey Kong video games
