= Kritter =

Kritter may refer to:

- Kritter, fictional characters from the Donkey Kong franchise
- Kritter (comics), a DC Comics character
