= List of Donkey Kong characters =

Promotional image for Donkey Kong Country 2: Diddy's Kong Quest. From left to right: Diddy Kong, Donkey Kong, Dixie Kong, Funky Kong, Cranky Kong, Wrinkly Kong and Swanky Kong.

Donkey Kong (Note: Japanese: ドンキーコング, Hepburn: Donkī Kongu) is a series of video games published by Nintendo since 1981 and created by game designer Shigeru Miyamoto. Donkey Kong and Mario have both had the roles of protagonist and antagonist in the series. Other characters have included other Kongs, the crocodilian villain King K. Rool, and supporting animal characters. This article lists the characters that have appeared in titles that revolve around Donkey Kong and the Kong family.

== Kongs ==
Kongs are a group of various simian primates that live on Donkey Kong Island. Members of the Kong Family (also known as the Kong Klan and the DK Crew), a group led by Donkey Kong comprising his family and friends, are the central characters or at least appear in all games in the series.

=== Donkey Kong ===
Donkey Kong, also known as DK, is a male gorilla. Donkey Kong was introduced in the original 1981 arcade game Donkey Kong as the computer-controlled antagonist who abducts Pauline. The player must take the role of Jumpman (Mario) and rescue her. Donkey Kong returned in Donkey Kong Jr., where he is held captive by Mario. Playing as Donkey Kong's son, Donkey Kong Jr., the player must rescue Donkey Kong. In Donkey Kong 3 (1983), Donkey Kong is once again the antagonist as he terrorises a greenhouse. In the Game & Watch game Donkey Kong Hockey, he served as a playable character for the first time.

The original Donkey Kong is a large, brown, angry gorilla, which Shigeru Miyamoto said was "nothing too evil or repulsive", and he's Mario's pet. Miyamoto has named "Beauty and the Beast" and King Kong as influences for the character. The name was derived by Miyamoto from "stubborn ape": Miyamoto used "donkey" to convey "stubborn" in English, while "Kong" was simply to imply him being a "large ape".

Donkey Kong's appearance has evolved over time. The character was redesigned for 1994's Donkey Kong and Donkey Kong Country, where he has darker brown hair and wears a red necktie with the letters "DK" on it. He subsequently appears at the end of DKC 2 and DKC 3. DK returns as a playable character in Donkey Kong 64, Jungle Beat, the Donkey Konga games, King of Swing, Jungle Climber, Donkey Kong Country Returns, and Tropical Freeze. He further appears in the Super Smash Bros., Mario vs. Donkey Kong, Mario Kart, Mario Party, and Mario sports games. The character was redesigned in 2025 with the release of Mario Kart World and Donkey Kong Bananza.

Donkey Kong has also appeared in a wide variety of related media and more generally in Western popular culture. In Saturday Supercade, Donkey Kong (voiced by Soupy Sales) has escaped from the circus and Mario (voiced by Peter Cullen) and Pauline (voiced by Judy Strangis) are chasing the ape. As with the original game, Donkey Kong will often grab Pauline and Mario has to save her. The original arcade version of Donkey Kong is the final villain in the 2015 film Pixels. Donkey Kong appears as a protagonist in the 2023 animated film The Super Mario Bros. Movie, where he is voiced by Seth Rogen. In November 2021, there were reports that Illumination had begun development on a Donkey Kong spin-off film, with Rogen set to reprise his role. The character makes a small cameo appearance in The Super Mario Galaxy Movie.

=== Cranky Kong ===
Cranky is a grumpy and elderly gorilla, known for his scathing fourth-wall-breaking commentary. The name "Donkey Kong" has been shared by several characters who in the in-game universe are shown to be distinct individuals. In particular, the Donkey Kong introduced as the main player character in 1994's Donkey Kong Country was said to be the grandson of the original arcade character, who is now the elderly Cranky Kong (Note: Japanese: クランキーコング, Hepburn: Kurankī Kongu) (additionally known as Donkey Kong Sr.), Cranky having relinquished his name to him. Confusingly, in Donkey Kong 64, Cranky repeatedly refers to the current Donkey Kong as his son rather than his grandson.

His main purpose in Donkey Kong Country is to give helpful hints to Donkey Kong and Diddy Kong whenever they drop by his cabin. He runs the Monkey Museum in Donkey Kong Country 2, although this time the player has to provide enough banana coins to buy specific hints. In Donkey Kong Country 3, he is the player's opponent in a throwing mini-game at Swanky's Sideshow; in the GBA versions of DKC 2 and DKC 3, he hosts several mini-games and is briefly playable in the Dojo mini-game of the latter. In Donkey Kong 64, Cranky deals out potions that grant each of the five playable Kongs special abilities. He also hosts the Jetpac game.

Cranky appears in Donkey Konga and its sequels. He dispenses tips in DK: King of Swing and DK: Jungle Climber. He is also playable in the latter game's multiplayer mode. He is playable in Donkey Kong Barrel Blast. In Donkey Kong Country Returns and its 3DS remake, he runs various shops that sell items and helps the player by giving hints and tips when they leave his shop. In Donkey Kong Country: Tropical Freeze (2014), Cranky becomes playable in the main campaign of a Donkey Kong platformer for the first time. His moveset is based around his cane, which allows him to bounce on spikes. Cranky is also in Donkey Kong Bananza. Cranky has additionally made a small cameo appearance on the Jungle Japes stage in the in Super Smash Bros. series.

Cranky Kong was a regular on the Donkey Kong Country television series, where he was voiced by Aron Tager, as well as by Ryūsei Nakao in the series' Japanese dub. Cranky Kong additionally appears in The Super Mario Bros. Movie, where he is voiced by Fred Armisen and depicted as the ruler of the Jungle Kingdom and Donkey Kong's father.

=== Donkey Kong Jr. ===
Donkey Kong Jr., (Note: Japanese: ドンキーコングJR., Hepburn: Donkī Kongu Junia) also known as DK Jr. or simply Junior, is the protagonist of the 1982 arcade game of the same name and the son of the original Donkey Kong. Junior wears a white singlet with a red letter "J" on it. His objective in the game is to save his father, who is imprisoned by Mario. He returns in the 1994 Game Boy game Donkey Kong, where he teams up with his father (who has kidnapped Pauline) against Mario. Junior also appeared as a playable character in Super Mario Kart, but was replaced by Donkey Kong in later installments. He was again playable in Mario Kart Tour. He also appeared in the Virtual Boy game Mario's Tennis (1995), and as an unlockable character in the Nintendo 64 version of Mario Tennis (2000).

Other appearances by Junior include the educational video game Donkey Kong Jr. Math (1983), Game & Watch games Donkey Kong Jr. (in wide-screen, tabletop and panorama versions) and Donkey Kong II, as well as the Game & Watch Gallery series compilations for Game Boy. He also appears as the physical appearance of the transformed king of World 4 in the Super NES version (1993) and Game Boy Advance version (2003) of Super Mario Bros. 3. Donkey Kong Junior had his own segment in the first season of Saturday Supercade and was voiced by Frank Welker.

Shortly before the release of Donkey Kong 64 in 1999, Leigh Loveday, the writer of Donkey Kong Country 2, stated that, as far as he knew, the modern Donkey Kong who appears in Donkey Kong Country onward is a grown-up version of Junior himself. However, in Donkey Kong Bananza, the description for the 8-Bit DK fossil alludes to "a certain Kong in the prime of his youth" passing his barrel-handling skills down to his descendants.

=== Diddy Kong ===
Diddy Kong is Donkey Kong's sidekick and nephew (or cousin) who first appeared in Donkey Kong Country (1994). He is also the main character in Donkey Kong Country 2: Diddy's Kong Quest after Donkey Kong is captured. He and Donkey Kong are captured in Donkey Kong Country 3, but he returns as a playable character in Donkey Kong 64, DK: King of Swing, Donkey Kong: Jungle Climber, the Donkey Konga series, Donkey Kong Country Returns, and Tropical Freeze. He makes an appearance in Donkey Kong Bananza alongside Dixie Kong.

He was given his own spin-off game Diddy Kong Racing and was playable in Donkey Kong Barrel Blast. He has been a playable character in several Mario Party, Mario Kart, and Mario sports games. Diddy was included as playable fighter in Super Smash Bros. Brawl, Super Smash Bros. 4, and Super Smash Bros. Ultimate.

The character was originally intended to be an updated version of Donkey Kong Jr., but Nintendo did not like this idea, suggesting either to give Junior his old look or else make Diddy Kong an entirely new character. Rare chose the latter and Diddy Kong was made.

=== Wrinkly Kong ===
Wrinkly Kong is an elderly gorilla, the wife of Cranky Kong. Wrinkly first appeared in the game Donkey Kong Country 2: Diddy's Kong Quest for the SNES, where she ran Kong Kollege. She gave the player advice and allowed the player to save their game. She appeared again in Donkey Kong Land 2. In Donkey Kong Country 3, she resided in 'Wrinkly's Save Cave', where the player could both save their game and deposit Banana Birds found throughout the game. This concept remained sans birds in Donkey Kong Land III, where she resided in 'Wrinkly Refuge'. In the Game Boy Advance version of Donkey Kong Country 3, Wrinkly was portrayed as a spiritual follower of the Banana Birds.

Wrinkly next appeared in Donkey Kong 64 as a ghost, having died since the events of Donkey Kong Country 3. She can be found behind the doors with her face on them.

Despite her death, Wrinkly's ghost has continued to appear in several games, including as an unlockable playable character in DK: King of Swing, Donkey Kong: Jungle Climber, and Donkey Kong Barrel Blast. She is voiced by Miho Yamada. She also appears as a trophy in Super Smash Bros. Brawl and Super Smash Bros. for Wii U.

=== Dixie Kong ===
Dixie Kong (Note: Japanese: ディクシーコング, Hepburn: Dikushī Kongu) is a young female chimpanzee with a ponytail that allows her to grasp objects, swing and glide. Her first appearance is Donkey Kong Country 2: Diddy's Kong Quest, where she and Diddy Kong partner as "inseparable friends" to rescue DK. Cranky refers to her as "that girlfriend of his." She was also playable in Donkey Kong Land 2.

Dixie later appeared as the protagonist of Donkey Kong Country 3: Dixie Kong's Double Trouble! and Donkey Kong Land III, with Kiddy Kong as her sidekick. Her next playable appearance was in Donkey Konga 2 on the GameCube, a bongo rhythm game. She appeared once again in the Japan-only Donkey Konga 3. She is a playable character in DK King of Swing for the Game Boy Advance, Diddy Kong Racing DS and Donkey Kong: Jungle Climber for the Nintendo DS, and Donkey Kong Barrel Blast for the Wii.

Dixie Kong has been playable in Mario Superstar Baseball, Mario Hoops 3-on-3 and Mario Super Sluggers. Additionally, she made her debut appearance in the Mario Kart series in Mario Kart Tour for mobile devices. Dixie Kong returned in Donkey Kong Country: Tropical Freeze for the Wii U and Nintendo Switch. She also makes an appearance in Donkey Kong Bananza as one of the racers in the Rambi Rumble at the Racing Layer along with Diddy Kong.

Dixie Kong has additionally featured in the Donkey Kong Country television series, where she was voiced by actress Stevie Vallance. She is currently voiced by Kahoru Sasajima. She has a cameo appearance in The Super Mario Bros. Movie.

=== Kiddy Kong ===
Kiddy Kong, known as Dinky Kong (Note: Japanese: ディンキーコング, Hepburn: Dinkī Kongu) in Japan, is a large three-year-old toddler gorilla that was introduced in Donkey Kong Country 3: Dixie Kong's Double Trouble! as Dixie's cousin. and the younger brother of Chunky Kong. His abilities include water skipping, rolling jumps, and throwing Dixie high out of normal jump range.

Kiddy Kong is also playable in Donkey Kong Land III, where he joins Dixie in her quest to prove herself worthy by finding the fabled Lost World before DK, Diddy, and the Kremlings. He does not appear in Donkey Kong 64, but is mentioned in the manual as being the baby brother of Chunky Kong. He appeared as a racer in the trailer for the cancelled Donkey Kong Racing. In Super Smash Bros. Ultimate, he appears as part of Dixie Kong's upgraded collectible Spirit.

=== Tiny Kong ===
Tiny Kong (Note: Japanese: タイニーコング, Hepburn: Tainī Kongu) is a young female chimpanzee with blonde hair put in pigtails who first appeared in Donkey Kong 64. She is Dixie Kong's younger sister and is a cousin to Chunky Kong and Kiddy Kong, as stated in the manual for Donkey Kong 64. She has the ability to shrink in size. She makes a cameo appearance in the Game Boy Advance ports of Donkey Kong Country 2 and Donkey Kong Country 3. In DKC 2, she must be rescued from the Zingers in a mini-game called Kongnapped. In DKC 3, she appears in one of Funky's Motorboat challenges.

Tiny was one of the confirmed characters in Donkey Kong Racing for the GameCube before its cancelation. In Diddy Kong Racing DS, she seems to have grown more mature, being both taller and more physically developed than her sister, Dixie. Her clothing now consists of a beanie hat, sweat pants, and a midriff-revealing spaghetti-strap top. She is one of the first eight playable characters. Her acceleration and handling are slightly below average, and she has a medium top speed.

She is an unlockable character in Donkey Kong Barrel Blast on the Wii. She was voiced by Kahoru Sasajima. Tiny Kong is also available as a playable character in Mario Super Sluggers. She makes a cameo appearance in Super Smash Bros. Ultimate as a Spirit using her artwork from Donkey Kong 64.

=== Chunky Kong ===
Chunky Kong (Note: Japanese: チャンキーコング, Hepburn: Chankī Kongu) is a large gorilla weighing 2,000 pounds and is one of the playable Kongs in the game Donkey Kong 64 where he is the largest of the playable Kongs. Chunky is the older brother of Kiddy Kong and cousin of Dixie Kong and Tiny Kong. Despite his brawny build, he acts somewhat cowardly and childish and lacks some intelligence, indicated by his speaking in third-person broken English. It is Chunky who ultimately defeats K. Rool in the last boxing match in Donkey Kong 64.

He makes a brief cameo appearance in the Game Boy Advance remake of Donkey Kong Country 3 in the third challenge of Funky's Rentals, where he is one of the Kongs that has to be rescued from the Kremlings' kidnapping, along with Candy, Tiny, and Cranky Kong.

He appears as a sticker in Super Smash Bros. Brawl. In Super Smash Bros. Ultimate, he appears as a Spirit using his artwork from Donkey Kong 64.

He has a cameo appearance in The Super Mario Bros. Movie.

=== Lanky Kong ===
Lanky Kong (Note: Japanese: ランキーコング, Hepburn: Rankī Kongu) is a buffoonish orangutan with neither style nor grace, who is a distant cousin to the Kong family. Lanky's first appearance was in Donkey Kong 64 as one of the game's five playable Kongs. Lanky Kong's defining characteristics are his long, slim arms, as well as his generally comical appearance. Lanky additionally appears as a non-player character in the Game Boy Advance version of Donkey Kong Country 3. Lanky's last appearance was in Donkey Kong Barrel Blast (2007). He was voiced by Kentaro Tone. The likeness of Lanky Kong appears as a trophy in Super Smash Bros. Brawl and Super Smash Bros. for Wii U, as well as a collectible Spirit in Super Smash Bros. Ultimate. Lanky Kong is additionally visible on a poster in New Donk City in Donkey Kong Bananza.

=== Candy Kong ===
Candy Kong (Note: Japanese: キャンディーコング, Hepburn: Kyandī Kongu) is a female gorilla and Donkey Kong's girlfriend. Candy Kong first appeared in Donkey Kong Country wearing a pink leotard and providing save point stations throughout the game. In the Game Boy Advance version of DKC, Candy hosts a dancing minigame. She returned in Donkey Kong 64 selling musical instruments. Candy was redesigned, now wearing a crop top, shorts and sneakers.

She additionally makes a brief appearance in DK: King of Swing, and is seen cheering on the player characters. She wears a pink bikini top and short shorts and her torso was redesigned. In the GBC and GBA versions of Donkey Kong Country, Candy runs challenges and a dance studio respectively.

In the Game Boy Advance remake of Donkey Kong Country 2 she appears as a model and assistant on Swanky Kong's quiz show, and she wore a purple dress. She also made a brief appearance in Donkey Kong Barrel Blast in the mode Candy's Challenges.

In a 1995 manga from Comic BomBom, Mario sees Candy wearing a swimsuit and a mask concealing her species, and is infatuated by her.

Candy was additionally a regular on the Donkey Kong Country television series, voiced by Joy Tanner. Instead of being blonde as seen in the games, she has fiery red hair. She works at a barrel factory run by Bluster Kong, her boss.

She was going to be a playable character in Diddy Kong Pilot before its cancelation. She was voiced by Satsuki Tsuzumi in video games.

=== Funky Kong ===
Funky Kong (Note: Japanese: ファンキーコング, Hepburn: Fankī Kongu) is a cool surfer and mechanic gorilla. In Donkey Kong Country and DKC 2, his flight service allows the Kongs to go back to worlds they have previously completed. In the Game Boy Advance version of DKC, he hosts a fishing minigame. In Donkey Kong Country 3: Dixie Kong's Double Trouble!, he takes on the role of a vehicle merchant, allowing Dixie Kong and Kiddy Kong to reach new worlds in the game. In Donkey Kong 64, Funky runs an army surplus store. He is additionally a playable character in Donkey Kong Barrel Blast, as well as in multiplayer modes of Donkey Konga 3, DK: King of Swing and DK: Jungle Climber. He is currently voiced by Toshihide Tsuchiya.

Funky is additionally a regular on the Donkey Kong Country animated series, where he was voiced by Damon D'Oliveira and speaks with a Jamaican accent.

Funky resurfaces as a shopkeeper in Donkey Kong Country: Tropical Freeze. In the Nintendo Switch version, Funky is a playable character and headlines the eponymous "Funky Mode" exclusive to that port. In Funky Mode, Funky Kong has extra health and other perks such as double-jumping and standing on spikes without taking damage. Players can switch between Donkey Kong and Funky while playing in Funky Mode.

Funky additionally appears as an unlockable heavyweight character in Mario Kart Wii, where he was one of the most popular characters to use for online play and world records. He was a playable character in Mario Super Sluggers for the Wii. In Super Smash Bros. Ultimate, he runs a shop in the game's story mode and can be unlocked as a spirit. Additionally, he appears as a playable character in Mario Kart Tour and Mario Kart 8 Deluxe as a part of the game's Booster Course Pass.

=== Swanky Kong ===
Swanky Kong (Note: Japanese: スワンキーコング, Hepburn: Suwankī Kongu) is a gorilla and an entrepreneur. He first appears as the host of "Swanky's Bonus Bonanza" in Donkey Kong Country 2: Diddy's Kong Quest in which Diddy and Dixie must answer questions about the game correctly to win extra lives. The questions range from easy ones such as enemies and worlds featured in the game to more difficult ones such as objects in the background of levels. In the game, he wears a blue oversized jacket and has an afro hair style.

Swanky runs Swanky's Sideshow in Donkey Kong Country 3: Dixie Kong's Double Trouble! This time, he wears a white long-sleeved shirt, a gold vest, a bowler hat, black pants, black and white shoes, and has a diamond-topped cane.

In the Game Boy Advance version of Donkey Kong Country 2, Swanky's role remains the same except that he now has Candy as his assistant. Upon completing all of his quizzes, Swanky will reward the player with a photo of himself to add to the scrapbook. In the GBA version of Donkey Kong Country 3, Swanky sports his Donkey Kong Country 2 look and now runs Swanky's Dash, a virtual reality game where stars can be collected as Dixie. If enough stars are collected, Swanky will give the player Bear Coins, Banana Bunches, and Extra Life Balloons.

=== Other Kongs ===
- In Donkey Kong Country, enemy orangutans known as Manky Kong appear. They attack the protagonists by throwing barrels. The game's manual describes the Manky Kongs as "Kong reject orangutans."
- The Kings of the Fruit Kingdoms are a group of Kongs from Donkey Kong Jungle Beat who rule their respective territories in the Fruit Kingdoms and have invaded Donkey Kong's home turf. DK must battle these Kongs by using conventional fighting methods like punching and kicking.
  - Ghastly King, the head of the group, is a giant and shadowy Kong-like figure who serves as the ruler of the Fruit Kingdoms. It is implied that he put a spell on the other Evil Kings in order to defeat DK. After Ghastly King is defeated, DK becomes the new ruler of the Fruit Kingdoms and Dread Kong, Karate Kong, Ninja Kong and Sumo Kong accept his leadership and congratulate him.
  - Dread Kong is the ruler of the Banana Kingdom who sports dreadlocks and uses punch attacks. He is the weakest of the four Kongs controlled by Ghastly King. After appearing in Jungle Beat, Dread Kong reappears in Donkey Kong Jungle Fever and Donkey Kong Banana Kingdom, the two medal games based on Jungle Beat.
  - Karate Kong is the ruler of the Pineapple Kingdom who is an expert at karate. He reappears in Jungle Fever and Banana Kingdom. He also appears as a Spirit in Super Smash Bros. Ultimate. His Spirit is represented by Ryu from the Street Fighter series.
  - Ninja Kong is the ruler of the Durian Kingdom and a practitioner of ninjitsu. He reappears in Jungle Fever and Banana Kingdom. In Super Smash Bros. Ultimate, Ninja Kong appears as a Spirit that is embodied by Donkey Kong.
  - Sumo Kong is the ruler of the Star Fruit Kingdom who is an expert sumo wrestler. He is the largest and strongest of the four Kongs controlled by Ghastly King. He reappears in Jungle Fever and Banana Kingdom.
- Void Co. (short for Void Company) is an organization of Kongs that appear in Donkey Kong Bananza. They target the Banandium Gems that are underground and run afoul of Donkey Kong and Pauline.
  - Void Kong is the central antagonist of Donkey Kong Bananza. He is a marmoset who is the president of Void Co. that uses a banana-shaped hovercraft as his means of transportation and was also responsible for turning Pauline into Odd Rock. He is fought twice in the game during the game.
  - Poppy Kong is a fashion-obsessed but compassionate lutung who is the Director of Intelligence at Void Co. She is often wearing expensive clothes and lipstick and abused by Void.
  - Grumpy Kong is a burly orangutan who is the Director of Manufacturing at Void Co. that often creates monsters to serve the company.

== Recurring antagonists ==
=== Kremlings ===
The Kremlings (Note: Japanese: クレムリン, Hepburn: Kuremurin) are an advanced crocodilian species native to Crocodile Isle and led by King K. Rool. All Kremlings are part of the Kremling Krew that antagonizes the Kongs, with the exception of K. Lumsy, who opens up levels for the Kongs in Donkey Kong 64. When Crocodile Isle is destroyed, the Kremling remnants building several bases in the Northern Kremisphere until they are regrouped by KAOS (which is K. Rool acting in the shadows). The Kremlings returned to the Donkey Kong franchise in Donkey Kong Bananza, acting as enemies after King K. Rool is revealed.

The Kremlings were originally conceived for a game called Jonny Blastoff and the Kremling Armada, an unreleased point-and-click adventure game that predated Donkey Kong Country.

- King K. Rool is the main antagonist of the Donkey Kong series. He is an obese green crocodile who is the leader of the Kremling Krew. He uses numerous aliases across the series, going by Kaptain K. Rool in DKC 2 and Baron K. Roolenstein in DKC 3. He returns in Donkey Kong 64, King of Swing, and DK: Jungle Climber. He return in Donkey Kong Bananza. He is a playable character in Super Smash Bros. Ultimate.
- Klumps (Note: Japanese: クランプ, Hepburn: Kuranpu) are large, rotund members of the Kremling Krew and appear as King K. Rool's second-in-command in various Donkey Kong games. In Donkey Kong Country, a Klump is ordered by K. Rool to steal the Banana Hoard from underneath Donkey Kong's Treehouse. The Klump knocks out Diddy with his "enormous bulk" and instructs the Kremlings to stuff him in a barrel and take off with the bananas. Klump's main outfit is a green military helmet, belt, and boots. Due to their helmets, they are invincible to Diddy's jump. According to the manual for Donkey Kong Country 2: Diddy's Kong Quest, the Klumps appear as their pirate alter-ego Kannon. They are armed with a cannon that allows them shoot barrels and "Kannonballs." Without their helmets, Klumps are now vulnerable to Diddy and Dixie Kong's attacks. In Donkey Kong 64, Klumps reappear and are depicted as much larger enemies with a pink coloration. They attack by throwing green unripe Orange Grenades at the Kongs, and the only way to defeat them is by using a shockwave attack or by throwing an Orange Grenade. In the game's introduction sequence, a Klump is ordered by King K. Rool to distract Donkey Kong by stealing the Golden Bananas and kidnapping the Kong Family so that K. Rool can repair his Blast-O-Matic weapon. A single Klump appears as a playable character in Donkey Kong Barrel Blast. Klump now wears a bucket on his head, and has a brown skin coloration. He shares stats with his rival Lanky Kong. Klump was slated to be a playable character in Diddy Kong Pilot before it was cancelled. In the Donkey Kong Country television series, a Klump serves as King K. Rool's second-in-command and is referred to as General Klump, voiced by Adrian Truss.
- Krushas (Note: Japanese: クラッシャ, Hepburn: Kurassha) are blue Kremlings known for their supreme strength. Due to their strength, only Donkey Kong can defeat them in Donkey Kong Country and Donkey Kong Land. There is a silver variant that is impervious to all attacks. They appear in DKC 2 in pirate gear as Krunchas. Like the previous game, they cannot be defeated with regular attacks, and attempting to attack them will result in Kruncha becoming enraged. Krunchas also appear unchanged in Donkey Kong Land 2. Krushas do not appear in Donkey Kong Country 3: Dixie Kong's Double Trouble!, but similar enemies known as Krumples appear in their place. Krusha appears as a secret playable multiplayer character in Donkey Kong 64. He has an orange grenade launcher, and he has a sliding ability, similar to Tiny Kong. Similar enemies known as Kasplats appear in the main game. While Krusha does not appear in Donkey Kong Barrel Blast, a similar blue-skinned character by the name Kludge does. In the US version of Super Smash Bros. Brawl, Krunchas and Krumples are mentioned in Kludge's trophy description. In the Donkey Kong Country television series, a Krusha appears as King K. Rool's bodyguard, voiced by Len Carlson.
- Kalypso (Note: Japanese: カリプソ, Hepburn: Karipuso) is a female member of the Kremlings. She appears in Donkey Kong Barrel Blast where she serves as Tiny Kong's rival.
- Kritters (Note: Japanese: クリッター, Hepburn: Kurittā) are common enemies in the Donkey Kong franchise and are the main foot soldiers of the Kremling Krew. In the first Donkey Kong Country game, they are usually seen either walking or jumping. Kritters known as Krash appear riding minecarts in the minecart stages. In Donkey Kong Country 2, Kritters are dressed as pirates and outfitted with peg legs. Those who walk are named Klomp and have one peg, while the jumpers are named Kaboing and have two. The Kritters in Donkey Kong Country 3 lack clothing and are called Kobble. A single leather jacket-wearing Kritter known as Krunch appears as a playable character in Diddy Kong Racing. In Donkey Kong 64, Kritters are redesigned and appear sporting leather jackets and belt buckles with skulls on them. A pair of Kritters are seen piloting K. Rool's Mechanical Island, chasing after one of the Kongs, and serving as referees during the final battle. Krashes in Donkey Kong 64 were redesigned to be much more muscular and wielding clubs. Skeletal and robotic variants of Kritters also appear in Donkey Kong 64. In DK: King of Swing, Kritters appear as enemies in the main game mode and as a playable character in the game's multiplayer mode. In King of Swing and Jungle Climber they appear more muscular. A single Kritter appears as racer in Donkey Kong Barrel Blast, sharing the same balanced stats as his rival Donkey Kong. Kritters appeared as spectators in Mario Power Tennis. In the Mario Strikers series, a Kritter serves as a goalie for each team (except Mario Strikers: Battle League). A Robo-Kritter serves as the goalie for a robotic team in Super Mario Strikers. In Mario Super Sluggers, Kritters appear as playable characters and members of the DK Wilds team. Kritters appeared as trophies in Super Smash Bros. Brawl, Super Smash Bros. for Nintendo 3DS and Super Smash Bros. for Wii U, as well as stickers in Brawl. They additionally appeared as enemies in the 3DS exclusive Smash Run mode. They appear in the Donkey Kong Country television series, reprising their roles from the games.
- Klaptraps (Note: Japanese: クラップトラップ, Hepburn: Kurapputorappu) or Klap Traps appear in Donkey Kong Country and are recurring enemies in the series. They closely resemble the enemy known as Snapjaw from the arcade game Donkey Kong Jr. They appear as small crocodiles with large mouths and come in a variety of colors, but most commonly blue. Similar enemies known as Klampons appear in Donkey Kong Country 2 and Krimps appear in Donkey Kong Country 3. Klaptraps appear as stage hazards and as a collectable trophies in the Super Smash Bros. series. They also serve as Assist Trophies in Super Smash Bros. Ultimate. They appear as hazards and enemies in Mario Power Tennis, Mario Superstar Baseball and Mario Party 7. Klaptraps also appear in the Donkey Kong Country television series. A large Klaptrap known as Jr. Klap Trap or simply Jr. appears as a minor character in the TV series, voiced by Ron Rubin.

=== Baddies ===
Many different animal species (birds, mammals, insects, fish, other reptiles, etc.) reinforce K. Rool and his army. These enemies are typically called "baddies" throughout the franchise.

- Oil Drum - In the original game, Country, Land, and Mario vs Donkey Kong 2: March of the Minis, Oil Drums produce fire and enemies that can harm the player character. Country also features an Oil Drum boss named Dumb Drum.
- Nitpicker - Nitpickers or simply "Birds" appear in Donkey Kong Jr., Donkey Kong Jr. Math, Donkey Kong for Game Boy, March of the Minis, and Minis March Again.
- Snapjaw - group of anthropomorphic metal foothold traps with a powerful bite first appearing as vine-climbing enemies in Donkey Kong Junior. In Captain N: The Game Master, they have the outer appearance of piranhas, which carries into their appearance in Country 2. The character appears in a past setting in Yoshi's Island DS, climbing vines and only featuring in stages with Baby DK. Klaptrap is visually similar to the original incarnation of Snapjaw.
- Gnawty - A race of beavers that appears in Donkey Kong Country, Donkey Kong Land, and Donkey Kong 64. Very Gnawty and Really Gnawty are bosses. The beaver fossils in Bananza act as a visual reference to Gwanty.
- Army - A race of armadillos that appears in Donkey Kong Country, Donkey Kong Land and Bananza. One Army serves as a boss in Donkey Kong 64.
- Necky - A race of vultures that appear in DKC, DKL, DKC 2, DKL 2, King of Swing, Jungle Climber, Barrel Blast, and Bananza. Master Necky and Master Necky Sr. are bosses. Mini-Necky spits out nuts. In DKC 2, Neek is a similar enemy and Krow is a boss character. Fire Necky is a Phoenix-like variant in DK: King of Swing.
- Zinger - A race of hornets from a large and complex hive on Crocodile Isle. They appear in DKC, DKL, DKC 2, DKL 2, DK64, DK: King of Swing, and Bananza. They are referred to as Buzz in DKC 3. Their monarchs are the bosses Queen B and King Zing.

=== Tiki Tak Tribe ===
The Tiki Tak Tribe are a primitive group of Tiki-like demons resembling musical instruments who are the main antagonists in Donkey Kong Country Returns and its 3DS remake. Emerging from a volcanic eruption at the start of the game, the higher-ranking members of the Tiki Tak Tribe use hypnosis-inducing harmonic patterns on Donkey Kong Island's wildlife (consisting of elephants, giraffes, zebras and squirrels) to seize any banana in sight, even from Donkey Kong's banana hoard, forcing him to retrieve it with the help of Diddy Kong. Several different Tikis appear as collectible trophies in Super Smash Bros. for Nintendo 3DS and Wii U, as well as a group 'Tiki Tak Tribe' Spirit in Super Smash Bros. Ultimate

- The tribe is led by Tiki Tong, a gigantic and drum-like Tiki. Eons before the events of Returns, Tiki Tong was responsible for the creation of Donkey Kong Island through the use of his power to create volcanic eruptions before establishing his reign, in which he created his tribe across the entire island and enslaved its wildlife. His tyranny ended when the Kongs provoke a rebellion, imprisoning him in the island's volcano, along with his subjects, as the island is claimed by the Kongs. As the game begins, Tong resurfaces and tries to take back the island. Before the final battle against Tiki Tong, it is revealed that the Tikis use bananas as an energy source; Tong generates a pair of hands by grinding the remainder of the bananas they acquired and spewing their juice onto his commanders.
- Krazy Kalimba is the first of the Tiki Tak Tribe's commanders seen in the game and the most prominent in its advertising, being a small Tiki toned in red and light blue paint and a crown of wooden tines atop his head evocative of the keys of his namesake instrument. He unsuccessfully tries to hypnotize Donkey Kong with his tribe's spell before getting pummeled and knocked out of DK's treehouse into the island's jungle. When later confronted, Kalimba hypnotizes and takes control of the game's first boss Mugly to combat the Kongs, only to be defeated and punched into the distance once more.
- The Maraca Gang are a trio of otherwise unnamed Tikis resembling feather-adorned maracas and the second of the Tiki Tak Tribe's commanders. Donkey and Diddy Kong encounter them at the island's beach, where they hypnotize and possess a trio of crab pirates known as the Scurvy Crew to combat the Kongs.
- Gong-Oh is the third Tiki commander, resembling a wooden slab bearing a metal gong with a sun emblem on it and arms resembling percussion mallets. Appearing in the island's ruins, he hypnotizes and possesses a large egg in a golden cauldron which hatches into a bomb-dropping bird named Stu to combat the Kongs.
- Banjo Bottom is the fourth Tiki commander, resembling a banjo adorned with gold feathers. He leads Donkey Kong Island's local mole miners in transporting bananas across it and, when confronted by the Kongs, he forces their train hauling them to depart immediately, hypnotizing and possessing the moles' leader Mole Miner Max to fight back.
- Wacky Pipes is the fifth Tiki commander, being a wooden sphere adorned with ropes, cyan, blue and gold feathers and a trio of flute-like pipes protruding from his head. He lurks up in the treetops of the island's forest and, upon seeing the Kongs infiltrating his base, he hypnotizes and possesses a large plant-like and electrokinetic caterpillar named Mangoruby in an ill-fated attempt to combat them.
- Xylobone is the sixth Tiki commander, resembling a trilobite-like xylophone with hands similar to Gong-Oh's. Upon Donkey and Diddy Kong's arrival to his part of the island's cliffs, he disembarks from one of his tribe's airships to hypnotize and possesses Thugly, a relative of Mugly, to combat them.
- Cordian is the seventh and final Tiki commander outside of Tiki Tong, who has the bellows of an accordion topped with an orange feather on his head. He runs the factory near the Tiki Tak Tribe's base, where he oversees a mass production of his tribe's soldiers by means of filling empty wooden husks with mashed-up bananas. When confronted by Donkey and Diddy Kong, he hypnotizes and possesses Colonel Pluck, a chicken controlling his Stompybot 3000 mech used for the banana mashing, to try and stop them.
- Tiki Goons are drum-like Tikis that serve as the Tiki Tak Tribe's most common foot soldiers. They make a cameo appearance in Mario Kart 7 on the track DK Jungle where they attack players and make them drop coins. They reappear in Mario Kart 8 and Mario Kart 8 Deluxe, performing the same function.

=== Snowmads ===
The Snowmads' insignia, a snowflake

The Snowmads are an organization of hegemonic Chionophile seafarers based on stereotypical depictions of Vikings that are the main antagonists of Donkey Kong Country: Tropical Freeze. They have claimed Donkey Kong Island as their territory, which leads Donkey Kong, Diddy Kong, Dixie Kong and Cranky Kong to reclaim it. In Super Smash Bros. for Nintendo 3DS and Wii U, several members of the Snowmads appear as collectible trophies.

Lord Fredrik, the Snowmad King is a large and obese walrus who is the Snowmads' leader. He possesses an enchanted blowing horn that he first used in throwing Donkey Kong Island into a state of perpetual winter to initiate the Snowmads' invasion of it. Fredrik additionally appears as a Spirit in Super Smash Bros. Ultimate that is embodied by King K. Rool.

== Animal Friends ==
Animal Friends, additionally known as the Animal Buddies, Amicable Animals and Jungle Buddies, are friendly animals who the Kongs can ride, transform into or have perform various tasks. Among the known Animal Friends are:

- Rambi - An Indian rhinoceros who can ram through enemies and walls. Rambi is featured in Donkey Kong Country, Donkey Kong Land, DKC 2, DKL 2, 64, Barrel Blast, Returns, Tropical Freeze and Bananza. Baby rhinos strongly resembling Rambi called RamRams appear in Mario vs. Donkey Kong. In Mario Kart DS, Donkey Kong's first exclusive kart, the Rambi Rider, has Rambi's head on it.
- Expresso - A sneaker-wearing common ostrich who can run fast and fly for a short amount of time. Expresso is featured in Kong Kong Country, Donkey Kong Land, and a mini-game in the Game Boy Advance re-release of DKC 2.
- Winky - A frog who can jump higher than the Kongs and defeat more types of enemies with his jump attacks. He appears in Donkey Kong Country.
- Enguarde - A swordfish with a thrust attack who appears in Donkey Kong Country, DKC 2, DKC 3, Donkey Kong Land 2, DKL 3, Donkey Kong 64, and Barrel Blast.
- Squawks - A parrot who appears in most of Rare's Donkey Kong platformers. In DKC and DK64, he carries a spotlight to increase visibility in dark levels. In his other appearances, he can carry Kongs through the air and spit eggs to defeat enemies. Squawks appears as a usable item in Barrel Blast, DKC Returns, and Tropical Freeze.
- Squitter - A sneaker-wearing spider who can shoot webs and create web platforms to walk across gaps and avoid hazards. Squitter was featured in Donkey Kong Country 2, Donkey Kong Land 2, DKC 3, and DKL 3.
- Rattly - A rattlesnake from Donkey Kong Country 2. Rattly can coil up and bounce high, and the Kongs can also ride him.
- Clapper - A seal from Donkey Kong Country 2. His arctic breath can cool and freeze water.
- Glimmer - A bioluminescent anglerfish Donkey Kong Country 2. He can shine a spotlight to increase visibility in dark underwater levels.
- Quawks - A parrot who first appeared as a purple version of Squawks in Donkey Kong Country 2. He can only carry the Kongs in a slow descent while avoiding obstacles. He reappears in DKC 3 where he is now dark purple and gains the ability to fly anywhere and pick up and throw barrels. Quawks is also featured as a usable item in Barrel Blast.
- Ellie - An African elephant from Donkey Kong Country 3. She can carry barrels and squirt water that she sucks up. Ellie is afraid of mice like Sneeks so the Kongs must have her pick up a barrel and toss it at the mice to eliminate them. In later games, Ellie does not have a fear of mice.
- Parry - A pheasant-like Parallel Bird from Donkey Kong Country 3. Once found, he flies above wherever the players go, collecting out-of-reach objects. He can also defeat certain enemies, such as "Booty Birds", but is vulnerable to others like the mechanical "Buzzes".
- Lightfish - A tadpole-like fish from DK64. It has a light that shines when the Kongs are in the shipwrecks in Gloomy Galleon.
- Hoofer - A wildebeest from Jungle Beat. Like Rambi, Hoofer can ram into barriers and enemies.
- Orco - An orca from Jungle Beat. Like Enguarde, Orco can smash through underwater barriers and enemies.
- Flurl - A red squirrel from Jungle Beat. By grabbing its tail, Flurl can act like a parachute.
- Helibird - Coming in several color variations in Jungle Beat, these birds can be used to fly.
- Professor Chops (referred to as Tutorial Pig in Returns) - A pig who appears in the Retro Studios-developed Country titles. He serves as a middle-gate to save Donkey Kong's progress in a level. In Returns exclusively, if DK loses most of his lives, the professor offers his help to complete the level. Also, he gives tips and tricks while Donkey Kong is near an obstacle as well as giving tips to the Kongs.
- Whale - An unnamed sperm whale from Donkey Kong Returns. It only appeared in the level "Blowhole Bound" where Donkey Kong and Diddy Kong free it from an anchor and it gives them a ride along the shores of Donkey Kong Island.
- Tawks - A red parrot from the Nintendo Switch version of Tropical Freeze. He replaces Funky Kong at Funky's Fly 'n' Buy whenever he is journeying with the other Kongs.

== Supporting characters ==
=== Mario ===
Mario, (Note: Japanese: マリオ, Hepburn: Mario) originally known as Jumpman, (Note: Japanese: ジャンプマン, Hepburn: Janpuman) appeared as the player character in Donkey Kong. He was the antagonist in Donkey Kong Jr., and further appeared as playable in Donkey Kong Hockey. He returns as a platforming protagonist in Mario vs. Donkey Kong and is ostensibly the one controlling the Mini-Mario toys in its sequels.

=== Pauline ===
Pauline, (Note: Japanese: ポリーン, Hepburn: Porīn) originally known as Lady, (Note: Japanese: レディ, Hepburn: Redi) was created by Shigeru Miyamoto and other developers for the 1981 arcade game Donkey Kong. She also appeared in the 1994 Game Boy game of the same name as well as Mario vs. Donkey Kong 2: March of the Minis and its sequels. Pauline is the earliest example of a female with a speaking role in a video game, and is cited as a famous example of a damsel in distress in fiction. In 2017, Super Mario Odyssey marked her debut in the Super Mario series, serving as the mayor of New Donk City. Since then, she has appeared in several other Mario titles. A 13-year old Pauline appears in Donkey Kong Bananza where she was revealed to have been turned into Odd Rock by Void Kong.

=== Stanley ===
Stanley, (Note: Japanese: スタンリー, Hepburn: Sutanrī) sometimes called Stanley the Bugman, is an exterminator and the protagonist of Donkey Kong 3. Stanley has only made one other prominent appearance as the protagonist of the Game & Watch game Greenhouse, in which he sprays worms attacking his plants. Greenhouse was re-released in Game & Watch Gallery 3, but the modern version stars Yoshi instead. Stanley also appears in Donkey Kong 3 microgames in both WarioWare: Twisted! and WarioWare: Touched! and a trophy of him can be obtained in the game Super Smash Bros. Melee. He also appeared in the Saturday Supercade cartoon.

=== Brothers Bear ===
The Brothers Bear are a race of anthropomorphic bears who live in the Northern Kremisphere in Donkey Kong Country 3: Dixie Kong's Double Trouble! There are 15 of them located throughout the Northern Kremisphere.

- Bazaar - A brown bear who runs a general store in the Northern Kremisphere. He has the most dialogue out of the Brothers Bear. He mentions having met Link once.
- Barnacle - A grizzly bear that lives on an island in the middle of Lake Orangatanga. He is a former scuba diver and sailor. In the GBA version, he was moved to Pacifica.
- Brash - A boastful brown bear that lives in Kremwood Forest. He is an athlete who is at his happiest when he is undefeated in a sport.
- Blunder - A grizzly bear that lives in a booth (library in the GBA remake) within Kremwood Forest. In his rude ramblings, he often lets clues slip to where the Lost World of Krematoa can be found.
- Blue - A blue bear who lives in a beach house in Cotton Top Cove. He has a sad personality, especially when he claims that no one came to his birthday party. The Kongs manage to cheer him up by giving him a birthday present that Blizzard has them deliver.
- Bramble - A brown bear that lives in a cabin near Cotton Top Cove. He is a botanist who has an interest in plants and flowers.
- Brigadier Bazooka - A grizzly bear who lives in his barracks on Mekanos Island. He is an old war veteran who fought in the Kremean War. His prized possession is a huge cannon named Big Bessie.
- Blizzard - A polar bear who lives in a base camp at the top of K3 and is best friends with Blue. In the Game Boy Advance remake, he's a grizzly bear.
- Barter - A brown bear who lives in his shop near K3.
- Benny - A polar bear who operates one of the chairlifts at Razor Ridge. He is the twin brother of Björn and was named after Benny Andersson of ABBA.
- Björn - A polar bear who operates one of the chairlifts at Razor Ridge. He is the twin brother of Benny and was named after Björn Ulvaeus of ABBA.
- Baffle - A brown bear who lives in his code room in KAOS Kore.
- Boomer - A grizzly bear who lives in his bomb shelter in Krematoa. He is a demolition expert and only collects Bonus coins. The Kongs need to talk to him to clear the paths to each stage in Krematoa.
- Bear - A black bear who is exclusive to Donkey Kong Land III. He runs a Sheepy Shop in each location.
- Bachelor - A brown bear who is exclusive to the Game Boy Advance version of Donkey Kong Country 3 and lives on the island at the center of Lake Orangatanga where Barnacle used to live in the original game.

=== Introduced in Diddy Kong Racing ===
Diddy Kong Racing (1997) for the Nintendo 64 introduced several characters to the Donkey Kong franchise, some of which have appeared in other games by Rare. While Nintendo lost intellectual property rights to most of them in 2002, estranging them from Donkey Kong, they reappear in the Nintendo DS remake Diddy Kong Racing DS in 2007, except Banjo and Conker, who were replaced by Dixie and Tiny.

- Timber - A tiger whose parents go on holiday to Donkey Kong Island and leave him in charge of their home, Timber's Island, prompting Timber and his friends to organize a race. This is interrupted when a sinister intergalactic pig-wizard named Wizpig arrives at Timber's Island and attempts to take it over after having conquered his own planet. Timber hires a team of eight racers: Diddy Kong, Conker, Banjo, Krunch, Tiptup, T.T., Pipsy, and Bumper to defeat Wizpig. Timber later establishes a hip-hop career. Timber was originally intended to be the main protagonist of a fourth entry of the R.C. Pro-Am series, titled Pro-Am 64. Miyamoto suggested adding Diddy Kong to the game and making him the main character.
- Drumstick - A rooster and the best racer on Timber's island, he is transformed into a frog by Wizpig's magic. After Wizpig is defeated, Drumstick is turned back into a rooster and unlocked as a racer.
- Conker the Squirrel - Conker is a squirrel and friend of Diddy Kong whom he recruited to defeat Wizpig. Conker debuted in Diddy Kong Racing as a promotion for the upcoming game Twelve Tales: Conker 64. After the release of Conker's Pocket Tales (1999) for Game Boy Color, Twelve Tales was retooled for an older audience, becoming Conker's Bad Fur Day (2001), and Conker was reimagined as a fourth-wall breaking alcoholic armed with guns and knives. In 2002, Microsoft acquired Rare, causing Nintendo to lose the rights to the character. In a later exegesis in reference to Diddy Kong Racing, Conker states that "things were different back then, you know, I was different - it goes without saying that you wouldn't catch me hanging out with any of those freaks these days".
- Banjo - Banjo is a bear and friend of Diddy Kong whom he recruited to defeat Wizpig. Banjo made his debut as a playable character as part of the cast of Diddy Kong Racing to promote the forthcoming release of Banjo-Kazooie (1998); the game was followed by several further Banjo-Kazooie games. Microsoft acquired the Banjo franchise in 2002 as part of Rare. In 2019, Banjo and his friend Kazooie were revealed as part of the first Fighter Pass for Super Smash Bros. Ultimate in a trailer set at Donkey Kong's treehouse, acknowledging Banjo's origins in the Kongs' world.
- Krunch - A Kremling and Diddy's enemy, he wasn't contacted by Timber, but he follows after Diddy and company anyway to find out what they are doing and to make sure that they aren't plotting against the Kremlings, but he ultimately ends up aiding the group in their adventure to save Timber's Island from Wizpig. The Kritters in Donkey Kong 64 were designed to have some resemblance to Krunch. Krunch is the only character created for Diddy Kong Racing whose rights were retained by Nintendo in the Microsoft acquisition.
- Tiptup - A turtle with a nervous personality who lives on Timber's Island. Tiptup reappears in Banjo-Kazooie inside "Tanktup's Shell" in Bubblegloop Swamp with his own choir. Tiptup can also be found in Banjo-Tooie in the Turtle View Cave in Jolly Roger's Lagoon. He states that he has nineteen daughters; Banjo-Tooie depicts the birth of his first son. Tiptup also makes a cameo appearance in Banjo-Pilot, where he can be found in Clanker's River.
- T.T. - A living stopwatch who lives on Timber's Island and is in charge of the race courses.
- Pipsy - A mouse who lives on Timber's Island. The design of Pipsy was originally intended for the main character of a game called Astro Mouse, which was cancelled. This character was redesigned by Kevin Bayliss and included in Diddy Kong Racing as Pipsy. She was the sole female among the cast until Diddy Kong Racing DS when Dixie and Tiny Kong became playable, replacing Conker and Banjo, respectively.
- Bumper - A badger who lives on Timber's Island. In May 2012, Bumper is serving time in prison. He later makes parole, and is superficially remorseful for his actions.
- Taj - An Indian elephant-like genie residing on the island who aids Diddy and his friends. He is a playable racer in Diddy Kong Racing DS.
- Tricky - A Triceratops who is one of Timber's Island's four guardians. He is the first boss in Diddy Kong Racing. A character named Prince Tricky in Star Fox Adventures was originally intended to be the same character as the Tricky in Diddy Kong Racing. Nintendo now owns the rights to the Prince Tricky incarnation of the character.
- Wizpig - The main antagonist of Diddy Kong Racing. He is a porcine extraterrestrial and wizard from the planet Future Fun Land who seeks to conquer an island. Wizpig turns the island's four guardians (Tricky the Triceratops, Bluey the Walrus, Bubbler the Octopus and Smokey the Dragon) into his henchmen. Ultimately, the rocket he rides on malfunctions and launches him to the moon, but an additional cutscene reveals Wizpig's spaceship flying through the sky, unscathed. He is a playable racer in Diddy Kong Racing DS.

== Playable characters in the Donkey Kong series ==
This table catalogues appearances of characters that have been playable in the Donkey Kong series. An animal friend being merely ridable is considered here as a non-playable appearance, while a Kong transforming into the animal is considered the animal being playable.

Character	Original							Country					Land			Racing		3D		Bongo				Mario vs.							DK		
Character	DK	Jr.	II	3	JM	H	C	DKC	2	3	R	TF	DKL	2	III	DKR	BB	64	B	K	K2	K3	JB	MvDK	2	MMA	MLM	MotM	TS	AC	KoS	JC	
Character	OG DK /Cranky	NPC	NPC	NPC	Yes (Note: Non-player character in original version)		Yes	Yes	Yes	NPC	Yes	NPC	Yes	NPC	NPC	NPC		Yes	NPC	NPC	NPC												NPC
Mario	Yes	NPC	NPC			Yes	NPC		NPC									Yes						Yes	Toy	Toy	Toy	Toy	Toy	Toy			
Pauline	NPC																	NPC	Yes						NPC	NPC	Toy	Toy	Toy				
DK Jr.	NPC (Note: Absent in original version)	Yes	Yes		Yes																												
Stanley				Yes																													
DK (modern)								Yes	NPC	NPC	Yes	Yes	Yes	NPC			Yes	Yes	Yes	Yes	Yes	Yes	Yes	NPC	Toy	Toy	Toy	Toy	Toy	Toy	Yes	Yes	
Diddy								Yes	Yes	NPC	Yes	Yes	Yes	Yes		Yes	Yes	Yes	NPC	Yes	Yes	Yes								Toy	Yes	Yes	
Kritter								NPC					NPC					NPC	NPC												Yes		
Rambi								Yes	Yes		NPC	NPC	NPC	Yes				Yes	NPC	NPC		NPC											
Enguarde								Yes	Yes	Yes		NPC		Yes	Yes			Yes	NPC (Note: Cameos as a collectible fossil)		NPC												
Winky								Yes	NPC										NPC			NPC											
Expresso								Yes	NPC				NPC																				
Squawks								NPC	Yes	Yes	NPC	NPC		Yes	Yes	NPC	NPC	NPC	NPC		NPC												
Funky								NPC	NPC	NPC		Yes	NPC	NPC	NPC		Yes	NPC													Yes	Yes	
Krusha								NPC					NPC					Yes															
K. Rool								NPC	NPC	NPC			NPC	NPC	NPC		Yes	NPC	NPC	NPC											Yes	NPC	
Dixie									Yes	Yes	Yes	Yes		Yes	Yes	Yes	Yes		NPC		Yes	Yes									Yes	Yes	
Wrinkly									NPC	NPC				NPC	NPC		Yes	NPC													Yes	NPC	
Rattly									Yes					Yes																			
Squitter									Yes	Yes				Yes	Yes				NPC														
Kiddy										Yes					Yes																		
Ellie										Yes					Yes					NPC													
Pipsy																Yes																	
Timber																Yes																	
Bumper																Yes																	
Conker																Yes (Note: Present only in original version)																	
Tiptup																Yes																	
Drumstick																Yes																	
Banjo																Yes																	
Krunch																Yes																	
Taj																Yes																	
Wizpig																Yes																	
Lanky										NPC							Yes	Yes	NPC (Note: Present as a collectible statue)														
Tiny										NPC						Yes	Yes	Yes															
Chunky										NPC								Yes	NPC														
Jetman																		Yes															
Bubbles																															Yes		

== See also ==
- List of Mario characters
- List of Super Smash Bros. characters
