= Donkey Kong Land III =

1997 video game

- North American box art
- Developer: Rare
- Publisher: Nintendo
- Designers: Gary Richards; Huw Ward
- Writer: Leigh Loveday
- Composer: Eveline Fischer
- Series: Donkey Kong
- Platforms: Game Boy; Game Boy Color
- Release: Game Boy: NA: 27 October 1997; EU: 30 October 1997; Game Boy Color: JP: 28 January 2000
- Genre: Platform
- Mode: Single-player

Donkey Kong Land III is a 1997 platform game developed by Rare and published by Nintendo for the Game Boy. A port for the Game Boy Color was released only in Japan in 2000 under the name Donkey Kong GB: Dinky Kong & Dixie Kong. (Note: Donkey Kong GB: Dinky Kong & Dixie Kong (ドンキーコングGB ディンキーコング&ディクシーコング, Donkī Kongu Jī Bī: Dinkī Kongu & Dikushī Kongu)) Like its predecessors, Donkey Kong Land III served as the portable version of and follow-up to its SNES counterpart, in this case Donkey Kong Country 3: Dixie Kong's Double Trouble!, was enhanced for the Super Game Boy, and was packaged with a "banana yellow" cartridge.

The game has since been re-released via the Nintendo 3DS' Virtual Console in 2014. The game was also later added to the Nintendo Classics service in early December 2024, following the re-releases of its two predecessors from late November.

== Gameplay ==
While the level environments and themes are the same as Donkey Kong Country 3, the level designs are all unique.

== Plot ==
A contest has begun with big prizes for the first person who discovers the Lost World. Donkey Kong and Diddy Kong have already left to find it, leaving a disgruntled Dixie Kong behind. Deciding to prove herself every bit as capable as them, Dixie partners up with her toddler cousin Kiddy Kong. Baron K. Roolenstein and the Kremling Krew are also searching high and low for the fabled land.

== Development ==
Donkey Kong Land 3 was coded by Ian Manders. Manders started at Rare in 1994 with his first project being Ken Griffey Jr.'s Winning Run. The game used the same engine that Robert Harrison wrote from the ground up for Donkey Kong Land 2. Manders said that programming the game was a challenge as he was new to the tighter constraints for which the CPU of the Game Boy allowed.

The game deviates more from its console counterpart Donkey Kong Country 3, if not more than the first game which had new enemies in addition to new scenery and level design. Harrison stated that this was because most of the attention was being made for games for the Nintendo 64 at Rare and that using an existing game engine allowed for more original elements to be made for the game.

On 28 January 2000, less than three years after the game's North American and European releases, Nintendo released an updated Game Boy Color version of the game in Japan. Titled Donkey Kong GB: Dinky Kong & Dixie Kong, it was not released outside of Japan. This version is the same as the Game Boy version, but lacks some animations and dialogues. This version was also released on the 3DS Virtual Console in Japan in 2014, and again on the Japanese Nintendo Classics service in December 2024.

== Reception ==
Reception

Aggregate score
Aggregator	Score
GameRankings	81.25%

Review scores
Publication	Score
Hyper	82/100
Nintendo Power	7.1/10
Nintendojo	8.5/10
Nintendo Life	9/10

Donkey Kong Land III received a score of 81.25% at GameRankings based on four reviews.

Nintendojo and Nintendo Power praised the games sprites with the former citing fluid animation and both complimenting that the character sprites stood out on the screen. Nintendo Power's reviewers found that the Game Boy screen became too blurry during scrolling stages. Nintendo Power recommend players to play the game via the Super Game Boy to alleviate these issues. Both reviews complimented the abundance of content in the game. Hyper praised the visuals and game control while saying it lacked challenging gameplay. The reviewer found the game did not offer a lot of surprises, while stating that "no one ever expected it to."

Nintendo Power and Nintendo Life described the game as the best of the Donkey Kong game for the Game Boy to date and the best of the Donkey Kong Land series respectively.
