= Donkey Konga =

Donkey Kong spin-off video game series

Donkey Konga; Donkey Konga 2; Donkey Konga 3
- North American cover art for Donkey Konga (left) and Donkey Konga 2 (center), and Japanese cover art for Donkey Konga 3 (right)
- Developer: Namco
- Publisher: Nintendo
- Director: Hiroyuki Onoda
- Producer: Hiroshi Igarashi
- Designer: Hiromi Endo
- Artists: Naruhisa Kawano; Toki Iida
- Composers: Junko Ozawa; Jesahm
- Series: Donkey Kong
- Platform: GameCube
- Release: Donkey Konga; JP: December 12, 2003; NA: September 27, 2004; EU: October 15, 2004; AU: October 28, 2004; Donkey Konga 2; JP: July 1, 2004; NA: May 9, 2005; EU: June 3, 2005; Donkey Konga 3; JP: March 17, 2005
- Genre: Rhythm
- Modes: Single-player, multiplayer

Donkey Konga (Note: Japanese: ドンキーコンガ, Hepburn: Donkī Konga) is a series of rhythm video games developed by Namco and published by Nintendo for the GameCube. A spin-off of the Donkey Kong series, they are played with a special controller called the DK Bongos that resemble two small bongo drums, but can optionally be played with the standard GameCube controllers.

Donkey Konga was developed by the team that were responsible for developing the Taiko no Tatsujin series. The tracks include songs such as "Louie Louie", "We Will Rock You", "Shining Star", "Rock Lobster", "Losing My Religion", and Hungarian Dance #5 in G Minor. There are tracks from the Mario series, The Legend of Zelda series, and other Nintendo related music. The Japanese, North American, and PAL region versions have different track lists, and in the North American version of the first two games, almost all of the licensed non-Nintendo/traditional songs are shortened covers. The first two games have around 30 tracks each, depending on the region, while Donkey Konga 3 has 58.

== Plot ==
The player hits notes as they pass through the middle of the screen.

Donkey Kong and Diddy Kong are sitting on a beach one day when they come across some mysterious objects that resemble barrels. Fearing they had something to do with King K. Rool, they take them to Cranky Kong. Cranky explains that they are bongos, so Donkey tries playing them, as does Diddy. Then, when Donkey claps, the bongos start glowing. Cranky explains that the bongos have some kind of power inside them. Donkey and Diddy continue to play the bongos, but they both play terribly. Cranky advises them to practice. At first they are against this, but then they realize if they can become successful in playing the bongos, they could afford as many bananas as they wish, so they start practicing.

== Sequels ==
=== Donkey Konga 2 ===
Donkey Konga 2, (Note: ドンキーコンガ2, Donkī Konga Tsū) marketed in Japan as "Donkey Konga 2: Hit Song Parade!", is the 2004 sequel to Donkey Konga for the Nintendo GameCube, a video game where the player must pound on a special, barrel-like controller called the DK Bongos along with a selected song.

The main selling point of Donkey Konga 2 is over 30 new tracks to play with Bongos. Other features include slightly improved graphics, the inclusion of some classic Donkey Kong characters and a variety of new minigames.

This is the only Donkey Kong game to be rated T for Teen in North America, as it contained lyrics not suitable for younger players. Other regions featured lyrics more appropriate for younger players and thus received lighter ratings.

=== Donkey Konga 3 ===
Donkey Konga 3 (Note: ドンキーコンガ3 食べ放題!春もぎたて50曲♪, Donkī Konga Surī: Tabe-houdai! Haru Mogitate 50 Kyoku; lit. Donkey Konga 3: All You Can Eat! Spring 50 Music Works Mix) is a music video game in the Donkey Kong series developed by Namco and published by Nintendo. Before the second installment was released in North America, Nintendo and Namco had already started plans for the third game in the series, which, unlike the first two Donkey Konga games, was eventually released only in Japan on March 17, 2005.

Donkey Konga 3 features a total of 57 tracks (none repeated from the previous games), over 20 tracks more than the first two games. 35 of these tunes are the usual classical, pop, and game selections, but an extra 21 tunes from Famicom games are included. It also features all new minigames.

== Reception ==
=== Donkey Konga ===
Donkey Konga

Aggregate score
Aggregator	Score
Metacritic	76/100

Review scores
Publication	Score
Edge	7/10
Electronic Gaming Monthly	7.5/10
Eurogamer	6/10
Famitsu	31/40
Game Informer	7/10
GamePro	3/5
GameRevolution	B
GameSpot	7.5/10
GameSpy	4/5
IGN	8.5/10
Nintendo Life	8/10
Nintendo Power	4.2/5
Maxim	8/10
The Sydney Morning Herald	4/5

Donkey Konga received "generally favorable reviews" according to the review aggregation website Metacritic.

Maxim gave the game a score of eight out of ten and said that four bongos should be added "to create a frenzied, unholy din suitable for ritual virgin sacrifice". The Sydney Morning Herald gave it four stars out of five and wrote: "The beginner's level is a breeze, but Konga later becomes deliciously challenging, with hilarity-inducing flustered panic as you start to fall behind and surprising levels of concentration required to clap instead of drum. Hysteria soon prevails". The New York Times, however, gave it a mixed review and said: "Before you buy Konga, try clapping along with every song on the radio for half an hour and see how you feel at the end".

Donkey Konga won an award at the Game Developers Conference for the best "Innovation" in 2005. During the 8th Annual Interactive Achievement Awards, the Academy of Interactive Arts & Sciences awarded Donkey Konga for "Console Family Game of the Year", as well as received nominations for "Outstanding Innovation in Console Gaming", "Outstanding Achievement in Soundtrack", and "Outstanding Achievement in Gameplay Engineering".

=== Donkey Konga 2 ===
Donkey Konga 2

Aggregate score
Aggregator	Score
Metacritic	69/100

Review scores
Publication	Score
Eurogamer	5/10
Game Informer	7/10
GameSpot	6.9/10
GameSpy	3.5/5
GameTrailers	8/10
GameZone	7.8/10
IGN	8/10
Nintendo Power	3.9/5
Detroit Free Press	2/4

Donkey Konga 2 received "average" reviews according to Metacritic.
