= Donkey Kong Jr. Math =

1983 video game

- North American box art featuring Donkey Kong next to a subtraction exercise
- Developer: Nintendo R&D2
- Publisher: Nintendo
- Designer: Toshihiko Nakago
- Composer: Yukio Kaneoka
- Series: Donkey Kong
- Platform: Nintendo Entertainment System
- Release: JP: December 12, 1983; NA: October 18, 1985; PAL: 1986
- Genres: Edutainment, platform
- Modes: Single-player, multiplayer

Donkey Kong Jr. Math (Note: Japanese: ドンキーコングJR.の算数遊び, Hepburn: Donkī Kongu Junia no Sansū Asobi) is a 1983 edutainment platform video game developed and published by Nintendo for the Nintendo Entertainment System. It is a spin-off of the 1982 arcade game Donkey Kong Jr. In the game, players control Donkey Kong Jr. as he solves math problems set up by his father Donkey Kong.

It is the only game in the Education Series of NES games in North America, owing to the game's lack of success. It was made available in various forms, including in the 2002 GameCube video game Animal Crossing and on the Virtual Console services for Wii and Wii U in 2007 and 2014 respectively, and in 2024 for the Nintendo Classics service. Donkey Kong Jr. Math was a critical and commercial failure. It has received criticism from several publications including IGN staff, who called it one of the worst Virtual Console games.

Bruce Lowry, Nintendo of America’s vice president of sales from 1981 to 1986, referred to it as “the worst game we ever sold.”

== Gameplay ==
Two players compete by creating arithmetic equations to reach the number held by Donkey Kong (top center). Player 1 (middle left) climbs vines to acquire numbers. Player 2 (bottom right) stands on its starting platform.

The game features two modes, one single-player and the other allowing for one to two players. Its mechanics are similar to its predecessor, Donkey Kong Jr. The Calculate mode has Donkey Kong hold up a number, which players must attempt to reach by collecting a combination of digits and arithmetic symbols to eventually reach that number. Players must climb vines to reach these figures. The +−×÷ Exercise requires players to solve fixed math puzzles by climbing chains to reach the correct numbers and arithmetic symbols to do so.

== Development ==
Donkey Kong Jr. Math was developed by Nintendo Research & Development 2 and designed by Toshihiko Nakago. It was published by Nintendo for the Family Computer (Famicom) and Nintendo Entertainment System (NES). It reuses its engine, assets, and gameplay from Donkey Kong Jr. It was a part of the Educational Series on the NES, a series that was originally supposed to have three entries, including music game Donkey Kong's Music Play (Note: Japanese: ドンキーコングの音楽遊び, Hepburn: Donkī Kongu no Ongaku Asobi) [ja], but was the only one released under that line. A lack of success by the game was attributed by a Nintendo spokesman to be the reason Nintendo did not make more educational titles. It was the first spin-off title Nintendo made.

The game was first released in Japan on December 12, 1983, and was released shortly after together with Donkey Kong Jr. as a licensed multicart (released in a bundle together with Sharp's C1 Famicom TV). In August 1995, the Sharp multicart was re-released separately from the C1 Famicom TV. The game has been released on other platforms, including the video game Animal Crossing, which featured several NES games. Donkey Kong Jr. Math was re-released on the Wii's Virtual Console in Japan on March 27, 2007, Europe and Australia on April 20, and in North America on September 3. It was re-released again for the Wii U's Virtual Console in North America on August 28, 2014, in Europe on January 22, 2015, and in Japan on April 15.

== Reception ==
Reception

Aggregate score
Aggregator	Score
GameRankings	32%

Review scores
Publication	Score
AllGame	3/5
Eurogamer	3/10
GameSpot	3/10
IGN	3/10
Nintendo Life	1/10

Donkey Kong Jr. Math was met with negative reviews from the press. Despite this negative reception, the magazine Joystick felt Nintendo was worthy of praise for its attempt at making an educational game. The game was also a commercial failure, with a Nintendo spokesperson noting its lack of success as being due to poor reception. Donkey Kong Jr. Math performed better in Japan but was forgotten in the United States. Its poor sales contributed to it becoming a rare and expensive collector's item.

Jeremy Parish of Polygon called it the worst Donkey Kong video game, suggesting that it was a "half-finished game" to have a larger launch lineup on the Famicom. He was also critical of the reuse of assets from Donkey Kong Jr., while Skyler Miller of AllGame found this reuse creative. Bob Mackey of 1UP.com called Donkey Kong Jr. Math the worst NES launch window title, criticizing it for its lack of value and sluggish movement. The game had a poor reception from IGN, with Lucas M. Thomas finding its controls and execution poor, while Cam Shea regarded it as one of the worst Virtual Console games and criticized it for a lack of value. Dan Whitehead of Eurogamer similarly could not justify the asking price for the Virtual Console version. Frank Provo of GameSpot felt that its math problems were either too easy for young children or too boring for older ones. Damien McFarren of Nintendo Life criticized the game for "shoehorning" education into this game and for poor controls. Author Jeff Ryan referred to the game as a "dud". While noting that it "reinforced math fundamentals", he called the gameplay "fun" but "challenging".

Donkey Kong Jr. Math has received criticism for its qualities as an educational game. Elizabeth Sweedyk, associate computer science professor at Harvey Mudd College, felt that Donkey Kong Jr. Math was too realistic an educational game to be fun. Kevin Gifford of 1UP.com felt that it lacks appeal for children, while Frank Caron for Ars Technica felt it inferior to other educational games like Brain Age and Math Blaster.
