= Donkey Kong: Jungle Climber =

2007 video game

DK: Jungle Climber
- North American box art
- Developer: Paon
- Publisher: Nintendo
- Directors: Atsushi Kaneko; Masataka Sato
- Producers: Toshiharu Izuno; Rikiya Nakagawa; Iwao Horita
- Programmer: Kenichi Minegishi
- Artists: Hiroaki Endo; Kazuto Sato; Youichi Magome; Ryuji Ishizaki; Wataru Nanaumi; Rika Hirono; Hiromi Ito
- Composers: Yuichi Kanno; Yoshitaka Hirota; Takashi Kouga
- Series: Donkey Kong
- Platform: Nintendo DS
- Release: JP: August 9, 2007; NA: September 10, 2007; EU: October 12, 2007; AU: November 1, 2007
- Genre: Puzzle-platformer
- Modes: Single-player, multiplayer

Donkey Kong: Jungle Climber, (Note: Japanese: ドンキーコング ジャングルクライマー, Hepburn: Donkī Kongu Janguru Kuraimā) also stylised as DK: Jungle Climber, is a 2007 puzzle-platform game developed by Paon and published by Nintendo for the Nintendo DS, a handheld video game console. It was released in Japan on August 9, 2007, and in western territories later that year. It was re-released for the Wii U's Virtual Console in Japan and North America in July 2015 and in Europe and Australia in August.

DK: Jungle Climber is a sequel to DK: King of Swing (2005) for the Game Boy Advance, featuring similar gameplay, but the visuals have been designed to more closely resemble Donkey Kong Country and add dual screen support.

== Gameplay ==
Like DK: King of Swing, DK: Jungle Climber features Donkey Kong and Diddy Kong as the main characters. To navigate the levels, the player must hold down L and R to jump, and alternating between L and R allows Donkey Kong to hold onto or let go of the pegs on the levels. When Donkey Kong is only holding onto one peg, he will spin, allowing him to climb up the pegs. The game features new moves, new items, and minigames. It uses the dual screens to give the illusion of one tall screen. The game features a multiplayer mode for up to four players.

== Plot ==
Donkey Kong and his friends decided to take a well-earned vacation on beautiful Sun Sun Beach, located, of course, on tropical Sun Sun Island. After enjoying a splash in the ocean, a hungry DK and his friends saw a massive banana floating atop a mountain. Without a moment's hesitation, DK up and raced for the mountaintop. When DK, Cranky Kong, and Diddy Kong reached the top, they encountered Xananab, an alien that looked like a banana. But they also saw King K. Rool and his four Kremling advisors making off with the five Crystal Bananas, five objects Xananab wanted back. DK agreed to help Xananab get the Crystal Banana back, thus starting off his next adventure, with Diddy at his side.

Donkey and Diddy (along with Cranky and Xananab) travel through several islands, including Ghost Island, Lost Island, and Chill 'n' Char Island. At the end of the last level of each island DK had to fight a Kremling mutated by one of the Crystal Bananas, and going into a big machine. After beating the boss, they gained a Crystal Banana. At the end of Chill 'n' Char Island, after the boss, K. Rool and his final Kremling make way to the King Kruizer IV, an updated model of K. Rool's cruiser seen in Donkey Kong Country 2: Diddy's Kong Quest (and its portable conversion entitled Donkey Kong Land 2), Donkey Kong 64, and DK: King of Swing. They travel to the top of a very large island, High-High Island, to make it just a little too late. Cranky gives them a Booster Barrel (also seen in King of Swing), which they use to travel into the King Kruizer IV. Once inside, they travel through the vehicle, and DK has to fight the final Kremling, gaining a Crystal Banana once victorious.

K. Rool flees with his last device, going into a wormhole, which eventually leads DK and friends into Xananab's home planet, Planet Plataen. K. Rool is fought here, and, once defeated, uses the final Crystal Banana to mutate and become gigantic. Once DK defeats K. Rool in this state, K. Rool is defeated and the game ends. Xananab thanks DK, Diddy, and Cranky by making them the local celebrities and they are able to eat all the bananas they want. Eventually, the three monkeys head home, and humorously tie K. Rool to the back of the Banana Spaceship.

== Reception ==
Reception

Aggregate scores
Aggregator	Score
GameRankings	76.75%
Metacritic	77/100

Review scores
Publication	Score
1Up.com	7/10
Eurogamer	8/10
Game Informer	5.75/10
GameSpot	7.5/10
GameSpy	4/5
IGN	8/10
M! Games	76/100
Nintendo Life	8/10
Nintendo Power	8/10
Nintendo World Report	8/10
Official Nintendo Magazine	82%

The game received mostly positive reviews and was considered an improvement over DK: King of Swing, garnering an aggregate score of 76.75% on GameRankings based on 34 reviews. The game was praised for its fun, practical controls and its vibrant visuals. Nintendo Life gave the game a score of 8 out of 10. IGN noted that the "visual look of the game is far superior" to King of Swing, also awarding it an 8 out of 10.
