= DK King of Swing =

2005 puzzle-platform video game

DK: King of Swing
- North American box art
- Developer: Paon
- Publisher: Nintendo
- Directors: Atsushi Kaneko; Masataka Sato
- Producers: Toshiharu Izuno; Tatsuya Watanabe; Iwao Horita
- Designer: Yuzuru Tsukahara
- Programmer: Kenichi Minegishi
- Artists: Hiroaki Endo; Kazuto Sato; Youichi Magome; Wataru Nanaumi; Rika Hirono; Hiromi Ito
- Composer: Takashi Kouga
- Series: Donkey Kong
- Platform: Game Boy Advance
- Release: EU: February 4, 2005; AU: March 16, 2005; JP: May 19, 2005; NA: September 19, 2005
- Genre: Puzzle-platform
- Modes: Single-player, multiplayer

DK: King of Swing (Note: Known in Japan as Swinging Donkey (Japanese: ぶらぶらドンキー, Hepburn: Burabura Donkī).) is a 2005 puzzle-platform game developed by Paon and published by Nintendo for the Game Boy Advance. King of Swing diverges from the gameplay of other games in the Donkey Kong series, instead featuring characters rotating around pegs and using their spinning momentum to progress. King of Swing has a single-player adventure mode, as well as a competitive multiplayer mode for up to four players. The game received mixed reception.

DK: King of Swing was re-released for the Wii U's Virtual Console in Japan and North America in November 2014 and in Europe and Australia in January 2015. A sequel, DK: Jungle Climber, was released for the Nintendo DS in 2007.

== Gameplay ==
Donkey Kong swings on a blue peg as a Flitter enemy flies by on the "Tropical Treetops" stage.

The gameplay in DK: King of Swing is loosely inspired by that of the NES game Clu Clu Land (1984). Is is primarily based around the use of the L and R triggers, which control the player character's left and right hands respectively. By holding the trigger, the character's fist will clamp shut, grasping anything in its range. Pegs and pegboards are positioned throughout the environment for characters to grasp, allowing the player to climb and traverse their surroundings. Grasping a peg with the character's right or left hand will respectively cause them to rotate clockwise or counterclockwise around it, and the player must use their spinning momentum to propel them through the air. Both the triggers and the D-pad can be used to affect horizontal character movement while airborne or on the ground. Pressing both triggers simultaneously while grounded will cause the character to jump, while holding the triggers at any time will cause them to store up power, after which they will perform a charge attack when the triggers are released. This can be used to attack enemies and obstacles or cross short gaps. Players can also perform other tasks with their character's hands in combination with their spinning momentum, such as turning cranks, pulling levers, and throwing rocks at distant enemies.

In the game's single-player Adventure mode, King K. Rool steals the prize medals from the upcoming Jungle Jam tournament, prompting Donkey Kong to chase after him and retrieve the stolen medals. Players control Donkey Kong as he travels across five worlds, each made up of four stages and a boss battle. Scattered across each stage are bananas for Donkey Kong to collect, which the player can spend at any time during gameplay to recover Donkey Kong's health or grant him temporary invincibility. Players can find one of 20 Crystal Coconuts hidden in each stage, which are used to unlock an additional character. A stolen medal can also be found in nearly every stage, as well as earned from defeating each boss. Completing Adventure will unlock a time attack mode, while collecting all 24 medals will unlock "Diddy Mode", a more difficult version of Adventure where the player controls Diddy Kong.

In Jungle Jam mode, the player can participate in four-player competitive events against computer-controlled opponents or up to three other players via the use of a Game Link Cable. There are five types of Jungle Jam events: two based around racing, two based around battling, and one based around capturing territory on a board. Players are awarded bronze, silver, or gold medals for defeating CPU opponents in single-player events, with additional events unlocked as the player earns medals in Adventure. Donkey Kong, Diddy Kong, Dixie Kong and Funky Kong all appear as playable characters in Jungle Jam by default; by obtaining collectibles in Adventure and gold medals in Jungle Jam, players can also unlock Wrinkly Kong, Kremling, King K. Rool, and Clu Clu Land protagonist Bubbles.

== Reception ==
Reception

Aggregate scores
Aggregator	Score
GameRankings	71.85%
Metacritic	70/100

Review scores
Publication	Score
1Up.com	B
Eurogamer	7/10
Game Informer	7.75/10
GameSpot	7.3/10
GameSpy	4/5
IGN	7.8/10
Nintendo Power	8/10
Nintendo World Report	9.5/10

DK: King of Swing received mixed reception, garnering an aggregate score of 70% on Metacritic based on 30 reviews.

Craig Harris of IGN criticized the cartoon-style graphics as being a step back from the pre-rendered 3D graphics featured in the Donkey Kong Country series, but considered it a unique experience despite its simplistic mechanics. In contrast, Phil Theobold of GameSpy thought the art style was much more appealing than that of past Donkey Kong games. While Jeremy Parish of 1Up.com considered the gameplay novel, he felt it became repetitive quickly and wished there was additional depth to the mechanics. Kristian Reed of Eurogamer the Adventure mode, but considered Jungle Jam to be surperfluous and dull. Matt Helgeson of Game Informer found the gameplay addicting, stating the only significant downsides were its difficulty curve and some of the level design. Frank Provo expected King of Swing would draw mixed reactions from players, noting that there was "nothing overtly broken with the game, but you may love or hate certain aspects of it depending on your personal proclivities." Ben Kosmina of Nintendo World Report called King of Swing a must-play, feeling that the strength of the game mechanics were strong enough that the game would still be great even if it used a less desirable intellectual property than Donkey Kong.

== Legacy ==
A sequel to DK: King of Swing, titled DK: Jungle Climber, was released in 2007 for the Nintendo DS. It received favorable reviews and was generally considered an improvement over King of Swing.
