= Mario Super Sluggers =

2008 video game

- North American box art
- Developer: Namco Bandai Games
- Publisher: Nintendo
- Director: Hideki Tomida
- Producers: Yasushi Ono; Toyokazu Nonaka
- Artist: Masahiro Hoshino
- Composers: Ayako Yamaguchi; Masashi Sugiyama; Nobuhiro Ohuchi; Kazuyuki Fujita
- Series: Mario Baseball
- Platform: Wii
- Release: JP: June 19, 2008; NA: August 25, 2008
- Genres: Sports (Baseball), adventure
- Modes: Single-player, multiplayer

Mario Super Sluggers (Note: Known in Japan as Super Mario Stadium Family Baseball (Japanese: スーパーマリオスタジアム ファミリーベースボール, Hepburn: Sūpā Mario Sutajiamu Famirī Bēsubōru)) is a 2008 sports video game developed by Bandai Namco and published by Nintendo for the Wii. It is part of the Mario Sports series, and the sequel to Mario Superstar Baseball for the GameCube. The game was released in Japan on June 19, 2008 and North America on August 25, 2008.

Like its predecessor, Mario Super Sluggers gameplay sees the player using various Mario series characters of their choosing to compete in games of baseball. Alongside traditional play, the game features an adventure mode where players must recruit members of a baseball team in order to defeat Bowser Jr. and Bowser.

The game received mixed reviews, with praise for the large character roster, multiplayer and gameplay, but criticism for the controls and lack of online play, while the graphics received mixed reactions.

== Game modes ==
Mario Super Sluggers features game modes that are similar to those of Mario Superstar Baseball.

=== Exhibition ===
The player can choose a captain and which eight players to have on a team. The number of innings can be chosen, and which field position the players are on. The player can choose which one of the nine stadiums to play on, as long as it is unlocked.

=== Challenge Mode ===
The player starts as Mario and must recruit all the characters. This is also where to unlock all characters and stadiums. The plot of this mode is that Bowser Jr. is taking over the ball parks. After defeating Bowser Jr., Bowser appears and the player must defeat him in his Castle.

The player can choose between five different captains: Mario (Mario Stadium) and the unlockable captains Yoshi (Yoshi Park), Donkey Kong (DK Jungle), Wario (Wario City), and Princess Peach (Peach Ice Garden). The player may switch captains at any time during gameplay.

=== Minigames ===
Some minigames can only be played in day or night time. There are nine minigames in total. However, several of the minigames are unlockable. Some minigames only play with the Wii Remote with Nunchuk and the Wii Remote sideways.

=== Toy Field ===
Players try to hit baseballs to point spaces all around the field. The other players try to catch the ball. A player who catches a ball goes up to bat. At the end of the game, king medals are awarded for various achievements. The computer adds up the score and the player with the most points will win. Toy Field can be played with the Wii Remote with Nunchuk, or with the Wii Remote sideways.

=== Practice ===
Players learn to bat, pitch, fielding, special moves and base running, so they can be better.

=== Records ===
Shows MVPs of exhibition games, star players in challenge mode and high scores of the minigames. There are also videos, and when the game is completed, the records will show the Intro movie.

== Gameplay ==
A pre-release screenshot of Yoshi up at bat against Bowser Jr.

The gameplay of Mario Super Sluggers is similar to that of its predecessor; the main difference being the controls, with the Wii Remote adding immersion using a control scheme similar to the baseball sub-game in Wii Sports. There are three control methods available: Wii Remote by itself, Wii Remote and Nunchuk, and the Wii Remote held sideways. Along with different styles of game mechanics, an important feature in Mario Super Sluggers is chemistry between the nine characters on a team. Chemistry gives any team the opportunity to earn items, rob home-runs with a super jump and use a laser beam throw to catch any opponent in the base path. This advantage in chemistry will help any team increase their odds of winning and increase their understanding of the game.

== Promotion ==
As part of the North American marketing launch, Nintendo created a series of collectible online cards along with a website that served as a virtual collector's album. The site promises that the series will include a card for each of the 41 characters featured in Mario Super Sluggers.

The cards began appearing in banner ads on popular children websites on August 18, 2008, but have since begun to appear as embedded hyperlinks in other, less obvious locations. Mario Super Sluggers cards have been found on other sites, such as YouTube.

When the Seattle Mariners played the New York Yankees on September 5, 2008, the game was promoted there at Safeco Field. The first 20,000 fans received special Mario Super Sluggers foam mitts. There were also two booths with the game demo, and Mario Super Sluggers cards were also passed out there. Every inning, someone was randomly chosen to win a Wii system along with the game. Whenever a home run or a good play happened, the Safeco Field video screen showed a gameplay clip with Mario, Luigi, or Bowser. A Mario mascot also appeared before the game with the Mariners' mascot, the Moose, but left after the first inning. Nintendo of America's offices are based in the Seattle area, and was the majority owner of the Mariners at the time of the game's release (hence the promotion).

== Reception ==
Reviews

Aggregate scores
Aggregator	Score
GameRankings	69.72%
Metacritic	69/100

Review scores
Publication	Score
Destructoid	7/10
Game Informer	5.5/10
GamePro	3/5
GameRevolution	B−
GameSpot	6.5/10
GameSpy	4/5
GameTrailers	6.7/10
GameZone	7.3/10
Giant Bomb	2/5
IGN	7.4/10
Nintendo Power	7.5/10

Mario Super Sluggers received mixed reviews. The lack of online play was a generally major factor in the reviews. On GameRankings, the game holds a score of 69.72%, and on Metacritic a 69 out of 100.

The game was nominated for the 2009 Nickelodeon Kids' Choice Awards for Favorite Video Game, in which it lost to Guitar Hero World Tour.

=== Sales ===
By the end of 2019, the game had sold 2.32 million units worldwide.
