= Diddy Kong =

Donkey Kong character

- Donkey Kong and Mario character
- Super Nintendo World art by Shigehisa Nakaue (2024)
- First game: Donkey Kong Country (1994)
- Created by: Gregg Mayles
- Designed by: Kevin Bayliss
- Voiced by: Mark Betteridge (1994–1996); Andrew Sabiston (Donkey Kong Country TV series); Chris Sutherland (1997–2005); Katsumi Suzuki (2004–present)

In-universe information
- Species: Kong (monkey based)
- Family: Kong family

Diddy Kong (Japanese: ディディーコング, Hepburn: Didī Kongu) is a character created by the British game developers Gregg Mayles and Kevin Bayliss. He is a major character in Nintendo's Donkey Kong franchise and also appears in the Mario franchise. Diddy is a nimble monkey and a member of the Kong family. He is Donkey Kong's nephew and usually appears as his sidekick. He wears a red shirt that has a star pattern, and a red hat that used to have the Nintendo logo on it, but now has a red pin with the yellow initials "DD" on it.

Diddy debuted as one of the two protagonists of Rare's Donkey Kong Country, a 1994 platform game, alongside Donkey Kong, and later starred in Donkey Kong Country 2 as its protagonist with the character Dixie Kong. He has appeared in most Donkey Kong games since his introduction, as well as Donkey Kong 64 and Diddy Kong Racing. He continued to appear in Donkey Kong games after Microsoft acquired Rare in 2002, and also appears in Mario games such as the Mario Golf and Mario Kart series. He also appears as a playable character in the Super Smash Bros. series.

His design was conceived as a redesign of the character Donkey Kong Jr., but Nintendo did not like the idea, so they used the design for a new character instead. The design was made with the idea of creating a smaller, more agile character than Donkey Kong, and he went through multiple names before they landed on Diddy.

== Appearances ==
Diddy Kong's first appearance was in Donkey Kong Country in 1994 as a sidekick to protagonist Donkey Kong, accompanying him to defeat the antagonist King K. Rool, who has stolen Donkey Kong's banana hoard. He became the main character in the sequel Donkey Kong Country 2: Diddy's Kong Quest, teaming up with Dixie Kong, who both set to rescue Donkey Kong from K. Rool. In both of these, players could choose to play as either Diddy or the other character, allowing players to swap back and forth between Diddy Kong. In Donkey Kong Country 3: Dixie Kong's Double Trouble!, Diddy goes missing, which leads Dixie to search for him and Donkey Kong. He appears in Donkey Kong 64 as a playable character, having been kidnapped by K. Rool, who intends to destroy DK Island with a giant laser. Diddy is featured as a playable character in both Donkey Kong Country Returns and Donkey Kong Country: Tropical Freeze, serving as a partner to Donkey Kong in each. The Returns development team, Retro Studios, opted to make Diddy Kong a combined character with Donkey Kong as opposed to allowing the player to swap between them. In Donkey Kong Bananza, Diddy Kong appears alongside Dixie Kong, where they challenge Donkey Kong to a race on Rambis, in the game's "Racing Layer".

Diddy stars in the spin-off racing game Diddy Kong Racing for the Nintendo 64. While the game initially featured only original characters, Nintendo suggested making an existing Nintendo character the star of the game to increase market appeal; Rare chose Diddy in recognition of the fact that he was their creation. Diddy Kong appears in multiple other games, including DK: King of Swing, its sequel DK: Jungle Climber, and the Donkey Konga series. Outside of the Donkey Kong series, Diddy has appeared in multiple games in the Mario franchise, including the Mario Golf series, Mario Tennis series, and the Mario Kart series. He first appeared in Mario Kart: Double Dash!!, where he beat out Donkey Kong Jr. for inclusion due to being more recognizable. He was later featured in other Mario Kart games, including Mario Kart Wii, Mario Kart Tour, and Mario Kart 8 Deluxe's Booster Course Pass. In the Super Smash Bros. series, Diddy Kong was featured as a playable character starting with Super Smash Bros. Brawl, appearing in all subsequent entries.

Diddy Kong appeared as part of the main cast in the Donkey Kong Country animated series, voiced by Andrew Sabiston, where his role as Donkey Kong's sidekick remained relatively the same as in the games. Along with several other members of the Kong family, Diddy has a cameo in The Super Mario Bros. Movie, initially voiced by Eric Bauza, where he is seen as a crowd member during Mario's fight with Donkey Kong. Diddy Kong is featured as part of a ride at Universal Studios and Nintendo's Super Nintendo World theme park called Mine-Cart Madness. Multiple pieces of merchandise have been designed based on Diddy Kong, including accessories, clothing, an Amiibo figure, and plush toys. He has also been featured in Lego sets.

== Concept and creation ==
Diddy Kong was created by Gregg Mayles and Kevin Bayliss. Diddy Kong came about due to a request by Nintendo to give Donkey Kong a sidekick in Donkey Kong Country. Gregg Mayles stated that Diddy Kong was originally an updated design on the character Donkey Kong Jr. According to Diddy Kong designer Kevin Bayliss, this look came from the development team's desire to make a character dissimilar from Donkey Kong's build and characteristics, wanting a more agile character to accompany Donkey Kong. It was suggested that Diddy Kong be a spider monkey, though Bayliss noted he looked "nothing like one of those." Bayliss stated that Coco Pops mascot Coco the Monkey inspired his design. According to Mayles, Nintendo did not like how different this updated design was from the original Jr. design, and either wanted the original Donkey Kong Jr. included or for this design to become a different character. They opted to use this design, believing it suited the setting of Donkey Kong Country. They also wanted to incorporate Diddy's tail into the gameplay, noting that Donkey Kong Jr. did not have one.

When deciding on a name, they went through multiple ideas, including Diet DK, DK Lite, Titchy Kong, and Dinky Kong. They initially chose Dinky Kong, but changed it to Diddy following legal advice. Mayles explained that they initially chose Dinky because it meant 'small', and that the legal concern was due to a toy car manufacturer making toy cars called "Dinky" cars. The name Diddy was used due to it similarly meaning 'small'. The name "Dinky Kong" would later be used as Kiddy Kong's name in Japanese releases of the series. In 2025, Diddy Kong received a slight redesign, giving him teeth, a rounder belly, and a cap with a DD pin instead of the Nintendo logo. Bayliss expressed his appreciation for the redesign, thankful that it was "sympathetic" towards his design.

== Reception ==
Since appearing in Donkey Kong Country, Diddy Kong has received mostly positive reception. Nick Gillett of The Guardian and David Lozada of GameRevolution both described Diddy Kong as one of the best video game sidekicks. Gillett felt that his design was done for marketing purposes, stating that he was able to succeed as a protagonist in spite of that. Real Sound writer Sheroop felt that Diddy Kong having been designed by Rare resulted in Diddy Kong having few opportunities prior to Rare's sale to Microsoft in 2002, at which point he began appearing in Mario games.

Author Sam Srauy believed that the introduction of Diddy Kong as the star of the second Donkey Kong Country was done to appeal to an aging demographic at the time, Nintendo hoping to give a character who adolescent gamers can identify with, as opposed to the adult Donkey Kong. In contrast to her belief that Kongs originally represented negative stereotypes of black people, she felt Diddy Kong, as well as Dixie Kong, represented "Reagan era whiteness." Srauy argued that Diddy represented the "law abiding hero", and that the vigilantism of hid actions made Diddy an individualist, which she believed was tied to white masculinity. Authors James Newman and Claire Molloy believed that Diddy Kong's use of conga drums and bongos was a stereotypical design choice.

Creative Bloq writer Natalie Fear was mixed on his 2025 redesign; she was not sure whether to find the addition of teeth as an "uncanny or cute" design choice. She felt that the addition of teeth took away from his "endearing cartoony appeal." Polygon writer Michael McWhertor was more positive, believing that Diddy Kong from the Rare-made games looked "weird" by comparison. While both felt that this new design had elements of Diddy Kong from the Donkey Kong Country games and The Super Mario Bros. Movie, McWhertor felt it was more similar to the former than the latter.

Diddy Kong's absence from Mario Kart World caused multiple critics to express disappointment. TheGamer writer George Foster stated that his 2025 redesign made people hope that he would appear, though noted that the lack of Diddy Kong in marketing for the game made his absence unsurprising. Destructoid writer Adam Newell was similarly unsurprised, citing the fact that Diddy Kong was absent from Mario Kart 8 at the start as well. NME writer Echo Apsey found his exclusion strange and surprising, citing his appearance in Mario Kart 8's DLC and him being a main character in the Mario franchise, though acknowledged that he was absent from many Mario Kart games. They speculated that he was either not planned for inclusion, or his inclusion was pushed back to coincide with Bananza or a sequel to The Super Mario Bros. Movie.
