= King K. Rool =

Donkey Kong antagonist

- Donkey Kong character
- In-game artwork from Donkey Kong Bananza (2025)
- First appearance: Donkey Kong Country (1994)
- Created by: Gregg Mayles
- Designed by: Steve Mayles
- Voiced by: Various: Chris Sutherland (1994–1999, 2005); Toshihide Tsuchiya (2007–2008); Tsuguo Mogami (2025–present); Benedict Campbell (animated series)

In-universe information
- Aliases: Kaptain K. Rool; Baron K. Roolenstein; Krusha K. Rool; K. Rool, King of Rot
- Species: Kremling
- Affiliation: Kremling Krew

King K. Rool (Note: Japanese: キングクルール, Hepburn: Kingu Kurūru; King Cruel) is a fictional character and the main antagonist of Nintendo's Donkey Kong franchise. K. Rool is the leader of the Kremling Krew, which consists mainly of Kremlings who are an army of crocodilian pirates, and usually seeks to plunder the gorilla Donkey Kong's stash of bananas in order to satisfy his own love of the fruit when overripe. Created by British game designer Gregg Mayles, K. Rool first appeared in Donkey Kong Country (1994). His name is a pun on the word cruel, a nod to his malevolent nature. K. Rool has additionally appeared as a playable fighter in Super Smash Bros. Ultimate (2018), and in the Donkey Kong Country animated series and merchandise.

== Appearances ==
King K. Rool originally appears in Donkey Kong Country as its main antagonist and final boss, stealing protagonist Donkey Kong's banana hoard with the aid of his minions, the Kremlings. He subsequently appears in Donkey Kong Country 2 (1995) and Donkey Kong Country 3 (1996), assuming the roles of pirate Kaptain K. Rool and mad scientist Baron K. Roolenstein, respectively. In 2, he kidnaps Donkey Kong for a banana hoard ransom, spurring protagonists Diddy Kong and Dixie Kong to save him, and in 3, he kidnaps Donkey Kong and Diddy to power his KAOS robot, requiring Dixie and Kiddy Kong to save them. In Donkey Kong 64 (1999), he pilots a ship armed with a laser to Donkey Kong Island, intent on destroying it once the laser has enough power. He kidnaps Diddy Kong, Tiny Kong, Lanky Kong and Chunky Kong, requiring Donkey Kong to rescue them and join up to defeat him. In the final battle, he assumes a boxer persona dubbed King Krusha K. Rool and is fought in a boxing ring. After making an appearance as the main antagonist and final boss in the Nintendo DS game Donkey Kong Jungle Climber, K. Rool was largely absent from the Donkey Kong series for an extended period of time, outside of minor appearances.

K. Rool returns in Donkey Kong Bananza (2025) as the game's true main antagonist and final boss; it is revealed by him in-game that his absence from the series was the result of him and his fellow Kremlings being trapped underground while searching for the wish-fulfilling Banandium Root. After being unintentionally freed by Donkey Kong and Pauline, K. Rool punches Void Kong, the primary antagonist away and is fought in the Planet Core before he follows his enemies as they escape to New Donk City—an area introduced in Super Mario Odyssey—which he attempts to reshape in his image using the Banandium Root while flooding it with hazardous banana mush. Under the alias of K. Rool, King of Rot, he then fights Donkey Kong once again, but is eventually defeated.

K. Rool has multiple playable appearances outside of the Donkey Kong series, including being a playable character in the 2008 baseball game Mario Super Sluggers. In the Super Smash Bros. series, he makes his first playable appearance in Super Smash Bros. Ultimate (2018), featuring attacks based on his various appearances as a boss character.

King K. Rool appears as a main character in the Donkey Kong Country animated series. In most episodes, K. Rool attempts to steal the Crystal Coconut, an ancient relic that is said to possess extraordinary power. He is portrayed by Canadian theater actor Benedict Campbell.

In 2023, Campbell, alongside many other Donkey Kong Country cast members, reprised his role in the fan-made animation DKC: Return to Krocodile Isle, written and directed by YouTuber Alex Henderson, which tells the story of K. Rool, who went missing for a decade, reuniting with his fellow Kremlings to announce his plans to take over Donkey Kong's island. However, his grand return is revealed to be a figment of his imagination, and he only made himself known to the Kremlings again by burning down the basement of their bar in a fit of madness, while Donkey Kong is shown in a TV interview to have forgotten about his nemesis. Nevertheless, K. Rool receives an invitation to participate in Ultimate. The short features the original song "Tip the Scale".

== Concept and creation ==
In his standard appearance, King K. Rool is depicted as a tall, obese and green-scaled crocodile with a red cape; golden wristbands; a matching belly-like plate and tall and slender crown he can roll across the ground as a weapon; and a single and bulging bloodshot eye. He was designed by Steve Mayles, an artist who worked at Rare and brother of Donkey Kong Country designer Gregg Mayles. Concept art of K. Rool had a more serious design with a military theme and with the name 'Krudd'. When asked what the K in "K. Rool" stands for, Mayles said: "It was just a way of making him seem more important, that he'd added it to inflate his ego", stating that "it could have been something tonal like 'Kremling' or something deliberately out of character, like Keith".

Gregg discussed the design of the K. Rool boss fights in Donkey Kong Country and its sequel, stating that he felt he had more time in the sequel to make the fight complex rather than merely difficult, though he also believed that he was able to make the fight "tricky" regardless. He stated that he received comments about how difficult purple gas clouds that reverse the player's movement were, noting that he included them as an homage to the 1984 video game Sabre Wulf. Gregg also stated that K. Rool's boxing boss fight that required use of all five Kongs in Donkey Kong 64 was designed that way to "ensure it felt like all the Kongs were teaming up to beat their nemesis". It was also made to be a parody of "over the top, glitzy world heavyweight boxing".

== Reception ==
Since his debut in 1994, King K. Rool has received a mostly positive critical reception. New York magazine writer staff believed that K. Rool's appearance in Donkey Kong 64 was among the most difficult in video games, remarking how frustrating it was that the fight was so stacked in favor of K. Rool due to the player being limited and unable to heal like K. Rool could. Author Daryl Baxter considered the boss fight against K. Rool in Donkey Kong Country 2 a memorable one, particularly the first fight against him, stating that it felt like the game had been building up to it since the very first level. He also found the design and graphics of the game, which he identified as being ahead of its time in 1995, improved the battle as well. Writing for Kotaku, Ethan Gash heavily praised K. Rool's return in Bananza, stating that his appearance "turns [Bananza] from a very good game into a great one". Gash praised the numerous callbacks related to him, such as the return of the fake "Kredits" from Donkey Kong Country. Game Rant writer Tristan Jurkovich also praised K. Rool's return, stating that his final segment of the game "reaches Hideo Kojima levels of absurdity in the best possible ways".

Astrid Johnson of Game Revolution observed the affinity people have towards K. Rool, describing him as a "daddy" and comparing his online popularity—particularly in queer spaces—to the unconventional romance depicted in The Shape of Water. Johnson argued that "much like how many villains and antagonists in old movies were queer-coded in an archaic attempt to instill some revulsion in audiences, monsters and creatures are made in the same way."

King K. Rool was a popular suggestion for inclusion in the Super Smash Bros. series as a playable character, including by employees of Playtonic Games, a company formed by ex-Rare employees. His eventual inclusion in Super Smash Bros. was met with fan letters thanking series director Masahiro Sakurai. Daniel Friedman of Polygon discussed his lasting popularity, stating that unofficial polls held about who should be in Super Smash Bros. found that K. Rool was the most popular choice by a significant margin. Sakurai stated that requests in the official Smash Ballot for K. Rool to become playable contributed to his addition.

GamesRadar+ writer Scott McCrae expressed a desire to see King K. Rool added to Donkey Kong Bananza, remarking that while the antagonistic VoidCo group revealed in the game's trailer seemed cool, they did not stand up well when compared with K. Rool. He believed it would be a "perfect cherry on top" of a game he considered his most anticipated of 2025. He acknowledged things he believed suggested that K. Rool would appear, including enemies called Crockoids that resembled his Kremling minions, and the fact that the King K. Rool amiibo was compatible. Hobby Consolas writer José David Muñoz identified a popular theory that the monkey leader of VoidCo, Void Kong, could be King K. Rool, arguing that since Donkey Kong could transform into other animals, so could K. Rool.

== See also ==
- Donkey Kong Bananza
- List of fictional crocodiles and alligators
- Donkey Kong Country
