= List of Donkey Kong video games =

Donkey Kong
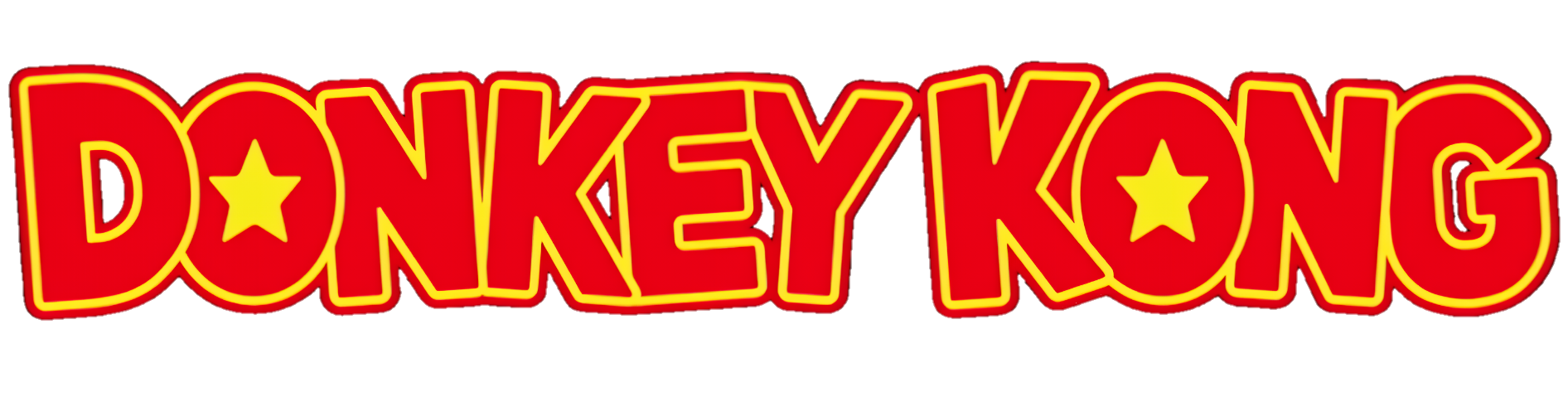
- Logo since 2024
- Genres: Platform; Action-adventure; Puzzle; Racing; Rhythm; Tactical role-playing; Edutainment
- Developers: Various: Nintendo R&D1 (1981–1983); Ikegami Tsushinki (1981); Coleco (1982–1984); Imaginative System Software (1982); Iwasaki Electronics (1982–1983); Roklan Corporation (1982–1983); Atari, Inc. (1983–1984); Woodside Design Associates (1983); Nintendo R&D2 (1983–1986); K-Byte (1983–1984); Softweaver (1983); Human Engineered Software (1983); SRD Co., Ltd. (1983); Syndein Systems (1984); Intelligent Systems (1984); Hudson Soft (1984); Sentient Software Ltd. (1986); Arcana Software Design (1986); International Technology Development Corporation (1988); Nintendo EAD (1994, 2004–2008); Pax Softnica (1994); Nelsonic Industries (1994); Rare (1994–2007); Namco (2003–2005); Nintendo Software Technology (2004–2015, 2024); Paon (2005–2007); Nintendo SPD (2005–2015); Capcom (2005–2006); Retro Studios (2010–2018); Monster Games (2013–2014); Ubisoft Milan (2018); Ubisoft Paris (2018); Hamster Corporation (2018–2019); Nvidia Lightspeed Studios (2019); Forever Entertainment (2025); Nintendo EPD (2025–present); 1-Up Studio (2025–present); tri-Crescendo (2025)
- Publisher: Nintendo
- Creator: Shigeru Miyamoto
- Composers: Various: Yukio Kaneoka (1981–1983); Hirokazu Tanaka (1983–1984); Taisuke Araki (1994); David Wise (1994–1997, 2005, 2014–2018); Eveline Fischer (1994–1997); Robin Beanland (1994); Graeme Norgate (1995); Grant Kirkhope (1995–1999, 2018); Junko Ozawa (2003–2005); Jesahm (2003–2005); Mahito Yokota (2004); Takashi Kouga (2005–2007); Yuichi Kanno (2007); Yoshitaka Hirota (2007); Kenji Yamamoto (2010–2014); Minako Hamano (2010–2014); Masaru Tajima (2010); Shinji Ushiroda (2010–2014); Daisuke Matsuoka (2010–2014, 2025); Riyu Tamura (2014); Naoto Kubo (2025–present)
- Platforms: Various: Arcade; Game & Watch; Intellivision; ColecoVision; Coleco Mini-Arcade; Atari 2600; TRS-80 CoCo; Atari 8-bit computers; TI-99/4A; IBM PC; MSX; Atari 5200; PC-6601; Sharp X1; Apple II; PC-88; Commodore 64; VIC-20; MS-DOS; Amiga 500; Coleco Gemini; ZX Spectrum; Amstrad CPC; Coleco Adam; BBC Micro; NES; Famicom Disk System; Atari 7800; Game Boy; Nelsonic Game Watch; SNES; Nintendo 64; Game Boy Color; Game Boy Advance; Nintendo e-Reader; GameCube; Nintendo DS; Wii; Nintendo DSi; Nintendo 3DS; Wii U; NES Classic Edition; SNES Classic Edition; Nintendo Switch; Nvidia Shield; Nintendo Switch 2
- First release: Donkey Kong; July 9, 1981
- Latest release: Donkey Kong Bananza; July 17, 2025
- Spin-offs: Mario

Donkey Kong is a video game franchise created by Shigeru Miyamoto and published by Nintendo. The franchise is centered on the anthropomorphic gorilla Donkey Kong and his clan of other apes and monkeys. Games in the franchise have been developed by a variety of developers including Nintendo, Rare, Paon and Retro Studios. While the first games were arcade releases, most Donkey Kong games have been released for Nintendo consoles and handhelds since the third generation. Most of the games in the franchise are platform games, although the series also includes spin-offs in other genres, such as racing and rhythm games. The majority of the games feature Donkey Kong as the main playable character, but other supporting characters also appear throughout the series, some of whom are playable.

The franchise debuted in 1981 with the arcade game Donkey Kong, which was a sales success that brought Nintendo into the North American market. The original arcade games received ports to various third-party home consoles, which were developed by several companies. The Donkey Kong franchise has sold a total of over 83 million copies as of 2023 (counting the several ports of the arcade game). The success of the series is commonly attributed to its technical innovation and entertaining platforming sequences.

original Donkey Kong and Donkey Kong Jr. arcade cabinets

== Arcade video games ==
Game	Details
Donkey Kong Original release date(s): JP: July 9, 1981; NA: July 31, 1981	Release years by system: 1981 – Arcade, Atari 2600 1982 – Intellivision, ColecoVision, Tabletop miniarcade 1983 – Famicom, Commodore 64, Apple II, IBM PC, TI-99/4A, Atari 8-bit 1986 – Nintendo Entertainment System, Amstrad CPC; 1988 – Atari 7800, Famicom Disk System; 1999 – Nintendo 64 (within Donkey Kong 64); 2001 – GameCube (within Animal Crossing); 2002 – Nintendo e-Reader; 2004 – Game Boy Advance; 2006 – Wii Virtual Console; 2013 - Wii U Virtual Console, Nintendo 3DS Virtual Console; 2018 – Nintendo Classics
Donkey Kong Original release date(s): JP: July 9, 1981; NA: July 31, 1981	Notes: The arcade version was developed by Nintendo.; Shigeru Miyamoto created it to replace the failed arcade game Radar Scope and to keep Nintendo afloat as a company.; Donkey Kong was a huge success and sold thousands of cabinets.; The game introduced both Jumpman (now known as Mario) and Donkey Kong, two of Nintendo's most successful characters.; It was re-released in a number of home console versions, most of which were not developed by Nintendo, but instead by other third party developers.; Most of the home console versions cut at least one of the four levels originally seen in the arcade version.; Coleco manufactured the tabletop miniarcade version.
Donkey Kong Jr. Original release date(s): NA/JP: July 1982; EU: Late 1982	Release years by system: 1982 – Arcade 1983 – Famicom, Intellivision, Atari 2600, ColecoVision, Tabletop miniarcade 1984 – Atari 8-bit 1986 – Nintendo Entertainment System; 1988 – Atari 7800; 2001 – GameCube (within Animal Crossing); 2002 – Nintendo e-Reader; 2006 – Wii Virtual Console; 2012 - Nintendo 3DS Virtual Console; 2013 - Wii U Virtual Console; 2018 – Nintendo Classics
Donkey Kong Jr. Original release date(s): NA/JP: July 1982; EU: Late 1982	Notes: The arcade version was developed by Nintendo.; Donkey Kong Junior is the sequel to the first Donkey Kong arcade game.; Jumpman's name was changed to Mario in this title.; Mario also became the antagonist in Junior rather than retain his role as the protagonist from the first game.; The game was re-released in a number of home console versions similar to the extent of the original Donkey Kong by third-party developers.; Coleco and Nintendo manufactured the tabletop miniarcade version.
Donkey Kong 3 Original release date(s): NA: 1983	Release years by system: 1983 – Arcade 1984 – Famicom; 1986 – Nintendo Entertainment System; 2001 – GameCube (within Animal Crossing); 2003 – Nintendo e-Reader; 2008 – Wii Virtual Console; 2018 – Nintendo Classics
Donkey Kong 3 Original release date(s): NA: 1983	Notes: The arcade version was developed by Nintendo.; Instead of Mario, the player controls Stanley, who has to shoot Donkey Kong from below with pesticide in order to drive him away from his garden.; The game is a shooting game instead of a platform game like the previous Donkey Kong games.
Donkey Kong: Jungle Fever Original release date(s): JP: 2005	Release years by system: 2005 – Arcade
Donkey Kong: Jungle Fever Original release date(s): JP: 2005	Notes: The game was developed by Capcom.
Donkey Kong: Banana Kingdom Original release date(s): JP: 2006	Release years by system: 2006 – Arcade
Donkey Kong: Banana Kingdom Original release date(s): JP: 2006	Notes: The game was developed by Capcom.; Sequel to Donkey Kong: Jungle Fever.

== Home console games ==
Game	Details
Donkey Kong Jr. Math Original release date(s): JP: December 12, 1983; NA: June 1986; PAL: July 10, 1986	Release years by system: 1983 – Nintendo Entertainment System 2001 – GameCube (within Animal Crossing); 2007 – Wii Virtual Console; 2024 – Nintendo Classics
Donkey Kong Jr. Math Original release date(s): JP: December 12, 1983; NA: June 1986; PAL: July 10, 1986	Notes: The game was developed by Nintendo.; The game has two modes: one is a two-player mode in which the objective is to add numbers up to what Donkey Kong is holding, and the other is a single-player mode in which the player must solve algebraic equations.
Donkey Kong Country Original release date(s): UK: November 18, 1994; NA: November 21, 1994; EU: November 24, 1994; JP: November 26, 1994	Release years by system: 1994 – Super Nintendo Entertainment System 2000 – Game Boy Color; 2003 – Game Boy Advance; 2006 – Wii Virtual Console; 2020 – Nintendo Classics
Donkey Kong Country Original release date(s): UK: November 18, 1994; NA: November 21, 1994; EU: November 24, 1994; JP: November 26, 1994	Notes: The game is the first in the series to be developed by Rare.; It sold over eight million cartridges.
Donkey Kong Country 2: Diddy's Kong Quest Original release date(s): JP: November 21, 1995; NA: December 1995; PAL: December 14, 1995	Release years by system: 1995 – Super Nintendo Entertainment System 2004 – Game Boy Advance; 2007 – Wii Virtual Console; 2020 – Nintendo Classics
Donkey Kong Country 2: Diddy's Kong Quest Original release date(s): JP: November 21, 1995; NA: December 1995; PAL: December 14, 1995	Notes: The game was developed by Rare.; It features Diddy Kong and his girlfriend Dixie Kong instead of Donkey Kong.
Donkey Kong Country 3: Dixie Kong's Double Trouble! Original release date(s): NA: November 18, 1996; JP: November 23, 1996; PAL: December 13, 1996	Release years by system: 1996 – Super Nintendo Entertainment System 2005 – Game Boy Advance; 2007 – Wii Virtual Console; 2020 – Nintendo Classics
Donkey Kong Country 3: Dixie Kong's Double Trouble! Original release date(s): NA: November 18, 1996; JP: November 23, 1996; PAL: December 13, 1996	Notes: The game was developed by Rare.; It features Dixie Kong and her cousin Kiddy Kong instead of Donkey Kong and Diddy Kong.; Sales were lower due to the release of the Nintendo 64 system two months before the game's release.
Diddy Kong Racing Original release date(s): JP: November 21, 1997; PAL: November 21, 1997; NA: November 24, 1997	Release years by system: 1997 – Nintendo 64 2007 – Nintendo DS
Diddy Kong Racing Original release date(s): JP: November 21, 1997; PAL: November 21, 1997; NA: November 24, 1997	Notes: The game was developed by Rare.; Rare inserted two playable characters from their other games that were still in development: Banjo and Conker.; It was later re-released for the Nintendo DS as Diddy Kong Racing DS with extra content.
Donkey Kong 64 Original release date(s): NA: November 22, 1999; PAL: December 3, 1999; JP: December 10, 1999	Release years by system: 1999 – Nintendo 64
Donkey Kong 64 Original release date(s): NA: November 22, 1999; PAL: December 3, 1999; JP: December 10, 1999	Notes: The game was developed by Rare.; Donkey Kong 64 is an adventure game in the vein of Super Mario 64 and Banjo-Kazooie.
Donkey Konga Original release date(s): JP: December 12, 2003; NA: September 27, 2004; PAL: October 15, 2004	Release years by system: 2003 – GameCube
Donkey Konga Original release date(s): JP: December 12, 2003; NA: September 27, 2004; PAL: October 15, 2004	Notes: The game was developed jointly by Namco and Nintendo.; Copies of the game came packaged with the DK Bongos peripheral.; It is a rhythm game in the vein of the Dance Dance Revolution series.
Donkey Konga 2 Original release date(s): JP: July 1, 2004; NA: May 9, 2005; PAL: June 3, 2005	Release years by system: 2004 – GameCube
Donkey Konga 2 Original release date(s): JP: July 1, 2004; NA: May 9, 2005; PAL: June 3, 2005	Notes: The game was developed by Namco.; Copies of the game came packaged with the DK Bongos peripheral.; It plays similar to its predecessor, but features a different track list.
Donkey Kong Jungle Beat Original release date(s): JP: December 16, 2004; PAL: February 4, 2005; NA: March 14, 2005	Release years by system: 2004 – GameCube 2008 – Wii
Donkey Kong Jungle Beat Original release date(s): JP: December 16, 2004; PAL: February 4, 2005; NA: March 14, 2005	Notes: The game was developed by Nintendo EAD.; Players can control the game with a GameCube controller or the DK Bongos peripheral.; Some copies of the game came packaged with the Bongos peripheral.; It was later re-released for the Wii with New Play Control! and widescreen support.
Donkey Konga 3: Tabe-houdai! Haru Mogitate 50 Kyoku Original release date(s): JP: March 17, 2005	Release years by system: 2005 – GameCube
Donkey Konga 3: Tabe-houdai! Haru Mogitate 50 Kyoku Original release date(s): JP: March 17, 2005	Notes: The game was developed by Namco.; Played with the DK Bongos peripheral.; It was released exclusively in Japan.
Donkey Kong Barrel Blast Original release date(s): JP: June 28, 2007; NA: October 8, 2007; EU: February 25, 2008	Release years by system: 2007 – Wii
Donkey Kong Barrel Blast Original release date(s): JP: June 28, 2007; NA: October 8, 2007; EU: February 25, 2008	Notes: The game was developed by Paon.; It is a kart-style racing game.; The game was originally developed for GameCube and then moved to Wii.
Donkey Kong Country Returns Original release date(s): NA: November 21, 2010; AU: December 2, 2010; EU: December 3, 2010; JP: December 9, 2010	Release years by system: 2010 – Wii 2013 – Nintendo 3DS; 2019 – Nvidia Shield; 2025 – Nintendo Switch
Donkey Kong Country Returns Original release date(s): NA: November 21, 2010; AU: December 2, 2010; EU: December 3, 2010; JP: December 9, 2010	Notes: The game was developed by Retro Studios.; It was re-released on the Nintendo 3DS as Donkey Kong Country Returns 3D, and later on the Nintendo Switch as Donkey Kong Country Returns HD.; Based on the Donkey Kong Country games that were released for the Super Nintendo Entertainment System.
Donkey Kong Country: Tropical Freeze Original release date(s): JP: February 13, 2014; NA: February 21, 2014; EU: February 21, 2014; AU: February 22, 2014	Release years by system: 2014 – Wii U 2018 – Nintendo Switch
Donkey Kong Country: Tropical Freeze Original release date(s): JP: February 13, 2014; NA: February 21, 2014; EU: February 21, 2014; AU: February 22, 2014	Notes: The game was developed by Retro Studios.; It is a sequel to Donkey Kong Country Returns.
Donkey Kong Bananza Original release date(s): WW: July 17, 2025	Release years by system: 2025 – Nintendo Switch 2
Donkey Kong Bananza Original release date(s): WW: July 17, 2025	Notes: The game was developed by Nintendo EPD.; It is the second 3D platformer in the Donkey Kong series, following Donkey Kong 64.

== Portable and handheld games ==
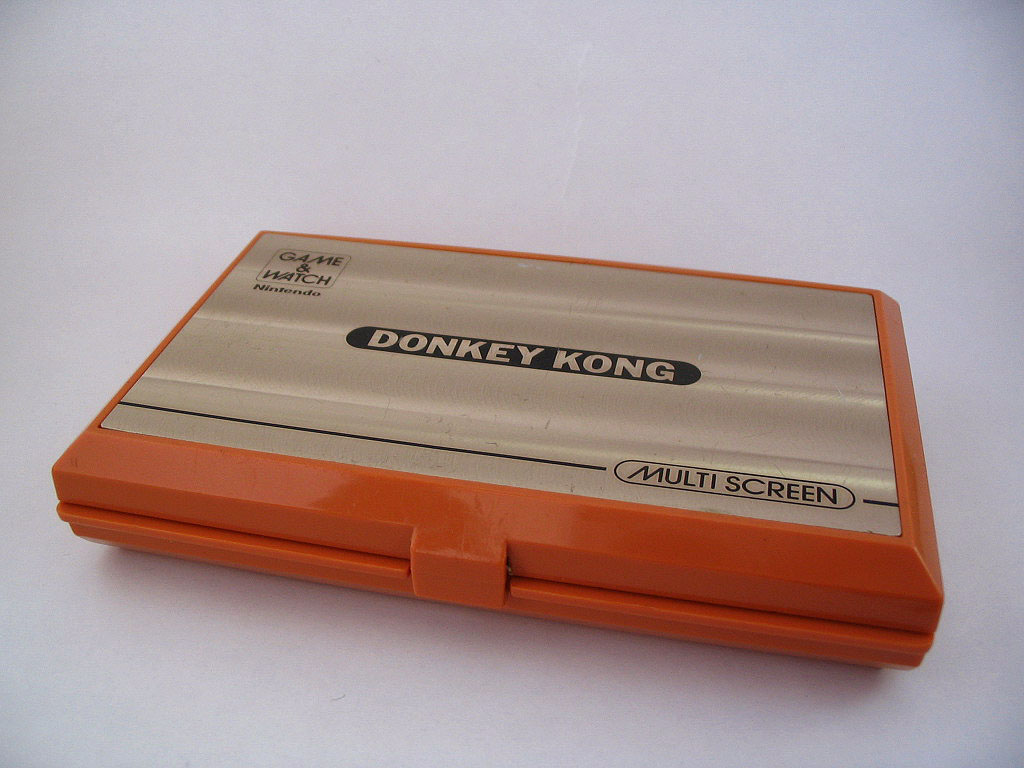
A closed, orange dual-screen, handheld Donkey Kong Game & Watch system.

Game	Details
Donkey Kong (Game & Watch) Original release date(s): NA: June 3, 1982	Release years by system: 1982 – Game & Watch 1998 – Game Boy Color; 2002 – Game Boy Advance; 2009 – Nintendo DS
Donkey Kong (Game & Watch) Original release date(s): NA: June 3, 1982	Notes: The handheld was developed by Nintendo.; Like the arcade Donkey Kong, Mario must climb a building while avoiding barrels; however, beating the game is different from the arcade version. The player must trigger a lever on the upper screen, activating a hook, which Mario must then jump on to and catch. If the player succeeds, a peg will be removed and Mario will return to the starting point, but if the player does not, Mario will fall to the ground and lose a life. Removing all available pegs in this manner will cause Donkey Kong's platform to collapse, and he will fall to the ground.; Donkey Kong was released in a dual-screen format.; This Game & Watch version was later re-released in Game & Watch compilation games for the Game Boy Color and Game Boy Advance.; It was included as one of the games in Game & Watch Collection, a Club Nintendo exclusive release for Nintendo DS.
Donkey Kong Jr. (Game & Watch) Original release date(s): NA: October 26, 1982	Release years by system: 1982 – Game & Watch 1998 – Game Boy Color; 2002 – Game Boy Advance; 2010 – DSiWare
Donkey Kong Jr. (Game & Watch) Original release date(s): NA: October 26, 1982	Notes: The handheld was developed by Nintendo.; Donkey Kong Junior was released in a widescreen format.; This Game & Watch version of Donkey Kong Junior was later re-released in Game & Watch compilation games for the Game Boy Color and Game Boy Advance and as DSiWare download in 2010.
Donkey Kong II Original release date(s): NA: March 7, 1983	Release years by system: 1982 – Game & Watch
Donkey Kong II Original release date(s): NA: March 7, 1983	Notes: The handheld was developed by Nintendo.; Donkey Kong II, a Game & Watch sequel to Donkey Kong Junior, was released in a wide-screen format in 1983.
Donkey Kong Circus Original release date(s): NA: March 2, 1984	Release years by system: 1984 – Game & Watch
Donkey Kong Circus Original release date(s): NA: March 2, 1984	Notes: The handheld was developed by Nintendo.; Donkey Kong Circus was an original title developed for the Game and Watch series.
Donkey Kong 3 (Game & Watch) Original release date(s): NA: August 20, 1984	Release years by system: 1984 – Game & Watch 2002 – Game Boy Advance
Donkey Kong 3 (Game & Watch) Original release date(s): NA: August 20, 1984	Notes: The handheld was developed by Nintendo.; A version of this game was included in Game & Watch Gallery 4 for the Game Boy Advance.
Donkey Kong Hockey Original release date(s): NA: November 13, 1984	Release years by system: 1984 – Game & Watch
Donkey Kong Hockey Original release date(s): NA: November 13, 1984	Notes: The handheld was developed by Nintendo.; Donkey Kong Hockey was an original title developed for the Game and Watch series. It was developed by Nintendo R&D1 and released in 1984 as part of the Game & Watch Micro Vs. series. The game features one LCD screen and two attached control pads. The hockey features Donkey Kong as one of the players and Mario as the other.
Donkey Kong (Game Boy) Original release date(s): JP: June 14, 1994; NA: July 22, 1994; PAL: September 24, 1994	Release years by system: 1994 – Game Boy 2011 – Nintendo 3DS; 2025 – Nintendo Classics
Donkey Kong (Game Boy) Original release date(s): JP: June 14, 1994; NA: July 22, 1994; PAL: September 24, 1994	Notes: The game was developed by Nintendo.; The game is based on the original Donkey Kong; it features the first four arcade levels, but from there, features ninety-six more levels and becomes a hybrid between Donkey Kong, Donkey Kong Jr., and Super Mario Bros. 2.; The game was later re-released for Nintendo 3DS Virtual Console download.; On March 7, 2025, the game was re-released as part of Nintendo Switch Online's Game Boy application.
Donkey Kong (Nelsonic Game Watch) Original release date(s): NA: 1994	Release years by system: 1994 – Nelsonic Game Watch
Donkey Kong (Nelsonic Game Watch) Original release date(s): NA: 1994	Notes: Like the arcade Donkey Kong, Mario must climb a building while avoiding barrels.
Donkey Kong Land Original release date(s): NA: June 26, 1995; JP: July 27, 1995; PAL: August 24, 1995	Release years by system: 1995 – Game Boy 2024 – Nintendo Classics
Donkey Kong Land Original release date(s): NA: June 26, 1995; JP: July 27, 1995; PAL: August 24, 1995	Notes: The game was developed by Rare.; Donkey Kong Land is a platform game in the vein of Donkey Kong Country.; The graphics are enhanced if played via the Super Game Boy.
Donkey Kong Land 2 Original release date(s): NA: September 23, 1996; JP: November 23, 1996; PAL: November 28, 1996	Release years by system: 1996 – Game Boy 2024 – Nintendo Classics
Donkey Kong Land 2 Original release date(s): NA: September 23, 1996; JP: November 23, 1996; PAL: November 28, 1996	Notes: The game was developed by Rare.; It is extensively based on Donkey Kong Country 2, but due to the limitations of the Game Boy system, it is missing several features and has radically different level designs.; The graphics are enhanced if the player plays via the Super Game Boy.
Donkey Kong Land III Original release date(s): NA: October 27, 1997; PAL: October 30, 1997; JP: January 28, 2000	Release years by system: 1997 – Game Boy 2024 – Nintendo Classics
Donkey Kong Land III Original release date(s): NA: October 27, 1997; PAL: October 30, 1997; JP: January 28, 2000	Notes: The game was developed by Rare.; The game is extensively based on Donkey Kong Country 3, but lacks the exploration aspects seen in the home console game.; The graphics are enhanced if the player plays via the Super Game Boy.; An enhanced version for the Game Boy Color, titled Donkey Kong GB - Dinky Kong and Dixie Kong was released exclusively for Japan on January 28, 2000, over two years after the US and EU releases.
DK: King of Swing Original release date(s): PAL: February 4, 2005; JP: May 19, 2005; NA: September 19, 2005	Release years by system: 2005 – Game Boy Advance
DK: King of Swing Original release date(s): PAL: February 4, 2005; JP: May 19, 2005; NA: September 19, 2005	Notes: The game was developed by Paon.; The character uses pegs to swing to the end of levels instead of using traditional platforming methods.
Donkey Kong: Jungle Climber Original release date(s): JP: August 9, 2007; NA: September 10, 2007; EU: October 12, 2007; AU: November 1, 2007	Release years by system: 2007 – Nintendo DS
Donkey Kong: Jungle Climber Original release date(s): JP: August 9, 2007; NA: September 10, 2007; EU: October 12, 2007; AU: November 1, 2007	Notes: The game was developed by Paon.; It is the sequel to DK King of Swing.

== Mario vs. Donkey Kong ==
Game	Details
Mario vs. Donkey Kong Original release date(s): NA: May 24, 2004; JP: June 1, 2004; EU: November 19, 2004	Release years by system: 2004 – Game Boy Advance 2024 – Nintendo Switch
Mario vs. Donkey Kong Original release date(s): NA: May 24, 2004; JP: June 1, 2004; EU: November 19, 2004	Notes: The game was developed by Nintendo Software Technology.; It is a spiritual successor to the Game Boy version of Donkey Kong, which was a hybrid of the arcade game Donkey Kong, Donkey Kong Jr., and Super Mario Bros. 2.; A remake was released in 2024 for the Nintendo Switch.
Mario vs. Donkey Kong 2: March of the Minis Original release date(s): NA: September 25, 2006; EU: March 9, 2007; JP: April 12, 2007	Release years by system: 2006 – Nintendo DS
Mario vs. Donkey Kong 2: March of the Minis Original release date(s): NA: September 25, 2006; EU: March 9, 2007; JP: April 12, 2007	Notes: The game was developed by Nintendo Software Technology.; The game is a sequel to Mario vs. Donkey Kong for the Game Boy Advance.; It expanded on the previous game by using touch screen controls.
Mario vs. Donkey Kong: Minis March Again! Original release date(s): NA: June 8, 2009; EU: August 21, 2009; JP: October 7, 2009	Release years by system: 2009 – DSiWare
Mario vs. Donkey Kong: Minis March Again! Original release date(s): NA: June 8, 2009; EU: August 21, 2009; JP: October 7, 2009	Notes: The game was developed by Nintendo Software Technology.; The game was released exclusively through DSiWare download.; The gameplay is similar to that of Mario vs. Donkey Kong 2: March of the Minis.
Mario vs. Donkey Kong: Mini-Land Mayhem! Original release date(s): NA: November 14, 2010; JP: December 2, 2010; EU: February 4, 2011	Release years by system: 2010 – Nintendo DS
Mario vs. Donkey Kong: Mini-Land Mayhem! Original release date(s): NA: November 14, 2010; JP: December 2, 2010; EU: February 4, 2011	Notes: The game was developed by Nintendo Software Technology.
Mario and Donkey Kong: Minis on the Move Original release date(s): NA: May 9, 2013; EU: May 9, 2013; JP: July 24, 2013	Release years by system: 2013 – Nintendo 3DS eShop
Mario and Donkey Kong: Minis on the Move Original release date(s): NA: May 9, 2013; EU: May 9, 2013; JP: July 24, 2013	Notes: The game was developed by Nintendo Software Technology.; The game was released exclusively through Nintendo eShop download.
Mario vs. Donkey Kong: Tipping Stars Original release date(s): NA: March 5, 2015; JP: March 19, 2015; PAL: March 20, 2015	Release years by system: 2015 – Nintendo 3DS eShop and Wii U eShop
Mario vs. Donkey Kong: Tipping Stars Original release date(s): NA: March 5, 2015; JP: March 19, 2015; PAL: March 20, 2015	Notes: The game was developed by Nintendo Software Technology.; The game was released exclusively through Nintendo eShop download outside of Japan.
Mini Mario & Friends: Amiibo Challenge Original release date(s): JP: January 29, 2016; NA: April 28, 2016; PAL: April 29, 2016	Release years by system: 2016 – Nintendo 3DS eShop and Wii U eShop
Mini Mario & Friends: Amiibo Challenge Original release date(s): JP: January 29, 2016; NA: April 28, 2016; PAL: April 29, 2016	Notes: The game was developed by Nintendo Software Technology.; The game was released exclusively through Nintendo eShop download.

== Cancelled games ==
Game	Details
Untitled Sega-developed game Cancellation date: 1984	Proposed system release: Arcade
Untitled Sega-developed game Cancellation date: 1984	Notes: Sega obtained the license to develop a Donkey Kong game, but it was canceled after Sega's David Rosen and Hayao Nakayama arranged a management buyout from Gulf and Western Industries in 1984. The game featured a playable Donkey Kong as a parking attendant who had to avoid and guide parking cars.
Return of Donkey Kong Cancellation date: 1987	Proposed system release: Nintendo Entertainment System
Return of Donkey Kong Cancellation date: 1987	Notes: Return of Donkey Kong was advertised in the 1987 Official Nintendo Player's Guide, but was never released, and the advertisement remains the only evidence of its existence. It mentioned that Donkey Kong would have been the playable character.
Untitled CD-i game Cancellation date: 1993	Proposed system release: CD-i
Untitled CD-i game Cancellation date: 1993	Notes: A CD-i Donkey Kong game was developed by Riedel Software Productions between 1992 and 1993. It was part of a deal that granted Philips the license to use Nintendo characters in CD-i games, which resulted in Hotel Mario (1993) and three The Legend of Zelda games (1993–1994). The Donkey Kong game was canceled.
Donkey Kong Coconut Crackers Cancellation date: Released as It's Mr. Pants in 2004	Proposed system release: Game Boy Advance
Donkey Kong Coconut Crackers Cancellation date: Released as It's Mr. Pants in 2004	Notes: Donkey Kong Coconut Crackers was a Rare-developed puzzle video game that featured the ability to switch between top-down 2D graphics and a 3D isometric layout. It was scheduled to be released on December 7, 2001, but after the Microsoft acquisition, Rare reworked Coconut Crackers to remove Donkey Kong elements and released it as It's Mr. Pants in 2004.
Diddy Kong Pilot Cancellation date: Released as Banjo-Pilot in 2005	Proposed system release: Game Boy Advance
Diddy Kong Pilot Cancellation date: Released as Banjo-Pilot in 2005	Notes: Diddy Kong Pilot was a Rare-developed kart racing game that was intended as a handheld sequel to Diddy Kong Racing. It was scheduled to be released on March 4, 2002, but remained unreleased when Microsoft acquired Rare in September 2002. Diddy Kong Pilot was reworked to remove Donkey Kong elements after the acquisition and released as Banjo-Pilot in 2005.
Donkey Kong Racing Cancellation date: August 2002	Proposed system release: GameCube
Donkey Kong Racing Cancellation date: August 2002	Notes: Donkey Kong Racing was developed by Rare as a console sequel to Diddy Kong Racing. It was a racing game in which players rode on animals rather than vehicles. Following the Microsoft acquisition, Rare attempted to rework Donkey Kong Racing as a Sabreman game for the Xbox and Xbox 360 before canceling it entirely.
Freedom Cancellation date: 2016	Proposed system release: Nintendo Switch
Freedom Cancellation date: 2016	Notes: A Donkey Kong game, codenamed Freedom, was co-developed by Nintendo and Vicarious Visions for six months. It was a 3D platformer that emphasized traversal, with grinding on vines as a core mechanic. The game was canceled in 2016 after Activision Blizzard, Vicarious Visions' parent company, redirected its developers' focus to the Call of Duty franchise.
