= Donkey Kong =

Video game franchise

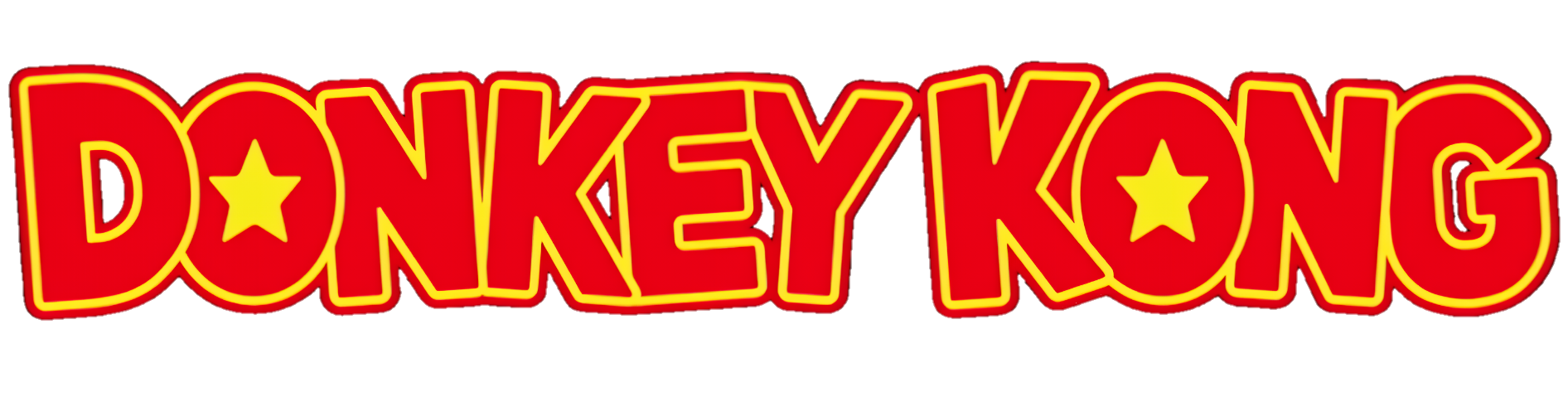
- Created by: Shigeru Miyamoto
- Original work: Donkey Kong (1981)
- Owner: Nintendo
- Years: 1981–present

Films and television
- Film: The Super Mario Bros. Movie (2023)
- Animated series: Saturday Supercade; Captain N: The Game Master; Donkey Kong Country

Games
- Video games: List of video games

Audio
- Original music: "Aquatic Ambience" "DK Rap"

Miscellaneous
- Toy: Lego Super Mario
- Theme park attraction: Super Nintendo World
- Related franchise(s): Mario; Banjo-Kazooie

Donkey Kong (Note: Japanese: ドンキーコング, Hepburn: Donkī Kongu; [doŋ.kiː koŋ.ɡɯ]) is a video game series and media franchise created by the Japanese game designer Shigeru Miyamoto for Nintendo. It follows the adventures of Donkey Kong, a large, powerful gorilla, and other members of the Kong family of simians. Donkey Kong games include the original arcade game trilogy by Nintendo R&D1; the Donkey Kong Country series by Rare and Retro Studios; and the Mario vs. Donkey Kong series by Nintendo Software Technology. Various studios have developed spin-offs in genres such as edutainment, puzzle, racing, and rhythm. The franchise also incorporates animation, printed media, theme parks, and merchandise.

Miyamoto designed the original 1981 Donkey Kong to repurpose unsold arcade cabinets following the failure of Radar Scope (1980). It was a major success and was followed by the sequels Donkey Kong Jr. (1982) and Donkey Kong 3 (1983). Nintendo placed the franchise on a hiatus as it shifted focus to the spin-off Mario franchise. Rare's 1994 reboot, the Super Nintendo Entertainment System (SNES) game Donkey Kong Country, reestablished Donkey Kong as a major Nintendo franchise. Rare developed Donkey Kong games for the SNES, Game Boy, and Nintendo 64 until it was acquired by Microsoft in 2002; subsequent games were developed by Nintendo, Retro Studios, Namco and Paon. After Donkey Kong Country: Tropical Freeze (2014), the franchise went on another hiatus until Donkey Kong Bananza (2025).

The main Donkey Kong games are platform games in which the player must reach the end of a level. Donkey Kong appears as the antagonist or protagonist; his role alternates between games. The original games featured a small cast of characters, including Donkey Kong, Mario, and Pauline. Rare's games expanded the cast with friendly Kongs alongside the Kremlings, an army of antagonistic crocodiles led by Donkey Kong's nemesis King K. Rool. Mario, the protagonist of the 1981 game, became Nintendo's mascot and the star of the Mario franchise, and Donkey Kong characters appear in Mario games such as Mario Kart, Mario Party, and Mario Tennis. Donkey Kong characters also feature in crossover games such as Mario & Sonic and Super Smash Bros.

Outside of video games, the franchise includes the animated series Donkey Kong Country (1996–2000), a themed area in Super Nintendo World at Universal's theme parks, soundtrack albums, and Lego construction toys. Donkey Kong is one of Nintendo's bestselling franchises, with more than 65 million copies sold by 2021. The original game was Nintendo's first major international success; it rescued Nintendo of America from a financial crisis, and established it as a prominent force in the video game industry. The franchise has pioneered or popularized concepts such as in-game storytelling and pre-rendered graphics, inspired other games (including clones), and influenced popular culture.

== History ==
=== 1981–1982: Conception and first game ===
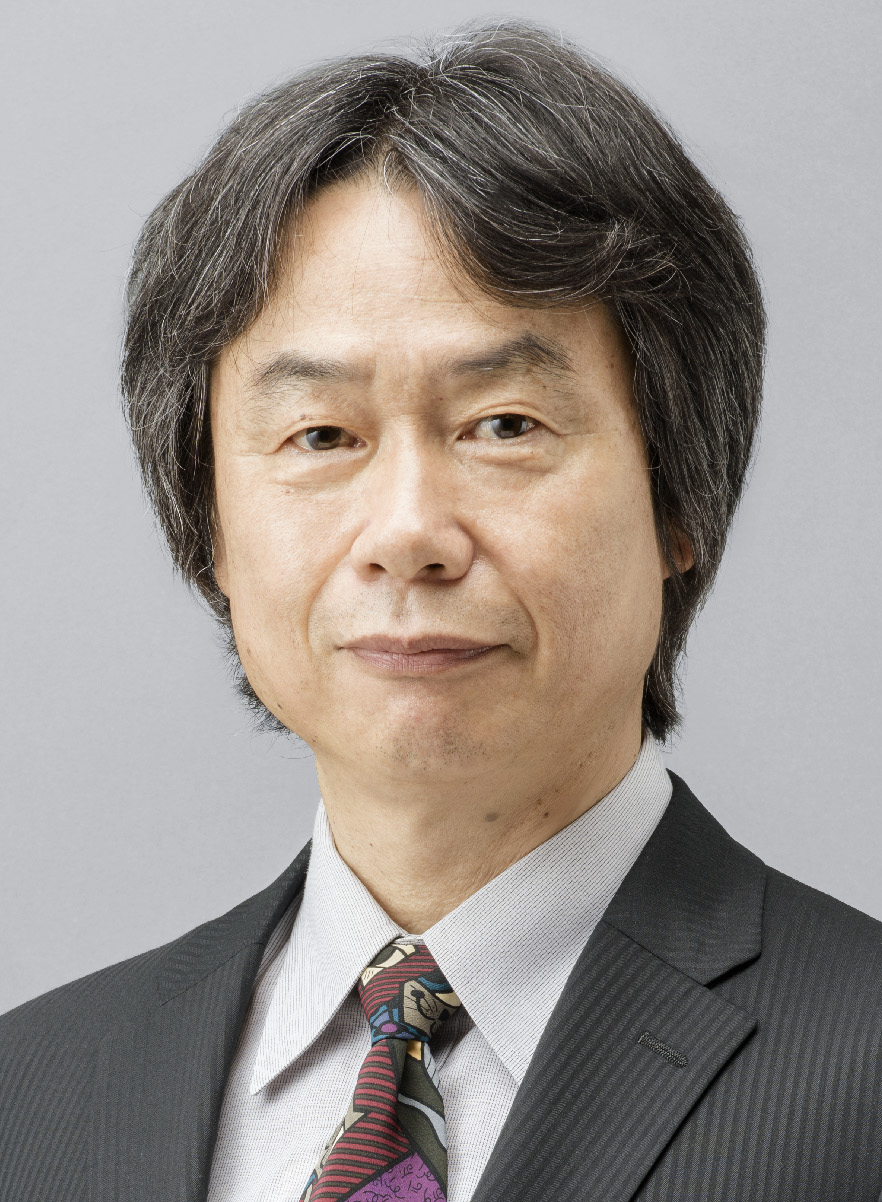
Donkey Kong creator Shigeru Miyamoto in 2015

In the late 1970s, the Japanese company Nintendo shifted its focus from producing toys and playing cards to arcade games. This followed the 1973 oil crisis, which increased the cost of manufacturing toys, and the success of Taito's arcade game Space Invaders (1978). In 1980, Nintendo released Radar Scope, a Space Invaders-style shoot 'em up game. It was a commercial failure and put the newly established subsidiary Nintendo of America in a financial crisis. Its founder, Minoru Arakawa, asked his father-in-law, Nintendo CEO Hiroshi Yamauchi, to provide a new game that could repurpose the unsold Radar Scope cabinets. Most of Nintendo's top developers were preoccupied, so the task went to Shigeru Miyamoto, a first-time game designer.

Supervised by Gunpei Yokoi, Miyamoto settled on a love triangle with the characters Bluto, Popeye, and Olive Oyl from the Popeye franchise, but a licensing deal between Nintendo and King Features fell through. (Note: Nintendo and King Features ultimately renegotiated the license to produce the arcade game Popeye (1982), which Miyamoto designed alongside Genyo Takeda under the production system that Nintendo adopted following Donkey Kong.) Bluto evolved into a gorilla, an animal Miyamoto said was "nothing too evil or repulsive". He was named Donkey Kong—donkey to convey stubborn and kong to imply gorilla. Popeye became Mario, the new protagonist, while Olive Oyl became Pauline, the damsel in distress. Miyamoto cited the fairy tale "Beauty and the Beast" and the 1933 film King Kong as influences.

Donkey Kong was one of the earliest platform games, (Note: Although Universal's Space Panic preceded Donkey Kong by a year, Red Bull wrote that Donkey Kong is generally considered the first "true" platform game for introducing the ability to jump.) with players controlling Mario as he ascends a construction site to rescue Pauline from Donkey Kong. Whereas previous platform games focused on climbing, Miyamoto placed an emphasis on jumping to avoid obstacles and cross gaps. He envisioned something akin to a playable comic strip that unfolded across multiple levels with unique scenarios. This was uncommon in contemporary arcade games, which typically featured a single scenario that repeated. As he lacked programming expertise, Miyamoto consulted technicians on whether his ideas were possible. Four programmers from Ikegami Tsushinki spent three months turning Miyamoto's design into a finished game.

Although Miyamoto's team was told it would be a failure, Donkey Kong became Nintendo's first major international success upon its release in July 1981. The $280 million windfall gain rescued Nintendo of America from its financial crisis and established it as a prominent brand in the United States. Donkey Kong achieved further success in 1982, when Nintendo released a Game & Watch adaptation and licensed it to Coleco for ports to home consoles. It grossed $4.4 billion across various platforms, making it one of the highest-grossing games of all time. In 1982, Universal City Studios filed a lawsuit alleging Donkey Kong violated its trademark of King Kong. The lawsuit failed when Nintendo's lawyer, Howard Lincoln, discovered that Universal had won a lawsuit in 1976 by declaring that King Kong was in the public domain.

=== 1982–1994: Sequels and first hiatus ===
Miyamoto and his team used game mechanics and levels that could not be included in Donkey Kong as the basis for a sequel. Miyamoto wanted to make Donkey Kong the protagonist, but the sprite graphic was too big to easily maneuver, so he created a new character, Donkey Kong Jr. The team still wanted Donkey Kong on top of the screen, so they conceived a plot in which Mario had caged him and Donkey Kong Jr. had to save him. To develop Donkey Kong Jr. (1982), Nintendo reverse-engineered Ikegami's Donkey Kong code, making it the first game that Nintendo developed without outside help. Following Donkey Kong Jr.'s release, Ikegami sued Nintendo for copyright infringement. In 1990, the Tokyo High Court ruled in favor of Ikegami, and the companies reached a settlement.

Donkey Kong 3, released in 1983, features shooter gameplay that departs from its predecessors. Instead of Mario, the player controls Stanley, an exterminator from the Game & Watch game Green House (1982), who must fend off Donkey Kong and a swarm of bees. Also in 1983, Nintendo released the Famicom, known worldwide as the Nintendo Entertainment System (NES), in Japan; two of the three launch games were ports of Donkey Kong and Donkey Kong Jr. The early library also included Donkey Kong Jr. Math (1983), an edutainment game based on Donkey Kong Jr., while Hudson Soft developed the Japan exclusive Donkey Kong 3: The Great Counterattack (1984) for NEC PC-8801, NEC PC-6601, and Sharp X1. Donkey Kong 3 and Donkey Kong Jr. Math were commercial failures. A line of other educational games was canceled following the failure of Donkey Kong Jr. Math. Bruce Lowry, Nintendo of America's vice president of sales at the time, later called it "the worst game we ever sold".

Sega obtained the license to develop a game featuring a playable Donkey Kong as a parking attendant, but it was canceled after a management buyout from Gulf and Western Industries in 1984. Donkey Kong went on an extended hiatus, while the spin-off Mario franchise found success on the NES, cementing Mario as Nintendo's mascot. Donkey Kong's appearances were limited to cameos in unrelated games. Nintendo staff began discussing a Donkey Kong revival as the original game's tenth anniversary approached in 1991. They were unable to start a new game at the time, so they included Donkey Kong Jr. as a playable character in Super Mario Kart (1992). However, the discussions led to the production of the Game Boy game Donkey Kong (1994), the first original Donkey Kong game in ten years. It features Mario as the player character and begins as a remake of the 1981 game before introducing over 100 puzzle-platforming levels that incorporate elements from Donkey Kong Jr. and Super Mario Bros. 2 (1988).

The 1987 Official Nintendo Player's Guide advertised a Donkey Kong revival for the NES, Return of Donkey Kong, which was never released. In the early 1990s, Philips obtained the license to use five Nintendo characters, including Donkey Kong, in games for the CD-i format. Philips contracted Riedel Software Productions to make a CD-i Donkey Kong game; it was developed between 1992 and 1993, but was canceled. The 2020 Nintendo data leak included a prototype for Yoshi's Island (1995) featuring a protagonist who resembles Stanley. Its title, Super Donkey, suggests that Yoshi's Island began as a Donkey Kong game before it was altered to star the Mario character Yoshi.

=== 1994–1996: Rare and Donkey Kong Country ===
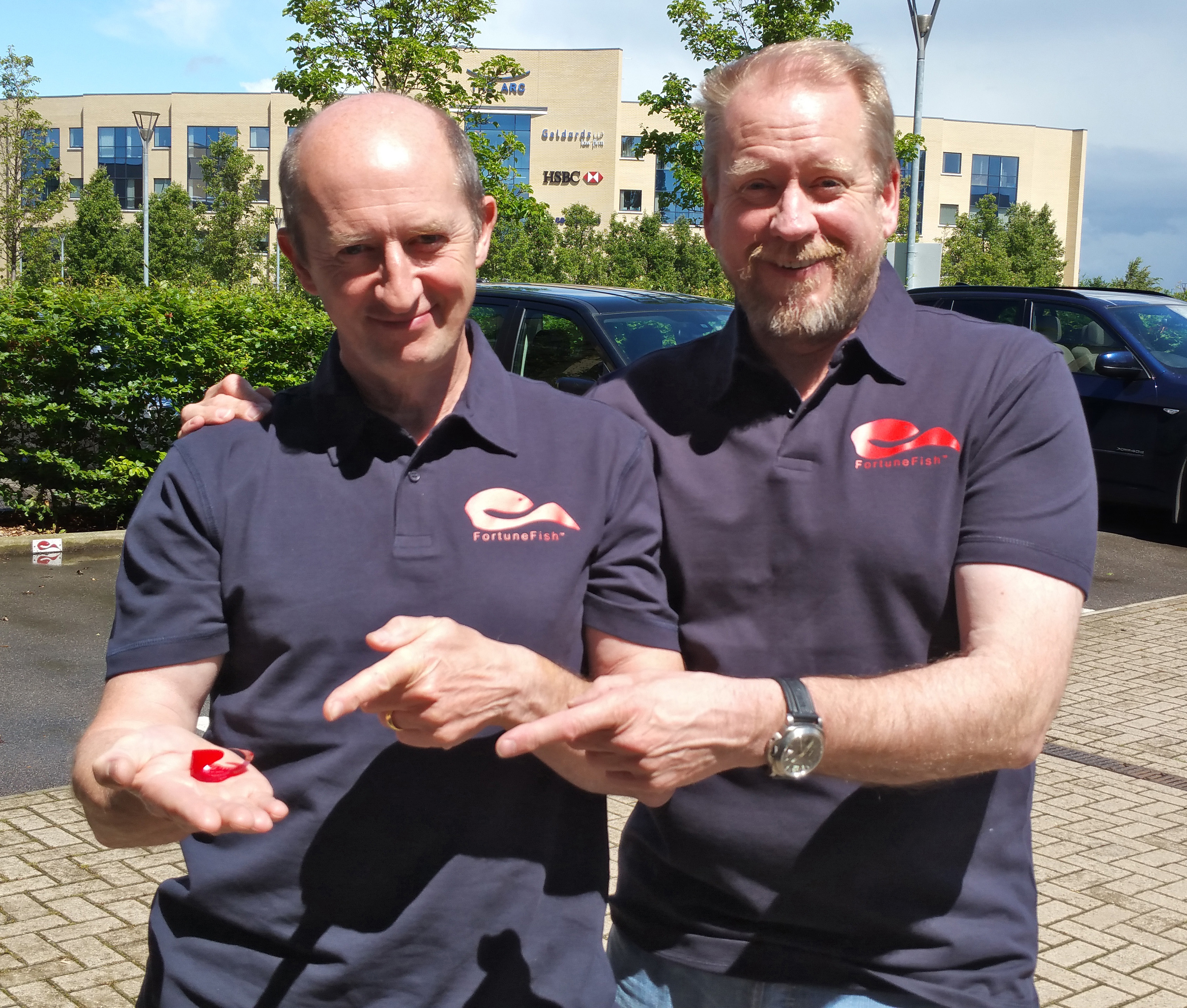
Rare founders Tim and Chris Stamper (pictured in 2015) led the development of Donkey Kong Country (1994), which reestablished Donkey Kong as a major franchise.

Around 1992, Rare, a British developer founded by the brothers Tim and Chris Stamper, purchased Silicon Graphics, Inc. (SGI) Challenge workstations with Alias rendering software to render 3D models. The move made Rare the most technologically advanced UK developer and situated them high in the international market. Rare began experimenting with using the technology in a boxing game. At the time, Nintendo was embroiled in a console war with Sega, whose Genesis competed with the Super Nintendo Entertainment System (SNES). Nintendo wanted to compete with Sega's Aladdin (1993), which features graphics by Disney animators. Lincoln, who became a Nintendo of America executive following the Universal lawsuit, learned of Rare's SGI experiments during a trip to Europe.

After impressing Nintendo with a demonstration, Tim Stamper suggested developing a platform game that used pre-rendered 3D graphics. Nintendo granted the Stampers permission to use the Donkey Kong intellectual property; some sources indicate that the Stampers requested this, though the designer Gregg Mayles recalled that it was Nintendo that requested a Donkey Kong game. Nintendo reasoned that licensing Donkey Kong posed minimal risk as the franchise was dormant. Rare's reboot, Donkey Kong Country (1994), features side-scrolling gameplay that Mayles based on the Super Mario series. It was the first Donkey Kong game neither directed nor produced by Miyamoto, though he provided support and contributed design ideas.

Donkey Kong Country was one of the first games for a mainstream home video game console to use pre-rendered graphics, achieved through a compression technique that allowed Rare to convert 3D models into SNES sprites with little loss of detail. Because Donkey Kong did not have much of an established universe, Rare was free to expand it, introducing Donkey Kong's sidekick Diddy Kong (who replaced Donkey Kong Jr.) and the antagonistic Kremlings. After 18 months of development, Donkey Kong Country was released in November 1994 to acclaim, with critics hailing its visuals as groundbreaking. (Note: Attributed to multiple references: Diehard GameFan, Electronic Gaming Monthly, Next Generation, and Total!) It was a major success, selling 9.3 million copies and becoming the third-bestselling SNES game. It reestablished Donkey Kong as a major Nintendo franchise and heralded Donkey Kong's transition from villain to hero. Miyamoto felt Rare had "breathed new life into" Donkey Kong and demonstrated that it could be trusted with the franchise. Following the success, Nintendo purchased a large minority stake in Rare.

Rare began developing concepts for a Donkey Kong Country sequel during production, and Nintendo green-lit the project immediately after the success. Donkey Kong Country 2, released in 1995, features Diddy rescuing a kidnapped Donkey Kong and introduces Diddy's girlfriend Dixie Kong. It was designed to be less linear and more challenging, with a theme reflecting Mayles' fascination with pirates. Diddy's Kong Quest was a critical success and is the sixth-bestselling SNES game. Following Diddy's Kong Quest, the Donkey Kong Country team split in two, with one half working on Donkey Kong Country 3 (1996). Dixie Kong's Double Trouble features Dixie and a new character, Kiddy Kong, as the protagonists, and incorporates 3D-esque gameplay and Zelda-inspired role-playing elements. Although it was released late in the SNES lifespan and after the launch of the Nintendo 64, Dixie Kong's Double Trouble! sold well.

=== 1995–2002: Franchise expansion ===
Separate Rare teams developed the Game Boy games Donkey Kong Land (1995), Donkey Kong Land 2 (1996), and Donkey Kong Land III (1997), which condensed the Country series' gameplay for the handheld game console. Rare's Game Boy programmer, Paul Machacek, convinced Tim Stamper that developing Land as an original game rather than a port would be a better use of resources. A port of Country was eventually released for the Game Boy Color in 2000. Rare also developed a tech demo for a Virtual Boy Donkey Kong game, which was canceled after the system's commercial failure.

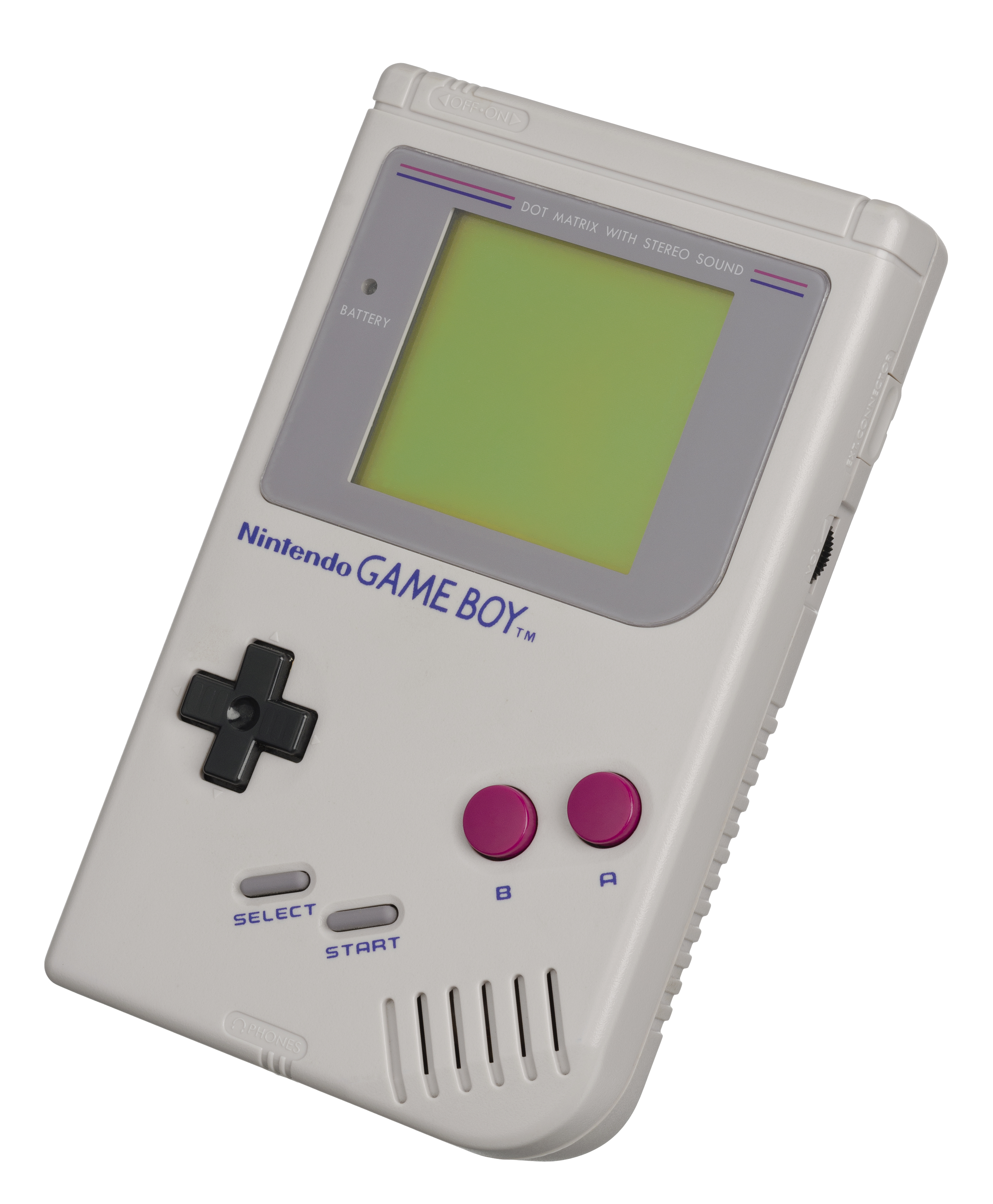
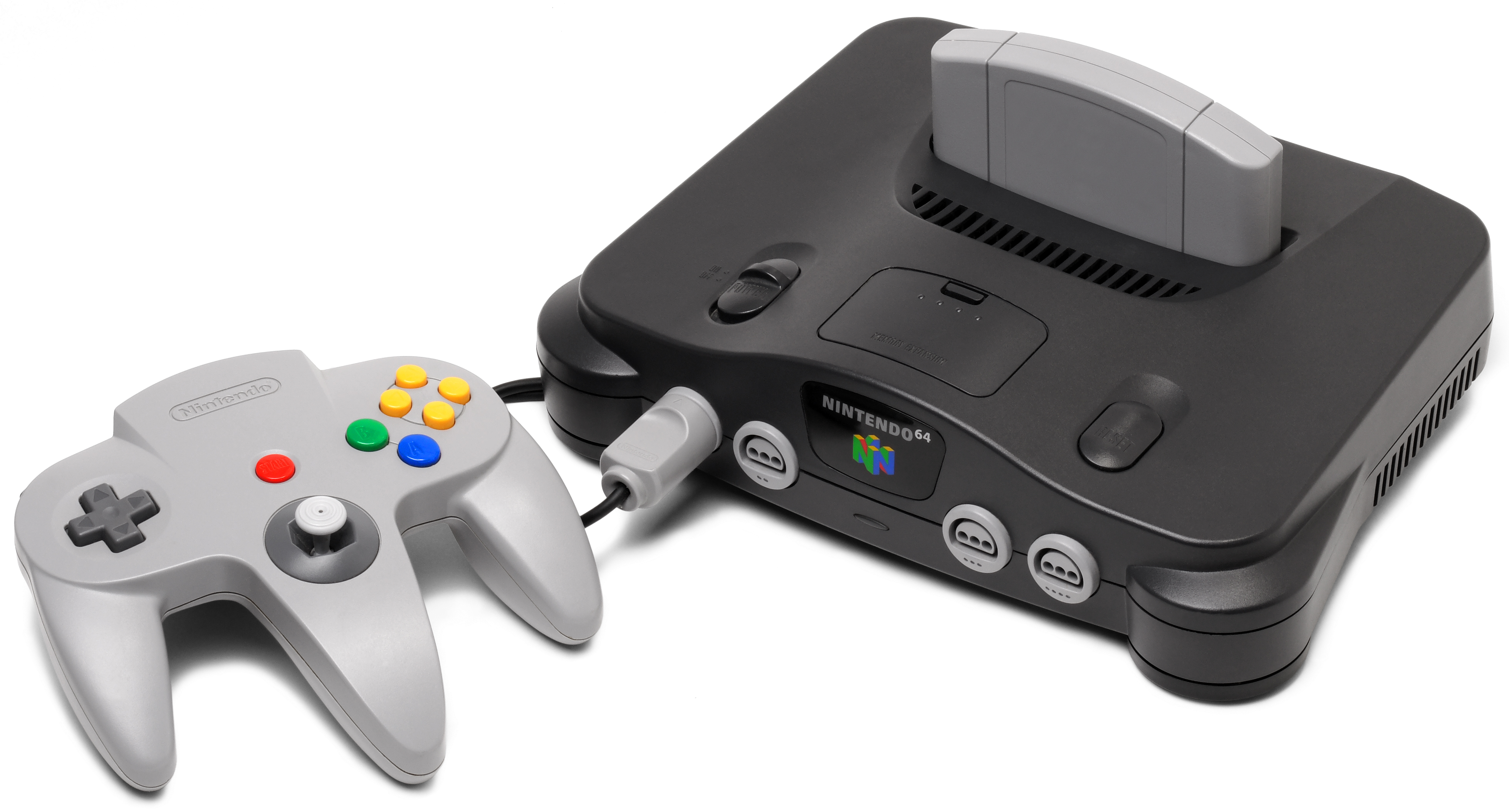
Rare developed further Donkey Kong games for the Game Boy (left) and Nintendo 64 throughout the late 1990s.

The first Donkey Kong game for the Nintendo 64, Diddy Kong Racing, a kart racing game, was released as Nintendo's major 1997 Christmas shopping season product. Rare originally developed it as a sequel to its NES game R.C. Pro-Am (1988), but added Diddy Kong to increase its marketability. It received favorable reviews and sold 4.5 million copies. Two characters, Banjo the Bear and Conker the Squirrel, appeared in Diddy Kong Racing before starring in the Banjo-Kazooie and Conker franchises.

In 1997, Rare began working on Donkey Kong 64, the first Donkey Kong platform game to feature 3D gameplay. They conceived it as a linear game similar to the Country series, but switched to a more open-ended design using the game engine from their 1998 game Banjo-Kazooie after 18 months. Transitioning Donkey Kong to 3D proved challenging since the technology was still new. The designers could not replicate the detail of Country's pre-rendering on the Nintendo 64, which rendered graphics in real time. Donkey Kong 64 was released in November 1999, accompanied by a US$22 million marketing campaign. It was Nintendo's bestselling game during the 1999 Christmas season and received positive reviews, though critics felt it did not match the revolutionary impact of Donkey Kong Country.

At E3 2001, Nintendo and Rare announced three Donkey Kong projects: the GameCube game Donkey Kong Racing and the Game Boy Advance (GBA) games Donkey Kong Coconut Crackers and Diddy Kong Pilot. However, development costs were increasing, the Nintendo 64 did not perform as well as Nintendo's previous consoles, and the GameCube was also expected to be a sales disappointment. Rare began looking to be acquired, but Nintendo did not see Rare remaining valuable in the long term and opted against acquiring them. In September 2002, Microsoft acquired Rare for $375 million, making Rare a first-party developer for Xbox. Nintendo retained the rights to Donkey Kong under the terms of the acquisition. Donkey Kong Racing was canceled, and Rare reworked Donkey Kong Coconut Crackers and Diddy Kong Pilot into It's Mr. Pants (2004) and Banjo-Pilot (2005).

=== 2002–2010: After Rare ===
After Microsoft acquired Rare, Nintendo relegated Donkey Kong to spin-offs and guest appearances in its other franchises, such as Mario Kart, Mario Party, and Super Smash Bros. In 2003, Nintendo and Namco released Donkey Konga (2003), a spin-off rhythm game. It was designed for the DK Bongos, a GameCube peripheral that resembles bongo drums. Nintendo of America executive Reggie Fils-Aimé opposed releasing Donkey Konga, concerned it would damage the Donkey Kong brand, but it sold well and received positive reviews. It was followed by Donkey Konga 2 (2004) and the Japan exclusive Donkey Konga 3 (2005).

Donkey Kong Jungle Beat, the first main Donkey Kong game since Donkey Kong 64, was released for the GameCube in 2004. It returned to the Donkey Kong Country style of platforming, controlled using the DK Bongos. It was directed by Yoshiaki Koizumi as the debut project of Nintendo EAD Tokyo. Koizumi sought to create an accessible game with a simple control scheme to contrast with more complex contemporary games. It received positive reviews, but was a commercial disappointment. A Wii version, featuring revised Wii Remote and Nunchuk controls, was released in 2008 as part of the New Play Control! line. A racing game that used the DK Bongos, Donkey Kong Barrel Blast, was developed by Paon for the GameCube, but was moved to the Wii with no support for the bongos. It was released in 2007 to negative reviews, with criticism for its controls.

Despite the acquisition, Rare continued to develop games for Nintendo's handheld consoles since Microsoft did not have a competing handheld. It developed ports of the Country games for the GBA and Diddy Kong Racing for the Nintendo DS with additional content, released between 2003 and 2007. (Note: Attributed to multiple references: GameSpot for the GBA ports, and IGN for the Nintendo DS port) Paon also developed DK: King of Swing (2005) for the GBA and DK: Jungle Climber (2007) for the DS, which blend Country elements with puzzle gameplay inspired by Clu Clu Land (1984). Mario vs. Donkey Kong, a spiritual successor to the Game Boy Donkey Kong that restored Donkey Kong's villainous role, was developed by Nintendo Software Technology and released on the GBA in 2004. It was followed by the DS sequels March of the Minis (2006), Minis March Again! (2009), and Mini-Land Mayhem! (2010).

=== 2010–2025: Retro Studios and second hiatus ===
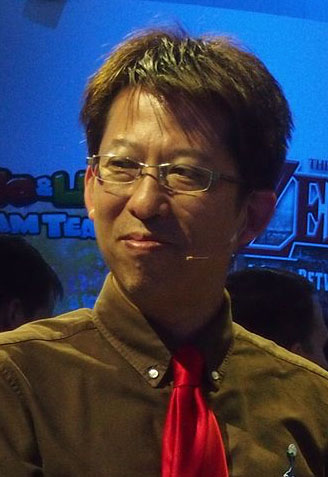
Kensuke Tanabe (pictured in 2013) produced the Retro Studios Donkey Kong games.

In 2008, Miyamoto expressed interest in a Donkey Kong Country revival. The producer Kensuke Tanabe suggested enlisting Retro Studios, which had developed the Metroid Prime series. With Donkey Kong Country Returns, Retro sought to refine classic Country elements and introduce mechanics such as surface-clinging and simultaneous multiplayer. Returns, the first original Country game since Dixie Kong's Double Trouble!, was released for the Wii in November 2010. It sold 4.21 million copies in under a month and received positive reviews, with critics considering it a return to form for the franchise. It was rereleased with additional content for the Nintendo 3DS in 2013, and for the Nintendo Switch in 2025.

Retro developed a sequel, Donkey Kong Country: Tropical Freeze, for the Wii U. The greater processing power allowed for new visual elements, such as lighting and translucency effects and dynamic camera movement. Tropical Freeze was released in February 2014 to favorable reviews, but sold poorly in comparison to Returns; Nintendo Life attributed this to the Wii U's commercial failure. It achieved greater success when it was ported to the Switch in May 2018, outselling the Wii U version within a week. Tropical Freeze remained the most recent major Donkey Kong game for over a decade, though the Mario vs. Donkey Kong series continued with Tipping Stars (2015) and Mini Mario & Friends: Amiibo Challenge (2016) for the Wii U and 3DS, and a remake of the GBA game (2024) with new levels and cooperative gameplay for the Switch.

Nintendo and the Activision Blizzard subsidiary Vicarious Visions, with consultation from Miyamoto, worked on a Donkey Kong game for the Switch for six months. Codenamed Freedom, the project was an open-world 3D platformer that emphasized traversal, with grinding on vines as a core mechanic. It was canceled in 2016 after Activision Blizzard redirected resources to the Call of Duty franchise, due to a reduced focus on single-player games and the declining sales of Vicarious Visions' Skylanders franchise. Details and concept art surfaced in 2024.

=== 2025–present: Donkey Kong Bananza ===
After Nintendo Entertainment Planning & Development (EPD) completed Super Mario Odyssey (2017), Koizumi directed them to develop a 3D Donkey Kong game. A programmer had been conducting experiments with voxel technology and destructible environments, which had been used to a limited degree in Odyssey. EPD realized that Donkey Kong's strength was a good fit.

The development of Donkey Kong Bananza, the first 3D Donkey Kong game since Donkey Kong 64, began on the Nintendo Switch and shifted to the Nintendo Switch 2 around 2021. Donkey Kong was redesigned to combine the expressiveness of Miyamoto's original design and his more cool and adventurous Country depiction. Pauline was redesigned as his young sidekick, and the Kremlings were reintroduced after a nearly 20-year absence. The producer, Kenta Motokura, said Bananza was an opportunity to establish separate 2D and 3D Donkey Kong series as Nintendo had done with Super Mario. Bananza was released in July 2025 to acclaim; reviewers described it as a triumphant return for Donkey Kong and the Switch 2's killer app.

== Story and characters ==
The original Donkey Kong features three characters: Donkey Kong, a large, antagonistic gorilla; Mario, the overall-wearing protagonist; and Pauline, Mario's girlfriend. Donkey Kong follows Mario as he ascends a construction site to rescue Pauline from Donkey Kong, his escaped pet ape. In the sequel, Donkey Kong Jr., Mario imprisons Donkey Kong in a cage. The game introduces Donkey Kong's son, the diaper-wearing Donkey Kong Jr. Mario, Pauline, Donkey Kong, and Jr. return in the 1994 Game Boy Donkey Kong, in which Mario again must rescue Pauline from the Kongs. The Game Boy game was the first Donkey Kong game to depict Donkey Kong wearing a red necktie bearing his initials, "DK".

Beginning with Donkey Kong Country, Donkey Kong's role shifted from antagonist to protagonist. Rare's Kevin Bayliss redesigned him; along with the red tie from the Game Boy game, he was given what GamesRadar+ described as "menacing, sunken eyes" and a "beak-like muzzle", and Bayliss designed him as blocky and muscular to make animating him easier. The Donkey Kong in Rare's games is a separate character from the one in the arcade games, who appears as the elderly Cranky Kong. Cranky Kong provides scathing, fourth wall-breaking humor in which he unfavorably compares current games to older ones like the original Donkey Kong. Nintendo has been inconsistent about whether Cranky is Donkey Kong's father, making the modern Donkey Kong a grown-up Donkey Kong Jr., or grandfather.

Rare's games moved the primary setting from a city to Donkey Kong Island, an idyllic isle. Because Donkey Kong did not have much of an established universe, Rare was free to expand it with new characters. Donkey Kong Country introduced Diddy Kong, Donkey Kong's sidekick and nephew. Diddy's design was based on a spider monkey; he was created as a redesign of Donkey Kong Jr. but retooled into a separate character at Nintendo's request. As a result, Donkey Kong Jr. has made few appearances since Country. Other supporting Kong characters that Rare introduced include Funky Kong, a surfer; Candy Kong, Donkey Kong's girlfriend; Dixie Kong, Diddy's girlfriend; Kiddy Kong, a large toddler; Chunky Kong, Kiddy's brother; Tiny Kong, Dixie's sister; and Lanky Kong, a buffoonish orangutan.

Country introduced King K. Rool, an anthropomorphic crocodile who is the series' main antagonist. K. Rool leads the Kremlings, an army of crocodiles who seek to steal Donkey Kong's hoard of bananas. Their name is a play on the Moscow Kremlin and their theme music incorporates Soviet influences. Polygon summarized K. Rool as an archetypal game villain who "often wears disguises and invents strange gadgets for his elaborately evil schemes", such as dressing as a pirate captain in Donkey Kong Country 2. The Retro Studios Country games introduce different villains: the Tiki Tak Tribe, a race of floating masks who hypnotize animals into stealing the banana hoard, and the Snowmads, Viking invaders who summon a dragon to take over Donkey Kong Island. Bananza introduces VoidCo., a mining company consisting of the villainous apes Void Kong, Grumpy Kong, and Poppy Kong, before K. Rool and the Kremlings replace them in a plot twist.

Although the Mario and Donkey Kong franchises largely remain separate, they take place in the same fictional universe. Donkey Kong and other Donkey Kong characters frequently appear as playable characters in Mario spin-offs such as Mario Kart, Mario Party, and Mario Tennis. Pauline appears in the 2017 Mario game Super Mario Odyssey as the mayor of the city from the original Donkey Kong. Bananza features a 13-year-old Pauline as Donkey Kong's sidekick, and implies that she is the original Pauline's granddaughter.

== Gameplay ==
=== Original series ===
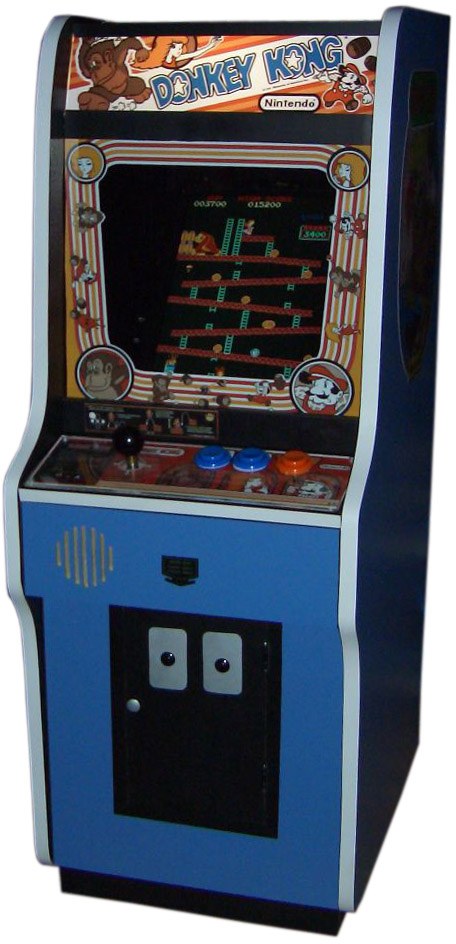
A model of an original Donkey Kong (1981) arcade cabinet

Donkey Kong and Donkey Kong Jr. are early examples of the platform game genre. In both games, the player must guide the playable character (Mario in the first game, Donkey Kong Jr. in the second) to scale four levels while avoiding obstacles. The player jumps to dodge incoming obstacles (such as barrels) or cross gaps, and climbs ladders or vines to reach the top of the level. In the first game, Mario can destroy obstacles by obtaining a hammer power-up, while in the second, Donkey Kong Jr. can do so by knocking pieces of fruit down from vines. Points are awarded for dodging or destroying obstacles, collecting items, and completing stages quickly. The player begins each game with three lives, which they lose if they touch an obstacle or fall.

Donkey Kong 3 departs from this gameplay: it is a shooter game in which the player controls Stanley, an exterminator who must prevent Donkey Kong from stirring up insects in his greenhouse. The player fires bug spray at Donkey Kong and enemy insects attempting to steal Stanley's flowers. They complete levels by spraying Donkey Kong enough to force him to the top of the screen or by killing all the insects.

The 1994 Game Boy game begins with the four stages from the original Donkey Kong, but after completing the fourth, the player is presented with over 100 additional stages that introduce puzzle-platform gameplay in which Mario must scout each level within a time limit to locate a key. Mario can pick up and throw objects and enemies, similar to Super Mario Bros. 2, and perform acrobatics to reach otherwise inaccessible areas of the levels. This gameplay would serve as the basis for Mario vs. Donkey Kong, which introduces stages in which Mario must guide six Mini-Mario toys to a toy box while protecting them from hazards. Mario vs. Donkey Kong's sequels make guiding the Mini-Mario toys the focus, with each stage requiring the player to do so with touchscreen controls. This gameplay has been frequently compared to the strategy video game Lemmings (1991).

=== Side-scrolling games ===
The Donkey Kong Country series features platforming gameplay in which players complete side-scrolling levels to progress, reminiscent of Nintendo's Super Mario series. The player progresses through a world map that provides access to the themed worlds and their levels. They traverse the environment, jump between platforms, and avoid enemy and inanimate obstacles. Each world ends with a boss fight with a large enemy. The Country series is known for its high difficulty level and emphasis on momentum, requiring players to react to oncoming obstacles quickly to maintain flow.

Players control one of the various playable Kongs, depending on the game: Donkey Kong, Diddy Kong, Dixie Kong, Kiddy Kong, Cranky Kong, or Funky Kong. The Rare games each feature two protagonists, with the newer protagonist carrying over to the sequel while another is introduced. The Retro Studios games star Donkey Kong with other characters as his sidekicks. Players primarily control one Kong, with the second acting as additional hit points. In the Retro Studios games, the second Kong rides on Donkey Kong's back to provide special abilities; for instance, Diddy's jetpack allows him to temporarily hover.

Barrels return from the original series and can be used as weapons, or broken to uncover power-ups. One barrel variant releases a partner Kong when thrown. Each level contains collectibles such as bananas, letters that spell out K–O–N–G, balloons, and puzzle pieces. These items can be found within the main level or by discovering hidden bonus stages, where they are earned via completing a challenge. Country's game mechanics also include blasting out of barrels that function as cannons, vehicle sequences with minecarts and barrel-themed rockets, and swinging vines.

In certain levels, the player can free an animal that provides the Kongs with special abilities, similar to the Super Mario series' Yoshi. Recurring animal friends include Rambi, a rhino that can charge into enemies and find hidden entrances; Enguarde, a swordfish that can defeat enemies underwater; and Squawks, a parrot who carries the Kongs or assists in finding collectibles. Outside the main gameplay, the Rare games' world maps contain areas where players can converse with non-player characters, such as Cranky, who provide advice, collectibles, and save points. The Retro Studios games feature shops (run by Cranky in Returns and Funky in Tropical Freeze) where the player can purchase items like power-ups and lives.

The Donkey Kong Land trilogy reflects the SNES Country gameplay, with different level design that accounts for the Game Boy's hardware limitations. Jungle Beat adds score-attack elements, challenging players to complete levels with as many points as possible.

=== 3D platformers ===
Donkey Kong 64 blends Country elements with adventure gameplay that emphasizes collecting items to proceed, reminiscent of Super Mario 64 (1996) and Banjo-Kazooie, as well as third-person shooting. The player explores worlds and solves puzzles tailored to the unique abilities of the five playable characters (Donkey Kong, Diddy, Chunky, Tiny, and Lanky). Donkey Kong Bananza similarly focuses on exploration and collecting items in open worlds, with many journalists comparing it to Nintendo EPD's previous game, Super Mario Odyssey. Bananza is distinguished by its destructible environments: Donkey Kong can smash almost every surface, destroy terrain, and rip pieces of the environment from the ground or walls.

=== Spin-offs ===
DK: King of Swing and DK: Jungle Climber feature settings and elements from the Country games, but require players to use the shoulder buttons to grab and climb pegboards to reach the end of a level. Diddy Kong Racing and Donkey Kong Barrel Blast are kart racing games that play similarly to the Mario Kart series, though Diddy Kong Racing features an adventure mode with boss fights, and Barrel Blast has the player shake the Wii Remote and Nunchuk alternatively to accelerate. The Donkey Konga trilogy was developed by the Taiko no Tatsujin developers and features the same gameplay: they are rhythm games in which the player must hit scrolling notes to the beat of the music with accurate timing, with stylized notes corresponding to different buttons. Players build combos by hitting two or more notes; the combo ends when they miss a beat.

== Music ==
The music for Donkey Kong and Donkey Kong Jr. was composed by Yukio Kaneoka, one of Nintendo's earliest audio engineers. Kaneoka wanted to take players on an adventure with a "pretty melody", which he compared to those in Disney films. He faced resistance from the designers, who wanted comical music to reflect the games' tone. Hirokazu Tanaka, a sound engineer who later garnered recognition for his work on Nintendo's Metroid and Pokémon franchises, also contributed, while Miyamoto wrote Donkey Kong's opening and closing music.

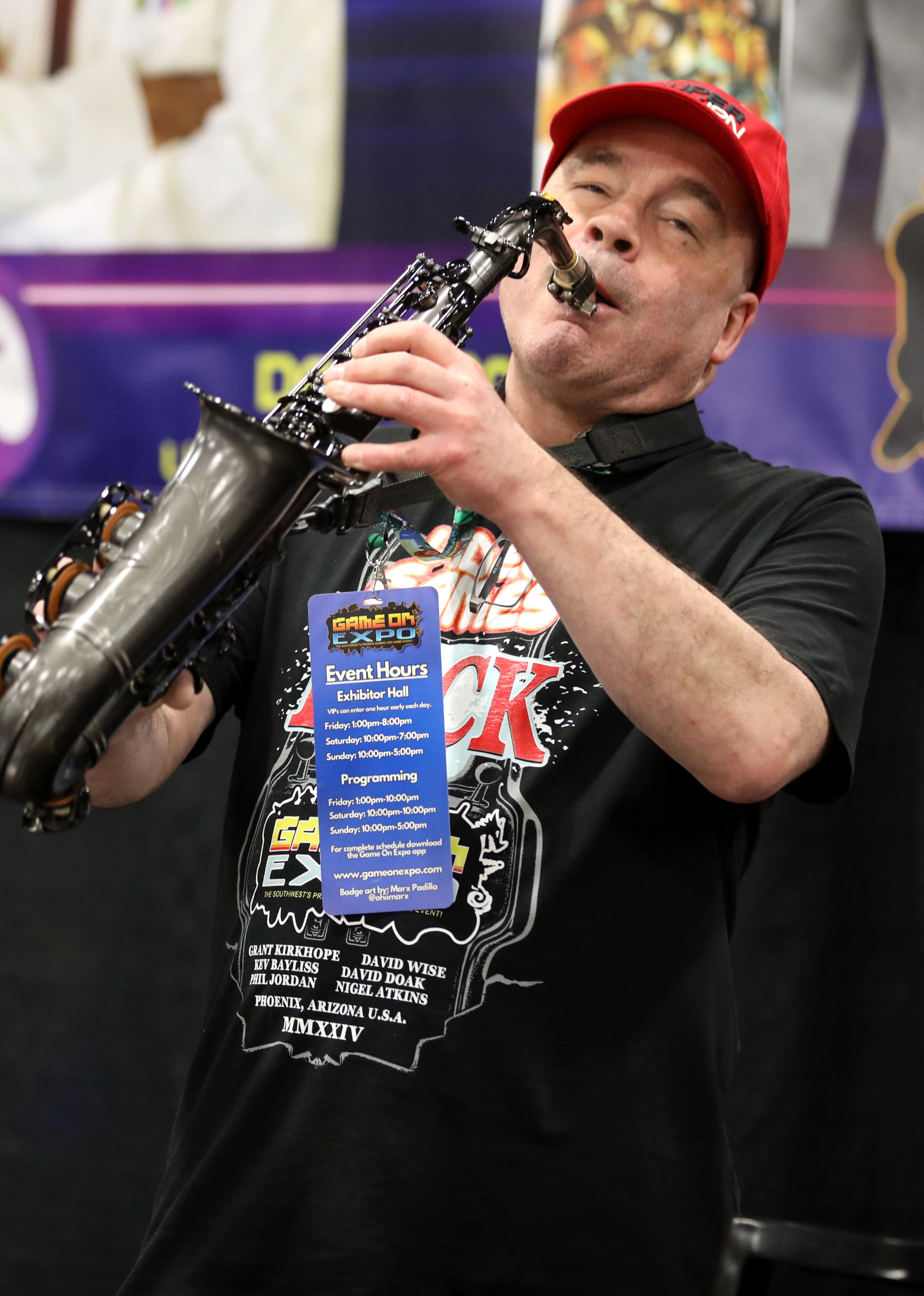
David Wise, the Donkey Kong Country series' primary composer

The Donkey Kong Country series features atmospheric music that mixes natural environmental sounds with melodic and percussive accompaniments. It was primarily composed by David Wise, who worked at Rare from 1985 to 2009. Wise drew inspiration from Koji Kondo's Super Mario and Legend of Zelda music, Tim and Geoff Follin's Plok! (1993) soundtrack, and 1980s synthesizer-heavy rock music, dance music and film soundtracks. He aimed to imitate the sound of the Korg Wavestation synthesizer. After Wise moved with a portion of the Diddy's Kong Quest team to work on Project Dream, Eveline Fischer—who composed a portion of the first Country—handled the majority of Dixie Kong's Double Trouble. Fischer attempted to give levels a sense of purpose and drew inspiration from film composers such as Alan Silvestri and Klaus Doldinger. Wise composed a replacement soundtrack for the 2005 GBA port of Dixie Kong's Double Trouble after Rare had problems converting Fischer's score.

Graeme Norgate and Grant Kirkhope adapted Wise's Country soundtracks for the first two Donkey Kong Land games, while Fischer adapted the Dixie Kong's Double Trouble soundtrack for Donkey Kong Land III. Fischer was set to compose music for Donkey Kong 64, but shifted to working on sound effects. She was replaced by Kirkhope, who composed alongside the Banjo-Kazooie games and Perfect Dark (2000). Nintendo Life described Kirkhope's Donkey Kong 64 score as closer in spirit to his work on Banjo-Kazooie than to Wise's Country music. Donkey Kong 64's introduction features the "DK Rap", a comedy rap song which introduces the Kong characters. It was written by Donkey Kong 64's director, George Andreas, scored and recorded by Kirkhope, and performed by Andreas and Chris Sutherland, with other Rare staff joining on the chorus.

Wise was unavailable during the development of Donkey Kong Country Returns, so Kenji Yamamoto took over. At the request of Miyamoto and Iwata, the Returns soundtrack mostly comprises rearrangements of tracks from the original Donkey Kong Country, plus some new material by Yamamoto. He focused on what Tanabe felt made Donkey Kong Country's music iconic, such as piano arrangements and the bassline. Wise left Rare during Returns' development and collaborated with Yamamoto on the Tropical Freeze soundtrack. Technological advances allowed Wise to achieve a "1940s big band jazz" sound that he had been unable to produce on the SNES. Beyond the Country series, Wise composed the Diddy Kong Racing soundtrack. Other composers who have contributed to Donkey Kong games include Mahito Yokota, who composed for Jungle Beat, and Lawrence Schwedler, who composed for Mario vs. Donkey Kong.

== Other media ==
=== Crossovers ===
Donkey Kong is represented in every game in Nintendo's Super Smash Bros. series of crossover fighting games. Donkey Kong debuted in the original Super Smash Bros. (1999) as the only heavyweight fighter, with slow but powerful attacks. Diddy Kong was added as a playable fighter in Super Smash Bros. Brawl (2008), while King K. Rool was added in Super Smash Bros. Ultimate (2018). Smash games also feature Donkey Kong stages and music.

Donkey Kong appears in Mario & Sonic, an Olympic Games-themed crossover between Mario and Sega's Sonic the Hedgehog franchise, as a playable character; in the Wii version of Punch-Out!! (2009) as the final boss; and in Mario + Rabbids Kingdom Battle (2017), a crossover between Mario and Ubisoft's Raving Rabbids franchise, as the protagonist of an expansion pack. The toys-to-life game Skylanders: SuperChargers (2015) includes Donkey Kong as a playable character in the versions released on Nintendo platforms.

=== Animated series ===
A Donkey Kong cartoon produced by Ruby-Spears aired as part of CBS's hour-long Saturday Supercade programming block in 1983. The cartoon follows Mario and Pauline as they attempt to capture Donkey Kong after he escapes from a circus. Game Informer described the series as "abysmal... filled with bad puns and ridiculous situations". Soupy Sales voiced Donkey Kong, while Peter Cullen and Frank Welker (who later garnered recognition for voicing Optimus Prime and Megatron in the Transformers franchise) voiced Mario and Donkey Kong Jr. Donkey Kong is also a recurring character in Captain N: The Game Master, a DIC Entertainment series that ran on NBC for 34 episodes between 1989 and 1991.

Donkey Kong Country, a television series produced by the French-Canadian company Medialab Technology, ran for 40 episodes between 1997 and 2000, bridging the gap between Dixie Kong's Double Trouble and Donkey Kong 64. Reflecting the games' pre-rendered 3D graphics, Donkey Kong Country was produced using computer animation, accomplished with motion capture technology. The series adopts a sitcom approach and follows Donkey Kong as he attempts to protect a magical artifact, the Crystal Coconut, from King K. Rool. The creative direction was largely dictated by the limitations of early motion capture technology; Simon Racioppa, one of the writers, noted restrictions including characters being unable to pick up objects and introducing new locations and characters being discouraged. Donkey Kong Country was produced with little input from Nintendo, and was the final Western series that Nintendo licensed before it shifted to producing and distributing anime. The series was popular in France and Japan, though less so in the United States. Retrospectively, Hardcore Gaming 101 criticized the series for lacking the adventure of the Country games, while GameSpot called its aged animation "nightmare fuel" and "visually disturbing".

=== Printed media ===
The first issue of Blip, a short-lived American comic book published by Marvel Comics in 1983, features a story in which a foolish news reporter attempts to interview Mario during the events of the original Donkey Kong. The story characterizes Donkey Kong as the result of a failed experiment to breed construction-worker gorillas. Blip marked Mario's first appearance in a comic book, years before Valiant Comics' Nintendo Comics System series in the 1990s. The British comics publisher Fleetway Publications published a promotional Donkey Kong Country comic in the UK in 1995, while Michael Teitelbaum wrote children's book adaptations of Donkey Kong Country, Donkey Kong Land and Donkey Kong Country 2.

=== Films ===
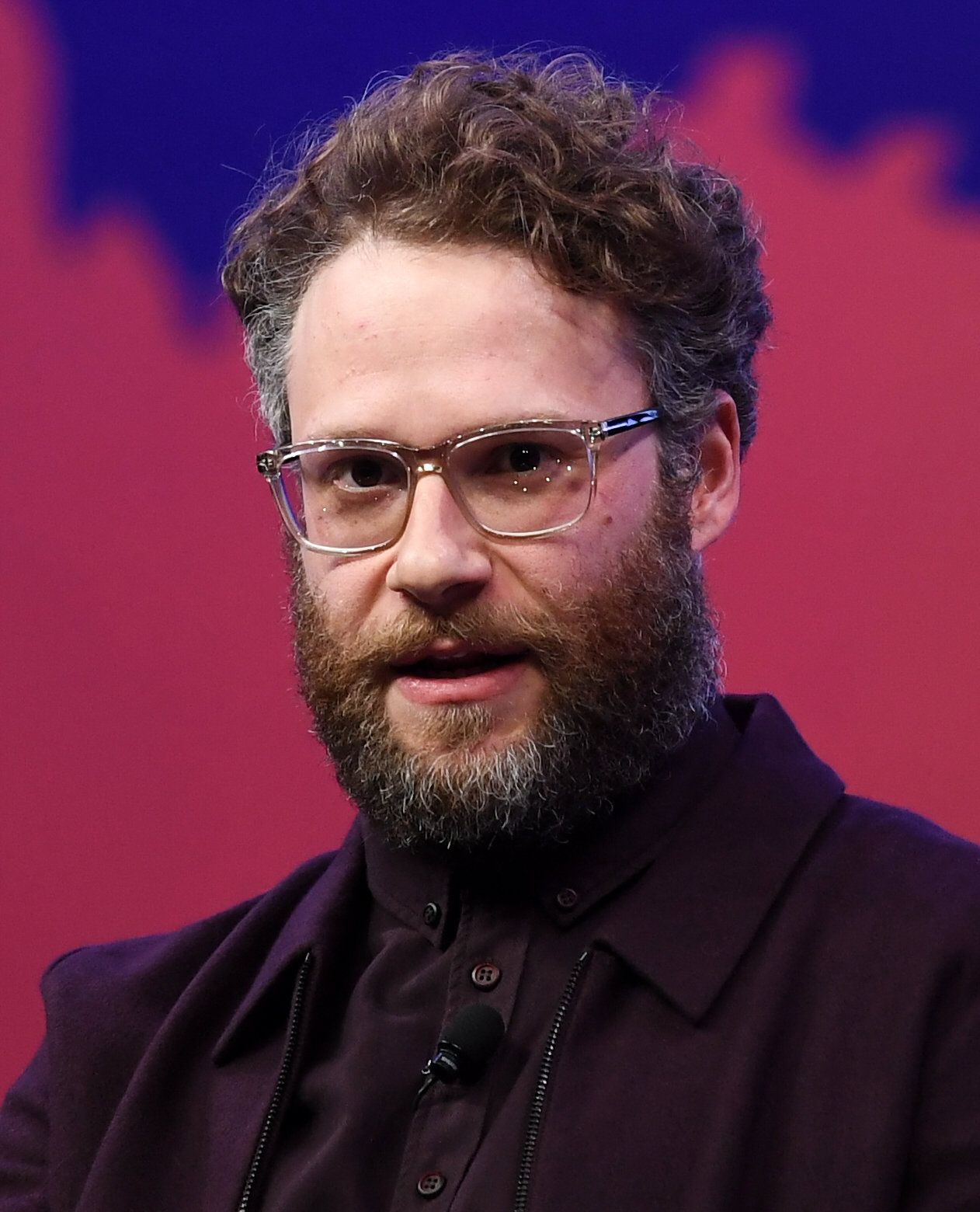
Seth Rogen voices Donkey Kong in The Super Mario Bros. Movie (2023).

Elements from the Donkey Kong franchise feature prominently in The Super Mario Bros. Movie (2023), a 3D animated film produced by Nintendo, Illumination, and Universal Pictures. Mario (Chris Pratt) and Princess Peach (Anya Taylor-Joy) seek the Kongs' help to stop Bowser (Jack Black) from invading the Mushroom Kingdom. Seth Rogen and Fred Armisen voice Donkey Kong and Cranky Kong, while other Kongs make cameos and the "DK Rap" plays during Donkey Kong's introduction. Donkey Kong was redesigned for the first time since Donkey Kong Country, combining elements of Rare's design and his original arcade-era design. The Super Mario Bros. Movie received mixed reviews, and Rogen received criticism for voicing Donkey Kong in his regular speaking voice. The film earned over $1.3 billion, making it the highest-grossing film based on a video game. Donkey Kong makes a non-speaking cameo in The Super Mario Galaxy Movie (2026) during a flashback sequence.

In November 2021, before The Super Mario Bros. Movie's release, reports emerged that Illumination studios was developing a Donkey Kong film with Rogen set to reprise his role. In June 2025, Nintendo and Universal filed a copyright notice for a Donkey Kong film via the United States Copyright Office.

=== Theme parks ===
In September 2021, Nintendo and Universal Destinations & Experiences announced Donkey Kong-themed expansions of the Super Nintendo World themed areas at Universal Studios Japan and Universal Epic Universe. Donkey Kong Country opened at Universal Studios Japan in December 2024 and expanded the size of its Super Nintendo World by 70%. It was designed with consultation from Miyamoto and includes a roller coaster, Mine-Cart Madness, based on the Tiki Tong boss fight from Donkey Kong Country. By the time the park opened the queue for Mine-Cart Madness already had a three-hour wait time. It also features a K–O–N–G letter collection game and Donkey Kong-themed food and merchandise. A similar section opened at Universal Epic Universe in 2025.

=== Merchandise ===
Donkey Kong merchandise includes clothing, toys such as plushes and Amiibo figures, trading cards, breakfast cereal, and soundtrack albums. The Lego Group began producing Donkey Kong Lego construction toys in 2023 as a subseries within its Lego Super Mario product line. Four sets, based on the Donkey Kong Country games, were released in 2023, followed by a set recreating the original Donkey Kong arcade cabinet in 2026.

== Legacy ==
=== Sales ===
Donkey Kong is one of Nintendo's bestselling franchises, with sales reaching 65 million units by March 2021. Five Donkey Kong games (Donkey Kong Country, Donkey Kong Land, Donkey Kong Country 3: Dixie Kong's Double Trouble!, Donkey Kong 64, and Donkey Kong Country Returns) have shipped over a million copies in Japan alone, and several have been added to Nintendo's Player's Choice and Nintendo Selects bestseller lines. Excluding rereleases and arcade games, as of 2022 the SNES version of Donkey Kong Country is the franchise's bestselling game, with 9.3 million copies sold worldwide, while DK: King of Swing is the worst-selling, with 280,000 copies sold worldwide.

Year	Game	Platform(s)	Sales
1981	Donkey Kong (Original)	Arcade, ColecoVision, Game & Watch, Nintendo Entertainment System	15.73 million (Note: Sales breakdown: Arcade: 60,000; ColecoVision: 6 million; Game & Watch: 8 million; NES: 1.13 million)
1982	Donkey Kong Jr.	Arcade, Nintendo Entertainment System	1.14 million (Note: Sales breakdown: Arcade: 30,000; NES: 1.11 million)
1983	Donkey Kong 3	Arcade	5,000
1988	Donkey Kong Classics	Nintendo Entertainment System	1.56 million
1994	Donkey Kong	Game Boy	3.07 million
1994	Donkey Kong Country	Super Nintendo Entertainment System, Game Boy Color, Game Boy Advance	13.31 million (Note: Sales breakdown: SNES: 9.3 million; GBC: 2.19 million; GBA: 1.82 million)
1995	Donkey Kong Land	Game Boy	3.91 million
1995	Donkey Kong Country 2	Super Nintendo Entertainment System	5.15 million
1996	Donkey Kong Land 2	Game Boy	2.35 million
1996	Donkey Kong Country 3	Super Nintendo Entertainment System	3.51 million
1997	Donkey Kong Land III	Game Boy, Game Boy Color	1.03 million
1997	Diddy Kong Racing	Nintendo 64, Nintendo DS	6.47 million (Note: Sales breakdown: N64: 4.88 million; DS: 1.59 million)
1999	Donkey Kong 64	Nintendo 64	5.27 million
2003	Donkey Konga	GameCube	1.18 million
2004	Mario vs. Donkey Kong	Game Boy Advance, Nintendo Switch	2.49 million (Note: Sales breakdown: GBA: 1.37 million; Switch: 1.12 million)
2005	DK: King of Swing	Game Boy Advance	280,000
2006	Mario vs. Donkey Kong 2: March of the Minis	Nintendo DS	1.52 million
2010	Donkey Kong Country Returns	Wii, Nintendo 3DS, Nintendo Switch	10.71 million (Note: Sales breakdown: Wii: 6.53 million; 3DS: 2.91 million; Switch: 1.27 million)
2010	Mario vs. Donkey Kong: Mini-Land Mayhem!	Nintendo DS	2.98 million
2014	Donkey Kong Country: Tropical Freeze	Wii U, Nintendo Switch	4.1 million (Note: Sales breakdown: Wii U: 2.02 million; Switch: 2.08 million)
2025	Donkey Kong Bananza	Nintendo Switch 2	5.05 million

=== Effect on the industry ===
If you can't imagine a world without Super Mario Brothers, without the NES, and maybe even without Nintendo at all, then you can't imagine a world without Donkey Kong. Both as a remarkable piece of game design and a commercial breakthrough for the single most important gaming company in Japan, Donkey Kong changed the world, and 30 years later we're still feeling its effects.

— Game Developer

The original Donkey Kong is regarded as one of the most important video games of all time. Its success established Nintendo as one of the video game industry's leaders. Computer and Video Games called Donkey Kong "the most momentous" game of 1981, as it "introduced three important names" to the industry: Nintendo, Shigeru Miyamoto, and Mario. Donkey Kong also paved the way for the NES, which rejuvenated the crashed Western game industry and shifted the home console market's dominance from the US to Japan. The NES was largely based on the Donkey Kong arcade hardware; Nintendo took a Donkey Kong arcade cabinet to the semiconductor chip manufacturer Ricoh for analysis, which led to Ricoh producing the NES's Picture Processing Unit.

Donkey Kong inspired many games, including clones such as Crazy Kong (1981) and Hard Hat Mack (1983), that featured a mix of running, jumping, and vertical traversal. These were initially referred to as "Donkey Kong-type" or "Kong-style" games, but eventually came to be known as platformers. While Donkey Kong was not the first platform game, VG247 wrote "it was the first to matter" by establishing the genre's template. Furthermore, Donkey Kong's spirited graphics, humor, and contextualization of the gameplay with a story distinguished it from contemporary arcade games. Donkey Kong is regarded as the first game to use graphics to tell a story, which GamesRadar+ said provided an unprecedented level of narrative depth.

Donkey Kong Country's pre-rendered graphics featured a level of detail unprecedented in console games at the time, and inspired many imitators. It inspired games such as BlueSky Software's Vectorman (1995), Naughty Dog's Crash Bandicoot (1996), HAL Laboratory's Kirby Super Star (1996), and Traveller's Tales and Sonic Team's Sonic 3D Blast (1996). Country's influence has carried into more modern games such as Mekazoo (2016) and Kaze and the Wild Masks (2021); the Australian Broadcasting Corporation credited it for demonstrating 2D games could remain relevant after the introduction of 3D. Yooka-Laylee and the Impossible Lair (2019)—developed by Playtonic Games, whose staff includes Rare alumni that worked on Country—was noted for its gameplay similarities to Country.

The Country games established Rare as a leading video game developer and set the standard for its work. Country originated conventions characteristic of Rare's later output, including an emphasis on collecting items, irreverent humor, visual appeal, and tech demo-like design. Conversely, Donkey Kong 64 has been blamed for precipitating 3D platforming's decline in popularity for its excessive emphasis on collecting items. Electronic Gaming Monthly wrote that whereas Super Mario 64 had "breathed life into the 3D platforming genre", Donkey Kong 64 had "sucked it all out". Jonas Kaerlev, who developed the 3D platformer A Hat in Time (2017), said Donkey Kong 64 gave the genre a reputation for tedium that contributed to a decline in interest.

=== Cultural impact ===
Donkey Kong was described by Game Informer as an iconic video game character prior to the stardom that Mario achieved. Donkey Kong has been described as a mascot for both Nintendo and the video game industry. (Note: Attributed to multiple references: Eurogamer, GamesRadar+, IGN, and Wired) In 2007, the Monster Jam racing series obtained the license to use Donkey Kong's appearance for a monster truck. The truck debuted in a December 2007 show in Minneapolis and toured with Monster Jam throughout 2008. Donkey Kong appears as an antagonist in the film Pixels (2015), which pays homage to classic arcade games, while the film War for the Planet of the Apes (2017) features treacherous apes nicknamed "donkeys", a reference to Donkey Kong.

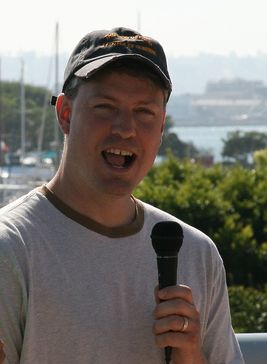
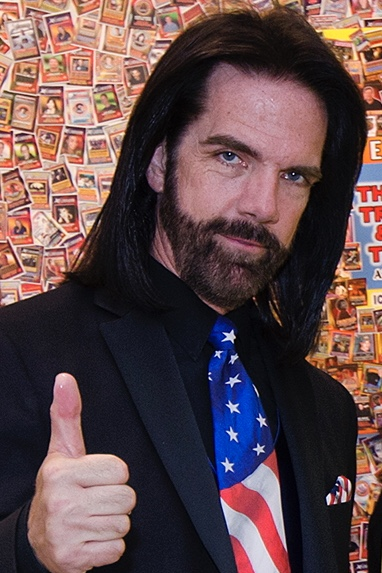
Donkey Kong high score competitors Steve Wiebe (left) and Billy Mitchell (right) feature in the documentary The King of Kong (2007).

The original Donkey Kong is a popular competitive video game. The Daily Telegraph called it "the most fiercely contested video game of all time", while Polygon wrote that achieving the highest score "is probably the most coveted arcade game world record". The King of Kong (2007), a documentary film directed by Seth Gordon, brought Donkey Kong's competitive culture to prominence. It follows two players, Steve Wiebe and Billy Mitchell, in their respective attempts to obtain and maintain the world record. The Telegraph described Donkey Kong competition as bitter and said the heated rivalries between players contribute to the game's lasting appeal. The Donkey Kong Country games are also popular in the video game speedrunning community.

IGN said that Donkey Kong Country's soundtrack contributed to an increased appreciation for video game music as an art form, and The New York Times called Country and Diddy's Kong Quest's soundtracks the video game equivalents to the Beatles' Revolver (1966) and Sgt. Pepper's Lonely Hearts Club Band (1967). Musicians such as Trent Reznor and Donald Glover have praised the Donkey Kong Country track "Aquatic Ambience". Glover sampled it in his 2012 song "Eat Your Vegetables", to which David Wise expressed approval. OverClocked ReMix has released Donkey Kong remix albums including contributions from Wise, Beanland, and Kirkhope. Curse of the Crystal Coconut, a 2020 pirate metal album by the Scottish heavy metal band Alestorm, contains numerous references to the Donkey Kong franchise, including its title; those who pre-ordered the album had a chance to win an Alestorm-branded Nintendo 64 with a copy of Donkey Kong 64.

Donkey Kong is noted for its active fandom. Nintendo Life described one fansite, DK Vine, as "highly respected". The franchise's lack of a detailed backstory has led fans to theorize its fictional chronology. Kotaku described one theory, which postulates that Donkey Kong Jr. was killed in a violent, off-screen conflict to explain his absence in the Country series, as "a fascinating example of how fandoms can run away with the smallest bits of narrative available" to rationalize inconsistencies. A team of fans led by animator Alex Henderson released DKC: Curse of the Crystal Coconut, an animated tribute short film, in 2021 to commemorate the franchise's 40th anniversary and the Donkey Kong Country television series' 25th anniversary. Several voice actors from the Country television series reprised their roles for DKC: Return to Krocodile Isle, a follow-up animation released in 2023.

In the years following the original Donkey Kong's release, the catchphrase "it's on like Donkey Kong" entered pop culture vernacular. The phrase has been used in television series, films, music, and news headlines; it is typically used to say something is "going down". It was popularized by the rapper Ice Cube, who used the phrase in his song "Now I Gotta Wet'cha" (1992), though it is unclear if he coined it. In November 2010, Nintendo filed a trademark request for the phrase with the U.S. Patent and Trademark Office as part of its marketing for Donkey Kong Country Returns.
