= Mario vs. Donkey Kong: Minis March Again! =

2009 video game

- Developer: Nintendo Software Technology
- Publisher: Nintendo
- Director: Yukimi Shimura
- Producers: Shigeki Yamashiro; Kensuke Tanabe
- Designers: Wing S. Cho; Stephen Mortimer; Masamichi Abe
- Programmer: Rory Johnston
- Artist: Brian McNeely
- Writer: Wing S. Cho
- Composer: Lawrence Schwedler
- Series: Mario vs. Donkey Kong
- Platform: Nintendo DSi
- Release: NA: June 8, 2009; PAL: August 21, 2009; JP: October 7, 2009
- Genre: Puzzle-platform
- Mode: Single-player

Mario vs. Donkey Kong: Minis March Again! (Note: Japanese: マリオVSドンキーコング ミニミニ再行進!, Hepburn: Mario tai Donkī Kongu Mini Mini sai Kōshin!) is a 2009 puzzle-platform game developed by Nintendo Software Technology for the Nintendo DSi. The third game in the Mario vs. Donkey Kong series, it is a follow-up to Mario vs. Donkey Kong 2: March of the Minis. It is the first DSiWare game to feature a level editor in which players can create custom-made levels and send them to players on other devices via a wireless Internet connection.

Minis March Again! was released via DSiWare in North America on June 8, 2009, in Europe and Australia on August 21, and in Japan on October 7. The game received positive reviews from critics, who praised its puzzle design, level editor, and longevity, with criticism aimed at its lack of originality. A sequel, entitled Mario vs. Donkey Kong: Mini-Land Mayhem!, was released in 2010 on the Nintendo DS.

== Gameplay ==
Minis March Again features puzzle-solving gameplay from the previous two games in the series. Just as in the game Lemmings, Mario must lead his Mini-Mario toys to the end of the level. Like with Mario vs. Donkey Kong 2: March of the Minis, players do not control Mario but instead miniature wind-up versions of Mario, Princess Peach, Toad, and Donkey Kong—referred to as "Minis"—in order to rescue Pauline from the game's antagonist, Donkey Kong. In each level, players must get all their Minis to the end of the level at a designated exit while avoiding obstacles and enemies (mostly consisting of enemies from the other games in the Mario series).

One difference from its predecessor is that all of the end of level bonuses are now required. In the previous game, extra points were earned by getting all Minis to the exit, getting them to the exit with no long time intervals between any two Minis, and getting them to the exit without stopping any of them. Also, in this game, the minis cannot be controlled. Only items and obstacles can be used to control their direction. Additionally, all minis must reach the door in time, otherwise, the door will lock up, and the player will fail the level.

Like with the first installment, there is a life counter system that uses M-Tokens. Players start with five lives, which are lost if a mini touches an enemy, touches spikes, traps, or any pitfalls, falls a distance of ten or more blocks, if the next mini fails to reach the door on time after one enters, or the timer runs out. Just like the first installment, the player can also lose a life if they restart or exit a level that they have not cleared. The game ends when the player runs out of lives, although they can replay the current level with five more lives by choosing "Retry". In each level, there is a Mini Mario card that must be collected (eight scattered in the levels and one in the Donkey Kong battle) to spell "M-I-N-I-M-A-R-I-O". When they are all collected, the player will unlock the special level.

At the end of each floor, the player must fight Donkey Kong to go to the next floor. The player always starts the battle with 6 Mini-Marios and Donkey Kong also starts at 6 hit points too, just like he did in the previous installment. The player must shoot the Mini Mario in a cannon to pummel Donkey Kong, except for the fourth floor, that if a Mini-Mario tries to hit Donkey Kong, it breaks. The player also has three minutes to defeat Donkey Kong. Sometimes, Donkey Kong will send blue clocks down, that when collected, it adds 30 seconds to the time remaining. Starting with the fourth floor, there will be steamed clocks that removes 30 seconds from the timer if collected. If the player runs out of time or all six Mini-Marios are destroyed, the player will lose a life and must restart the battle. There is also an "O" card in the Donkey Kong stages.

The game featured a level editor called the Construction Zone in which players could select the types and locations of power-ups, enemies, and traps in custom-made levels. More items were added, and more characters were unlocked as the players progressed through the main game. Players could either play them locally or share them with friends on other Nintendo DSi devices via a wireless Internet connection. Changes to the level editor were made such as increasing the number of levels one could create from only 8 stages in March of the Minis to 140 stages in Minis March Again. Also, unlike March of the Minis, created and downloaded levels used the same counter; there could be only 140 levels between the 2 types. All online features were retired in May 2014.

== Story ==
Mario and Pauline are selling Mini-Mario toys. There is a long line. At the end of the line is Donkey Kong. As the line moves along, Donkey Kong finally ends up in the front. Just then, the Mini-Mario toys run out. In rage, Donkey Kong snatches Pauline from Mario. As Mario trips and tears Pauline's dress in pursuit of them, he sees the Mini Mario toys standing before him. Thus, Mario gets the idea of using them to catch Donkey Kong. After the credits, a secret ending appears. When Mario defeats Donkey Kong, he finds Pauline near a window, Donkey Kong turns out the lights, grabs Pauline again, and jumps out the window with her. Now Mario must play the Plus Floors to get Pauline back. After Mario plays all the Plus Floors and gets Pauline back he discovers that Donkey Kong was actually helping Mario by testing the minis.

== Development ==
Minis March Again! was announced during E3 2009.

== Reception ==
Reception

Aggregate score
Aggregator	Score
Metacritic	82/100

Review scores
Publication	Score
1Up.com	B+
Edge	7/10
IGN	8.6/10
Nintendo Life	8/10
Nintendo World Report	9/10
Official Nintendo Magazine	88%

The game received "favorable" reviews according to video game review aggregator platform Metacritic. IGN ranked it as the 14th best DSiWare game, praising it for helping them become less disillusioned with the service after many of its titles proved to be rehashes of retail Nintendo DS games. They also praised it for being significantly more customizable than its predecessor.
