= Donkey Kong 3 =

1983 video game

- European arcade flyer
- Developer: Nintendo R&D1
- Publisher: Nintendo
- Director: Shigeru Miyamoto
- Producer: Gunpei Yokoi
- Designer: Shigeru Miyamoto
- Composer: Hirokazu Tanaka
- Series: Donkey Kong
- Platforms: Arcade, NES, Game & Watch, Nintendo e-Reader
- Release: October 1983: Arcade; JP/NA: October 1983; EU: 1983; NES; JP: July 4, 1984; NA: June 1986; e-Reader; NA: April 21, 2003
- Genre: Shoot 'em up
- Modes: Single-player, multiplayer

Donkey Kong 3 (Note: Japanese: ドンキーコング3, Hepburn: Donkī Kongu Surī) is a 1983 shoot 'em up video game developed and published by Nintendo for arcades. It is the third installment in the Donkey Kong series, following 1982's Donkey Kong Jr. It was ported to the Family Computer in 1984, then in North America for the Nintendo Entertainment System in 1986. The gameplay departs from previous Donkey Kong games, and it stars an exterminator named Stanley instead of Mario. The game was a modest financial success in Japan, but its commercial failure in the United States was later cited by commentators as contributing to a period of reduced activity for the series until the release of Donkey Kong and Donkey Kong Country (both 1994).

It was re-released on the Wii Virtual Console in North America on July 14, 2008, and in Europe on January 9, 2009. It was later re-released on the Nintendo 3DS and Wii U's Virtual Console and Nintendo Switch through the Nintendo Classics service.

== Gameplay ==
Arcade screenshot

Donkey Kong hangs from vines at the center of the screen, and the player-controlled Stanley the exterminator runs and jumps on platforms beneath him. Stanley can fire bug spray at both Donkey Kong and insects flying around the levels. A level is completed by continually using his sprayer on Donkey Kong, forcing him to the top of the screen, or by killing all of the bugs. A Super Sprayer can on the vines falls down when Donkey Kong is sprayed past it. The Super Sprayer only lasts for a limited amount of time, but it pushes Donkey Kong upward at a much faster rate, making it easier to complete the level. It only spawns at the start of each life.

The insects consist of Buzzbees, queen Beespies (which shatter into deadly pieces when destroyed), inchworms, attacker bees, Kabutomushi beetles, and butterflies. Some of the flying insects attempt to pick up the flowers at the bottom of the screen and carry them away. Lost flowers decrease the bonus at the end of the round.

There are three levels which repeat in a fixed sequence. An extra life is given at 50,000 points, and then the game goes to "survival of the fittest" mode thereafter.

== Reception ==
Donkey Kong 3 was moderately successful in Japan, where it was listed by Game Machine as the fourth most successful table arcade unit of November 1983. However, it was a commercial failure in North America.

Contemporary reviews for the arcade game were generally positive. Gene Lewin of Play Meter magazine rated it 8 out of 10. Computer and Video Games said that the game's "fast action and superior sound effects" made it a "sure hit" in arcades.

Retrospectively, reception has been divisive, with criticism aimed at its stylistic departure from its predecessors and the absence of Mario. IGN gave the Virtual Console version a 6.0 out of 10, describing it as a "radical departure" from the previous Donkey Kong games and calling it "repetitive".

In 2015, Nathan Birch of Uproxx ranked Donkey Kong 3 twentieth on a list of the thirty NES black box titles. Birch called the game "fun enough" but criticized the gameplay as "simple, not-terribly-challenging arcade action", which he felt deviated too far from the gameplay of the game's predecessors. Because of its change to the genre, he thought that the game "killed" the series until its comeback with Donkey Kong Country.

== Legacy ==
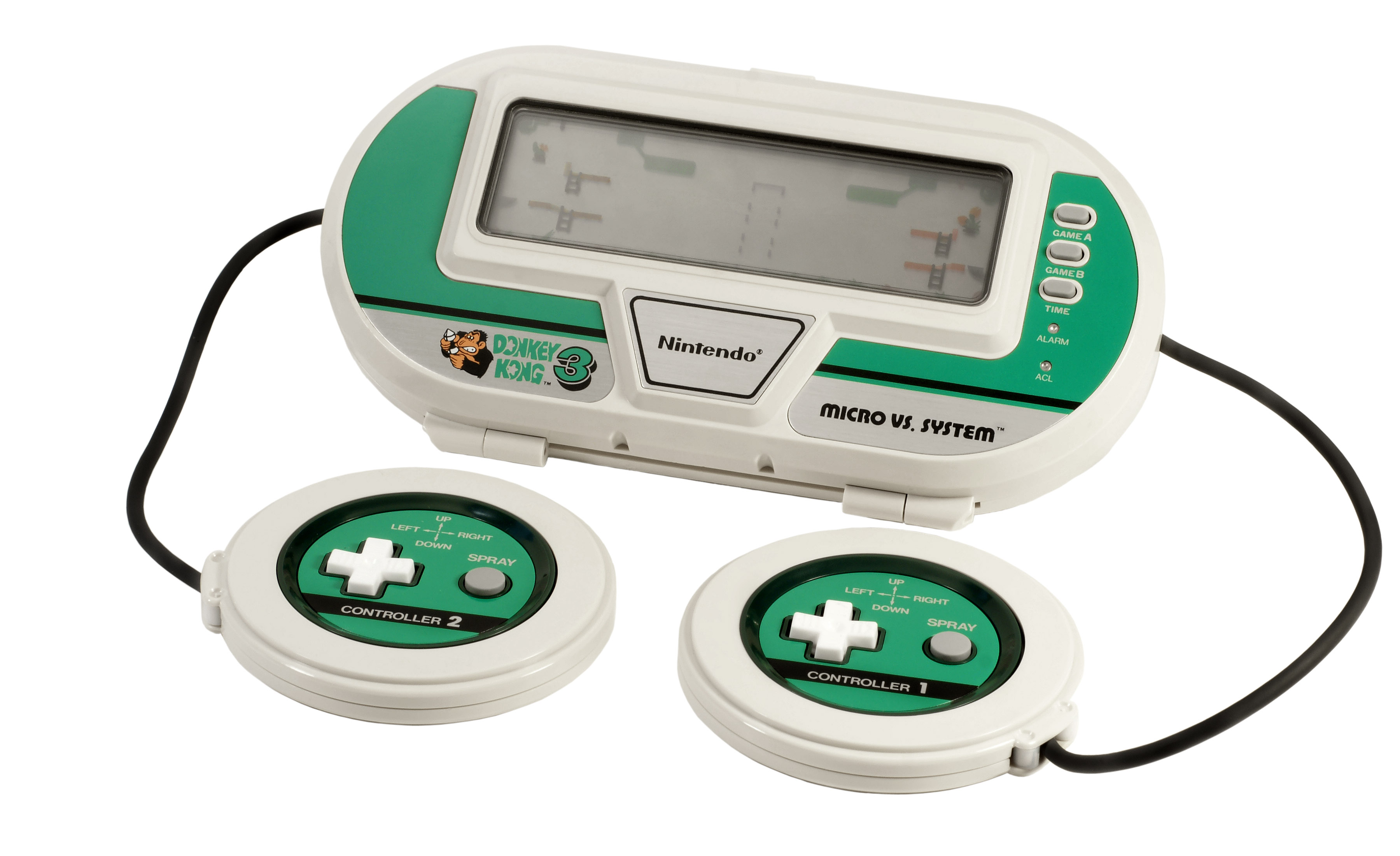
Game & Watch Donkey Kong 3

The Donkey Kong segment of Saturday Supercade would adapt the game in the episode "Greenhouse Gorilla", with Mario and Pauline assisting Stanley in dealing with a plant thief that has tricked Donkey Kong into helping him.

A VS. series Game & Watch version of the arcade game has different gameplay. In this version, player one controls Stanley the Bugman and computer player (or player two) controls Donkey Kong in a duel against each other using exterminating spray cans to move the bees to the other side of them to make the bees sting their opponents. Players can only hold up to three amounts of spraying liquid in their spray cans. On one player mode, the higher player one as Stanley scores, the faster the spraying liquid on the side of computer player as Donkey Kong drops. A version of this game was included in Game & Watch Gallery 4 for the Game Boy Advance, but with Mario in place of Stanley and a Boo and a Fireball in place of the bees.

The NES version of Donkey Kong 3 was released on the Virtual Console for the Wii, Nintendo 3DS, and Wii U, as well as the Nintendo Classics service. Hamster Corporation released the arcade version as part of their Arcade Archives series for the Nintendo Switch in 2019.

The current world record is held by George Riley (USA) at 3,538,000 points (2011).

=== Semi-sequel ===
In 1984, Hudson Soft developed a semi-sequel for the Japanese-only NEC PC-8801, NEC PC-6601, and Sharp X1 personal computers titled Donkey Kong 3: The Great Counterattack. (Note: Japanese: ドンキーコング3 大逆襲, Hepburn: Donkī Kongu Surī Dai Gyakushū) A version for the FM-7 was also planned, but was never released. This game is significantly different from the original. While the object to shoot Donkey Kong up in the air remains, it has 20 outdoor backgrounds such as a bridge, Planet Saturn, a desert, a pyramid, and a highway. Stanley can only move from left to right and is no longer able to jump.

For decades, Donkey Kong 3: The Great Counterattack was inaccessible outside of Japan. In December 2017, a copy of the Sharp X1 version was bought at a Yahoo! Auctions online auction. Two months later, it was made available via emulation. The PC-8801 version was subsequently uncovered in January 2019.
