= Mario vs. Donkey Kong: Mini-Land Mayhem! =

2010 video game

- North American box art
- Developer: Nintendo Software Technology
- Publisher: Nintendo
- Director: Yukimi Shimura
- Producers: Kensuke Tanabe; Shigeki Yamashiro
- Designers: Stephen Mortimer; Richard Vorodi
- Programmer: Rory Johnston
- Artist: Brian McNeely
- Writer: Wing S. Cho
- Composer: Lawrence Schwedler
- Series: Mario vs. Donkey Kong
- Platform: Nintendo DS
- Release: NA: November 14, 2010; JP/ROC: 2 December 2010; AU: 3 February 2011; EU: 4 February 2011; KR: 21 April 2011
- Genre: Puzzle-platform
- Mode: Single-player

Mario vs. Donkey Kong: Mini-Land Mayhem! is a 2010 puzzle-platform game developed by Nintendo Software Technology for the Nintendo DS. The game was released in North America on November 14, 2010 and is the fourth entry in the Mario vs. Donkey Kong series.

Mini-Land Mayhem! received generally favorable reviews from critics, who praised its gameplay and level editor with criticism towards its lack of originality. A sequel, titled Mario and Donkey Kong: Minis on the Move, was released in 2013 for the Nintendo 3DS.

== Gameplay ==
Mario vs. Donkey Kong: Mini-Land Mayhem! is a platform game with a 2D level design. Similar to the old Lemmings games, the puzzle-based gameplay in Mini-Land Mayhem is built upon that of the two earlier Mario vs. Donkey Kong titles, where players do not control Mario, but instead are tasked with guiding wind-up miniatures to level exits, in this case mechanical Mini-Mario toys. The game requires players to "build and rebuild levels on the fly", to allow the small miniature Marios to get from point A to point B. As the mini-Marios cannot be directly controlled, the player instead uses a stylus to manipulate their movements. Each level has one to three minis that must be moved, and it is necessary to rescue all the minis to clear a level, and each exit closes several seconds after a mini enters. If a mini falls onto spikes, traps, pitfalls, run into enemies, falls from a height of ten blocks or more, or the timer runs out, the player gets a game over and can either restart or exit the level. Once a single mini has reached the door, a timer comes on, and everyone else must be through the door within about six seconds, otherwise, the door will lock up, leaving out any other mini toys behind and it is Game Over. Similar to Mario vs. Donkey Kong: Minis March Again!, it is not possible to stop the miniatures or change their direction once they are activated.

There are eight themed "worlds" in the theme park, with eight levels each leading to boss battles. A zoomed-out map view on the upper screen helps players navigate worlds. Each world has a different type of object to interact with. The first world involves building walls and floors, using red girders to serve as bridges, walls, and ramps. Later players gain access to magnets, conveyor belts, and springs, as well as other building blocks for directing the robot army such as trampolines and repositioned platforms. Each world requires the player to use that world's specific tool to defeat Donkey Kong in the boss battle. For example, in one level, platforms can be built so the Mini-Marios can get to Donkey Kong to electrocute him or drop bombs on him. There is a time limit of 300 seconds and the player has six mini Marios to start with, just like the previous game. To clear the fight, the Mini-Marios need to hit Donkey Kong with three different objects or stepping on three switches (six times in the final battle). If the player loses all their Mini Marios or runs out of time, the player receives a Game Over. If the player loses to Donkey Kong by losing all six Mini Marios, the circle shows Donkey Kong as he beats his chest and Pauline calls for Mario, while the "GAME OVER!" text appears on the bottom of the screen, and any Mini Marios that attacked Donkey Kong will freeze. If the player loses the battle by getting a time-up, the same thing happens, except the "TIME'S UP!" text appears on the bottom screen, but Donkey Kong will say his voice earlier, and Pauline calls for Mario afterwards. There are also items like hammers, which can hit Circus Kong and other gorilla robots out of the way.

There are multiple solutions to many of the levels, although there are rewards for creating the optimum route. There are over 200 levels, and players are awarded trophies and medals for speed runs and gathering collectibles. Overall, the players can collect coins, M-tokens, and Mario Cards. There are also unlockable mini-games. In the plus mode, the levels are slightly harder, as the minis must be brought in the right order as shown at the beginning of the level. If a mini goes in the door in the wrong order, an X is displayed on the mini toy that went in the player's own exit order, resulting in a Game Over.

=== Modes ===
Once the Normal Mode of the game is beaten, there is an added Plus Mode in the game, where players can go through the stages again, but with the added difficulty of ushering minis through exits in specific orders. Afterwards, the Special and Expert Levels can be unlocked. Both Special and Expert Levels unlock ten more stages each. Trophies and medals for speed runs and gathering collectibles unlocks challenge modes. Trophies are required to unlock the Expert Levels.

=== Construction Zone ===
The game originally allowed players to build their own levels, with the Construction Zone level editor. Players could then share levels with other players using an online connection via Nintendo WiFi Connection, with the game able to store up to 160 additional puzzles. It was similar to the editor available in Mario vs. Donkey Kong: Minis March Again! but allowed the use of all the elements present in the game. After tools are unlocked in the single-player, those tools could be used in the multi-player world-building. All online features were retired in May 2014.

== Plot ==
Mini-Land is having its grand opening, and the first 100 customers get a free Mini-Pauline. Donkey Kong cuts in line to get one, only to find that he was the 101st customer. Angered, Donkey Kong kidnaps the real Pauline, and Mario uses the Minis to follow him through a number of attractions. He eventually defeats Donkey Kong at the "Final Ferris Wheel", but Donkey Kong kidnaps Pauline again. Mario follows him through the Plus Attractions and defeats him at the Final Ferris Wheel yet again, but then makes up for Donkey Kong's remorse by bending the rules and giving him a Mini Pauline after all. Mario, Pauline, and Donkey Kong then ride the Ferris wheel as the Toads celebrate the end of the conflict between Mario and Donkey Kong.

== Development ==
Mini-Land Mayhem was developed by Nintendo Software Technology. Music in the game was described as "a hopped-up circus sounding Mario soundtrack", with Mario classics tweaked to a carnival setting. Yukimi Shimura directed, Kensuke Tanabe produced, and Lawrence Schwedler composed.

== Reception ==
Reception

Aggregate score
Aggregator	Score
Metacritic	79/100

Review scores
Publication	Score
Destructoid	7.5/10
Edge	7/10
Eurogamer	8/10
Famitsu	32/40
Game Informer	8.25/10
GamePro	3/5
GameRevolution	B+
GameSpot	8/10
GameTrailers	7.9/10
GameZone	7.5/10
IGN	9/10
Joystiq	4/5
Nintendo Power	7.5/10
The Daily Telegraph	8/10
Metro	8/10

Mini-Land Mayhem received "generally favorable" reviews according to video game review aggregator Metacritic. New York Post gave it an A rating. New York Daily News was positive to the game. The Guardian gave it four stars out of five and praised the level design. Metro called a game "a relatively small improvement" compared to other games in the series, but named it as one of the best puzzle games for DS. In Japan, Famitsu gave it a score of all 4 eights, for a total of 32 out of 40.

The Daily Telegraph expressed that although it was similar to Lemmings, the overall game boasted "surprising depth", in addition to its "clever" level design and easy, intuitive controls. IGN thought the game wasn't very hard, but did say it was "pure joy" to play, and adorable as well. Engadget liked that the game's interface was "simple and intuitive", with the game doing well at interpreting stylus movements, but also said the Mini Marios did not handle cylindrical surfaces well, which was the "sole flaw" in the game. The review especially liked the Construction Zone, which is said was "shockingly" easy to get started on. Also, Eurogamer said that "tinkering with each stage's geometry is both mentally taxing and genuinely thrilling".
