= Donkey Kong (1994 video game) =

1994 video game

- North American box art
- Developers: Nintendo; Pax Softnica
- Publisher: Nintendo
- Directors: Masayuki Kameyama; Takao Shimizu
- Producer: Shigeru Miyamoto
- Programmers: Yoshiaki Hoshino; Masayuki Hirashima
- Artists: Hideo Kon; Kenta Usui; Takaya Imamura
- Composer: Taisuke Araki
- Series: Donkey Kong
- Platform: Game Boy
- Release: JP: June 14, 1994; NA: June 1994; EU: September 1994
- Genre: Puzzle-platform
- Mode: Single-player

Donkey Kong, (Note: Japanese: ドンキーコング, Hepburn: Donkī Kongu) commonly referred to as Donkey Kong '94, is a 1994 puzzle-platform game developed by Nintendo and Pax Softnica for the Game Boy. The player controls the Italian plumber Mario, who must rescue his girlfriend Pauline from the gorilla Donkey Kong. It begins as a remake of the Donkey Kong (1981) arcade game before introducing 97 original levels, incorporating game mechanics from Donkey Kong Jr. (1982) and Super Mario Bros. 2 (1988), in which the player must locate a key to proceed.

The Donkey Kong franchise creator Shigeru Miyamoto led the development, which ended a decade-long hiatus after the unsuccessful Donkey Kong 3 (1983). The developers sought to reimagine the original game while maintaining the theme of Mario attempting to outwit the trickster Donkey Kong. They gave Mario many new abilities while focusing on puzzle-oriented gameplay to account for the Game Boy's small display. Donkey Kong was the last game developed before Miyamoto shifted to an advisory role on the franchise.

Donkey Kong was released in Japan and North America in June 1994, and in Europe in September. It was the first Game Boy game designed for the Super Game Boy, a Super Nintendo Entertainment System (SNES) peripheral that allows users to play Game Boy games on a television. Donkey Kong sold 3.07 million copies, making it one of the bestselling Game Boy games, and received positive reviews. Critics considered it a killer app for the Super Game Boy and praised its gameplay, controls, challenge, and sound.

Although successful, Donkey Kong's release was overshadowed by the SNES game Donkey Kong Country later in 1994, and it was the last Donkey Kong developed internally until Donkey Kong Jungle Beat (2004). In retrospect, video game journalists regard Donkey Kong as one of the best Game Boy and Donkey Kong games. It was rereleased for the Nintendo 3DS in 2011, and for the Nintendo Switch in 2025. Nintendo released a sequel, Mario vs. Donkey Kong, for the Game Boy Advance in 2004.

== Gameplay ==
Mario carries a key while jumping across platforms.

Donkey Kong is a puzzle-platform game. The journalist Jeremy Parish described it as partly a remake of and partly a sequel to the original Donkey Kong (1981) arcade game; it also incorporates elements from Donkey Kong Jr. (1982). The player controls the Italian plumber Mario, who seeks to rescue his girlfriend Pauline from the gorilla Donkey Kong. It begins with the original Donkey Kong's four levels, with Mario climbing a construction site while avoiding obstacles. During the ending sequence, Donkey Kong returns to recapture Pauline and Mario pursues him. The player is then presented with 97 additional levels spanning nine worlds, for a total of 101 levels.

The player jumps to cross platforms and avoid obstacles, and collects a hammer power-up to destroy enemies. Donkey Kong expands Mario's moveset; for instance, he can now throw the hammer upwards to continue using it on another platform. Mario can perform a backflip to jump higher, a handstand to triple jump, and spin on wires to throw himself. Similar to Super Mario Bros. 2 (1988), he can pick up and throw objects and enemies. While the player must avoid touching enemies, they can stand on some to use them as platforms. Some areas feature climbing and swimming sections. The player begins with limited lives and losing them all results in a game over. Unlike the original Donkey Kong, in which falling from any height can kill Mario, falling is only fatal if Mario lands on his head; otherwise, he is briefly stunned.

The player accesses levels from a world map. They traverse a side-scrolling area, no larger than 1.5 × the Game Boy screen, to locate a key, which they must carry to a locked door within a time limit. The levels contain three collectibles (a hat, a parasol, and a purse); collecting all sends the player to an end-of-level minigame for extra lives. Some levels contain blocks that allow the player to add bridges, ladders, and springs, while others require them to turn switches to operate mechanisms like elevators, and Donkey Kong Jr. appears in later levels. Every fourth level is a boss encounter in which the player must avoid obstacles to reach Pauline, similar to the original game, or throw barrels at Donkey Kong. Cutscenes after boss encounters depict abilities the player will use to clear upcoming levels, after which the player saves their progress. Up to three save files can be stored per cartridge.

== Development ==
=== Conception ===
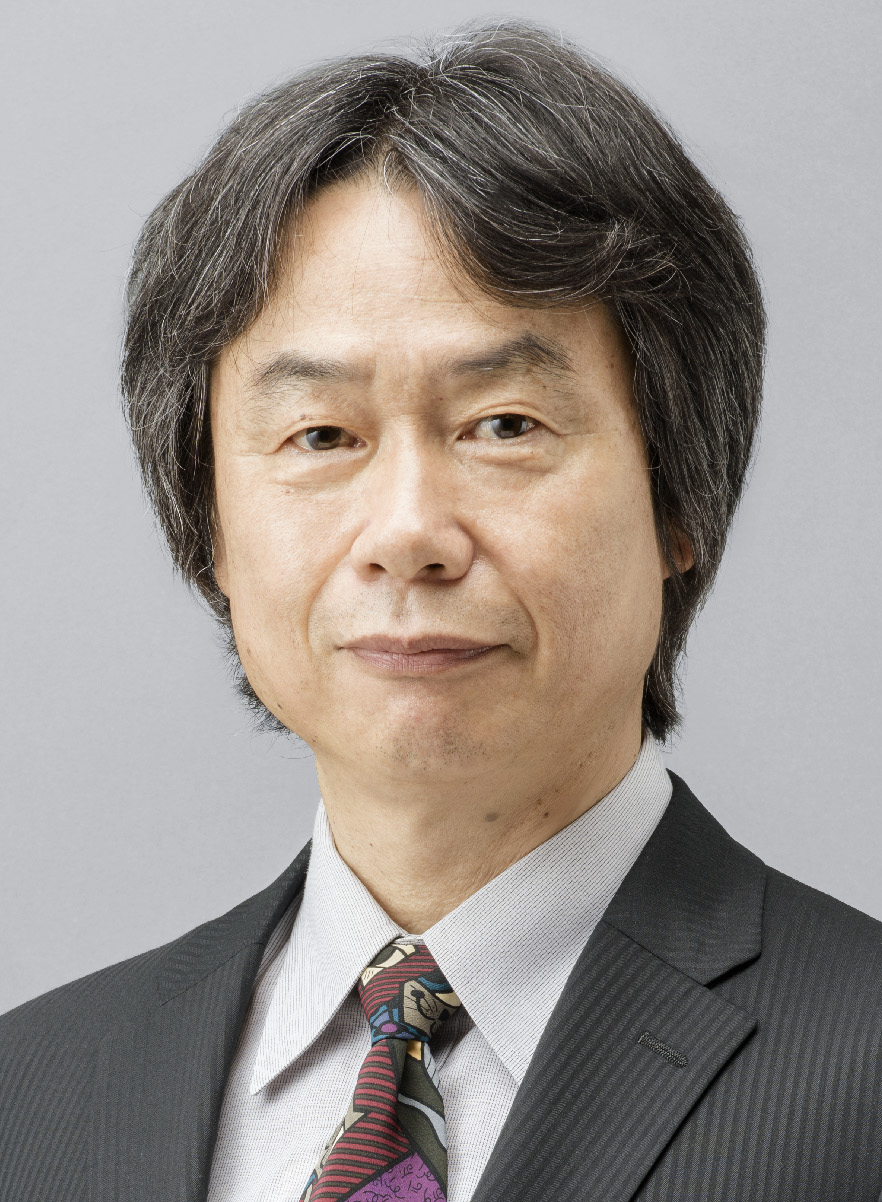
Donkey Kong's creator Shigeru Miyamoto (pictured in 2015) led the development.

Donkey Kong was the first original Donkey Kong game in over a decade, concluding a hiatus that began after the failure of Donkey Kong 3 (1983). Nintendo began holding discussions regarding a revival before the franchise's tenth anniversary in 1991. Its creator Shigeru Miyamoto, who produced Donkey Kong, said the concept was not to remake the original but to develop a new game that reimagined it. They were unable to start Donkey Kong immediately, so they included Donkey Kong Jr. as a playable character in Super Mario Kart (1992) before development began.

Nintendo Information Development Department and Pax Softnica, a Japan-based studio that assisted Nintendo and the Kirby developer HAL Laboratory in the 1990s, developed Donkey Kong. Nintendo developers included the director Takao Shimizu, who previously directed Kirby games, and the graphic designers Takaya Imamura and Kenta Usui. Pax Softnica developers included the graphic designer Hideo Kon and the programmers Masayuki Kameyama, Yoshiaki Hoshino, and Masayuki Hirashima. Kameyama managed coordination between Nintendo and Pax Softnica.

Donkey Kong was developed alongside Rare's Super Nintendo Entertainment System (SNES) game Donkey Kong Country (1994), which rebooted the franchise with pre-rendered 3D graphics. It was the last Donkey Kong game that Miyamoto was directly involved with, as he shifted to an advisory role with Donkey Kong Country. Parish wrote that it was unclear if Donkey Kong was intended as a Game Boy companion to Donkey Kong Country or Miyamoto's effort "to make one final statement with his first great work before the character irrevocably transformed in the public eye".

=== Design ===
The team sought to maintain the original theme of Mario attempting to outwit Donkey Kong, a trickster. Miyamoto said they had the story "play[] out over and over ― Donkey Kong running away, the player chasing after them, running, chasing". Donkey Kong opens with the arcade game's four levels, as the team determined that many players would be purchasing it out of nostalgia. Some staff worried that featuring the levels prominently would create the impression Donkey Kong was simply a port, so they considered placing them at the end as a postgame bonus. The stages underwent adjustments to accommodate the Game Boy's small display, such as the opening level featuring four girders instead of six.

The team designed Donkey Kong to appeal to younger players who had been introduced to the Game Boy with Kirby as well as older ones who played the original arcade game. They opted for a puzzle-oriented direction due to the small display, which made it difficult to keep track of characters. Miyamoto noted that, compared to the Super Mario series, Donkey Kong's levels required gamers to play more precisely. He said they "adopt[ed] a high-density style of gameplay" to "make the most out of such small stages... The player has to really learn every little detail." Early builds included a level editor created by Hirashima, so the designers could work on levels from a handheld console. It was excluded from the retail release because it was too difficult for children to understand, but the team incorporated its functionality in some levels via items that allow players to place platforms and ladders. Usui, who initially worked on the graphics, shifted to designing the levels during the latter half of the development. He designed most of them outside work, such as during commutes or in the bathroom.

Hoshino programmed Mario's movement and the enemies. Miyamoto gave Mario as many abilities as possible; he wanted simply moving him to be fun and his abilities easy to execute, in contrast to games with varied character abilities such as Street Fighter II (1991). The developers initially planned to unlock Mario's moves as the player defeated bosses, but Miyamoto argued this was unfair to players who could not complete the game. Miyamoto and Kameyama noted Mario's new abilities allow the player to complete the arcade levels—designed to be difficult to maximize profit—in a matter of seconds. Whereas the arcade game's time limit was included simply to end a session if a player abandoned the cabinet, Donkey Kong incorporates it as an active game mechanic, which Miyamoto said added a time attack element.

The Nintendo artist Yōichi Kotabe provided illustrations. Donkey Kong was the first game to depict Donkey Kong wearing a red tie bearing his initials, which Miyamoto had suggested for the Donkey Kong Country redesign to better convey his stubbornness. The story takes place before Super Mario Bros. (1985), and the team determined that ending it in Donkey Kong's homeland would be fitting; the Super Mario series' Mushroom Kingdom setting is visible in the background during the ending. Additional bosses, such as Momogaa, a giant flying squirrel that darted across the screen, were cut to avoid diminishing Donkey Kong's presence. One level features an octopus enemy; it originally appeared in several levels, but the developers reduced its presence after playtesters complained it made the game too difficult.

=== Graphics and sound ===
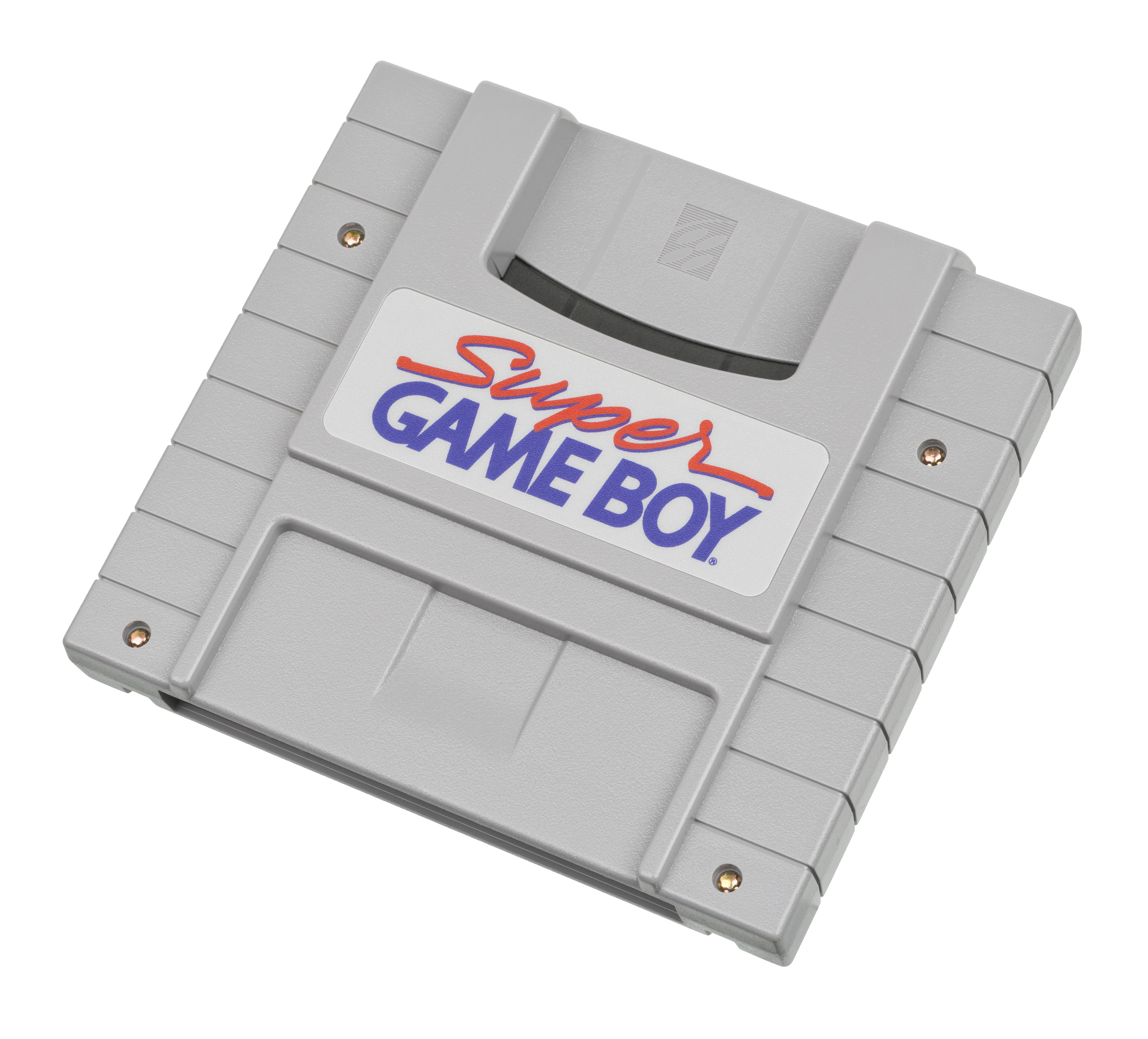
Donkey Kong was the first game designed for the Super Game Boy, which allowed for enhanced visuals and audio.

Donkey Kong was the first game developed for use with the Super Game Boy, a SNES peripheral that allows users to play Game Boy games on their television. While the Game Boy can only display four colors, the Super Game Boy can display up to 13. Due to the Game Boy's small resolution, games are displayed with a graphical border on the Super Game Boy; Donkey Kong features a border based on the original game's arcade cabinet. Imamura worked on the in-game color palettes and the border graphics, and said it was difficult to draw graphics that would look good on both the Game Boy and a television screen. Selecting suitable palettes for each level took considerable time.

Kon, who oversaw the animation and character art, drew Mario and the enemies' sprites. The designers included as many damage animations as possible, which Miyamoto said was inspired by Mario Bros. (1983) having a unique animation for when Mario touches fire. The soundtrack was composed by Taisuke Araki. It features over 40 tracks, a large soundtrack for a Game Boy game. On the Super Game Boy, Donkey Kong takes advantage of the SNES's differential pulse-code modulation (DPCM) samples. This leads to a different voice sample for Pauline's cry and the ending credits music using sounds not available on the Game Boy.

== Release ==
Nintendo promoted Donkey Kong with preview coverage in its Nintendo Power magazine, and partnered with Nelsonic to release a tie-in LCD watch. Donkey Kong was released in Japan on June 14, 1994, in North America in June 1994, and in Europe in September 1994. It is often referred to as Donkey Kong '94 to distinguish it from the 1981 game. Donkey Kong quickly became a bestseller for the Game Boy; in the UK, it was the bestselling Game Boy game between October and November 1994. It sold 3.07 million copies worldwide.

== Reception ==
Reception

Review scores
Publication	Score
Electronic Gaming Monthly	9/10, 8/10, 8/10, 8/10
Famitsu	7/10, 6/10, 7/10, 7/10
Game Informer	8/10
Game Players	93%
Hyper	85/100
Total!	92%
VideoGames & Computer Entertainment	8/10, 9/10, 9/10, 9/10

Awards
Publication	Award
Electronic Gaming Monthly	Game of the Month, Game Boy Game of the Year
Video Games: The Ultimate Gaming Magazine	Best Game Boy Game

Donkey Kong received positive reviews from critics, who considered it a solid revival of the long-dormant franchise. (Note: Attributed to multiple references: EGM, Game Players, GamePro, Total!, and Video Games) Total! called it "one of the best platform games ever made, and a worthy sequel to the original Donkey Kong". GamePro said it demonstrated Donkey Kong's continued relevance and would appeal to older players for the sense of nostalgia and newer players who would "develop a certain simian savoir-faire" as they played. Hyper did not typically review 8-bit games but made an exception for Donkey Kong partly on the basis of its high quality. Electronic Gaming Monthly (EGM) and Video Games: The Ultimate Gaming Magazine named it the best Game Boy game of 1994.

Critics praised the gameplay as compelling and challenging. (Note: Attributed to multiple references: EGM, Game Informer GamePro, Game Players, and Video Games) Video Games called it addictive, Super Play favorably compared it to Miner 2049er (1982), and EGM and Hyper were impressed by the amount of content. EGM said it brought back the original game's best elements while introducing new ones, and Total! wrote that Nintendo successfully modernized the Donkey Kong gameplay. Many enjoyed the controls and movement, (Note: Attributed to multiple references: EGM, Game Players, GamePro, Hyper, and Video Games) which Game Players said were so refined that players could not blame the game for their mistakes. Famitsu's reviewers were less positive: one said the focus on puzzle-solving could disappoint players expecting the original Donkey Kong gameplay, and others felt the gameplay was too difficult with Mario's new abilities, which they found too complicated to execute within the time limit. While Game Players found Donkey Kong entertaining, they said it lost some appeal upon completion.

GamePro and Video Games said the visuals were good for a Game Boy game, with Video Games likening them to a Nintendo Entertainment System game. Hyper said the detail and atmosphere made up for the lack of color, with "cutesy characters" giving it a "vintage Nintendo feel". The Super Game Boy enhancements received acclaim; (Note: Attributed to multiple references: EGM, Game Informer, GamePro, and Video Games) EGM, GamePro, and Hyper described Donkey Kong as the Super Game Boy's killer app. Video Games said the Super Game Boy turned Donkey Kong into a masterpiece, and GamePro said it made the Super Game Boy an essential purchase. Game Players said that were it not for the 8-bit graphics, the animations and colors almost hid that Donkey Kong was a Game Boy game. They felt that Donkey Kong would have been better as a SNES game, suggesting it could have been a suitable companion to the upcoming Donkey Kong Country. EGM similarly said that the Game Boy hardware held Donkey Kong back.

Game Players, GamePro, Total!, and Video Games enjoyed the sound, which Game Players and GamePro described as nostalgic and recognizable, though Game Players said it could have benefitted from modernizing. EGM praised the music as cute, and GamePro said it was "fresh, funny, and a good addition". On the Super Game Boy, GamePro said the sound was better than the original game's, though Super Play did not notice many differences.

== Post-release ==
Donkey Kong was overshadowed by Donkey Kong Country, released later in 1994. Parish wrote that Donkey Kong Country's visuals made Donkey Kong seem outdated in comparison, compounded by the Game Boy hardware being regarded as obsolete. Rare developed the subsequent Game Boy Donkey Kong games—Donkey Kong Land (1995), Donkey Kong Land 2 (1996), and Donkey Kong Land III (1997)—which were based on the SNES Country games. According to Parish, Donkey Kong "languish[ed] in obscurity on a fading portable system as [the franchise] was visibly redefined by an outside studio's efforts mere months later".

Nintendo announced a remake, Donkey Kong Plus, for the Game Boy Advance (GBA) at E3 2002. In addition to updated visuals, it featured a game creation system: through the GameCube – GBA cable, players could open a level editor to create and test levels on a GameCube, and download them to play on a GBA. Donkey Kong Plus was scheduled for release in early 2003, but at E3 2003, it was reannounced as a sequel, Mario vs. Donkey Kong (2004), with the GameCube connectivity features removed. It features the Donkey Kong gameplay with new puzzles and pre-rendered graphics. Mario vs. Donkey Kong received positive reviews and was followed by sequels for the Nintendo DS, Nintendo 3DS, and Wii U.

=== Rereleases ===
Donkey Kong was rereleased under Player's Choice, a bestseller line introduced in 1996. Nintendo released an emulated Donkey Kong as a downloadable game for the Nintendo 3DS via the Virtual Console service on June 16, 2011, and for Nintendo Switch Online subscribers via the Nintendo Classics service on March 7, 2025. As the Virtual Console and Nintendo Classics emulators do not support the Super Game Boy, both rereleases exclude the SNES-based enhancements.

== Legacy ==
Donkey Kong was the last Donkey Kong game that Nintendo developed internally until Donkey Kong Jungle Beat (2004). Retrospective reviewers consider it one of the best Donkey Kong games, and one of the best Game Boy games.
