= GameCube accessories =

Video game console accessories

GameCube accessories are hardware that are compatible with the Nintendo GameCube home video game console, which first launched in 2001. Accessories can be either first-party releases from Nintendo or third-party devices from an outside manufacturer.

First-party accessories include the GameCube controller, the WaveBird Wireless Controller, audio/video cables, memory cards, link cables, network adapters, the Game Boy Player, a microphone, development tools, and carrying cases. Third-party companies such as Datel and Mad Catz produced their own versions of some first-party devices along with specialized accessories of their own.

== First-party and licensed ==
=== Controllers ===
==== GameCube controller ====
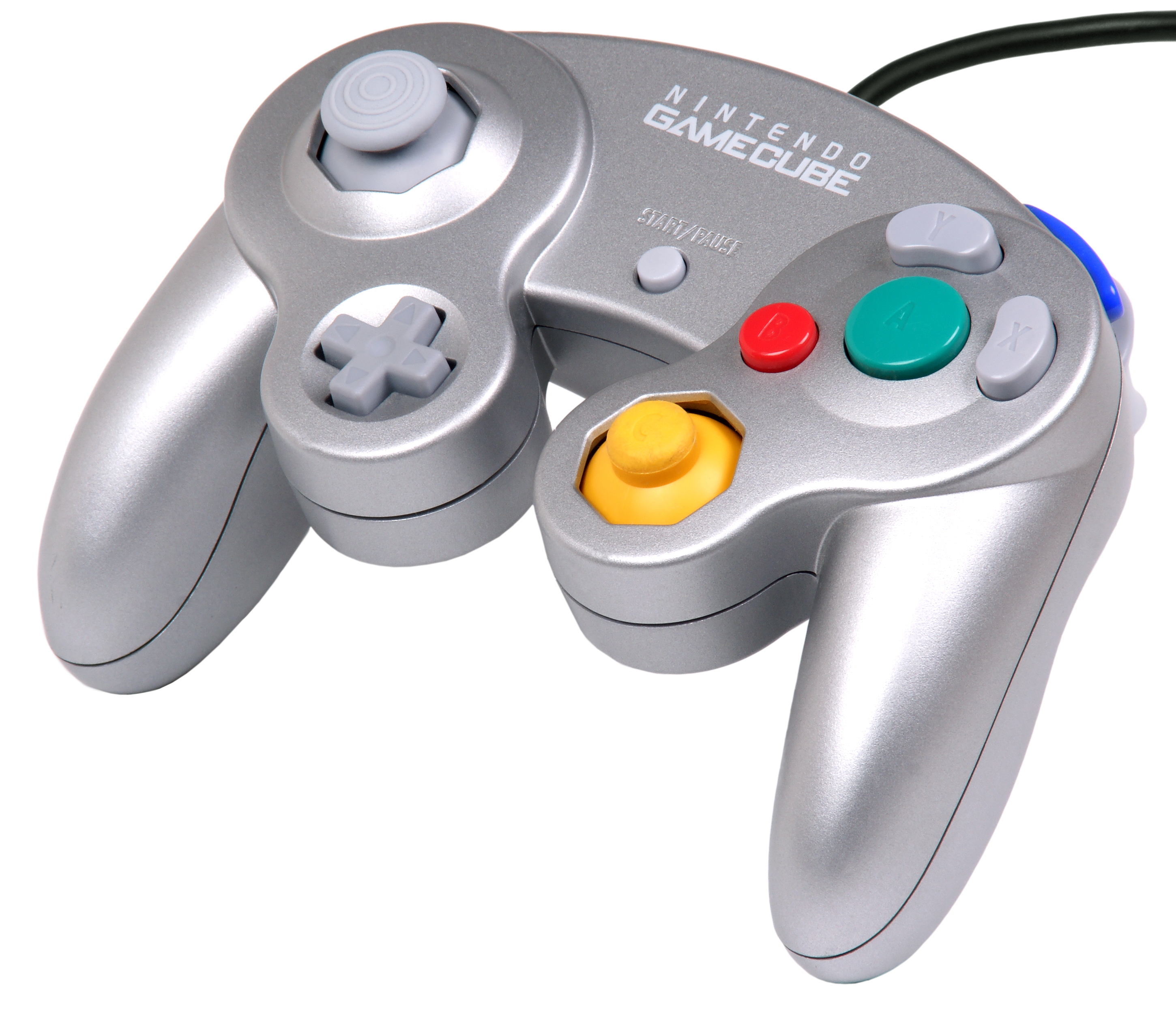
Platinum GameCube controller

The GameCube controller was released alongside the console and comes bundled with every unit. Standard colors include Indigo, Black, Spice (Orange), Emerald Blue (Turquoise, only available in Japan), Platinum, Indigo/Clear, and Pearl White (Only available in Europe). There are also limited edition controllers available such as a two-toned blue and red, with the Mario "M" emblem replacing the regular GameCube logo seen on standard controllers (There have also been green and navy blue Luigi "L" controllers and similarly yellow and purple Wario "W" controller). There are also specially colored controllers bundled with systems, such as the Mobile Suit Gundam Edition (Red/Dark Red), Symphonic Green Edition (Sea Green) and the Final Fantasy Crystal White Edition. The controller can also be used to play certain games on the Wii system and as a result in 2008 Nintendo issued a white GameCube controller (Japan only). This controller also features a white 3 m/10 ft long cable, rather than the standard 2 m/6.5 ft black cable.

In 2014, there was a re-release of the Standard GameCube controller coinciding with the release of Super Smash Bros. for Wii U. It was very limited and is the same as the original controller other than replacing the GameCube logo with the Super Smash Bros. logo instead. It was available in Black or White. A similar controller was released on November 2, 2018, to coincide with the release of Super Smash Bros. Ultimate for Nintendo Switch, featuring a simpler design of the Super Smash Bros. logo on it and was available only in Black. Both re-released controllers featured a longer 3 m/10 ft cable.

==== WaveBird Wireless Controller ====
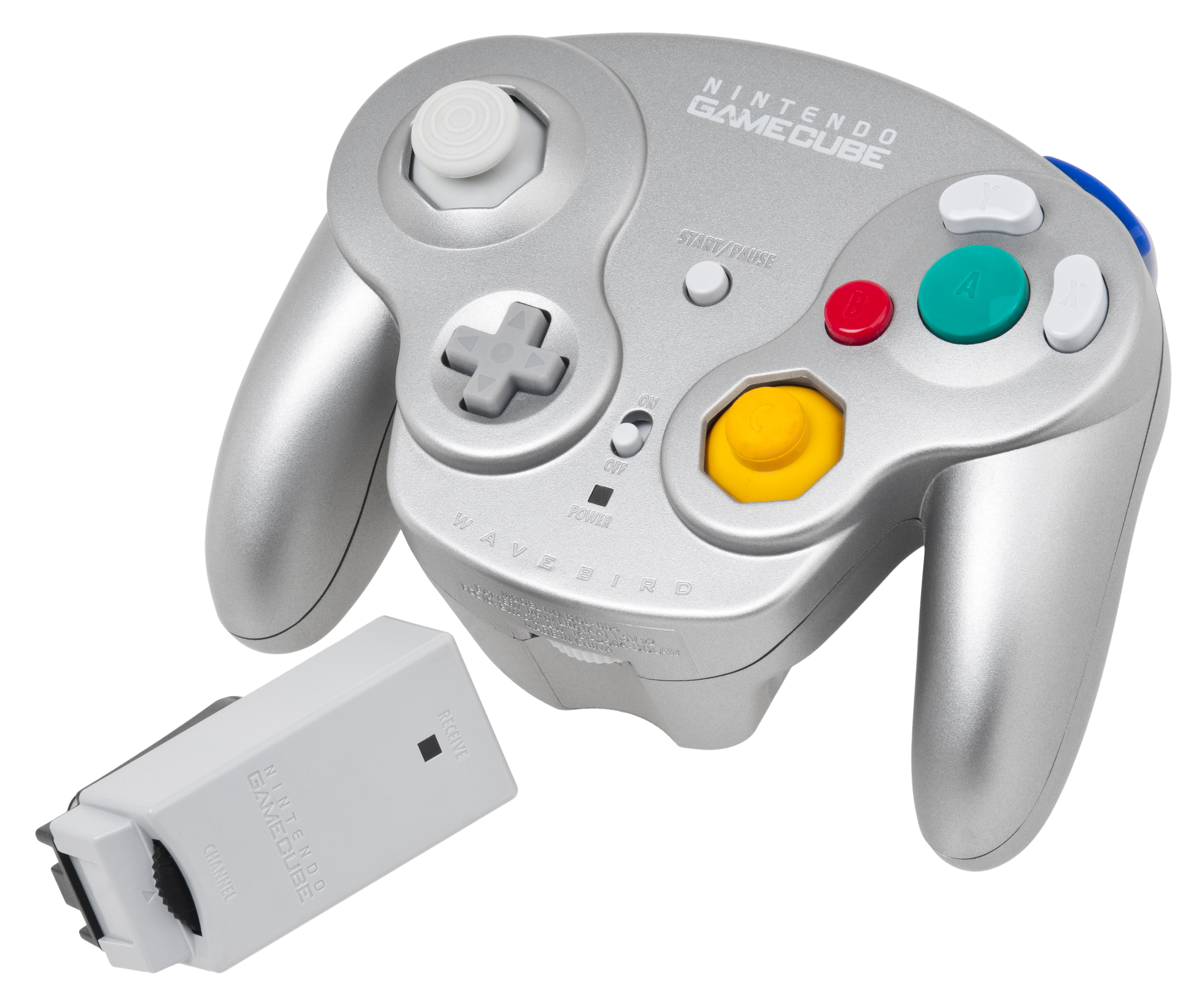
Platinum WaveBird controller and its receiver

The WaveBird Wireless Controller is an RF-based Wireless controller based on the same design as the standard controller. It communicates with the GameCube system wirelessly through a receiver dongle which connects to one of the system's controller ports. It is powered by two AA batteries. As a power-conservation measure, the WaveBird lacks the rumble function of the standard controller. The WaveBird controller was available in most regions only in light gray and platinum colors. In Japan two limited edition WaveBird models were released through Club Nintendo: 1,000 Special Edition Gundam "Char's Customized Color" WaveBirds (two-toned red with the Neo-Zeon logo) to coincide with the Japan-only GameCube release of Mobile Suit Gundam: Gundam vs. Z Gundam, and a "Club Nintendo" WaveBird (White top with light blue bottom and Club Nintendo logo)

==== DK Bongos ====
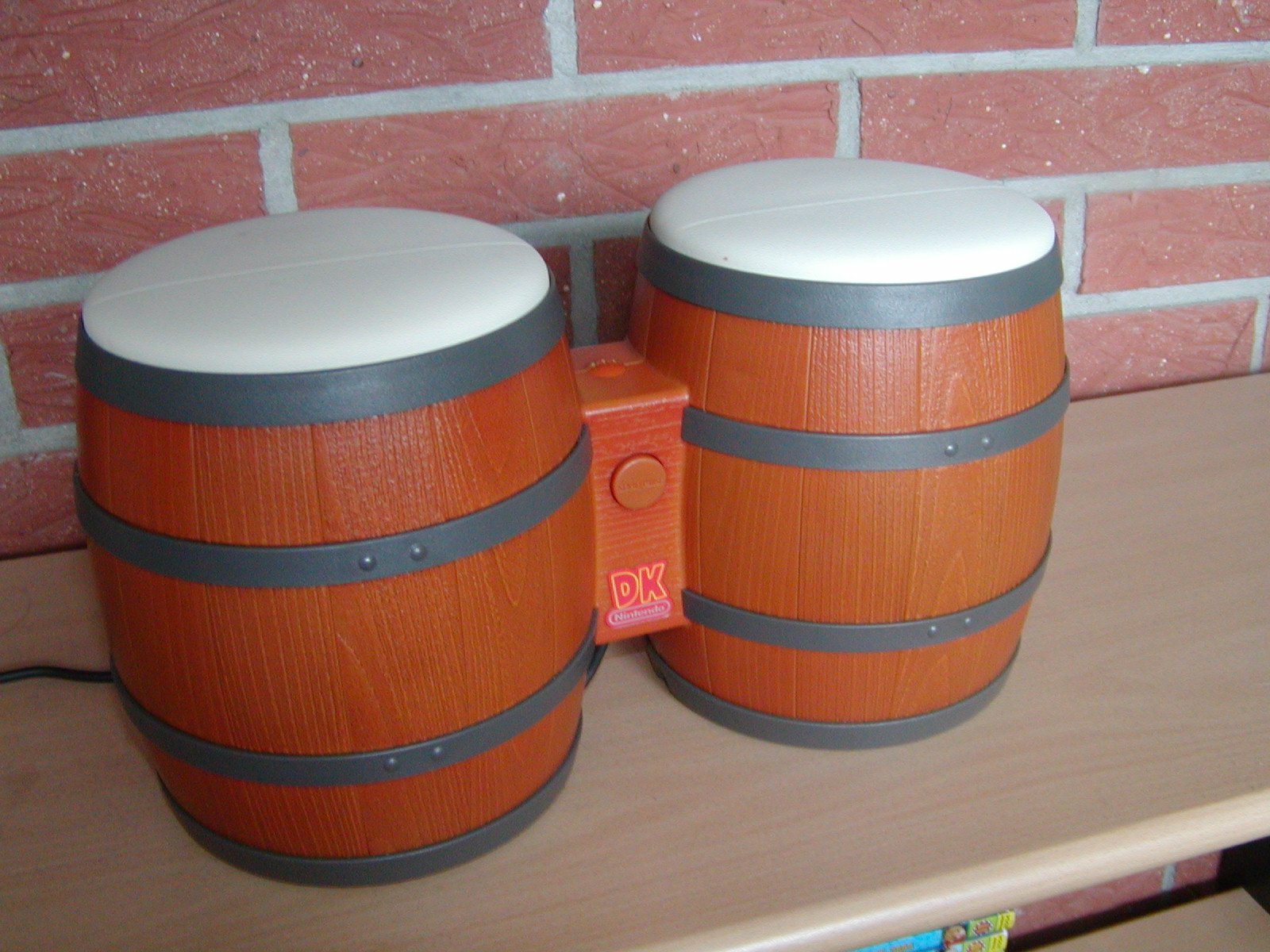
DK Bongos

DK Bongos (Japanese: タルコンガ, Hepburn: Tarukonga) were designed for use with the music games Donkey Konga, Donkey Konga 2, and Donkey Konga 3, and the platformer Donkey Kong Jungle Beat, all of which were packaged with DK Bongos. A racing game, DK Bongo Blast, was also set to use the peripheral, but the GameCube version was canceled, and the game eventually released on the Wii without Bongo support as Donkey Kong Barrel Blast. Players hit the controller like a pair of bongo drums. The controller has an analog sound-sensor module between the two drums to detect clapping.

Due to the uniqueness of the peripheral, the bongos were utilized by various games long after their release. They are compatible with the 2018 Taiko no Tatsujin: Drum 'n' Fun! via the GameCube Controller Adapter for Nintendo Switch. Several indie games were also designed around them, such as Beat Nebula (2016), Squatbot (2018), and Beat Bull (2022). They are commonly used in challenge runs as a non-standard control method, such as being used in 2020 to beat Sekiro: Shadows Die Twice.

==== Action Pad ====
The Action Pad was included with Dance Dance Revolution: Mario Mix, and resembles other dance mats made by developer Konami at the time. It has 4 directional arrows, as well as A, B, Z, and Start buttons.

==== Beat Pad ====
The Beat Pad was made by Mad Catz and officially licensed by Nintendo. It was included with the game MC Groovz Dance Craze and sold separately. It has 8 arrows.

==== ASCII keyboard controller ====
Diagram of the ASCII keyboard controller

The ASCII keyboard controller resembles a standard GameCube controller pad stretched to accommodate an alphanumeric keyboard in the center. The keyboard requires the use of two controller ports and contains both Latin and Japanese hiragana characters. It was developed for use with Phantasy Star Online Episode I & II.

==== Hori Game Boy Player Controller ====
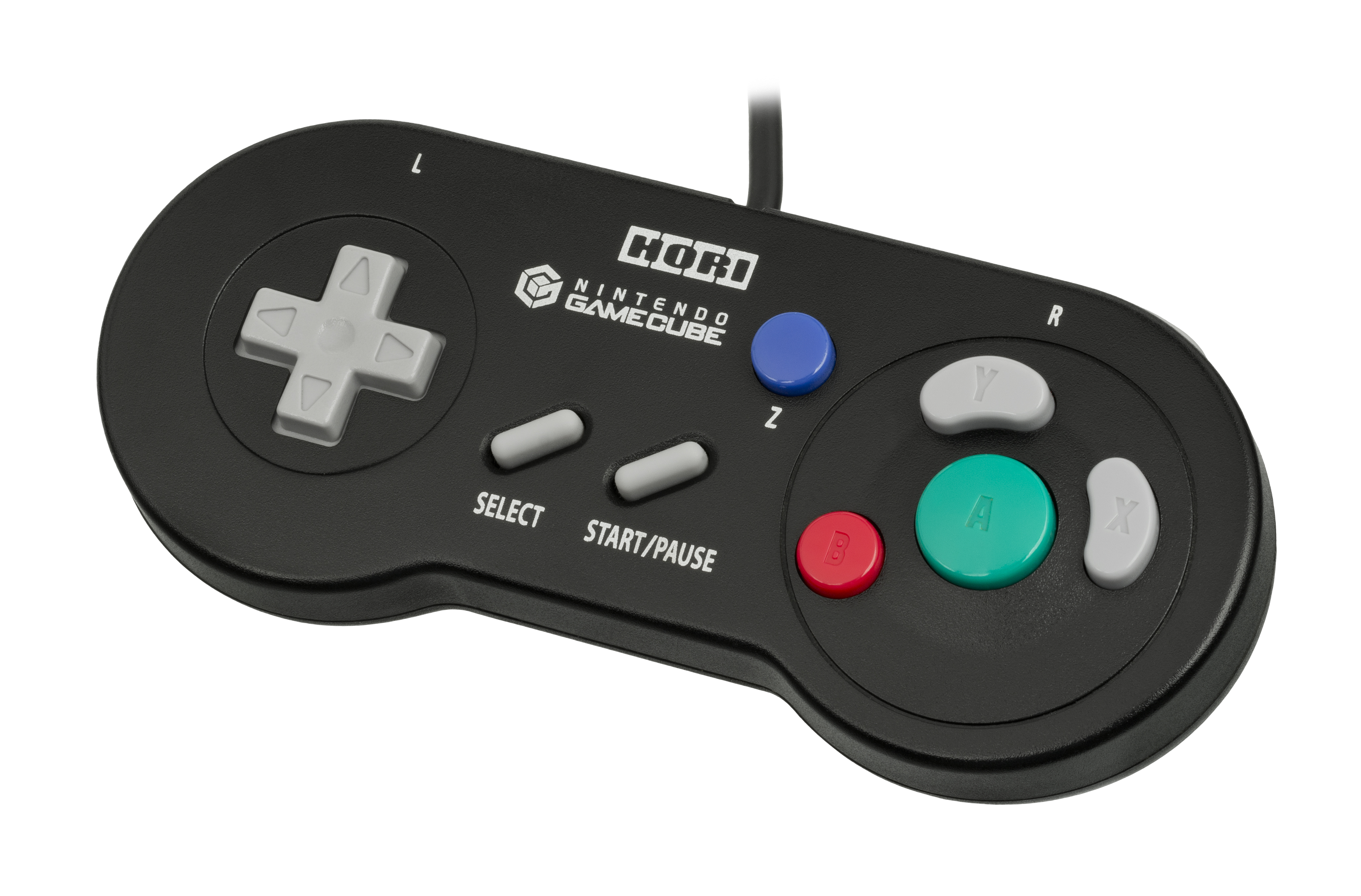
Game Boy Player controller

The Hori Game Boy Player Controller comes in the colors Indigo and Jet Black, in the shape of a SNES control pad. It does not include the Control Stick or C-Stick, and the L and R buttons lack a range of pressure sensitivity; thus, only uses the D-pad for movement and the usual buttons for playing. Although meant for the Game Boy Player, it can be used with certain 2D GameCube games, such as Alien Hominid, Capcom vs. SNK 2 EO, Mega Man Anniversary Collection, Sonic Mega Collection, Sonic Gems Collection, or a few 3D GameCube games that support D-pad movement, like Crash Bandicoot: The Wrath of Cortex and Mortal Kombat: Deadly Alliance.

==== Hori Fighting Stick ====
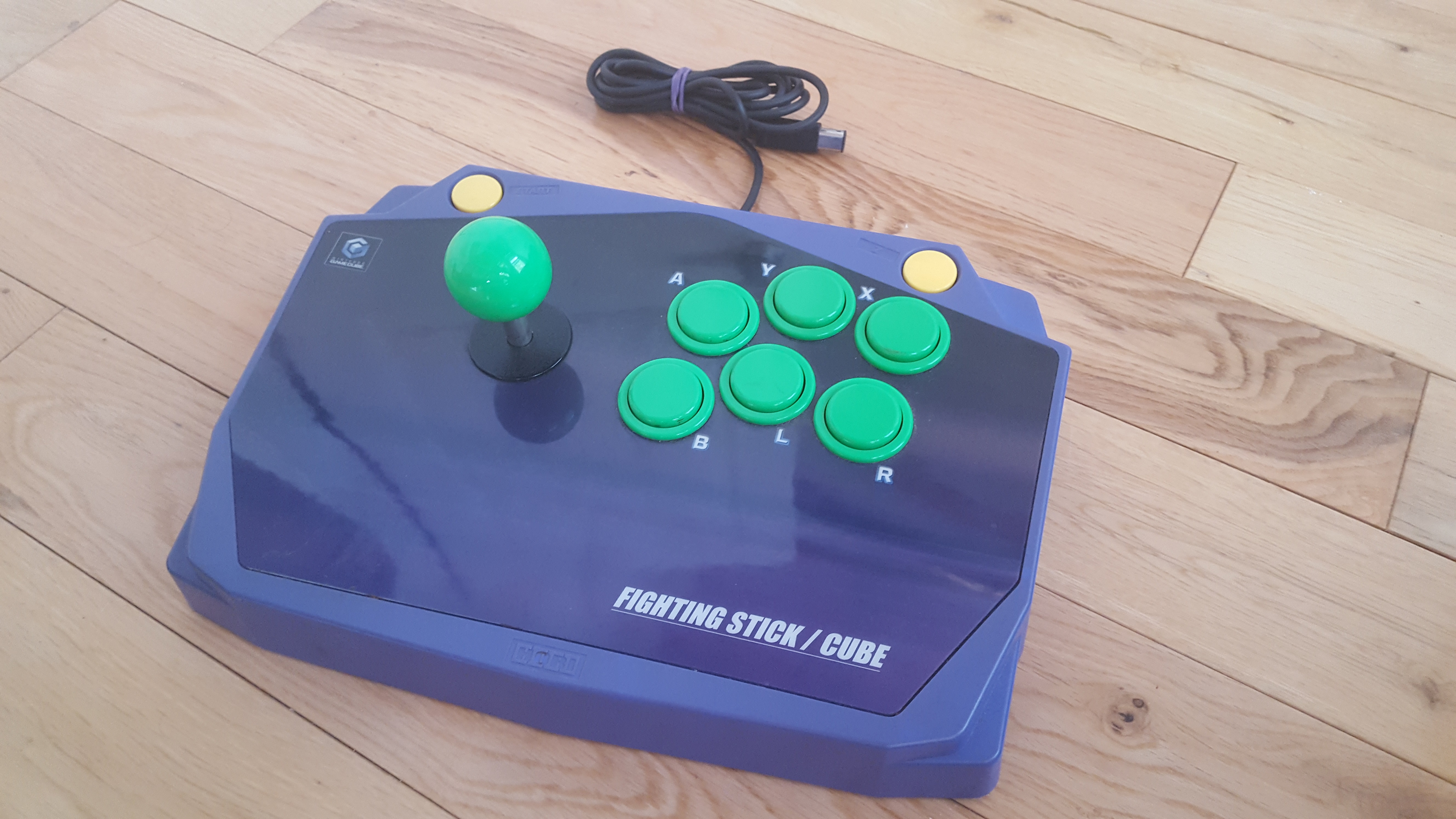
The Hori Fighting Stick

Hori built an arcade stick that was licensed by Nintendo. The controller does not support control stick or C-stick functionality. The system treats the stick like the D-pad on a standard controller. A standard variant has a purple faceplate, and the other has a SoulCalibur II faceplate.

==== Logitech Speed Force Racing Wheel ====
The Logitech Speed Force Racing Wheel is an officially licensed force feedback steering wheel made exclusively for the GameCube. It is supported by a number of games, including F-Zero GX, R: Racing Evolution, Mario Kart: Double Dash, Burnout 2, and the Need for Speed series, among others. An optional accessory pack includes foot pedals and a lap attachment.

==== Pedometer and walking pad controller ====
A pedometer and walking pad controller was bundled with the Japanese pilgrimage simulation game Ohenro-San: Hosshin no Dojo.

=== Audio/Video cables ===
Compatibility with various A/V cables vary by region and console model.

==== RF Switch/modulator ====
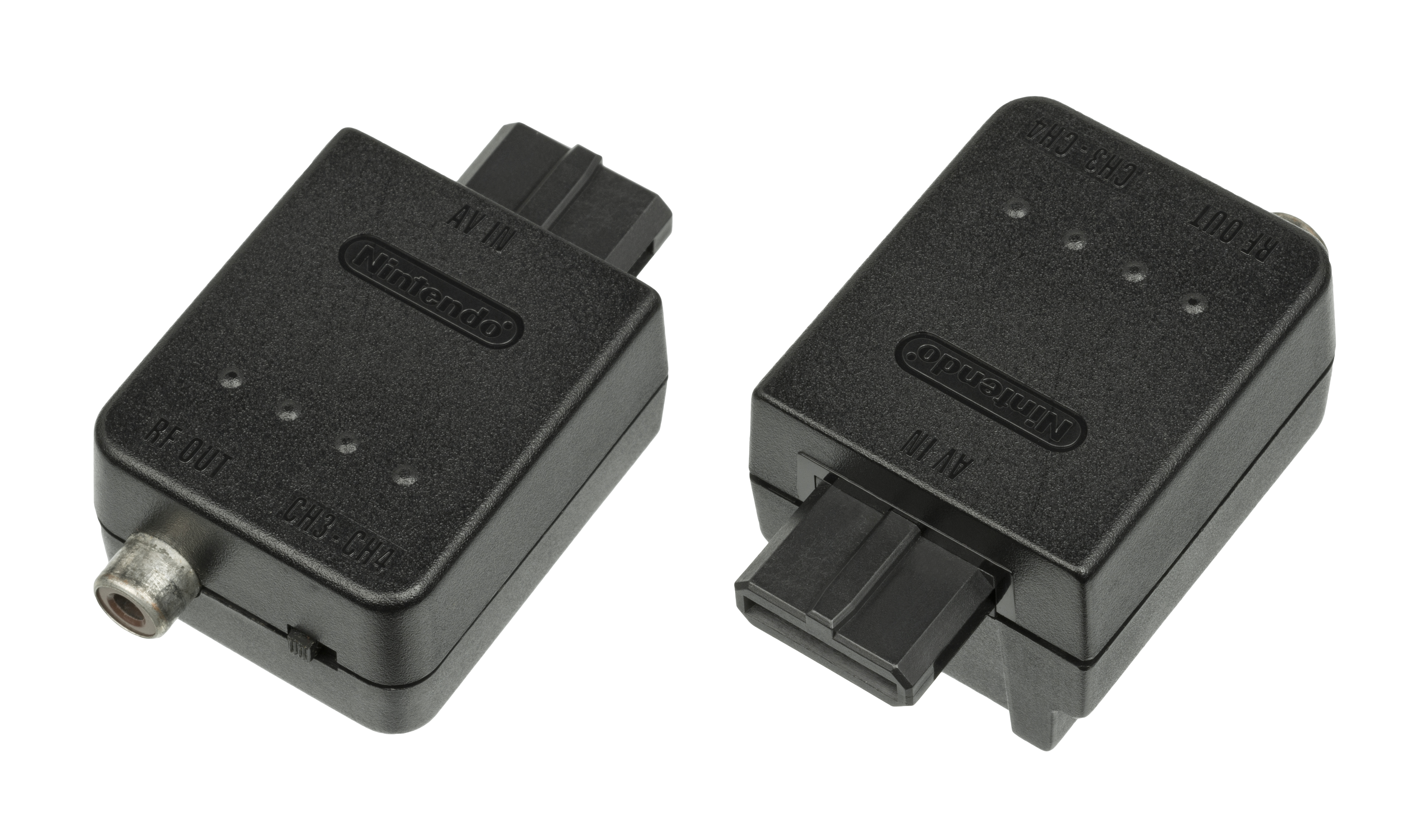
The RF adapter for the Nintendo 64 and the GameCube

The RF Switch/modulator is for older televisions predating composite audio/video ports. It is identical to and compatible with earlier Nintendo RF modulators. It has the Nintendo 64 RF modulator cased in GameCube packaging, and its RF switch is the same as the original Nintendo Entertainment System and Super NES.

==== Composite video cable ====
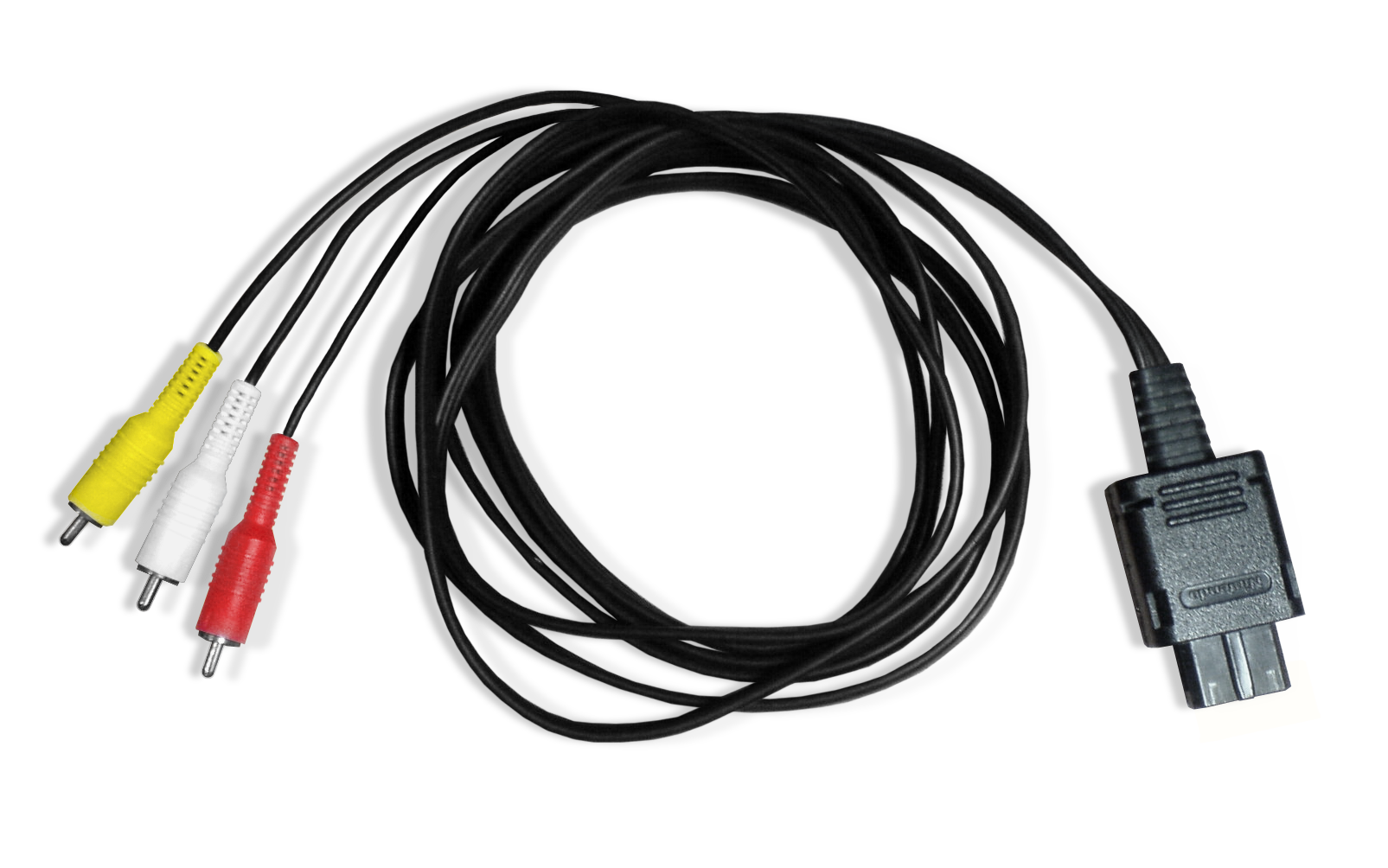
GameCube composite video cable

The composite video cable, or AV cable, is included with the GameCube. It provides clearer and sharper picture quality and audio than an RF Switch. It is identical to earlier A/V cables. It carries dual-channel (stereo) audio and composite video at 576i/50 Hz (PAL) or 480i/60 Hz (NTSC/PAL60). PAL consoles come with a composite to SCART adapter in European territories to allow Composite input via a SCART port.

==== S-Video cable ====
The S-Video Cable provides a better quality picture than composite cables, although not up to that of the Component or RGB Cables. Identical to earlier Nintendo (N64 and the original model SNES) S-Video cables and compatible with their respective consoles, it carries dual-channel (stereo) audio and s-video at 480i/60 Hz (NTSC). This cable is only compatible with NTSC GameCubes.

==== RGB SCART cable ====
The RGB SCART cable provides a better quality picture than RF, composite or S-Video cables. It utilizes the SCART connector standard and is sold in Europe only. Operates at 576i/50 Hz or 480i/60 Hz. This cable is only compatible with PAL GameCubes.

==== Component video cable ====
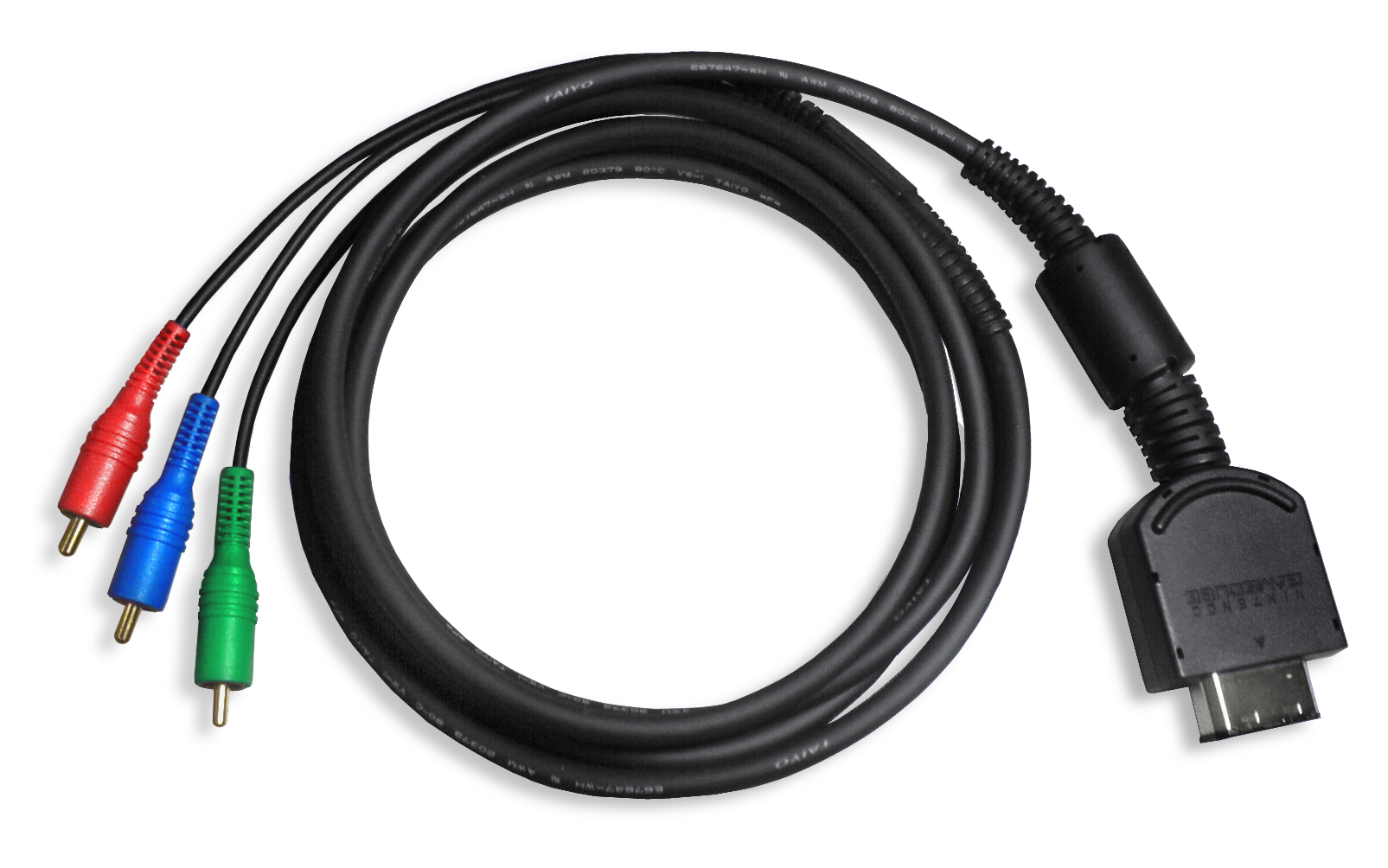
GameCube component cable

The Component Video Cable provides video quality superior to that of the RF modulator, composite video cable and S-Video cable and is equal in quality to RGB SCART (at 576i/50 Hz or 480i/60 Hz). It enables progressive scan (480p/60 Hz) in supported games which is not possible with most other cables. The Japan-only D-Terminal cable also has this feature. PAL released games lack progressive 480p output. The connector plugs into the Digital AV port rather than the Analog AV port used by other cables and contains a Macronix CMPV-DOL video chip (a digital-to-analog converter). This converts the YC_{B}C_{R} digital video coming from the digital port to the YP_{B}P_{R} analog format used by component video equipment. CMPV-DOL's reconfigurability allows it to carry out unusual functions such as YC_{B}C_{R} to RGBHV conversion, but it cannot take advantage of the digital audio from the console's digital port. This means that a separate cable, such as the system's standard A/V cable, must also be connected to the Analog AV port in order to transmit the audio signal.

This cable is only compatible with DOL-001 models of the GameCube, as Nintendo omitted the Digital AV port in subsequent models of the console to reduce cost.

==== D-Terminal cable ====
The D-Terminal Video Cable is identical to the Component Video Cable but for its connector, which is a more popular format in Japan. Like the component cable, it may be used to output video in 576i/50 Hz, 480i/60 Hz or 480p/60 Hz, uses the Digital AV port, needs a separate analog cable for audio, and is only compatible with DOL-001 models of the GameCube.

=== Other ===
==== Memory cards ====
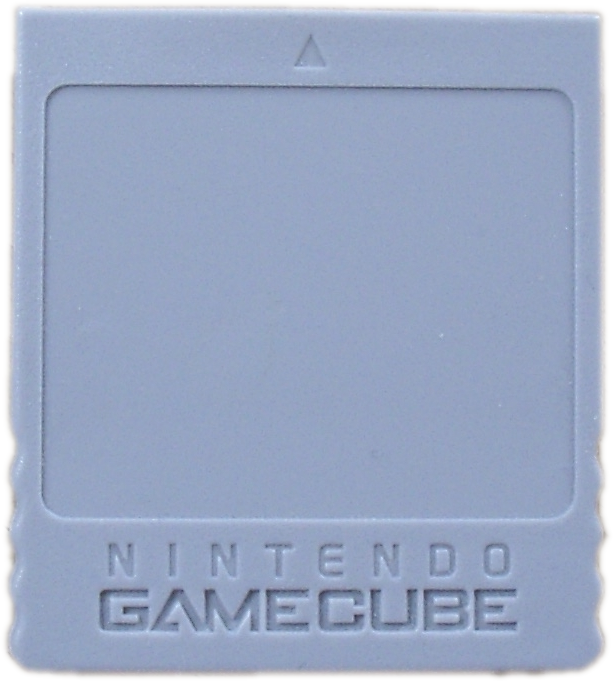
Memory Card 59

The GameCube's memory card options comprise three distinctive capacities, with each exhibiting a different color variant. Specifically, these card models include the Memory Card 59 in grey, boasting a storage capacity of 4 Mbit or 512 KB; the 251 model in black with a capacity of 16 Mbit or 2 MB; and the 1019 model in white, exhibiting the largest storage capacity of 64 Mbit or 8 MB. The maximum capacity for a single card is 127 files. Each card necessitates five blocks of system data, denoting that the physical dimensions of the cards are either 64, 256, or 1024.

Certain games, such as Animal Crossing and Pokémon Colosseum, require very large save files and were originally bundled with a Memory Card 59 with game-themed stickers. Pokémon Box: Ruby and Sapphire was bundled with an exclusive translucent red and blue colored Memory Card 59, with matching stickers. Club Nintendo members in Japan briefly had the opportunity to exchange points for a white and blue Memory Card 251, with club themed stickers.

==== SD Card Adapter ====
The SD Card Adapter is a passive memory card adapter that connects an SD card in SPI mode to the EXI interface in the Memory Card Slot, which is electrically compatible with SPI. This adapter is used by Dōbutsu no Mori e+ and Pokémon Channel, as well as many unofficial games and programs. A notable feature present in the SD Card Adapter not found in its clones is a physical Write-Protect switch to detect if the inserted SD card is write protected. Unofficial clones are often referred to as an SDGecko, and one is included with the SD Media Launcher.

==== GameCube–Game Boy Advance cable ====
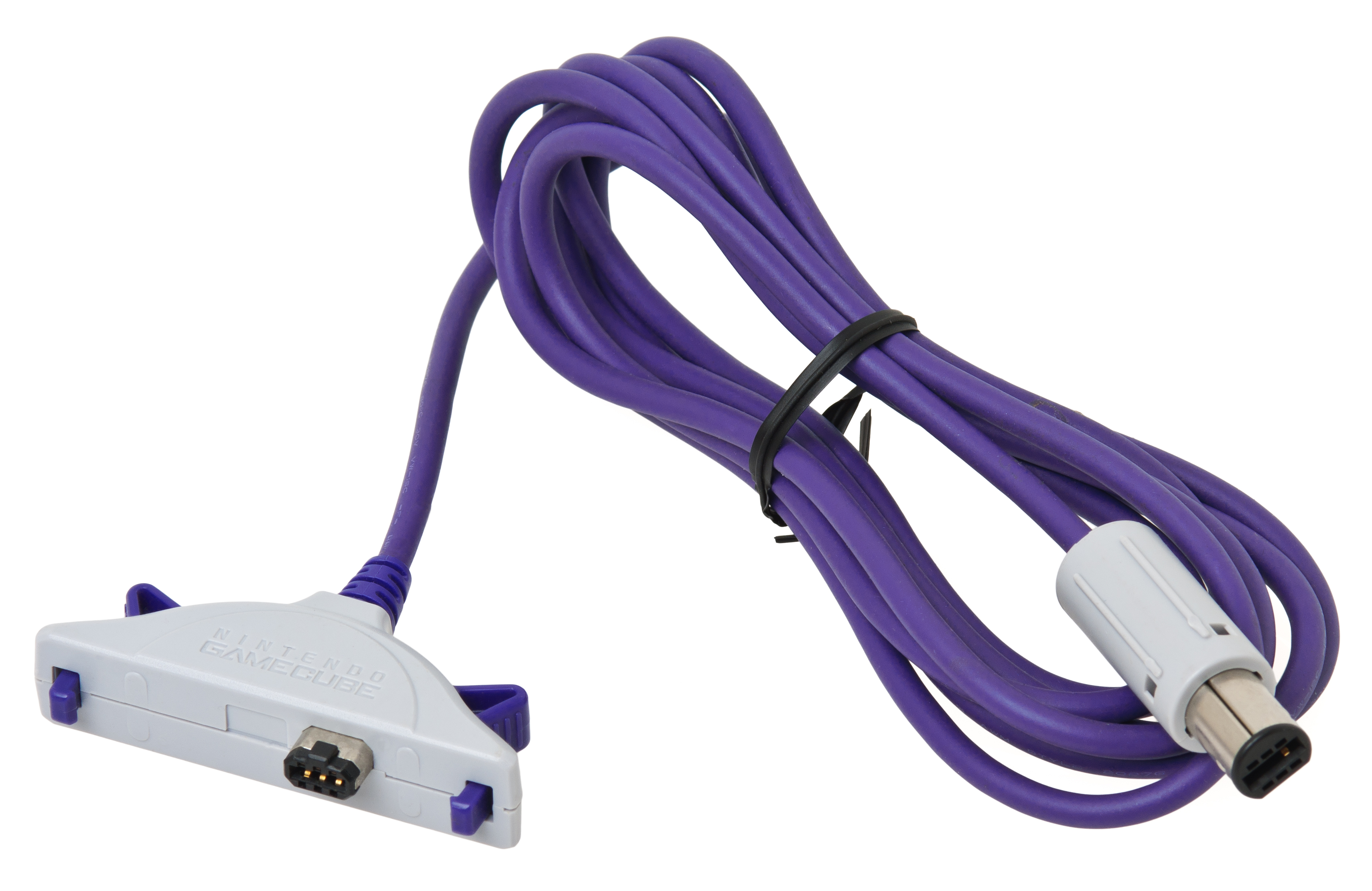
GameCube-Game Boy Advance cable

The GameCube–Game Boy Advance cable was used to connect a Game Boy Advance to the GameCube through its controller port. Compatible GameCube games could exchange data with a connected GBA game, unlocking additional content, or download applications to the GBA's temporary memory, allowing the player to play exclusive minigames or use the GBA as a second screen during gameplay. The cable was supported by over 60 GameCube games.

==== Modem and Broadband adapters ====
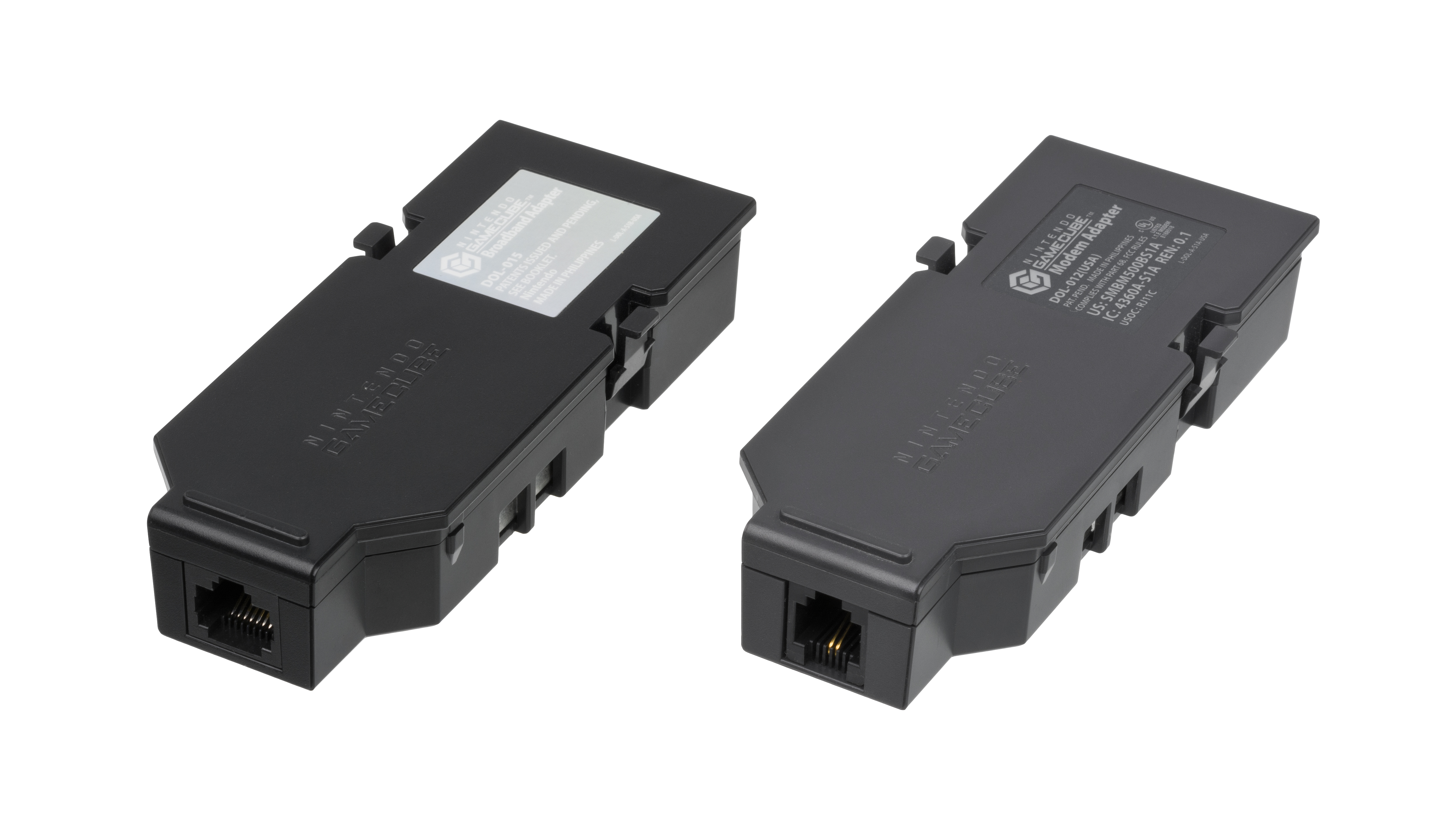
The official broadband and dial-up modem adapters

The Modem adapter and Broadband adapter, models DOL-012 and DOL-015 respectively, were developed by Nintendo for Internet and LAN networking. They allowed for players to connect online in select games such as Phantasy Star Online Episode I & II. They also allowed players to link multiple systems together through LAN to play multiplayer across multiple television screens, which was used in games like Mario Kart: Double Dash. Only eight games support the devices. Both connect to Serial Port 1.

==== Game Boy Player ====
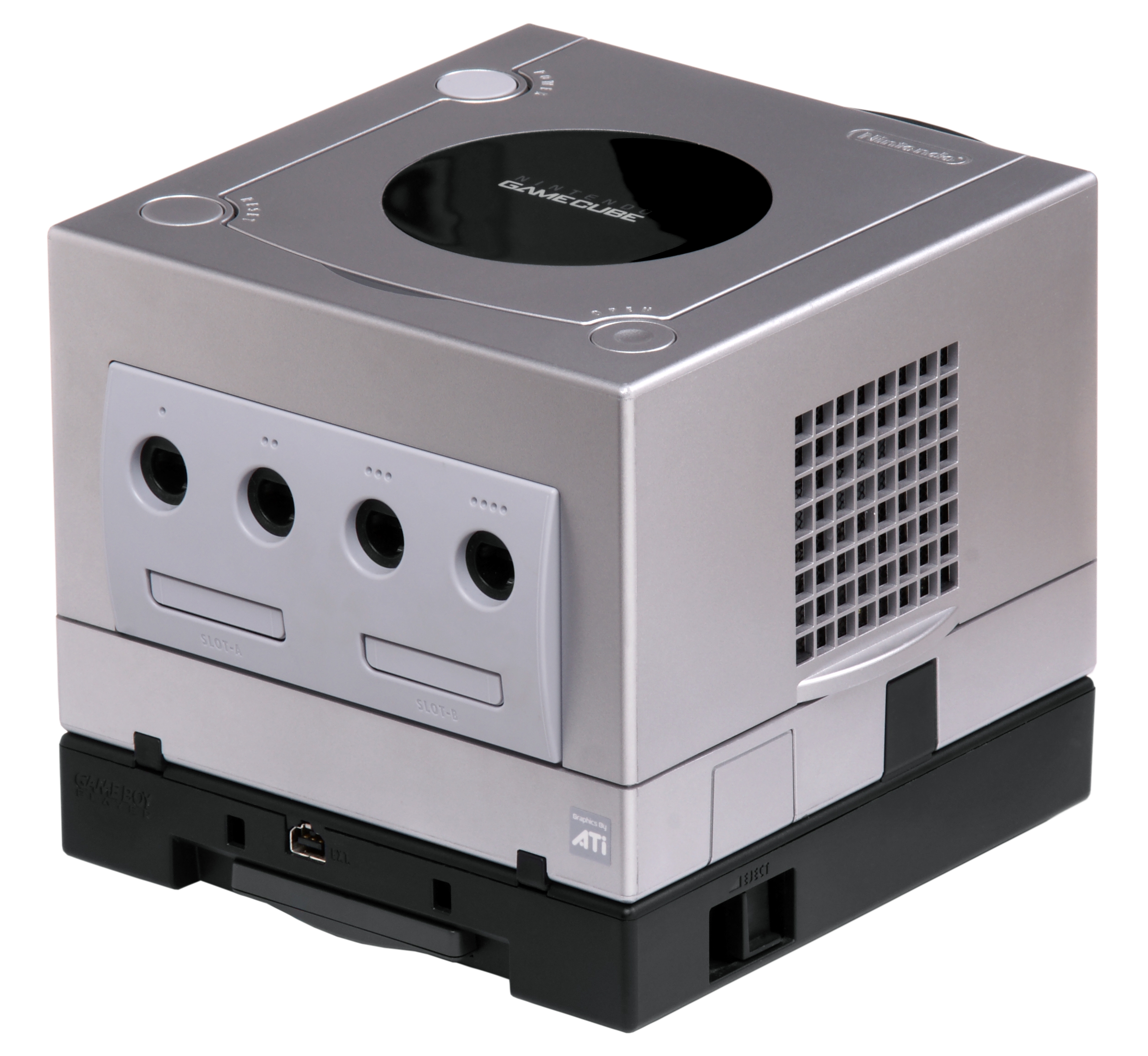
Platinum GameCube with Game Boy Player attached

The Game Boy Player allows Game Boy, Game Boy Color, and Game Boy Advance games to be played on the television, using either a GameCube controller or a connected Game Boy Advance which connects to the controller port.

==== Microphone ====
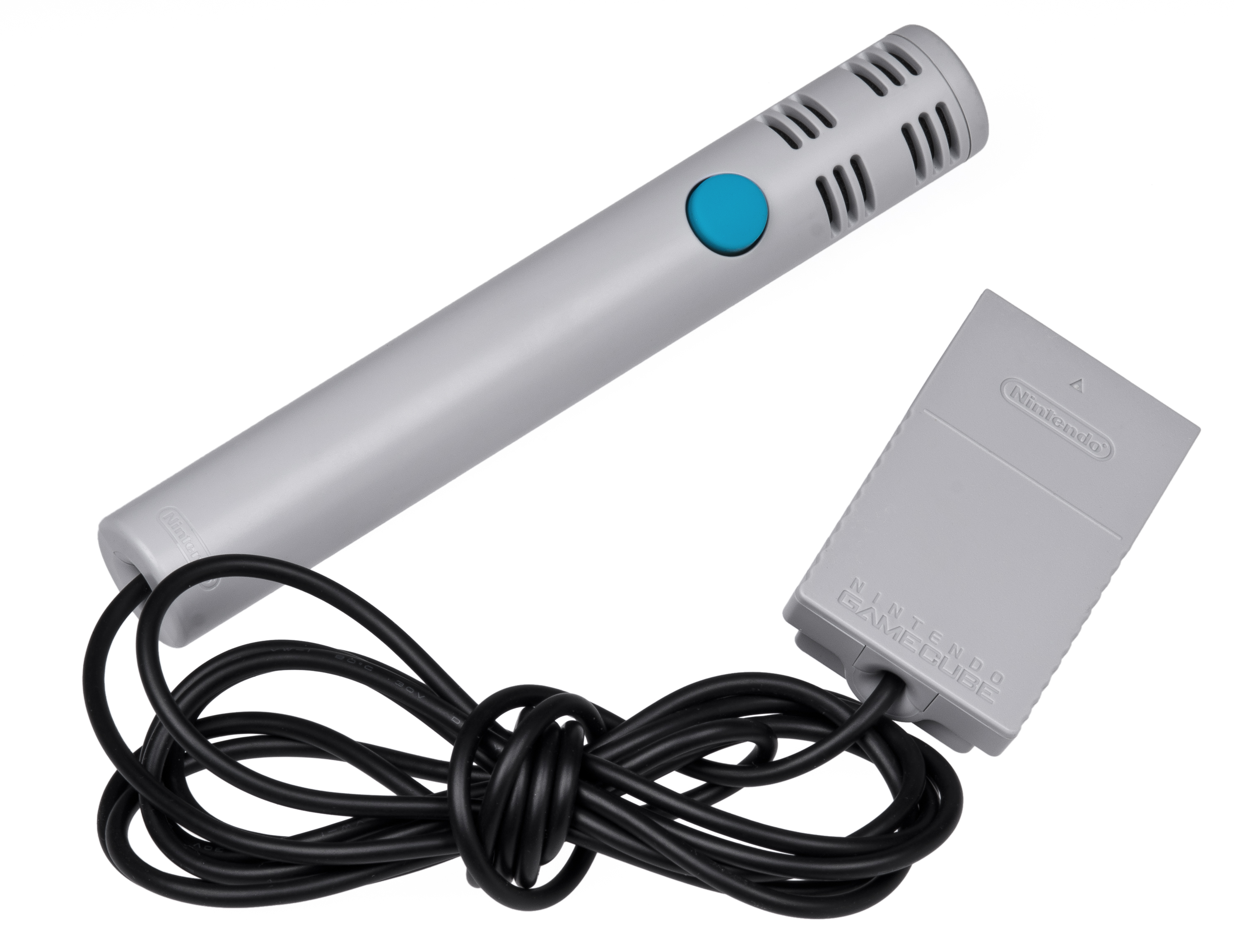
GameCube Microphone

The Microphone plugs into one of the memory card slots. The Microphone functions with Mario Party 6, Mario Party 7, Karaoke Revolution Party, Odama, Chibi-Robo!, and Densetsu no Quiz Ou Ketteisen. Odama includes a clip to attach the microphone to the controller. Commands are issued when users hold the X button on the controller. In Mario Party 6 and 7, the microphone is used for voice-based mini games. In Chibi-Robo, the microphone lets the player have minor interactions with Chibi-Robo as an Easter egg. The microphone bundled with Mario Party 6 and 7, Odama, and Densetsu no Quiz Ou Ketteisen is grey, and the one with Karaoke Revolution Party is black.

==== ProDG ====
ProDG is an officially licensed development tool for the GameCube.

==== Carrying cases ====
Several official carrying cases for the GameCube and discs have various size and shapes. They were all manufactured by A.L.S. Industries INC and use an NGC model number.

== Third party ==
=== Datel ===
==== Action Replay ====
Action Replay is a cheat device made by Datel, allowing input of codes that modify the game. A FreeLoader is included with the software. It contains a boot disc with the codes and startup, and a dongle that connects into memory card slot B and stores 1 or 2 memory blocks. Its save file can be copied onto other memory cards, as well, allowing for one person to share their codes with someone who may have an earlier version of Action Replay, or the sharing of custom-made codes.

Action Replay MAX is the same but its dongle has more storage, 64 Mb card with 1019 blocks.

==== Freeloader ====
FreeLoader disables the regional lockout in the GameCube, allowing games from any region (PAL, NTSC, NTSC-J, etc.) to be played on a console from any region. Some Freeloaders are compatible with the Wii, allowing out of region GameCube games on it (later blocked by system updates).

==== Advance Game Port ====
The Advance Game Port is Datel's version of the Game Boy Player. This dongle connects to memory card slot B and is booted up with the included boot disc. Later models have code generators for built in Action Replay cheat devices. Unlike the Game Boy Player, it uses emulation rather than containing original hardware, resulting in audio and video issues as well as limited game compatibility. As it connects via a Memory Card Slot rather than the Hi-Speed Port, it was compatible with the Wii prior to a 2007 update that blocked the use of Datel software discs.

==== Powerboard ====
The Powerboard is a USB keyboard by Datel with a GameCube adapter for the online Phantasy Star games and for Action Replay codes. The keyboard without the adapter was released for the PlayStation 2.

==== MAX Drive ====
The MAX Drive consists of a dongle, USB cable, and a PC software disc, which allows the user to upload saved games from a memory card to a PC, to be stored there or sent over the Internet.

==== MAX Memory ====
The MAX Memory is a 128 Mbit (16 MB) dongle by Datel that contains up to 2048 blocks of data.

==== MAX Media Player ====
The MAX Media Player allows videos and other downloadable media to be played on a GameCube. Movies and media are transferred to the included 1 GB Micro SD card, that is then inserted into a dongle for the GameCube and into memory card slot B. The kit also includes boot disc, SD adapter (for use on the Wii in GameCube mode), USB micro SD Card adaptor, and a small remote control for easy management.

==== SD media launcher ====
The SD Media Launcher allows homebrew games to be played on the GameCube without modifying the console. The dongle connects into the memory card slot and contains a removable SD card which holds the games. It has a boot disc for starting the unit up, a 1 GB SD card, and an SD card adapter for uploading games from a PC to the GameCube.

=== Other companies ===
==== Afterglow controller ====
The Afterglow Controller was produced by Pelican Accessories. It's known widely for being a largely unsuccessful addition to the GameCube ecosystem.

==== Battery Pack ====
Intec produced a battery pack which can be attached securely to the bottom of a GameCube, offering about two hours on a charge. It was designed to work with an LCD screen.

==== Controller extension cables ====
Various companies have produced controller extension cables for the GameCube.

==== Hip Screen ====
The Hip Screen is a controller made by Hip Gear that features a small full color LCD screen as TV. Its size was roughly that of the Game Boy Advance, so games that had very fine text could not be well read on it.

==== LCD Screens ====
Various manufacturers (such as Intec, Mad Catz, and Zenith Electronics) have produced LCD screens that can snap onto the GameCube, allowing the console to be used without a separate television screen. Such screens are powered by the GameCube's power supply and connects to the console's digital AV outlet. These snap-on LCD screens make the GameCube more portable.

==== Pelican Bongos ====
The Pelican Bongos were made by Pelican Accessories and resemble DK Bongos. They are a much darker color and have a 10% larger surface than the Nintendo bongos.

==== PlayStation controller adapters ====
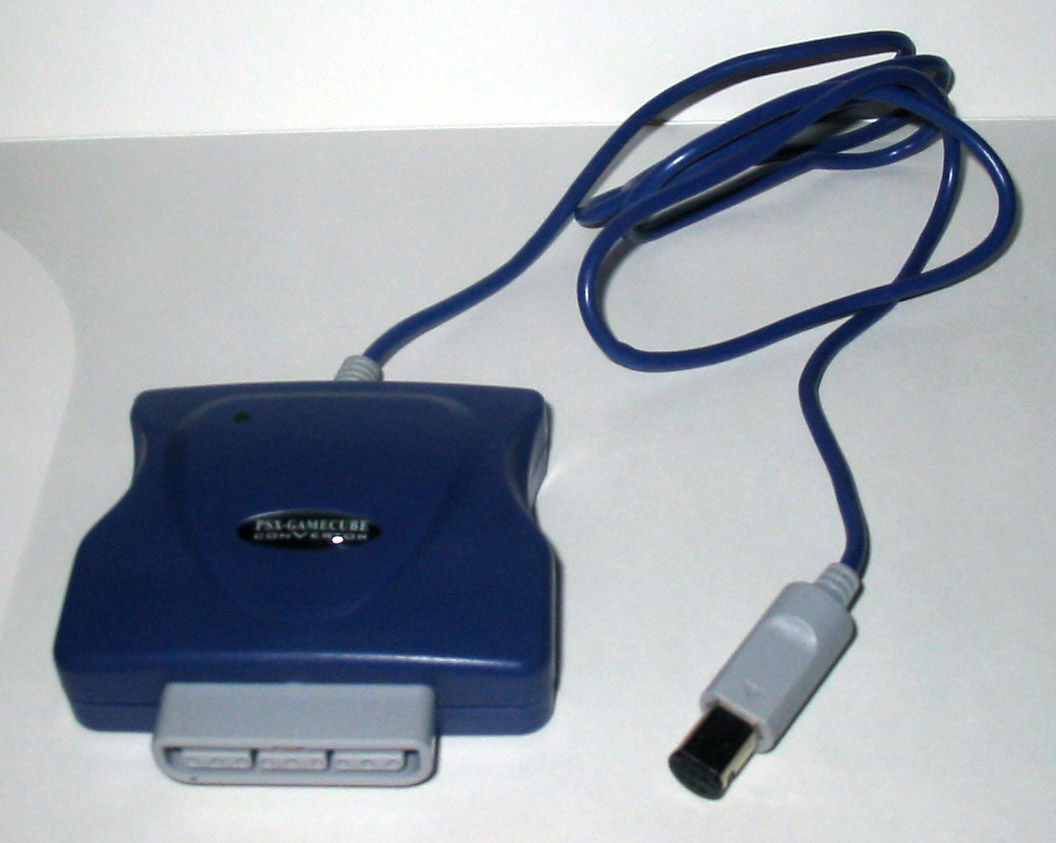
Hais GameCube Smart Joy PlayStation controller adapter

Various adapters allow PlayStation and PlayStation 2 controllers to be used on the GameCube, including:

- Innovation INNOV3102 Controller Adaptor
- Mayflash Cube Joy Box
- Hais GameCube Smart Joy (HS2125C)

==== SmashBox Controller ====
In the mid-2010s, Dustin Hoffer of Hit Box designed the SmashBox controller. Specifically designed for competitive play of Super Smash Bros. Melee, it replaces the GameCube controller's analog stick with a button layout. It may allow more precise and rapid input, though it has a steeper learning curve than the traditional controller, and puts less stress on the hands. After a half year test period, various prominent tournament organizers prohibited the SmashBox controller and similar alternative controllers in high-level tournaments for the foreseeable future.

==== VGA cable ====
The VGA Cable is a modified component or d-terminal cable. It allows the GameCube play on a standard computer monitor in 480p.

==== GCVideo ====
GCVideo is an open-source video solution created by Unseen that uses the Digital AV port (DOL-001 only) to output a digital video signal via HDMI or an analog signal via a component cable. Anyone can produce an adapter that uses the GCVideo firmware because it is open-source software. Many companies have made solutions that use the software to output an HDMI signal that can be used with any modern TVs. It also can handle audio, sending a digital 16-bit PCM audiostream. This includes the GCHD Mk-II by EON Gaming and the Carby by Insurrection Industries. Both do not require modification of a GameCube and can simply be plugged into the Digital AV port.
