= MP7 (disambiguation) =

MP7 or MP 7 may refer to:

- Heckler & Koch MP7, a German submachine gun.
- A Mammal Paleogene zone during the Oligocene geological period
- MPEG-7, a video encoding standard
- Mario Party 7, a 2005 video game and the fourth and final Mario Party game for the Nintendo GameCube
