= List of best-selling GameCube video games =

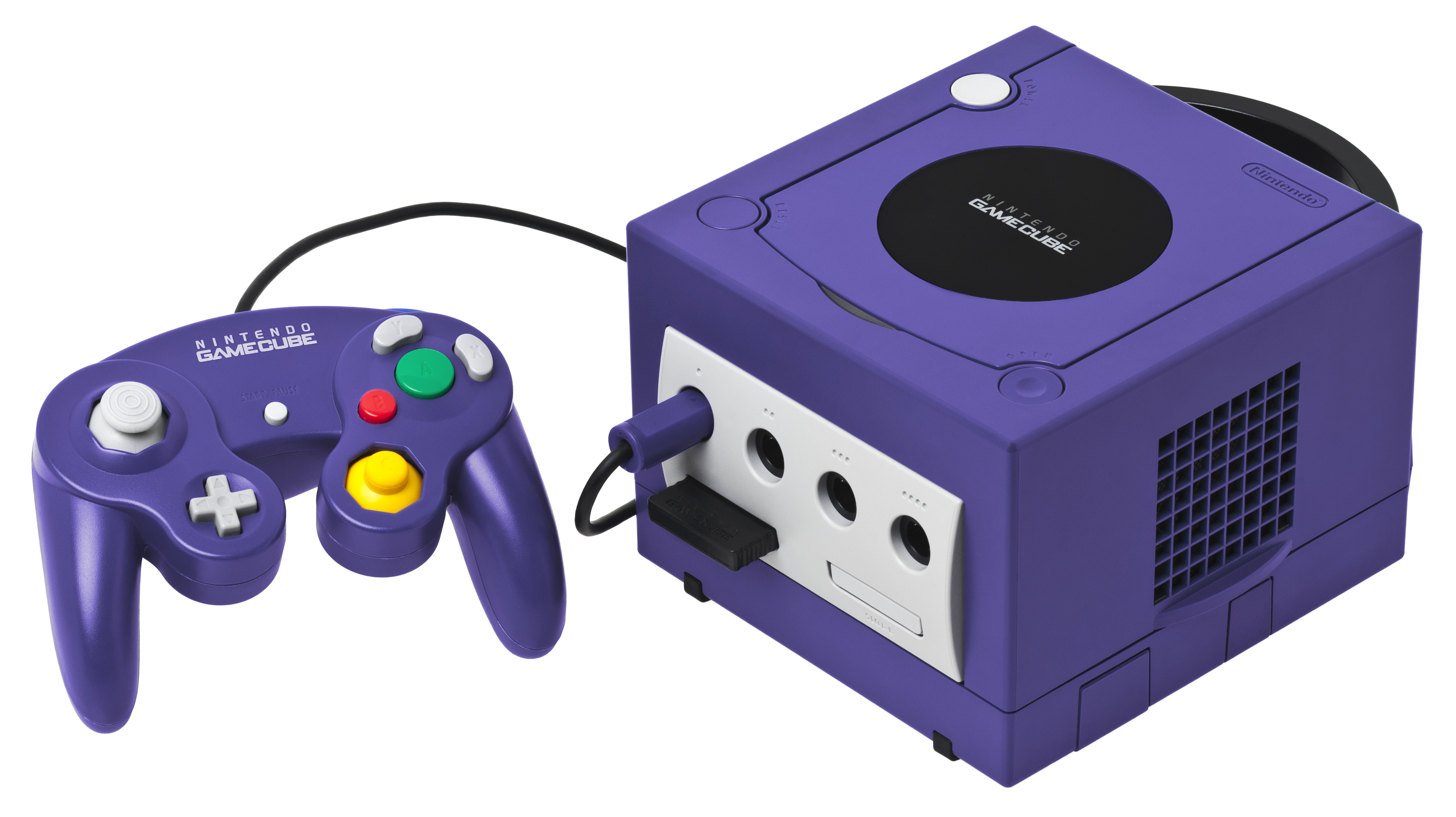
GameCube with controller

This is a list of video games for the GameCube video game console that have sold or shipped at least one million copies. The best-selling game on the GameCube is Super Smash Bros. Melee. First released in Japan on November 21, 2001, it went on to sell just over 7.4 million units worldwide. The second best-selling game was Mario Kart: Double Dash, selling 6.88 million units. Super Mario Sunshine is the console's third best-selling game, with 5.91 million units.

There are a total of 36 GameCube games on this list which are confirmed to have sold or shipped at least one million units. Of these, eight were developed by internal Nintendo development divisions. Other developers with the most million-selling titles include Hudson Soft and Namco with four games each, and Capcom with three games. Of the 36 games on this list, 26 were published in one or more regions by Nintendo. Other publishers with multiple million-selling games include Sega with five games, all of which being in the Sonic the Hedgehog franchise, Capcom with three games, and The Pokémon Company with two games. The best-selling franchises on GameCube include Resident Evil (4.2 million combined sales), The Legend of Zelda (5.75 million combined sales), Sonic the Hedgehog (7.1 million combined sales), and most notably Mario (26.68 million combined sales).

By June 30, 2024, 208.58 million total copies of games had been sold for the GameCube. Despite coming in at 3rd place during the 6th generation of video game consoles, it has the highest attach rate of any Nintendo console at 9.59.

== List ==
Game	Copies sold	Release date (Note: Only the initial release date on this platform is listed.)	Developer(s)	Publisher(s)
Super Smash Bros. Melee	7.41 million	November 21, 2001	HAL Laboratory	Nintendo
Mario Kart: Double Dash	6.88 million	November 14, 2003	Nintendo EAD	Nintendo
Super Mario Sunshine	5.91 million	July 19, 2002	Nintendo EAD	Nintendo
The Legend of Zelda: The Wind Waker	4.43 million	December 13, 2002	Nintendo EAD	Nintendo
Luigi's Mansion	3.33 million (Note: Luigi's Mansion sales breakdown: Japan – 348,918; United Kingdom – 100,000; United States – 2.19 million)	September 14, 2001	Nintendo EAD	Nintendo
Metroid Prime	2.84 million	November 18, 2002	Retro Studios	Nintendo
Animal Crossing	2.7 million (Note: Animal Crossing sales breakdown: Japan – 641,300 (original) and 386,258 (e+); United States – 1.68 million)	December 14, 2001	Nintendo EAD	Nintendo
Mario Party 4	2.46 million	October 21, 2002	Hudson Soft	Nintendo
Pokémon Colosseum	2.41 million	November 21, 2003	Genius Sonority	Nintendo; The Pokémon Company
Mario Party 5	2.17 million	November 10, 2003	Hudson Soft	Nintendo
Mario Party 7	2.08 million	November 7, 2005	Hudson Soft	Nintendo
Paper Mario: The Thousand-Year Door	1.91 million	July 22, 2004	Intelligent Systems	Nintendo
Star Fox Adventures	1.82 million	September 23, 2002	Rare	Nintendo
Sonic Adventure 2: Battle	1.73 million (Note: Sonic Adventure 2: Battle sales breakdown: Japan – 192,186; United Kingdom – 100,000; United States – 1.44 million)	December 20, 2001	Sonic Team USA	Sega
Mario Party 6	1.63 million	November 18, 2004	Hudson Soft	Nintendo
Pikmin	1.60 million	October 26, 2001	Nintendo EAD	Nintendo
Resident Evil 4	1.60 million	January 11, 2005	Capcom Production Studio 4	Capcom
Sonic Adventure DX: Director's Cut	1.60 million	June 18, 2003	Sonic Team	Sega
Super Mario Strikers	1.60 million	November 18, 2005	Next Level Games	Nintendo
The Legend of Zelda: Twilight Princess	1.43 million	December 2, 2006	Nintendo EAD	Nintendo
Pokémon XD: Gale of Darkness	1.42 million	August 4, 2005	Genius Sonority	Nintendo; The Pokémon Company
Sonic Heroes	1.42 million	December 30, 2003	Sonic Team	Sega
Sonic Mega Collection	1.37 million (Note: Sonic Mega Collection sales breakdown: Japan – 72,967; United States – 1.30 million)	November 10, 2002	Sonic Team	Sega
Resident Evil	1.35 million	March 22, 2002	Capcom Production Studio 4	Capcom
Kirby Air Ride	1.35 million	July 11, 2003	HAL Laboratory	Nintendo
Final Fantasy Crystal Chronicles	1.30 million	August 8, 2003	The Game Designers Studio	Nintendo
Resident Evil Zero	1.25 million	November 12, 2002	Capcom	Capcom
Mario Golf: Toadstool Tour	1.22 million (Note: Mario Golf: Toadstool Tour sales breakdown: Japan – 192,802; United States – 1.03 million)	July 28, 2003	Camelot Software Planning	Nintendo
Donkey Konga	1.18 million	December 12, 2003	Namco	Nintendo
Mario Power Tennis	1.16 million	October 28, 2004	Camelot Software Planning	Nintendo
Star Wars Rogue Squadron II: Rogue Leader	1.13 million (Note: Star Wars Rogue Squadron II: Rogue Leader sales breakdown: United Kingdom – 100,000; United States – 1.03 million (Note: Erroneously listed as Star Wars: Battlefront II))	November 18, 2001	Factor 5	LucasArts
Pikmin 2	1.12 million	April 29, 2004	Nintendo EAD	Nintendo
Metroid Prime 2: Echoes	1.10 million	November 15, 2004	Retro Studios	Nintendo
Soulcalibur II	1.09 million (Note: Soulcalibur II sales breakdown: Japan – 99,256; United States – 1 million)	March 27, 2003	Namco	Namco
Mario Superstar Baseball	1.05 million	July 21, 2005	Namco	Nintendo
Sonic Gems Collection	1 million	August 11, 2005	Sonic Team	Sega

== See also ==
- List of best-selling Nintendo video games
