= Smash Box controller =

GameCube custom device

A prototype of the Smash Box controller prior to the Kickstarter and production, as of March 2017

The Smash Box controller is a custom arcade controller designed by Dustin Huffer and developed by Hit Box from 2014 to 2017. Specifically designed for competitive play of Super Smash Bros. Melee, the Smash Box controller replaces the GameCube controller's analog stick with a button layout. This controller may allow more precise and rapid input, though it has a steeper learning curve than the traditional controller. Moreover, the Smash Box controller may have various health benefits, as it puts less stress on the hands of its user. The Smash Box is currently a legal controller for major Super Smash Bros. and fighting game tournaments, with it and other all-button controllers finding more acceptance and use throughout the communities.

== Background and development ==
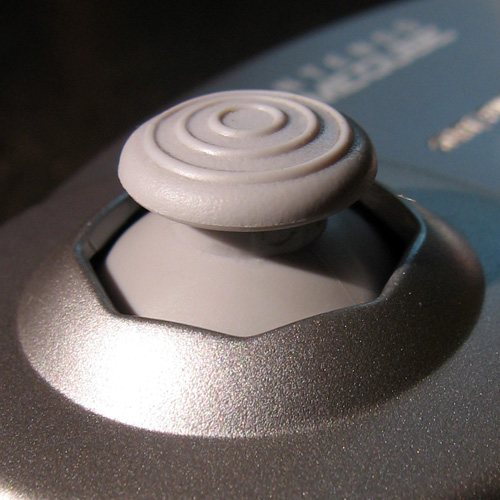
The GameCube controller's left analog stick

Super Smash Bros. Melee is traditionally played using the standard GameCube controller, which features two analog sticks with octagonal gates that allow accurate input in eight directions. However, as the high-level Super Smash Bros. community has developed over time, professional players need to perform with extreme levels of precision. Some players would hold their controller in a "claw" position, using the index finger in tandem with the thumb, in order to move the analog stick more precisely. As Imad Khan of ESPN described the situation: "As competitive matches can have players hitting six inputs per second, accidental slipping of the thumb stick can mean a win or loss." A large variety of different controllers are also compatible with the Super Smash Bros. series, but the original GameCube controller is generally considered superior to more modern models because of its octagonal gate and analog buttons. This has resulted in scarcity of the original model.

Dustin Huffer, founder of Hit Box, designed and developed the Smash Box controller in order to make input as binary as possible (removing the analog stick) and removing the controller's inconsistencies. In an interview with ESPN, Huffer said that his goal was "to evolve competitive gaming hardware for Smash," claiming that the GameCube controller created a "physical learning barrier preventing newcomers from joining in as well as putting a cap on many players' competitive lifespan with carpal tunnel and other RSIs." Development of the Smash Box controller started in 2014 and it became available to some professional players in 2016. Huffer told Kotaku in December 2016 that he was planning to launch a Kickstarter campaign for the controller, but its legal status in tournament play slowed down his plans.

== Characteristics ==
Rather than an analog stick or joystick, the Smash Box controller features four analog direction buttons, allowing players to hit each button individually. This layout and the controller's flat surface allows each individual finger access to any button, eliminating the need for rapid and precise thumb movements. Involved usage of the Smash Box controller may still result in Ulnar tunnel syndrome and general postural concerns, but it is overall less stressful than the original controller. Hungrybox explained that the learning curve for the Smash Box controller is very steep, but it "theoretically could make someone the most technical player of all time." The binary input method could also be of use for tool-assisted superplays.

== Tournament legality ==
Discussion arose among the professional Super Smash Bros. community as to whether the new controller should be considered legal for tournament use. In December 2016, Huffer was told in a private conversation with Genesis 4 organizers that the controller may be banned from the major Smash Bros. Melee tournament. After Huffer explained the situation to professional player Dustin "Gravy" White, the topic caught fire on social media. Huffer himself described the potential ban as "definitely unfair." Tournament organizers were worried that allowing the Smash Box controller to be used in tournament play would allow other unconventional and possibly game-breaking controllers to be used as well. Genesis 4-organizer Sheridan Zalewski announced later that month that the Smash Box controller was allowed to be used in the tournament, noting that this would initiate a "test period" in which players could determine whether the controller gives an unfair advantage over players who use the traditional GameCube controller. Zalewski later stated that this concession was only made to accommodate competitors who had signed up without realizing their controllers would be banned.

In July 2017, a committee of five prominent Melee tournament organizers, including Zalewski, released a recommended ruleset for professional Melee competitions. This document includes a lengthy section imposing a "tentative ban" on the use of non-GameCube controllers such as the Smash Box controller, stating that the classic controller is "somewhat intrinsic to what we consider 'playing Melee' and the skills involved in doing so." Alex Jebailey tweeted his support for this decision and stated in an interview that alternative controllers "should rightfully be scrutinized and tested at a local level before being allowed to used in a major scale event."

The Smash Box controller was allowed during the Super Smash Bros. competition at Evo 2018. It is currently legal at major Super Smash Bros. and fighting game events, such as Genesis, Smash World Tour, and EVO.
