= Mario Party 7 =

2005 video game

- Packaging artwork
- Developer: Hudson Soft
- Publisher: Nintendo
- Director: Shuichiro Nishiya
- Producers: Hiroshi Sato; Atsushi Ikeda
- Composers: Hironobu Yahata; Shinya Outouge
- Series: Mario Party
- Platform: GameCube
- Release: NA: November 7, 2005; JP: November 10, 2005; UK: January 27, 2006; EU: February 10, 2006
- Genre: Party
- Modes: Single-player, multiplayer

Mario Party 7 (Note: Japanese: マリオパーティ7, Hepburn: Mario Pāti Sebun) is a 2005 party video game developed by Hudson Soft and published by Nintendo for the GameCube. It is the seventh main installment in the Mario Party series, as well as the fourth and final game in the series to be released for the GameCube. The game was released in North America on November 7, 2005; in Japan on November 10, 2005; in the United Kingdom on January 27, 2006; and in Europe on February 10, 2006.

Like most installments in the Mario Party series, Mario Party 7 features characters from the Mario franchise, each controlled by either a human player or artificial intelligence, competing in an interactive board game with a variety of minigames. Many of the minigames make use of the GameCube microphone peripheral introduced in Mario Party 6 (2004). Mario Party 7 also introduces game modes and minigames that involve up to eight players competing simultaneously. The game features twelve playable characters (two of whom are unlockable), six game boards, and more than eighty minigames.

Mario Party 7 received mixed reviews from critics, who generally praised its minigames and eight-player mechanics, though criticized its single-player mode and lack of new content overall. The game has sold more than two million copies worldwide, making it the 11th-best-selling game for the GameCube. Mario Party 7 was succeeded by Mario Party 8 for the Wii in 2007.

== Gameplay ==
Mario Party 7 features eight-player minigames, in which eight players can compete in four teams of two. Here, Princess Peach, Mario, Boo, Luigi, Toad, Wario, Princess Daisy, and Waluigi simultaneously attempt to jump rope in the minigame "Grin and Bar It".

Like most games in the Mario Party series, Mario Party 7 is a party video game in which players compete in a virtual board game. There are 12 playable characters, 10 of whom are available from the start: Mario, Luigi, Princess Peach, Yoshi, Wario, Princess Daisy, Waluigi, Toad, Boo, and Toadette. The two unlockable characters, Birdo and Dry Bones, are both introduced to the Mario Party series in this game. Each character can be controlled by either a human player or artificial intelligence (AI).

One of Mario Party 7's game modes, Party Cruise, allows up to four players to compete in Battle Royales (free-for-alls) and Tag Battles (teams of two), in addition to featuring 4-Team Battles, in which up to eight players are divided into teams of two. Each ruleset involves multiple players rolling dice (numbered one to ten in Battle Royales and one to five in Team Battles) to advance, playing minigames to earn coins, and sharing the goal of gathering more Stars than their opponents, with each of the six game boards requiring a different method of doing so. While Grand Canal and Bowser's Enchanted Inferno share the series's traditional system of reaching Stars and purchasing them for 20 coins each, Pagoda Peak sees Star prices increment by 10 every time one is obtained, Pyramid Park allows players to use coins to purchase rides on Chain Chomps to steal Stars from other players, Neon Heights involves each Star being in one of three treasure chests, and Windmillville requires players to purchase windmills to earn Stars. Toadsworth serves as the host for all of the boards. Regardless of which board is played, each game can last between 10 and 50 turns per player, and the player with the most Stars at the end of a game is the victor. If enabled, three of six Bonus Stars are awarded to players post-game; these Stars are based on randomly selected criteria, such as winning the most minigames or traveling the highest number of spaces.

Depending on which space a player lands on during a board game, they can gain or lose coins or initiate a minigame involving a non-playable character, such as Donkey Kong (DK), Koopa Kid, or Bowser. A minigame is automatically played every time each player has taken a turn, with the colors of the spaces players land on determining whether the minigame is a four-player free-for-all, two against two, or three against one. For performing well in minigames, players can earn coins, which can be used to purchase items to hinder other players. Orbs, items introduced in Mario Party 5 (2003) as "capsules", can be purchased at shops or collected on certain spaces during board games. An orb's effects can be self-inflicted, such as allowing a player to roll more than one die in a single turn. The effects can also be directed toward a rival, such as deducting coins, orbs, or a Star; these items may then be given to the player who used the orb. The latter type of orb can be placed up to five spaces behind or ahead of the player, and its effects are triggered when another player lands on or passes the space. Some orbs can be used only by certain characters.

Another game mode, Solo Cruise, differs from Party Cruise in that a player competes against one other character, controlled by either a human player or AI, to complete a set of tasks for each board. The objectives differ from the ones in Party Cruise, such as having to collect a specific number of Stars or possess a certain number of coins upon reaching a space. Once a player has completed all six boards, they are added to the rankings section, which shows the players who took the fewest turns to finish them.

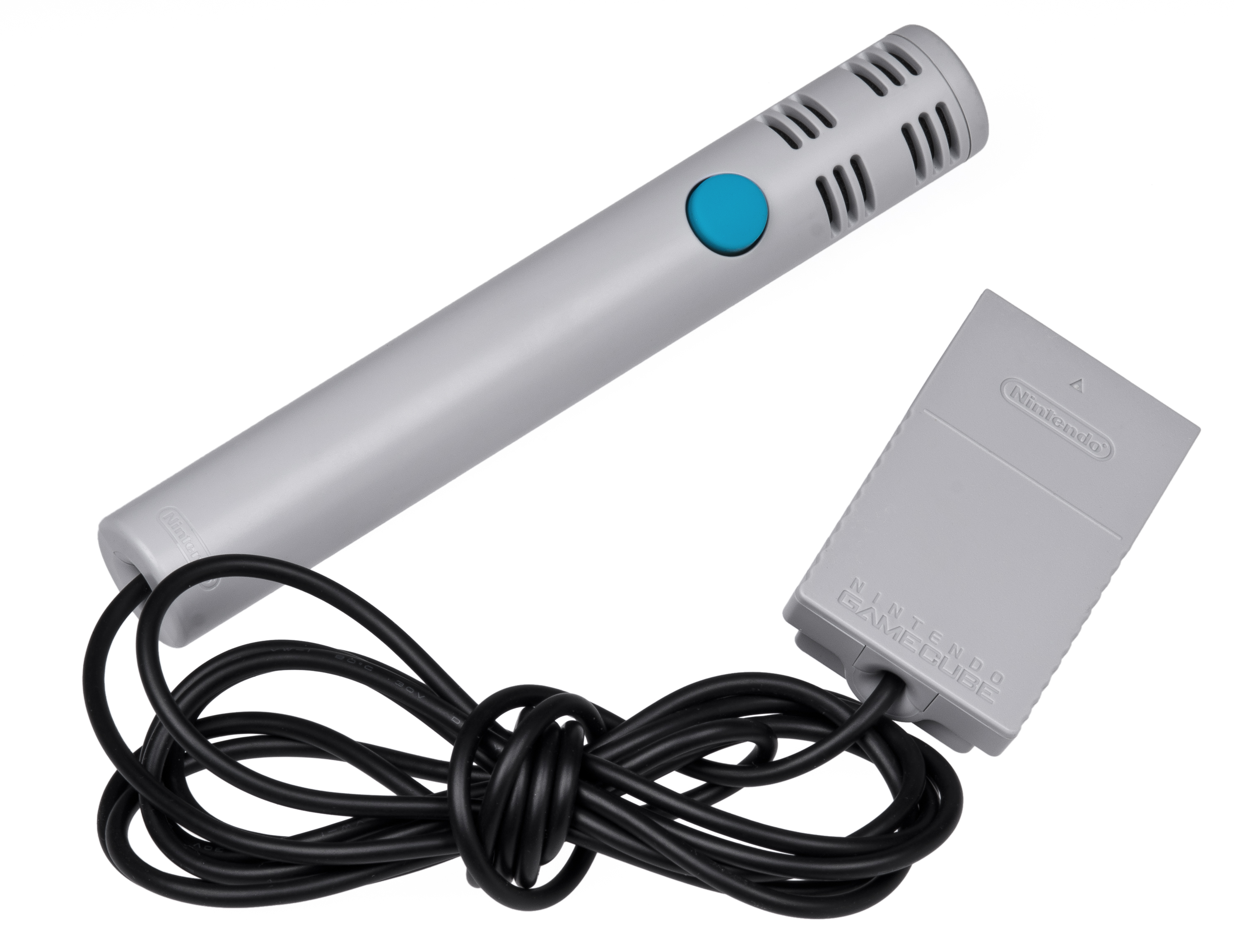
Like Mario Party 6 (2004), Mario Party 7 makes use of the GameCube Microphone in multiple minigames.

The Minigame Cruise game mode allows players to choose from any minigames that have been unlocked. In addition to a "free play" mode, wherein players can freely select which minigames to play, there are games with varying rulesets. For instance, Volcano Peril revolves around players competing to win three, five, or seven minigames before their opponents, while Waterfall Battle involves players competing exclusively in Duel minigames. Mario Party 7 features a total of 88 brand-new minigames, divided into nine types: 4-Player, 1-vs.-3, 2-vs.-2, Battle, Duel, 8-Player, DK, Bowser, and Rare. Eleven minigames can be played with the console's microphone. Minigame controls range from pressing a button repeatedly to using the control stick and at least one button. The objective(s) of each minigame also vary drastically; for instance, one minigame features characters racing against DK to the top of the level while jumping over barrels, akin to Donkey Kong (1981). Both Rare minigames must be purchased in-game to be unlocked.

A series first, Mario Party 7 features game modes and minigames that involve up to eight players. In the Deluxe Cruise mode, players can choose from any of the eight-player minigames or compete in all of them. There are 12 eight-player minigames, in which players are split into teams of two and are required to share a controller. Another new addition in this game is "Bowser Time!", an event that occurs every five turns during a Party Cruise match. After each minigame, the meter on the screen increases, and when the meter is full, Bowser appears and hinders the players, such as by taking Stars or coins from them. Sometimes, Bowser may replace an orb shop with a shop that sells players useless and expensive items. Bowser also appears during an event known as "The Last Four Turns", in which he provides an update on the current standings and adds a random rule, such as tripling the number of coins gained or lost by landing on certain spaces, giving the player in last place 40 coins, or reducing the price of Stars. Additionally, there are spaces on each board that can initiative a Bowser minigame, with a loss potentially resulting in a deduction in coins.

Mario Party 7 also features a system known as "Cruise Mileage points", which can be earned from playing through any of the game modes and used at the Duty-Free Shop to purchase various collectibles, including Rare minigames, new playable characters, and character figurines. One Cruise Mileage point is awarded per space advanced on a game board. At the Duty-Free Shop, players can view game mode and minigame records, as well as listen to in-game music and character voices.

== Plot ==
While taking his morning walk, Mario runs into Toadsworth, who informs him that he is planning a luxury cruise around the world and invites Mario to come along. Excited by this news, Mario accepts the invitation and goes to spread the word about the trip. Bowser later finds out about this and is furious about not being invited, so he and his sidekick, Koopa Kid, plot revenge.

During the game's single-player campaign, the player progresses through every stop by collecting more Stars than another player on each board: Grand Canal, Pagoda Peak, Pyramid Park, Neon Heights, and Windmillville. Once all of these boards have been cleared, Bowser invites the player to the sixth and final board, Bowser's Enchanted Inferno.

In the final board game, Toadsworth informs the player that they must collect a Star in order to confront Bowser. After collecting the Star, the player engages in a final boss minigame against Bowser, who is defeated and ends up stranded on a small island with Koopa Kid. As the player mocks him in the distance, an angered Bowser vows revenge again.

== Development and release ==
Like all of its predecessors, Mario Party 7 was developed by Hudson Soft and published by Nintendo. Shuichiro Nishiya directed the game, Hiroshi Sato and Atsushi Ikeda were its producers, and Hironobu Yahata and Shinya Outouge were its composers.

A demo for the game was showcased at E3 2005, featuring six playable minigames, multiple playable characters, and both the four-player and eight-player modes. Juan Castro of IGN compared the game's aesthetics and gameplay to those of Mario Party 6 (2004). Nintendo of America revealed the game's North American release date in August 2005.

In October 2005, Nintendo of America announced that a new bundle including a GameCube, two controllers, a microphone, and a copy of Mario Party 7 would be made available in the United States on November 7, the same date of the game's release in North America. The bundle was priced at $99.99, while the game on its own cost $49.99.

Mario Party 7 was first released in North America on November 7, 2005, and was released in Japan three days later. The following year, the game was released in the United Kingdom on January 27 and in Europe on February 10.

Mario Party 7 was succeeded by Mario Party 8 for the Wii in 2007.

== Reception ==
=== Critical response ===
Reception

Aggregate score
Aggregator	Score
Metacritic	64/100

Review scores
Publication	Score
1Up.com	D+
Eurogamer	3/10
Game Informer	5/10
GameSpot	6.5/10
GameSpy	4/5
GamesRadar+	2.5/5
IGN	7/10
Nintendo World Report	8.5/10

Mario Party 7 received "mixed or average" reviews from critics, according to the review aggregation website Metacritic. Reviewers generally praised the eight-player mechanics and minigame selection, though felt that there was not enough new content overall to distinguish the game from the six previous home console installments, particularly Mario Party 6. Concluding his review for IGN, Matt Casamassina wrote: "Mario Party 7 is still entertaining, but I'd be a liar if I wrote that I'm not growing bored with new iterations of the same old formula."

Multiple critics praised the multiplayer game modes, including the content with eight-player support. Casamassina wrote that the multiplayer experience was "as robust and enjoyable as ever" and praised the varying aesthetics and unique obstacles of the game boards. GameSpy's Dave Kosak referred to the board gimmicks as interesting, though criticized the pacing of the board games. Other critics similarly felt that the pacing was affected by having to wait for every player to take their turn, including computer-controlled characters, and advised competing only with human players. Critical response toward the single-player mode was less favorable, with Casamassina deriding this mode as "worthless" due to being "marred by tediously slow computer-controlled character interactions".

Reception toward the minigames was generally positive, with Nintendo World Report's Josh Daugherty lauding the selection as "the best to date", while Casamassina agreed that the minigames were usually enjoyable and served as the game's "main attraction". Russ Fischer of GamesRadar+ opined that the minigames were "[l]udicrously varied", with GameSpy's Dave Kosak adding that the minigames were well-crafted. However, some reviewers criticized the implementation of the microphone add-on in certain minigames, with Casamassina stating that its inclusion felt forced and unnecessary, while Eurogamer's Ellie Gibson noted inconsistency with commands being recognized. Miscellaneous criticism toward the minigames included some minigames ending too quickly, not being reliant on skill, or being too similar to those in previous installments. The requirement to unlock many of the minigames by playing through board games also elicited criticism, as did the infrequency with which minigames were played.

The game's emphasis on luck was generally criticized, including by Jared Rea of 1Up.com, who wrote that due to "the ridiculous amount of penalties across the boards, you never get a sense of accomplishment in your actions". Russ Fischer of GamesRadar+ added that although "the laying of traps can add a much-needed devious quality", they could easily get out of hand and make the game frustrating for losing players, in addition to padding out gameplay. Although Dave Kosak of GameSpy stated that the amount of blind luck involved could be frustrating, he added that it allowed anyone to play regardless of skill. The "Bowser Time!" event was particularly criticized, with Eurogamer's Ellie Gibson referring to the gimmick as "neither fun nor challenging".

The presentation was described as "colorful, chirpy and round" by Russ Fischer of GamesRadar+, who likened it to those of other Mario games on the GameCube. IGN's Matt Casamassina deemed the overall presentation "only passable", criticizing a lack of detailed facial animations or voice acting for characters during cutscenes. GameSpot's Ryan Davis noted "really, really colorful and jaunty tones" and described the sound design as "totally archetypal Mario, trotting out the same familiar sound effects, vocal quips, and musical accompaniments". Reviewing the game for The Globe and Mail, Chad Sapieha complimented the collectibles, though offered a less favorable response toward the audio and visual presentation, believing it to be largely unchanged.

=== Sales ===
As of 2006, the game had sold 1.86 million copies worldwide. As of December 31, 2020, worldwide sales had reached 2.08 million units, making Mario Party 7 the 11th-best-selling game for the GameCube.

== See also ==
- List of GameCube games
- List of party video games
- List of video games featuring Mario
- 2005 in video games
