= Aquatic Ambience =

Music theme from Donkey Kong Country

- Screenshot of Diddy Kong riding Enguarde in Coral Capers, a stage where Aquatic Ambience plays in Donkey Kong Country

Instrumental by David Wise
- Released: November 18, 1994
- Recorded: 1993
- Genre: Video game music, ambient music
- Composer: David Wise

Audio sample
- A 21-second excerpt from the original arrangement of "Aquatic Ambience".: file; help

"Aquatic Ambience" (also written as "Aquatic Ambiance") is a musical theme composed by David Wise for the video game Donkey Kong Country (1994). It plays in the underwater levels. It has received acclaim and has been remixed numerous times.

== Composition ==
Wise initially worked as a freelancer and assumed his music would be replaced by a Japanese composer because of the importance of Donkey Kong to Nintendo. Rare asked Wise to record three jungle demo melodies, which were merged to become the "DK Island Swing", the first level's track. Wise was subsequently offered the job to produce the final score.

According to Wise, he "just [took] eight waveforms and played them in sequence and that first experiment became the baseline for 'Aquatic Ambiance'". The song took five weeks to compose and Wise used a Korg Wavestation. He said the track was his favorite and the game's biggest technical accomplishment in regards to the audio.

Rearrangements of "Aquatic Ambience" appear in Donkey Kong Country Returns (2010) and Donkey Kong Country: Tropical Freeze (2014).

== Reception and legacy ==
In 2016, Ignatiy Vishnevetsky of The A.V. Club described the song as "a placid piece of music that uses a sophisticated palette of synthesized instruments and futuristic sound effects to create a mood of calm that's very different from the sped-up themes usually associated with platform games", being "more nocturnal and urban than submarine". He said that the song could be better appreciated "without a controller in hand", something that he considered rare, and that Wise seemed to be the only one that "managed to get as much texture and ambiance out of Super Nintendo's S-SMP sound chip" as he did.

"Aquatic Ambience" has been particularly influential. It has been described as "the 'Eleanor Rigby' of video game music", praised by artists such as Trent Reznor and Donald Glover, and Vishnevetsky of The A.V. Club wrote that it spawned a "minor cult" dedicated to remixes. Glover sampled it in his 2012 song "Eat Your Vegetables", to which Wise expressed approval. In 2016, it was remixed for a video game music award. River Boy, the composer of the Cult of the Lamb soundtrack among others, rated it as his favourite game soundtrack. He praised the technical complexity and tone, adding it implied that "the characters are contemplating the meaning of monkey existence and their place in the universe." Scizzie's version, released in 2022, brings a modern, ambient twist to this nostalgic melody, blending the old with the new. This remix was used widely within nostalgia themed TikTok videos in the 2020s, mostly for children who lived during the 1990's to 2000's.

The track, along with the rest of the Donkey Kong Country soundtrack, was part of the launch lineup with the Nintendo Music application in October 2024.
