= Kudaai =

Fire-spirit in Yakut mythology

Kıdaai Maqsin (Kudai Bakhsi) or Kudaai Bakhsilaan is a fire-spirit in Yakut mythology. He was the first blacksmith and the originator of ironworking. He lives in an iron house surrounded by flames.

K'daai is said to possess curative powers. In Yukut epics he heals the broken bones of heroes and tempers the souls of shamans.

Chyky, another famous Yakut smith, is not the same as K'daai. Chyky not only makes excellent weapons, but gives wise advice as well.

== In popular culture ==
- Kudaai appears in the video game Cult of the Lamb in the form of a blacksmithing duck, providing the protagonist with new weapons.
- The K'daai fire spirits from Warhammer Fantasy Battle are named after Kudaai.
