= Narayana Johnson =

Australian musician

River Boy
- Born: Narayana Johnson
- Origin: Murwillumbah, Australia
- Died: c. March 30, 2025
- Genres: Electronic music; Dubstep; Trip hop
- Instruments: Bansuri, synthesizer, guitar
- Years active: 2011–2025
- Formerly of: Willow Beats
- Website: narayanajohnson.com (archived)

Narayana Johnson, better known by his stage name River Boy, was an Australian composer. He was known as part of the musical duo Willow Beats, and as the composer of several video games including Cult of the Lamb. He received numerous accolades for his work including a Music Victoria Award (with Willow Beats) in 2018 and a World Soundtrack Award in 2023. His final composition project, Cult of the Lamb: Woolhaven was completed posthumously and released in 2026.

== Early life ==
Johnson was born in Murwillumbah, New South Wales and raised as a Hare Krishna. He was the son of Wally Johnson, a musician who wrote "Give Me a Home Among the Gumtrees" in 1974. Narayana was six years old when his father died, and this prompted the family to begin traveling. With Naranaya being home-schooled, they spent time in Singapore and travelled the United States among other countries. Their nomadic lifestyle led to Johnson developing a close friendship with his niece Kalyani Ellis, who was also a child during these travels.

== Career ==
=== With Willow Beats (2011–2018) ===
Narayana Johnson had intended to pursue a career as a guitarist from a young age. However, he broke his wrist while studying guitar at university, and had to drop out of his course. He elected to switch into composition, and at his teacher's prompting purchased a microphone and had Ellis sing over one of his songs. The two rose to prominence through Triple J Unearthed, a digital radio station which specializes in independent Australian artists. They won the service's Parklife competition in 2012, which led to them performing live at the event.

They released three EPs in the mid-2010s via Bandcamp and toured the east coast of Australia and New Zealand. Across their various tours, they supported Tash Sultana, Flume and Alison Wonderland. In 2017 they released their only full album Be Kind to Yourself and performed at Splendour in the Grass. The duo went on indefinite hiatus from 2018, with their final performances taking place in Sydney and Melbourne that July. Johnson stated that the two of them needed "some time to work on our art and selves." Shortly after disbanding the two were awarded the Archie Road Foundation Award for Emerging Talent at the Music Victoria Awards.

=== Video game soundtracks (2018–2025) ===
Johnson adopted the moniker "River Boy" for his solo work. He had earlier met Julian Wilton, the creative director for Massive Monster, during a Willow Beats tour. After learning that Wilton was involved in the games industry, Johnson offered to soundtrack a game and went on to record a few songs which would be used for Unicycle Giraffe (2019). Shortly after Willow Beats went on hiatus he was approached by Wilton again about composing for a then-unnamed console title which would become Cult of the Lamb; Johnson agreed.

Johnson was given a large amount of creative freedom on Cult of the Lamb, and was repeatedly asked to "just do you" by the team as Johnson's style was already fitting the theme of the game. He would go on to become the studio's audio director, working on sound effects and voice in addition to the game's music. He described a need to bring more energy to the music at times, as his music was sometimes too laid back for the action sequences and needed reworking. The game's soundtrack was well received; he was awarded the Game Music Award at the World Soundtrack Awards in 2023 for his work on the game. The game also won the Excellence in Music category at the Australian Game Developer Awards.

In 2022, Johnson also collaborated with several indigenous artists to support Yawa, a small game made for Clarendon Street Arcade in association with the Royal Melbourne Institute of Technology. He joined the project about two weeks before launch to compose music, handle adaptive audio, and record sound effects. The game was inspired by Gauntlet (1985), but was nonviolent and designed to teach the Boonwurrung language. It was playable as part of an installation at the arcade from July to October 2022.

Johnson continued working with Massive Monster, creating audio for the Cult of the Lamb content updates and performing the music live at events. This included a performance with Orchestra Victoria in October 2023 which drew 6,000 attendees, He also performed a rave version at Pax Australia 2024. In 2024, the studio also released Hymns of the Unholy, a heavy metal remix album of the game's score. The album included vocals from Howard Jones and Matt Heafy, guitars by Scott LePage and Clay Gober of Polyphia, Javier Reyes of Animals as Leaders, Josh Baines of Malevolence and Sean Long of While She Sleeps.

== Death and legacy ==
Johnson's death from an undisclosed cause was announced by Massive Monster on April 3, 2025. His death was marked by tributes from across the industry, and from within the Cult of the Lamb fandom. In Melbourne, local radio station 3RRR aired a two-hour mix of his work, playing tracks from across his career. The broadcast was part of the late night show REPRESENTED, which aims to spotlight artists from under-represented groups.

His death occurred mid-way through production of Cult of the Lamb: Woolhaven, leaving much of the music in place but some unfinished. He had earlier brought Ray Vavasis, an Australian singer/songwriter also known as Arrowbird onto the project. In the wake of Johnson's death, Arrowbird took over audio production and sought to complete the soundtrack using the material Johnson had left behind. This included completing stings and cutscene music by repurposing unused samples from Johnson including musical fragments, flute and voice work. The studio also hired his niece and former Willow Beats member Kalyani Ellis to compose music for a new minigame. The resulting soundtrack for the expansion, which released in January 2026, has been described as a "mixtape of his life".

A River Boy follower was also added to the game as a tribute. Upon meeting the lamb, he says "It's good to spend time in nature. We all go back there, in the end."

== Style and influences ==
Johnson struggled to place a genre label on his work, instead saying that it was simply "part of that beat movement that's happening at the moment in Australia." His work with Willow Beats was described as "electronic music, glitchy dubstep and chilled-out trip hop". He would use a mixture of synthetic instrumentation, with samples of his Bansuri flute, vocals and nature recordings. A 2017 Willow Beats music video for example included early morning bird sounds, achieved using a recorder taped to a bamboo pole. He described his process as one of playing his instruments for long periods of time and then finding short samples from within those recordings to manipulate.

Johnson described a range of inspirations on his music, including Hindu mythology from his upbringing and the landscape of the Tweed Valley where he grew up. He cited the musicians Mount Kimbie, The Knife, Rusko and FlyLo as musical influences. For video game soundtracks, he also cited influence from Game Boy titles he had in his childhood, including The Legend of Zelda: Link's Awakening and Pokémon Red Version. He also discussed David Wise's score for the SNES title Donkey Kong Country, in particular the underwater levels' track Aquatic Ambience. On a technical level, Johnson was also inspired by Hades' use of adaptive music to provide dramatic finishes at the end of boss fights, regardless of where in the track the player was at the moment of victory.

== Discography ==
=== with Willow Beats ===
- Willow Beats (EP, 2012)
- ALCHEMY (EP, 2013)
- water (EP, 2014)
- Be Kind to Yourself (2017)

=== Game soundtracks ===
- Unicycle Giraffe (2019)
- Yawa (2022)
- Cult of the Lamb (2022)
- Cult of the Lamb: Hymns of the Unholy (EP, 2024)
- Cult of the Lamb: Woolhaven (2026)
