= The Adventure Pals =

2018 video game

- Developer: Massive Monster
- Publisher: Armor Games
- Producers: Harry Armstrong; Derek A. Huffman
- Designers: Jay Armstrong; Jake Walder; Bretton Hamilton; Shane McCartney; Joshua Bentley-Allen; Lee Davies
- Programmer: Jay Armstrong
- Artist: Julian Wilton
- Writers: Dora Breckenridge; Jay Armstrong
- Composer: Ed Budden
- Platforms: Xbox One, Steam, PlayStation 4, Nintendo Switch
- Release: April 3, 2018
- Genre: Platform
- Modes: Single-player; Multiplayer

The Adventure Pals is a platformer video game developed by Massive Monster, being the first game developed by the firm. It was released on the Nintendo Switch, Xbox One, PlayStation 4, and PC on April 3, 2018.

== Gameplay ==
The Adventure Pals is a platform game with a kawaii-esque artstyle resembling those of Pendleton Ward. The player controls Wilton, a young adventurer who can jump, wall-jump, and attack enemies using his sword. Wilton is assisted by a pet giraffe named Sparkles, who can slow Wilton's descent by spinning her tongue like a propeller and latch onto red spheres to fling Wilton in the direction she is facing, and an anthropomorphic rock named Mr. Rock, who functions as Wilton's tactician. By defeating enemies, Wilton will gain experience points that allow him to level up after his EXP meter is completely filled; upon leveling up, the player must choose any one of up to three upgrades to provide Wilton and his friends with. The game also allows for drop-in/drop-out co-op, where the second player plays as a palette swap of Wilton.

There are a grand total of twenty-six levels in the game, with six levels in the first four worlds, and two levels in the fifth and final world. The compulsory levels in each world each contain a goal collectible known as a Ruby, which the player must collect enough of in any given world to unlock the boss level in said world. Though the entire game is structured linearly, the player may complete the first five levels in the first four worlds in any order they wish, though the final world is the only world that has truly linear progression. Each world features a town-like setting, where the player can talk to NPCs and complete side missions for them in order to unlock levels. Each level also features five Cupcakes that the player can take to the Cupcake King for new hats for Wilton and new outfits for Mr. Rock, as well as one sticker that is added to a sticker album.

== Plot ==
Wilton is a child who lives in a lighthouse with both of his parents. On Wilton's birthday, his father gifts him with a giraffe, whom he names Sparkles. Suddenly Mr. B, an old friend of Wilton's father's, crashes the party, kidnaps Wilton's father, and knocks out Wilton.

Wilton explains the situation to his mother, who suggests that he find Rubies by exploring bandit camps and helping those he meets. Not long after, Mr. B invades the lighthouse and kidnaps Wilton's mother as well. As Wilton collects more Rubies and encounters Mr. B a third time, the latter reveals that he is after the Oopie-Doopie, a creature of "enormous power" that will give him the power to destroy friendship, and even tricks Wilton into finding it for him.

After Wilton rescues his mother, she converts the lighthouse into a rocket to allow Wilton to pursue Mr. B at his moon base. Mr. B attempts to create a monster out of the Oopie-Doopie to destroy friendship, but Wilton defeats the monster and rescues his father, and the two work together to defeat Mr. B. Afterwards, the goldfish on Mr. B's head is revealed to have been the true antagonist all along, and had been using Mr. B as a pawn the whole time; the goldfish uses a bomb in a last-ditch attempt to stop Wilton, but a redemption-seeking Mr. B dives in the way and endures the blast himself.

Wilton, his father, and Mr. B return to the lighthouse to celebrate their victory, and Wilton decides to move out to discover his true purpose while Mr. B expresses remorse over his actions. The goldfish then appears again and kidnaps Wilton's friend Mr. Rock, prompting Wilton and Sparkles to fight the goldfish again.

== Development ==
The game was crowdfunded via Kickstarter starting in July 2016. The game was eventually released on April 3, 2018.

== Reception ==
Reception

Aggregate scores
Aggregator	Score
Metacritic	(NS) 77/100
OpenCritic	68% recommend

Review scores
Publication	Score
Nintendo Life	8/10
Nintendo World Report	8.5/10

The Adventure Pals was met with generally positive reviews upon its release. Critics praised the platforming, accessibility for younger players, art style, and humor. It currently holds a score of 77 on Metacritic based on eleven reviews and held a score of 76.12% on GameRankings based on eight reviews. Fellow review aggregator OpenCritic assessed that the game received strong approval, being recommended by 68% of critics.

Ryan Craddock of Nintendo Life gave the game an 8/10, praising the platforming aspect as "tight and precise, yet relatively relaxed and easy-going on the whole" and also enjoyed the game's humor, despite criticizing the low framerate in the arena battles, concluding "A couple of little niggles stop the game from hitting the true heights that it deserves to reach, but we'd urge you to look past these and dive into the fun. If you're a fan of platformers and cute things, you need to play this game." Neal Ronaghan of Nintendo World Report gave the game an 8.5/10, similarly praising the platforming and charm, although levied minor criticism at the simplistic level design, concluding "Regardless of the overall simplicity or the uncomplicated design, The Adventure Pals is a really charming platformer that is a joy to play whether by yourself or with a friend in co-op. It's a lighthearted, jokey journey filled with a plethora of fun ideas that is eminently enjoyable, especially with a younger gamer."
