= List of cancelled Wii games =

The Wii is a video game console launched by Nintendo in 2006. After the lukewarm sales of their prior video game console, the GameCube, Nintendo decided to take a different approach with their next system. Rather than enter into a technical hardware arms race with competitors Sony and Microsoft, they opted for weaker hardware that emphasized the use of motion control through an unconventional controller known as the Wii Remote. While Nintendo found success with this approach, with a massive increase in hardware sales over the GameCube, the strategy did lead to complications on the software side of the business. Many games would be cancelled due to developers not being able to translate multiplatform releases to the weaker and different hardware. Additionally, its popularity made it difficult for publishers to get games to stand out at retail, and Nintendo's restrictive size limits on its downloadable WiiWare games complicated releases as well. This list documents games that were confirmed for the Wii at some point, but did not end up being released for it in any capacity.

== Games ==
There are currently 66 games on this list. (Note: This number is always up to date by this script.)

List of cancelled Wii games
Title(s)	Notes/Reasons	Developer	Publisher
100 Bullets	A video game adaption of the 100 Bullets comic book series was announced by Acclaim Entertainment for release on the PlayStation 2 and original Xbox. This version of the game was cancelled amid Acclaim's financial troubles in the mid-2000s. D3 Publisher obtained the rights to the franchise shortly after, and announced plans to release an unrelated game in the franchise for a variety of platforms, Wii included, though none of those versions ever materialized either. The comic's primary writer, Brian Azzarello, later explained that the developers had trouble translating the comic's story into the video game format.		D3 Publisher
Batman: Arkham Asylum	A version of the 2009 PlayStation 3, Xbox 360, and PC title was in development for the Wii. Outside development team Red Fly Games spent a few weeks getting a demo of the game up and running on Wii, but the game never progressed further or released. Video footage was shared by the team online in 2016.	Red Fly Studios	Warner Bros. Interactive Entertainment
Blitz: The League	Initially scheduled as a Wii launch title, the game was delayed, and eventually cancelled for the platform. PlayStation 2, Xbox, and Xbox 360 versions still released between 2005 and 2007.	Midway Chicago	Midway Games
Blue Steel (Superman)	A Superman game in development for the Wii, PlayStation 3, and Xbox 360 platforms in 2008. Initially intended as a tie-in to a proposed Superman Returns film sequel, the game had a troubled development period and had to be retooled when said film sequel was cancelled. In 2009, both Brash Entertainment and Factor 5 were shut due to the Great Recession, ending the game's development.	Factor 5	Brash Entertainment
Bomberman Blast: Battlefest	Versions for Wii, PlayStation 3, and Xbox 360 were announced, but only the Xbox 360 version was released.	Hudson Soft	Hudson Soft
Bonk: Brink of Extinction	A downloadable revival of the Bonk series was planned for release on PlayStation 3, Xbox 360, and Wii, but was cancelled in 2011 when Hudson Soft was closed down.	Pi Studios	Hudson Soft
Brütal Legend	A version of the 2009 PlayStation 3, Xbox 360, and PC title was in development for the Wii. Rumors arose of both internal and external teams working on porting the game to the Wii's weaker hardware, but the port was never released.	Double Fine Productions	Electronic Arts
Call for Heroes: Pompolic Wars	A version of the 2007 PC title was in development for the Wii across 2007 and 2008, but never materialized. While no reason was cited, the PC version received very negative review scores from mainstream publications.	Quotix Software	Data Design Interactive
CCTV	The game's premise was to have the player be a security guard tasked with monitoring a CCTV. The game was cancelled when the developers could not find a publisher that supported its unique concept.	Nikitova Games	
Civilization Revolution	A year into the development of the PlayStation 3 and Xbox 360 versions of the game, a Wii version was announced as well. However, assets created did not translate well to the Wii's hardware, and the Wii version's development was later halted while the team finished up the other versions. While the developers stated that they had no intentions of "turning [their] backs on it", the Wii version never released.	Firaxis Games	2K Games
ClayFighter: Call of Putty	A revival of the ClayFighter series was announced for release via WiiWare and DSiWare, but never came to fruition.	StudioBlack Games	Interplay Entertainment
Crazy Garage	A game set in a car repair shop planned for release in Q3 2009. In August 2009, White Birds said the title would be completed "in the next few weeks". However, quarterly reports of publisher Playlogic successively list later release dates. In Q1 2010, Playlogic was in default on multiple development contracts and filed for bankruptcy later that year.	White Birds Productions	Playlogic Entertainment
Dead Space 2	A version of the 2011 PlayStation 3, Xbox 360, and PC title was in development for the Wii. Three months after its release on other platforms, the Wii port was cancelled, for the companies to focus on other projects instead.	Visceral Games	Electronic Arts
Dirty Harry	A video game continuing the story of the 1971 film Dirty Harry was announced in 2005, and was set to feature Clint Eastwood reprising his role as Harry Callahan. While planned to launch on multiple systems in 2007, including the Wii, the project was cancelled that year due to development issues.	Sensory Sweep Studios	Warner Bros. Interactive
Doodle Hex	A few months prior to the release of the Nintendo DS version of the game, a Wii version was announced. The DS version involved fighting characters through use of drawing shapes with the stylus and touch screen of the DS, something the developers were planning on recreating with the Wii Remote's motion control. However, only the DS version ever materialized.	Tragnarion Studios	Pinnacle Software
Dragon's Crown	The game experienced a long development schedule across many differing forms, including early versions for the Dreamcast and the Wii, though development cased during this time due to developer Vanillaware struggling to find publishers to financially support the project. The game released years later in 2013 for the PlayStation 3 and PlayStation Vita.	Vanillaware	
El Tigre: The Adventures of Manny Rivera	Based on the animated series of the same name, the project was originally given 12 months for development, only to be drastically cut down to 10 weeks after the show's abruptly cancellation. This led to the PlayStation 2 version being rushed to completion by significantly shortening the game, along with the Wii version's cancellation.	Blue Tongue Entertainment	THQ, Nick Games
Explodemon	Originally announced for the Wii, PlayStation 3, and Windows in 2009, the Wii version never materialized, while other versions released in 2011.	Curve Studios	Curve Studios
Family Guy: Back to the Multiverse	Versions for the Wii and the Nintendo 3DS were originally in development, but cancelled to consolidate development efforts on one standardized version of the game, as both the Wii and 3DS version would have needed to be different to run on their respective hardware.	Heavy Iron Studios	Activision
Foodfight!	A 3D platformer based on the animated film Foodfight! was being developed for Wii, PlayStation 2, Xbox, and Nintendo DS. The game began development in 2004 and was publicly shown at E3 2006. However, due to the film's repeated delays and infamously troubled production cycle, the decision was made to cancel the game in 2008, four years before the film would eventually be released.	Cat Daddy Games	Global Star Software
Garfield Gets Real	A video game adaption of the film of the same name, a Wii version was in development, but was cancelled, leaving only a Nintendo DS release in 2009.	Gravity-i	Zushi Games
God: The Game	A god game in development for the Wii, little was revealed about the game, and it was eventually cancelled due to the financial difficulties publisher THQ suffered in the early 2010s.	Big Huge Games	THQ
Gray Matter	A Wii version was planned as of 2009, but was absent when the Xbox 360 and PC versions were released in 2011.	Wizarbox	dtp entertainment
Tom Clancy's H.A.W.X	A Wii version was announced, but never released, with versions for PlayStation 3, Xbox 360, and PC and mobile platforms releasing in 2009.	Ubisoft Bucharest	Ubisoft
Icarus	Developer Factor 5 pitched a sequel to Nintendo's Kid Icarus series on the Wii, which included an older, more mature version of protagonist Pit. A prototype was created, but the pitch was rejected by Nintendo, who instead chose the direction of Sora Ltd's Kid Icarus Uprising (2012) instead.	Factor 5	Nintendo
Kid Icarus Uprising	Development for the game began in 2009 for the Wii, before being heavily reworked for release on the Nintendo 3DS, where it eventually released in 2012.	Sora Ltd	Nintendo
Lazy Raiders	Originally in development for the Wii and Xbox 360, the Wii version was cancelled when the development team struggled to create a game that could appeal to the casual Wii userbase and more hardcore Xbox userbase.	Sarbakan	Nintendo
Machinarium	Released via digital distribution across many console, PC, and mobile platforms, the announced Wii version was eventually cancelled in 2011, due to the developers being unable to fit the game's data size within WiiWare's small data size limits for downloadable titles.	Amanita Design	Amanita Design
Medal of Honor: Airborne	Originally announced as a cross-generational title that would have two versions: a full-fledged HD version on PlayStation 3, Xbox 360, and PC platforms, and a second, scaled back version developed for the less powerful hardware of the Wii, PlayStation 2, and original Xbox. The scaled back version was cancelled for all three platforms, Wii included.	EA Los Angeles	Electronic Arts
Untitled Metroid game	The 2020 Nintendo data leak revealed plans for Nintendo developer Intelligent Systems to develop a game in the Metroid series for the Wii — a studio whose last involvement in the franchise was 1994's Super Metroid. The game was never publicly announced and never materialized.	Intelligent Systems	Nintendo
Metroid Tactics	A game pitched by Metroid Prime developers at Retro Studios after completing Metroid Prime 3 as a new direction to head into following the conclusion of the Metroid Prime trilogy. It was proposed to feature similar gameplay to the XCOM series of video games, and would reuse assets from the Prime trilogy. However, management at Retro Studios rejected the pitch.	Retro Studios	Nintendo
Mr. T: The Videogame	In 2009, ZootFly announced that they were planning to release a series of video games based on the Mr. T graphic novels, the first of which would be an action adventure game featuring Mr. T and Will Wright battling Nazis. However, no Mr. T games from ZootFly ever materialized.	ZootFly	
The Next Big Thing	A proposed hybrid video game that mixed racing, platforming, and trick performing. The game was cancelled when developer Pandemic Studios could not find a publisher, and the company shut down shortly afterwards.	Pandemic Studios	
Pikmin 3	Development for the game began as a Wii title in 2008, but its prolonged development timetable pushed the game into development for the Wii U, where it later released in 2013.	Nintendo EAD	Nintendo
Project H.A.M.M.E.R./Wii Crush	Announced at E3 2006 with a playable demo, the game's development was plagued by many creative disagreements between developers and producers as various attempts were made to resolve its gameplay issues. Before being cancelled altogether in 2009, one of these attempts saw the game retooled from its initial gritty art style and narrative focus, to a more cheerful and story-light title called Wii Crush.	Nintendo Software Technology	Nintendo
Puzzle Agent	A Wii version was announced alongside PlayStation Network, PC, and mobile platforms, but did not release alongside the other versions in 2010, and was confirmed to be cancelled in June 2011.	Telltale Games	Telltale Games
Rayman 4	A 3D platformer in the vein of Rayman 2 and Rayman 3 was in development in the early stages of the Wii's lifespan. Creator Michel Ancel became concerned that a traditional Rayman game was not a good fit for the Wii's motion control-based hardware, and the project was heavily retooled into the party game Rayman Raving Rabbids. In 2022, the source code of the original Rayman 4 work in progress content was anonymously leaked onto the internet.	Ubisoft	Ubisoft
Red Faction: B.E.A.S.T.	An entry of the Red Faction series of games being developed exclusively for the Wii's hardware. Publisher THQ's financial troubles caused them to close down developer Locomotive Games, leading to the game's cancellation as well.	Locomotive Games	THQ
Rock of the Dead	Originally announced as a Wii exclusive title, it was announced in August 2010 that the Wii version was dropped in favor of the PlayStation 3 and Xbox 360, for which it released later that year.	Epicenter Studios	Conspiracy Entertainment, UFO Interactive Games
Sadness	Announced in 2006 for the Wii, very little info or footage was released afterwards, and it was cancelled in 2010 when developer Nibris went bankrupt. Developers HullBreach Studios and Cthulhi Games teamed up to buy the rights and restart development for the Wii U in 2014, with a 2016 release target, but the game never materialized.	Nibris	
SBK-08: Superbike World Championship	A Wii version was announced alongside PlayStation 2, PlayStation 3, PlayStation Portable, Xbox 360, and PC versions, but was cancelled.	Black Bean Games	Milestone srl
Scalebound	A year after its E3 2014 announcement as an Xbox One title, director Hideki Kamiya revealed in an interview that the game started out as a Wii title in which the Wii Remote was used to direct and communicate with dinosaurs as a little girl character, as opposed to its current iteration as an action game with dragons and an older male character. Microsoft would announce the cancellation of Scalebound in 2017, with the game never seeing release on any platform.	PlatinumGames	
Shadows of the Damned	Well after its 2011 Xbox 360 and PlayStation 3 release, developer head Goichi Suda noted in passing that the game had started as a Wii game, but that version of the game was cancelled for reasons he would not elaborate on.	Grasshopper Manufacture	Electronic Arts
Son of the Dragon	A game in development for the Wii similar to the Castlevania games, the closure of publisher Gamecock Media Group left developer Renegade Kid without a publisher, leading to the game's cancellation.	Renegade Kid	Gamecock Media Group
Sonic Generations	Originally, a Wii version was in development alongside the home console PlayStation 3 and Xbox 360 versions, and the handheld Nintendo 3DS version. However, this Wii version was abandoned early on to focus development resources on the others, which all released on their respective platforms in 2011.	Sonic Team	Sega
Sonic the Hedgehog (2006)	The game was originally in development for all seventh generation consoles, though the Wii version was dropped because the team felt porting the game to the Wii hardware would not be possible within the required development timeframe. Instead, the development team was split in two, with half focused on releasing the Xbox 360 and PlayStation 3 version across 2006 and 2007, while the other half developed the original title Sonic and the Secret Rings for the Wii instead.	Sonic Team	Sega
Space Station Tycoon	A spiritual successor to Outpost Kaloki X scheduled for release on the Wii and PlayStation Portable, the game missed its scheduled release date of August/September 2007, never received a new release timeframe, and never released for either platform.	Wahoo Studios	Namco Bandai
Sphere	An unannounced game by N-Space discovered in a widespread leak of Nintendo's data in 2021. Described as a Metal Gear Solid type game with a female protagonist, the game was never released in any capacity, and N-Space closed down in 2016.	N-Space	
Star Fox Zero	Nintendo development teams conducted internal tests on potential Star Fox game ideas on the Wii for years, but never came up with an idea that they felt worked well with the Wii hardware. Some ideas from those experiments were later used to create Star Fox Zero, which later released on the Wii U in 2016.	Nintendo EPD, PlatinumGames	Nintendo
Untitled Star Wars game (codenamed Damage internally)	A proposed Star Wars title for the Wii that would have involved exploring Darth Maul's origin story and using Wii Remote's motion control capability to simulate the use of a lightsaber. Discussions between LucasArts and Nintendo would have had Red Fly Studio, the company responsible for porting The Force Unleashed to the Wii, developing the title. However, Nintendo declined to fund the game as a first party game development project. While it was briefly pursued for other platforms, LucasArts eventually lost faith in the project and cancelled it. Years later, the developers attempted to revive it for the Wii U, but this never materialized either.	Red Fly Studio	LucasArts
Star Wars: Battlefront III	Following the release of Star Wars: Battlefront II (2005), Free Radical Design was contracted to develop a third entry in the series, with a focus on seamless movement from ground based combat to space battles. However, a change in leadership at LucasArts led to the publisher becoming dissatisfied with the project and withholding payments for six months, eventually resulting in the game's cancellation and Free Radical entering bankruptcy. A prototype for Xbox 360 was leaked in 2016, while a near-final Wii build of the game was uncovered in 2024.	Free Radical Design	LucasArts
Star Wars: Rogue Squadron: Rogue Leaders	A compilation of all three Rogue Squadron games — Star Wars: Rogue Squadron (1998), Star Wars Rogue Squadron II: Rogue Leader (2001), and Star Wars Rogue Squadron III: Rebel Strike (2003) — was developed and completed for the Wii, but went unreleased due to complications resulting from the 2008 financial crisis.	Factor 5	LucasArts
Super Mario 128	Initially debuted and demonstrated at the Nintendo Space World expo in 2000, the game was discussed for years without any further details. In 2007, Shigeru Miyamoto clarified that this was simply a tech demo, and its demonstrated ideas and concepts were instead implemented into other Nintendo titles such as Pikmin (2001) and Super Mario Galaxy (2007).	Nintendo EAD	Nintendo
Super Mario Spikers	After successfully developing a Mario sports adaption of soccer with Super Mario Strikers (2005), Next Level Games wished to development a new Mario game that would have been an arcade mashup of the sports of volleyball and wrestling. A pitch was financed by Nintendo based on the success of Mario Strikers Charged, but the Spikers pitch was ultimately not picked up.	Next Level Games	Nintendo
Super Meat Boy	Originally announced as a downloadable WiiWare game, but as development progressed, the game's filesize exceeded the small WiiWare game size limit, and was cancelled. The team briefly explored a physical retail release, but could not get support from publishers, who believed such a game would not do well at retail late into the Wii's lifespan. The game was later released on many console, PC, and mobile platforms, including Wii U and Nintendo Switch.	Team Meat	Team Meat
Summer Camp Showdown	Announced as Boys vs. Girls in January 2010 for release "this summer". A cover image and screenshots were published in May the same year, showing the game had been renamed to Summer Camp Showdown. SEC filings from January 2011 list the launch delayed to Q3 2011 but by March the game had been cancelled.	Digital Embryo	Majesco
Sword of Legendia	Originally announced at a 2006 pre-release event showcasing upcoming Japanese Wii games, its name and connection to Tales of producer Makoto Yoshizumi led many to believe it was a JRPG spinoff of Tales of Legendia, similar to Dragon Quest Swords. Little content was ever shown outside of some minor character concept art. Interviews with Namco staff showed that the game was considered to still be in development into 2008 and 2009, but had been cancelled before 2011.	Namco Bandai Games	Namco Bandai Games
Tecmo Bowl: Kickoff	A Tecmo Bowl remake was announced for both the Wii and the Nintendo DS. While the DS received Tecmo Bowl: Kickoff, the Wii version was cancelled in favor of Family Fun Football, a title that was thought to more closely cater to the Wii's casual userbase.	Polygon Magic	Tecmo
TimeSplitters 4	A fourth title in the TimeSplitters series was briefly in development for multiple platforms, including Wii. Development was halted due to Free Radical Design being unable to attract a publisher, with prospective publishers citing low sales of prior entries and their then-recently released Haze.	Free Radical Design	
Toot & Puddle: Call of the North	A video game based on the animated series Toot & Puddle was planned to release on the Wii in the third quarter of 2007 alongside a Nintendo DS game titled Toot & Puddle - An Artic Adventure, but both were cancelled and never released for unknown reasons.		Zoo Digital Publishing
A Vampyre Story	The viability of Wii and Nintendo DS ports were investigated, but never came to fruition.	Autumn Moon Entertainment	Crimson Cow, The Adventure Company
WiiWaa/WeeWaa	A game involving putting a Wii Remote inside a physical stuffed toy character to play, similar in concept to Babysitting Mama (2010). The game started development in 2008, but faced many hurdles with development and issues with Nintendo, who had strict rules about add-ons for the Wii Remote and use of the "Wii" branding in game titles, which led to the alternate name WeeWaa. The game was nearly finished and scheduled for a 2012 release, but lost publisher support due to the waning Wii userbase late in its lifecycle.	Zoink Games	
The Wonderful 101	Early plans for the game included releasing it on the Wii with existing Nintendo characters, though plans stalled and the game was put on hold. The game concepts were later revived as an original game with new characters for the Wii U and released in 2013.	PlatinumGames	Nintendo
WWE Brawl	A new WWE wrestling game, WWE Brawl, was announced in 2011 for release on PlayStation 3, Xbox 360, and Wii. Unlike THQ's annual WWE releases, Brawl was a spin-off intended to be a more fast paced party fighting game akin to Super Smash Bros. or Power Stone. However, the game was never released, presumably due to THQ's financial difficulties at the time. In 2024, a prototype of a previously-unknown Nintendo 3DS version was found and shared online.	Blue Tongue Entertainment	THQ
Young Justice: Legacy	The game's publisher cancelled the Wii and Wii U versions of the game, citing "quality issues" and "lack of interest at retail", though versions of the game still released in 2013 for Nintendo 3DS, PlayStation 3, Xbox 360 and Windows.	Freedom Factory Studios	Little Orbit, Warner Bros. Interactive Entertainment
Zoombies: Animales de la Muerte	First announced exclusively for WiiWare in 2008, this version was cancelled in 2011 when the developers failed to keep the game within the WiiWare size limits. While PlayStation 3 and Xbox 360 versions were announced as replacements, those too were cancelled, and the game only saw release for iOS mobile devices in 2013.	High Voltage Software	MTV Games
