= Wanted: Dead =

- Developer: Soleil
- Publisher: 110 Industries
- Director: Hiroaki Matsui
- Designer: Natsuki Tsurugai
- Programmer: Yoshihiro Ueno
- Artist: Koki Inoue
- Composer: Keiichi Sugiyama
- Engine: Unreal Engine 4
- Platforms: PlayStation 4; PlayStation 5; Windows; Xbox One; Xbox Series X/S
- Release: WW: February 14, 2023
- Genres: Action, hack and slash, third-person shooter
- Mode: Single-player

Wanted: Dead is a 2023 action video game developed by Soleil and published by 110 Industries. The game combines elements of third-person shooters and hack and slash genres, as players control a former convict who is let out of prison to perform high-risk missions for the police. It was released for PlayStation 4, PlayStation 5, Windows, Xbox One, and Xbox Series X/S on February 14, 2023. It received mixed reviews from critics.

== Gameplay ==
Players control Hannah Stone, a cyborg who has a life sentence commuted when she agrees to join an elite team that performs high-risk missions for the police. It combines hack and slash gameplay with that of third-person shooters. Players have access to a variety of weapons, including guns, swords, and grenade launchers. Players can do combos that involve both a sword and pistol. There are also cutscenes, some of which are done in anime style, and minigames, such as quick time events and elements of rhythm games. When players die, they restart the level via a checkpoint system. While progressing through the story, players can customize Stone via a skill tree.

== Development/Release ==
Developer Soleil is based in Japan. The Valhalla Game Studios team was merged with Soleil during the game's development. Valhalla was known for developing Devil's Third, published by Nintendo for WiiU. 110 Industries published Wanted: Dead for PlayStation 4, PlayStation 5, Windows, Xbox One, and Xbox Series X/S on February 14, 2023. Publisher 110 Industries is headquartered in Switzerland.

== Reception ==
Reception

Aggregate scores
Aggregator	Score
Metacritic	PC: 57/100; PS5: 57/100; XSXS: 61/100
OpenCritic	59/100; 20% Critics Recommend

Wanted: Dead received "mixed or average" reviews from critics, according to review aggregator website Metacritic.

GamesRadar said it has "trashy charm" and attempts to "subvert genre norms", but they felt it to be "bogged down by low production values, imbalance, and repetition". PC Gamer called it an "intentionally messy throwback" to the PlayStation 3 era. Though they felt it is "too janky" for mainstream gamers, they said a niche audience may enjoy it. Rock Paper Shotgun called it "a frustrating mess in almost every regard" and said it "doesn't know what it wants to be". Describing it as "one of the first big disappointments of 2023", IGN criticized what they saw as "shallow combat, dated presentation, and poorly balanced difficulty". Hardcore Gamer said it is a "modern take on third-person action games from the early 2000s" and, overall, "a punishingly-difficult bloodbath that's a joy to play".
