= Crosswords DS =

2008 video game

- North American box art
- Developers: Nuevo Retro Games; Nintendo Software Technology
- Publisher: Nintendo
- Platforms: Nintendo DS, Nintendo 3DS
- Release: NA: May 5, 2008; AU: June 12, 2008; Crossword Collection: AU: December 17, 2009; EU: December 18, 2009; Crosswords Plus; October 1, 2012
- Genre: Puzzle
- Mode: Single-player

Crosswords DS (stylized as CrossworDS and known as Nintendo Presents: Crossword Collection in PAL regions) is a puzzle video game developed by American studio Nuevo Retro games and released by Nintendo for the Nintendo DS handheld video game console. It was previously released in Australia as CrossworDS but a new OFLC entry confirmed that Nintendo Australia re-released it with a European localization. Crosswords DS features over 1,000 crossword puzzles that the player solves by using the stylus. Despite the title, it also features word search puzzles and anagram puzzles. It makes use of similar handwriting mechanics that the Brain Age titles make use of. Crosswords DS is included in the Touch! Generations series of titles, which includes such popular games as Brain Age: Train Your Brain in Minutes a Day! and Nintendogs. The background music was composed by Fabian Del Priore.

In 2012, Nintendo released a sequel for the Nintendo 3DS, titled Crosswords Plus.

== Gameplay ==
Crosswords DS supports up to four players, and features two basic modes - Training and Main Game. The main game includes three classifications of puzzles - Crosswords, Word Searches, and Anagrams. The game uses similar handwriting mechanics to solve the puzzles as the popular Brain Age series of video games, as well as requiring the player to hold the Nintendo DS like a book. All three puzzles have varying difficulty levels, all of them featuring unlockable puzzles and difficulty levels.

=== Crosswords ===
The crossword screen

The crossword puzzle is displayed on the touch screen and players tap tiles with the stylus to enlarge them, and then proceed to write in the desired letter. If a correct letter is written, it appears in black, and if an incorrect letter is written it appears in red. On higher difficulties, the player has the option to do the puzzle without the game showing if the letter is correct or not. A player can erase a letter or simply draw over it. The game will automatically move to the next tile after a correct letter, and will move either down or right, depending on which mode is toggled, across or down. Each puzzle also has a certain number of hint points that the player can use if stumped, but will also add a minute to the player's time. When a puzzle is completed the game will show the amount of time it took to complete, and give the player a grade.

=== Word searches ===
Word searches each have a certain category (i.e. "animals") that determine what kind of words the player will be searching for. Like a normal word search the word may appear forwards, backwards, or diagonally. The player touches the starting letter of the word, and drags the stylus to the ending letter of the word to highlight it. Once a word is found it is automatically crossed off form the word box on the left. The player's time is displayed, but no grade is given.

=== Anagrams ===
Anagrams give the player a certain number of letters, and the player must find every word that can be made out of the letters (2 letter words are not included). Players drag the letter tiles with the stylus into a box to make the words. When a word is found it will appear in its box on the top screen, listed in a group of how many letters the word is and alphabetically. When every word has been found, the player's time is shown, but like word searches, no grade is given. Anagrams comes in three difficulties: Short (4 letter words), Medium (5 letter words) and Long (6 letter words). Each difficulty awards you medals for completing 100, 200 and 300 anagram games. Each difficulty freezes the game once you have reached 583 anagrams of that difficulty.

== Reception ==
Crosswords DS

Aggregate score
Aggregator	Score
Metacritic	67/100

Review scores
Publication	Score
1Up.com	B−
GameDaily	8/10
GameSpy	1.5/5
GameZone	7.5/10
IGN	8/10
NGamer	51%
Nintendo Life	7/10
Nintendo World Report	9/10
Official Nintendo Magazine	70%
PALGN	7/10

Crosswords DS received average reviews according to the review aggregation website Metacritic. Matt Casamassina of IGN cited the number of crossword puzzles available and the control scheme as highlights, as well as the low price of the game. Some criticisms were the lack of any "bells and whistles" or downloadable content.

=== Awards ===
The game was awarded the Best Puzzle Game on the Nintendo DS in IGN's 2008 video game awards.

== Sequel ==
In October 2012, Nintendo released a sequel for the Nintendo 3DS, titled Crosswords Plus.
