= Valhalla Game Studios =

Japanese-Canadian video game developer

Valhalla Game Studios International
- Formerly: Valhalla Game Studios Co., Ltd. (2008–2014)
- Type: Subsidiary
- Industry: Video games
- Founded: 2008 (as Valhalla Game Studios); November 26, 2014 (as Valhalla Game Studios International)
- Defunct: December 2021
- Fate: Merged into Soleil, Ltd.
- Headquarters: Vancouver, Canada; Tokyo, Japan (VGS Japan)
- Key people: Satoshi Kanematsu (CEO)
- Parent: Wake Up Interactive
- Subsidiaries: Valhalla Game Studios, Ltd. (VGS Japan); Valhalla Seven Ltd. Valhalla Networks Ltd. EIN Entertainment Ltd. Soleil Ltd.
- Website: Valhalla Game Studios International; VGS Japan

Valhalla Game Studios International Ltd. (Note: Japanese: ヴァルハラゲームスタジオインターナショナルリミテッド) was a video game development, entertainment and holding company.

It was founded in 2008 as Valhalla Game Studios Co., Ltd. (Note: Japanese: 株式会社ヴァルハラゲームスタジオ) in Tokyo, Japan. An international division was later founded in British Columbia, Canada, which acquired all intellectual property and shares of the original Valhalla Game Studios and other affiliates, effectively making them subsidiaries of the Canadian company. To differentiate, the original Valhalla Game Studios is alternatively referred to as VGS Japan. VGS Japan is best known for Devil's Third, their flagship title which went through a long development cycle.

Valhalla's parent company, Wake Up Interactive, was acquired by Tencent for $44 million in November 2021. The following month, Wake Up merged the staff and operations of Valhalla Game Studios into another subsidiary, Soleil Ltd., effectively closing down Valhalla.

== Staff ==
Valhalla was run by former Tecmo staff: Satoshi Kanematsu, who worked on Monster Rancher and Rygar, and Tomonobu Itagaki, a game designer known for his work on the Dead or Alive and Ninja Gaiden series.

== List of games developed by VGS Japan ==
Title	Publisher	Platform	Release	Additional details
Devil's Third	Nintendo	Wii U	2015	Former Development co-operation for Nintendo SPD
Devil's Third Online	Nexon	PC	2016	—N/a
Momotaro Dentetsu 2017: Tachiagare Nippon!!	Nintendo	Nintendo 3DS	2016	—N/a

== Projects ==
Since 2009, the company had been working on Devil's Third, a "hyper-violent shooter". Originally developed as a title for the PlayStation 3 and Xbox 360, the game was eventually developed exclusively for the Wii U. Following the closure of development partner THQ, intellectual property rights to Devil's Third were given back to Valhalla Game Studios. The game was re-announced by Nintendo at E3 2014; the title released in 2015. It received "generally unfavorable" reviews from critics, according to review aggregator website Metacritic. In November 2015, it was announced that Valhalla and Nexon would be releasing Devil's Third Online, a PC port of Devil's Third's multiplayer mode, as part of a partnership. The title would go into open beta in December in Japan and would release in the same region in late January. It was confirmed that features that were absent in the original, such as voice chat, would be added to Devil's Third Online. After a delay, the title released in Japan on June 8, 2016.

== Litigation ==
In November 2015, it was reported that Valhalla Motion Pictures was suing Valhalla Game Studios for trademark infringement, likely due to their similar name and logo.

On March 24, 2016, the United States Patent and Trademark Office denied Valhalla Game Studios' trademark registration on the grounds that there was likelihood of confusion between Valhalla Motion Pictures and Valhalla Games Studios' mark.

== See also ==
- Wanted: Dead
- Valkyrie Elysium
