= Crosswords Plus =

2012 video game

- Developer: Nintendo Software Technology
- Publisher: Nintendo
- Platform: Nintendo 3DS
- Release: NA: October 1, 2012
- Genre: Puzzle
- Mode: Single-player

Crosswords Plus is a Nintendo 3DS video game that was released on October 1, 2012 in North America. It is the sequel to the 2008 game Crosswords DS.

== Gameplay ==
Players can complete over 1,000 pre-packaged crossword puzzles, which are categorized into four difficulties (Easy, Medium, Hard, and Expert). Boxes are filled in with letters using a touch-screen interface. There is also a hint system, which can be used to provide the player with a clue or fill in letters or entire words. Players can use SpotPass or StreetPass to receive free additional puzzles. Other additional game modes are anagrams, word searches, and word of the day.

== Reception ==
Reception

Review scores
Publication	Score
Nintendo Life	6/10
Nintendo World Report	8/10

Joshi Shaan of Nintendo Life rated the game a 6/10, stating that "the game's biggest draw is the wide selection of puzzles", but criticizing it for its lack of new additions and changes from the original game. Giving the game an 8/10, Nintendo World Report's Neal Ronaghan praised the game's variety of puzzles, but criticized it for its faulty letter recognition. Amy Kraft of Wired described Crosswords Plus as one of several games "worth checking out", calling it a "serviceable game that provides a fun diversion for a wide range of people", and praising the fact that both she and her 7-year-old could find challenge in it.
