= Mario vs. Donkey Kong =

2004 video game

- North American box art
- Developer: Nintendo Software Technology
- Publisher: Nintendo
- Director: Yukimi Shimura
- Producers: Shigeki Yamashiro; Shigeru Miyamoto
- Designer: Wing S. Cho
- Programmer: Yoonjoon Lee
- Artist: Kunitake Aoki
- Composer: Lawrence Schwedler
- Series: Mario vs. Donkey Kong
- Platform: Game Boy Advance
- Release: NA: May 24, 2004; AU: June 4, 2004; JP: June 10, 2004; EU: November 19, 2004
- Genre: Puzzle-platform
- Mode: Single-player

Mario vs. Donkey Kong (Note: Japanese: マリオVSドンキーコング, Hepburn: Mario tai Donkī Kongu) is a 2004 puzzle-platform game developed by Nintendo Software Technology and published by Nintendo for the Game Boy Advance. The game is the spiritual successor to Donkey Kong, which was released in 1994 for the Game Boy.

The gameplay revolves around a combination of platform and puzzle elements. Players control Mario through small sets of challenges to find a key and rescue Mini-Marios from Donkey Kong.

Mario vs. Donkey Kong received positive reviews, particularly for its gameplay and graphics. It spawned a franchise of the same name with the first sequel, Mario vs. Donkey Kong 2: March of the Minis, released on Nintendo DS in September 2006. A remake for the Nintendo Switch was released in February 2024.

== Gameplay ==
A screenshot taken in World 1, set at the Mario Toy Company.

In Mario vs. Donkey Kong, the player assumes the role of Mario, who is pursuing Donkey Kong through a toy factory in order to retrieve several stolen Mini-Mario toys. The game, a puzzle platform game, plays similarly to the Game Boy Donkey Kong game, giving Mario a vast set of different athletic moves, including a handstand, a sideways somersault, and a triple jump, all of which can be used to maneuver platforming stages in various different ways. There are several different environments, ranging from a lava environment to the classic construction site, and there are five different types; in the first, and most common, Mario has to pick up a key and take it to the locked door, and then find and pick up the Mini-Mario toy at the end of the level. The second type is where Mario must guide six Mini-Mario toys to the Toy Box, while protecting them from dangerous environments. The third type is the boss level, where Mario must fight Donkey Kong in order to proceed to the next world. The fourth type is the Plus Level, where Mario must activate one Mini-Mario in the level, which is holding a key, and take it to the door. The Plus levels are overall designed to be more difficult than the main levels. The fifth type of level is the Expert levels. The Expert levels can be accessed after beating the main worlds, and after collecting enough stars in the main and Plus levels. In the Expert levels, Mario must get the key and lead it to the door, much like the main levels, but the Expert levels are the hardest levels in the game. Getting through the door beats the level in Plus and Expert modes, rather than sending Mario to a second part.

== Plot ==
Mario is the owner of Mario's Toy Company, a toy enterprise in which he sells a series of small wind-up toys called "Mini-Marios". After seeing a television advertisement for the Mini-Marios, Donkey Kong immediately falls in love with the toys and sets out to the toy store to get some for himself, only to find that they are sold out. Furious, Donkey Kong breaks into Mario's toy factory across the street and steals all of the Mini-Marios, prompting Mario to chase after Donkey Kong to get his toys back.

Mario travels in pursuit of Donkey Kong, rescuing the Mini-Marios and battling Donkey Kong several times along the way before retrieving all of the toys. Upon realizing that all the stolen toys are now gone, Donkey Kong kidnaps all of Mario's Toad workers and imprisons them on the tower of a big building. Mario climbs to the top of the tower, rescues the Toads, and battles Donkey Kong once more, after which Donkey Kong falls onto a truck containing a shipment of new Mini-Marios. Donkey Kong then promptly steals this set of toys as Mario pursues him once again to reclaim them.

Following another cat-and-mouse chase, Mario gets back all but six of the captured Mini-Marios, which Donkey Kong holds captive and guards with a large robot mech. Mario fights Donkey Kong one last time, destroying Donkey Kong's mech and finally getting back the rest of the toys. Upon noticing Donkey Kong upset, Mario decides to give Donkey Kong a free Mini-Mario toy. After finally getting what he has wanted all along, Donkey Kong, Mario, and the remaining Mini-Marios all rejoice together.

== Development ==
The game is an evolution of Donkey Kong Plus, a title on display at E3 2002. During the show, Plus had a feature that allowed players to design and save their own levels on the GameCube, then copy them to the Game Boy Advance using a link cable. It was essentially an updated version of Donkey Kong '94, but the game had disappeared by the following year. It was replaced with the pre-rendered graphics and gameplay additions of Mario vs. Donkey Kong. The Create-a-Level feature was removed from this version but appears in its sequel. The level editor still exists within the game's programming and can be enabled through a modification.

The game has hidden e-Reader support. Nintendo held a competition in Japan in which cards were distributed to 1,000 winning participants. Five level cards were released by CoroCoro Comic, and another card was given away at the 20th World Hobby Fair. The game can save up to 12 extra levels.

== Re-releases ==
Mario vs. Donkey Kong, as well as nine other Game Boy Advance games, was available to Nintendo 3DS owners who purchased their systems before the price cut on August 11, 2011, via Virtual Console as part of the ambassador program. This offer was available in all territories, and only to those who became eligible in the Ambassador program (by accessing the Nintendo eShop before the date of the price-cut). Although the game was released on December 16 the same year, to Ambassador users, Nintendo never released it to the general public in paid form on Nintendo 3DS. The game was added to Nintendo Classics on March 10, 2026.

== Reception ==
Reception

Aggregate scores
| Aggregator | Score | |
| Aggregator | GBA | NS |
|---|---|---|
| Metacritic | 81/100 (Note: Score based on 43 reviews) | 76/100 (Note: Score based on 104 reviews) |
| OpenCritic | | 69% recommend (Note: Based on 94 reviews) |

Review scores
| Publication | Score | |
| Publication | GBA | NS |
|---|---|---|
| Destructoid | | 7.5/10 |
| Digital Trends | | 3/5 |
| Edge | 7/10 | |
| Electronic Gaming Monthly | 7.33/10 | |
| Eurogamer | 8/10 | 4/5 |
| Famitsu | 30/40 | 32/40 |
| Game Informer | 7.5/10 | 8/10 |
| GamePro | 4.5/5 | |
| GameSpot | 8/10 | 7/10 |
| GameSpy | 3/5 | |
| GameZone | 8.5/10 | |
| IGN | 8.5/10 | 7/10 |
| Nintendo Life | | 7/10 |
| Nintendo Power | 4.5/5 | |
| Video Games Chronicle | | 3/5 |

Mario vs. Donkey Kong received "generally favorable" reviews according to the video game review aggregator website Metacritic. GameSpot named it the best Game Boy Advance game of May 2004. It received a runner-up position in GameSpot's 2004 "Best Puzzle/Rhythm Game" award category across all platforms, losing to Katamari Damacy. In March 2007, IGN listed it as #25 in their list of the top 25 Game boy Advance games of all time, calling it "a great game that fits the Game Boy Advance's pick-up-and-play environment since players could whip out the system, solve a puzzle, and put it away for later". The game sold 1.37 million copies worldwide.

== Remake ==
Mario vs. Donkey Kong
- Key art
- Developer: Nintendo Software Technology
- Publisher: Nintendo
- Director: Vivek Melwani
- Producers: Shinya Saito; Takao Nakano
- Designer: Philip Brodsky
- Artists: Brian McNeely; Erica Hanson; Marcos Gomes; Takashi Ogomori
- Composers: James Phillipsen; Eric Pansulla; Ina Almacen; Lawrence Schwedler; David Kitay
- Series: Mario vs. Donkey Kong
- Platform: Nintendo Switch
- Release: February 16, 2024
- Genre: Puzzle-platform
- Modes: Single-player, multiplayer

A remake of Mario vs. Donkey Kong was released on the Nintendo Switch on February 16, 2024. It was also developed by Nintendo Software Technology and published by Nintendo. It features enhanced graphics and local co-op multiplayer with Toad as the second player character. Players can select between two "Play Styles", Casual and Classic. Casual removes the time limit, adds checkpoints to levels, and lets Mario take five hits before losing a life, while Classic is akin to the original game. Two new worlds have been added: Merry Mini-Land, taking place in an amusement park, and Slippery Summit, an icy mountain. These worlds also receive Plus counterparts, making for 30 new levels, and pushing the total beyond 130. After finishing the game, "Time Attack" becomes available, challenging players to beat each level as fast as they can. This game was also the first Mario game to reuse Charles Martinet's voice as Mario after stepping away from the role in August 2023.

=== Reception ===
The Nintendo Switch remake also received "generally favorable" reviews, albeit lower than the original.

Video Games Chronicle felt that the majority of the game is "far too easy", with the only truly satisfying challenge to be found in the Expert levels, of which the critic said there could have been more in the game. Conversely, Destructoid said that the game was surprisingly "demanding" for a 2D Mario platformer, particularly the levels in which Mario must guide Mini-Mario toys to a Toy Box.

Game Informer and GameSpot both praised the controls. The former said that "it's a blast to move from one side of the stage to another" and the latter called the movement "natural" and "intuitive". While they said that it doesn't feel as good to play as other 2D Mario platformers, they acknowledged the need to make a moveset that can facilitate complex puzzles, and concluded that "it's a very well-made middle-ground".

Digital Trends lamented the exclusion of the original's e-Reader levels, the majority of which were never made officially playable. The "Time Attack" feature was also criticized, which functionally replaces the high score system from the 2004 release; the reviewer considered it "an attempt to squeeze more replay value" out of a short game with a high price tag. Eurogamer, on the other hand, praised the amount of content, calling it a "lovely package" that "unroll[s] before you".

=== Sales ===
The remake performed well commercially, topping the UK physical video game charts. As of March 2024, the game has sold 1.12 million copies, with 210,000 sold in Japan and 910,000 internationally.
