= Aura-Aura Climber =

2010 video game

- Developer: Nintendo Software Technology
- Publisher: Nintendo
- Director: Masamichi Abe
- Producers: Yukimi Shimura; Kensuke Tanabe
- Designer: Stephen Mortimer
- Programmer: Rory Johnston
- Artist: Kunitake Aoki
- Composer: James Phillipsen
- Engine: DSiWare
- Platform: Nintendo DSi
- Release: NA: February 22, 2010; EU: October 1, 2010; JP: November 10, 2010
- Genre: Action
- Mode: Single-player

Aura-Aura Climber is a 2010 action video game developed by Nintendo Software Technology and published by Nintendo for the Nintendo DSi's DSiWare digital download service.

== Gameplay ==
Aura-Aura Climber revolves around a fallen star called an "Aura-Aura" climbing back up into the sky. It does this by slinging its arm around pegs in the sky. Along the way, the player can collect items like bombs and extensions. The different modes of play include score attack, and endless. Players also dodge storms, hit switches, and collect bonuses.

== Reception ==
IGN's Lucas M. Thomas rated it 8/10, calling it "a nifty little design that's definitely helping redeem all those trashy releases still taking up the rest of the spots in the DSi Shop's 200 Point section". Eurogamer's Kristan Reed rated it 8/10: "Presented with all the audio-visual charm, there's much to admire", but "with only 10 levels, it's not a game destined to last long in the memory".
