= Mario and Donkey Kong: Minis on the Move =

2013 video game

- Logo
- Developer: Nintendo Software Technology
- Publisher: Nintendo
- Director: Stephen Mortimer
- Producer: Akiya Sakamoto
- Designers: Wing S. Cho; Hirokazu Yasuhara; Philip Brodsky; Christopher Polney
- Artist: Brian McNeely
- Composer: James Phillipsen
- Series: Mario vs. Donkey Kong
- Platform: Nintendo 3DS
- Release: WW: May 9, 2013; JP: July 24, 2013
- Genre: Puzzle
- Mode: Single-player

Mario and Donkey Kong: Minis on the Move, known in Japan as Mario & Donkey Kong: MiniMini Carnival (マリオ & ドンキーコング ミニミニカーニバル, Mario & Donkī Kongu MiniMini Kānibaru), is a 2013 puzzle game developed by Nintendo Software Technology for the Nintendo 3DS. The fifth entry in the Mario vs. Donkey Kong series, it was released exclusively via the Nintendo eShop download service on May 9, 2013, in the PAL region and North America, and on July 24 in Japan.

The game received positive reviews from critics, who praised its unique gameplay, puzzle design, and level editor. A sequel, titled Mario vs. Donkey Kong: Tipping Stars, was released for both the 3DS and the Wii U in 2015.

== Gameplay ==
Pictured are the basic elements of the game, including the Mini, starting and end points, and three coins which may be collected.

In the main game, the player must place blocks on a grid with the goal of making a path for a Mini—a small walking robot resembling Mario or another Mario series character—to travel from a warp pipe to a star goal, while avoiding obstacles such as spike pits and Shy Guys along the way. The player can complete the additional task of collecting three colored coins along the created path, which itself may require additional tasks, such as closing the Mini within a figure-eight loop. Players can tap the mini, which gives it a burst of speed. If the mini falls off the pathway, gets blocked, stays in the pipe after about 30 seconds, too many pieces fill the pipe, or if the timer reaches zero, the player fails the level. Collecting all three coins for a level earns the player a star token, which unlock additional gameplay modes, levels, and toys as they are amassed. There are more than 180 puzzles over four modes of play, as well as four minigames which can be unlocked.

Additionally, Minis on the Move featured a level creation mode with which the player could create custom levels using any and all pieces from the main game, as well as control the frequency of available falling tiles. Created levels could be saved and shared via StreetPass once the player was able to complete the created level. These levels could also be shared via Nintendo Network, where users could download other popular user creations. All online features were retired in April 2024.

== Development ==
Like the previous entries in the Mario vs. Donkey Kong series, Minis on the Move was developed by Nintendo Software Technology.

== Reception ==
Reception

Aggregate score
Aggregator	Score
Metacritic	78/100

Review scores
Publication	Score
Destructoid	9/10
Edge	7/10
Electronic Gaming Monthly	8/10
Eurogamer	8/10
Game Informer	6.5/10
GameRevolution	4.5/5
GameTrailers	8/10
GameZone	7.5/10
IGN	7/10
Joystiq	2.5/5
Nintendo Life	7/10
Official Nintendo Magazine	82%
Polygon	9/10
Digital Spy	4/5
Metro	8/10

Minis on the Move received "generally favorable reviews" according to the review aggregation website Metacritic. Most reviews cite the level creator as the most impressive element of the game. IGN's Lucas M. Thomas wrote that this feature extends the replay value significantly, though some (including Thomas) derided the limitation of randomly falling pieces in creating levels.

GamesMaster called the game "a breezy, if surprisingly brutal" puzzler in terms of gameplay. Tony Ponce of Destructoid appreciated the removal of the plot from the previous Mario vs. Donkey Kong games. Of the revised gameplay, he wrote that Nintendo decided to explore new avenues for the Minis, taking inspiration from Lemmings and railroad puzzles. Tom Sykes of Official Nintendo Magazine was positive to the game and suggested that both Pipe Mania and Tetris were positive inspirations for the gameplay in Minis on the Move, culminating in a cleverly realised and challenging set of wind-up puzzles.

Lucas M. Thomas was less favorable towards what he wrote is a Nintendo version of the old-school puzzler Pipe Mania. While derisive of the main game's "randomized tile dispenser", Thomas found the "Puzzle Palace" and "Many Minis Mayhem" modes as highlights of the game. Nintendo Life's Jon Wahlgren found that "every trick in the book is deployed" to create a "constant sense of urgency" with gameplay that is "a little unfair at times". He deemed "the secret best part" of Minis on the Move to be the minigame "Cube Crash", comparing it to Art Style: Cubello, but overall feeling it was a game that "doesn't really justify the move into 3D". Mike Suszek of Joystiq also compared the game to Pipe Mania, though "much more fleshed-out", while calling the minigames simply a "reason to look away from the touch screen". Suszek wrote in summation that the "challenge never materializes".

Chad Sapieha of National Post gave it a score of eight out of ten. Liam Martin of Digital Spy gave it four stars out of five, saying that despite a few minor complaints, largely concerning the bonus content, he called the title an abundant, accessible and entertaining puzzle game. David Jenkins of Metro similarly gave it a score of eight out of ten, calling it a welcome change of style for the puzzle series.
