= Mario vs. Donkey Kong 2: March of the Minis =

2006 video game

- North American box art
- Developer: Nintendo Software Technology
- Publisher: Nintendo
- Director: Yukimi Shimura
- Producers: Shigeki Yamashiro; Kensuke Tanabe
- Programmer: Yoonjoon Lee
- Artist: Kunitake Aoki
- Composer: Lawrence Schwedler
- Series: Mario vs. Donkey Kong
- Platform: Nintendo DS
- Release: NA: September 25, 2006; AU: January 18, 2007; EU: March 9, 2007; JP: April 12, 2007
- Genre: Puzzle-platform
- Mode: Single-player

Mario vs. Donkey Kong 2: March of the Minis (Note: Mario vs. Donkey Kong 2: The Great Mini Mini March (Japanese: マリオVSドンキーコング2 ミニミニ大行進!, Hepburn: Mario tai Donkī Kongu tsū Mini Mini dai Kōshin!)) is a 2006 puzzle-platform game developed by Nintendo Software Technology for the Nintendo DS. Serving as a direct sequel to the Game Boy Advance game Mario vs. Donkey Kong, the gameplay involves the player guiding several Mini Marios through platform stages with the touch screen as they attempt to defeat Donkey Kong. The game also marks the return of Pauline, who had not been seen since 1994's Donkey Kong.

March of the Minis received positive reviews from critics, with praise for its gameplay, level design, and control scheme, although some criticized its short length. A sequel, called Mario vs. Donkey Kong: Minis March Again!, was released in June 2009. In October 2016, the game was released on the Wii U eShop under the Virtual Console branding.

== Gameplay ==
Instead of controlling with the D-pad, Mario vs. Donkey Kong 2: March of the Minis uses the touch screen to control the Mini-Marios in the same vein as Lemmings. The object of the game is to get the Mini-Marios in each level to the door. The Mini-Marios have no concept of self-preservation, having no problem walking into spikes or lava, and as such the challenge comes from managing multiple moving toys on their way to the goal while avoiding their destruction.

To move, the player must use the stylus to turn a Mini-Mario's direction to move them in that direction. Swiping up enters pipes, climbs ladders, or makes them jump. Swiping across the Mini-Marios left or right causes them to move in that direction, and swiping down causes them to enter a pipe that is below their feet. Tapping once causes them to stop. The D-pad and the face buttons move the camera (i.e. X and Up move the camera up), and in DK stages pressing L and R causes a line to appear temporarily showing the path the launched Mini-Mario will take. The timer does not start until the player either moves blocks or taps a Mini-Mario, but the player may move elevators, change the direction of pipes or conveyor belts, and scout the level out without starting the timer.

The game consists of eight worlds, or floors, each with nine levels, or rooms, totaling 72 levels, or rooms altogether, a minigame, and a DK stage. In addition to these levels are the Roof, which consists entirely of the final DK stage, and the basement, which consists of two extra boss stages that are only accessible by earning 40 silver stars and 40 gold stars, totaling 80 stars altogether. When a chain of Mini-Marios enters the door at the end, a combo occurs, meaning 1000 for the first, 2000 for the second, 4000 for the third, etc. If the stage contains a Gold Mini-Mario and it is the end of the chain, the point bonus doubles. For instance, if there are two normal Mini-Marios and a Gold Mini-Mario in a stage, and they enter in that order, the points will go like this: 1000, 2000, 8000. At the end of every room, the player's score is tallied up with 100 points for each second remaining. The player may also earn any combination of three bonuses: All Minis, which means every Mini-Mario made it into the door; Perfect Chain, which means that there was no break between Mini-Marios entering the door; and Nonstop, which means that at least one Mini-Mario was not stopped by being tapped with the stylus (stopping on elevators or waiting for platforms don't ruin this bonus). There are three medals, or stars, that can be earned upon meeting their requirements: bronze, silver and gold.

In each room, there is a Mini Mario Card and coins. Collecting all nine Mini Mario Cards in a floor will spell out MINIMARIO and unlock that floor's minigame. The minigame involves tapping Mini Shy Guys as they come out of the Pipes and avoiding the Bob-ombs that will occasionally come out of the Pipes as well. Touching a Bob-omb in the minigame will have a result of the player losing five points. There are two types of coins: small and large. Small coins are worth 50 points and large ones are worth 500. Collecting coins helps in meeting the score required for a Gold Star.

The DK stages play a bit differently from the main game. In these stages the bottom screen shows a cannon loaded with a Mini-Mario, a belt upon which the cannon moves on, and a button labeled Shoot that the player must tap to fire the Mini-Mario. The top screen shows the player's remaining Mini-Marios, which depends on how many Mini-Marios the player led to the door throughout the entire floor, DK's remaining hitpoints, which always starts out at six, DK's location, and objects the player needs to hit with a Mini-Mario in order to damage him. If a Mini-Mario collides with DK's side, that will damage him as well. The only way to lose a Mini-Mario is if it is hit with an object or if DK breaks it. DK's movement varies with the stage. In some, it is similar to a shell game in that there are three locations he can appear and the player must predict where he will appear next based on a pattern. In the others, he is on a swinging platform. If a Mini-Mario collides with the swinging platform's spikes on the bottom of it, the Mini-Mario will break. Floor 8's DK Stage involves him moving between ropes like Donkey Kong Jr. does in Donkey Kong Jr. In Floor 8's DK stage, if a Mini-Mario collides with DK, the Mini-Bird, or any of the Mini-Snapjaws, the Mini-Mario will break. Once the player hits DK six times with Mini-Marios or any falling objects from the Mini-Marios, the stage ends and the score is tallied up with 100 points for each second remaining and 1000 points for each surviving Mini-Mario. The extra three DK stages are modeled after stages in the original Donkey Kong arcade game.

=== Construction Zone ===
March of the Minis incorporated a feature that was meant to be included in the cancelled Donkey Kong Plus. The player could create levels and upload them wirelessly or over the Nintendo Wi-Fi Connection for friends to play. For each floor completed in the main game, its corresponding kit was unlocked for use in the construction zone. In addition, when the player completed the minigames for the first 3 floors, 6 floors, and all 8 floors, Special Kits 1, 2, and 3 were unlocked, respectively. The player could save up to 8 of their own levels, and download up to 24 levels made by their friends. The special kits resembled the Pipe Works Kit, Toadstool Castle Kit, and Jungle Hijinks Kit, with similar music except for the first kit, which played a different version of the Mushroom Mayhem kit. Another difference is that the players could move Mini-Toad, Mini-Peach, and Mini-DK respectively, instead of a Mini-Mario.

All online features were retired in May 2014.

== Plot ==
March of the Minis opens with the grand opening for the "Super Mini-Mario World" amusement park based on the highly successful mechanical toys developed by the Mini-Mario Toy Company. Immediately following the ribbon-cutting ceremony, Mario presents his VIP guest Pauline with a Mini-Mario toy, while at the same time, Donkey Kong offers her a Mini-Donkey Kong toy. When Pauline chooses the Mini-Mario toy, Donkey Kong becomes infuriated and storms off with her to the roof. Mario, unable to follow, sends the Mini-Mario toys in pursuit to save Pauline.

The Mini-Mario toys work their way through eight floors, each with nine challenging rooms, confronting Donkey Kong on each floor. Eventually, Mario and the Mini-Mario toys reach the roof and defeat Donkey Kong. Afterwards, Mario is relieved to find Pauline safe and sound in a cozy room surrounded by presents (presumably from Donkey Kong in an attempt to impress her) and holding a cup of tea. Donkey Kong enters the room, feeling remorse for his behavior, and Pauline picks up a Mini-Donkey Kong toy and kisses it, making Donkey Kong feel better, knowing that she has forgiven him.

== Reception ==
Reception

Aggregate score
Aggregator	Score
Metacritic	76/100

Review scores
Publication	Score
Edge	7/10
Electronic Gaming Monthly	7.17/10
Eurogamer	7/10
Game Informer	6/10
GamePro	4.25/5
GameSpot	8.2/10
GameSpy	3.5/5
IGN	(UK) 8.2/10 (US) 7/10
Nintendo Power	7.5/10
X-Play	4/5
The Sydney Morning Herald	3.5/5

The game received "generally favorable" reviews according to video game review aggregator Metacritic. As of July 2007, the game has sold 1.24 million copies worldwide.
