= Devil's Third =

2015 video game

- Japanese and European cover art
- Developers: Valhalla Game Studios; Nintendo SPD (Wii U)
- Publishers: Nintendo; Nexon (Devil's Third Online)
- Director: Tomonobu Itagaki
- Producers: Yoshifuru Okamoto; Hitoshi Yamagami
- Designer: Katsunori Ehara
- Programmers: Takuro Sasaki; Tetsuo Yamamoto
- Artist: Hiroaki Matsui
- Writers: Go Bitou; Paul DeMeo
- Composers: Riichiro Kuwabara; Mike Reagan
- Engine: Unreal Engine 3
- Platforms: Wii U Windows (Devil's Third Online)
- Release: Wii U: JP: August 4, 2015; EU: August 28, 2015; AU: August 29, 2015; NA: December 11, 2015; Windows (Devil's Third Online): JP: June 8, 2016
- Genres: Action-adventure, hack and slash, shooter
- Modes: Single-player, multiplayer

Devil's Third (Note: Japanese: デビルズサード, Hepburn: Debiruzu Sādo) is a 2015 action-adventure game developed by Valhalla Game Studios and published by Nintendo for the Wii U. It was released in most regions in August 2015, and later in North America in December 2015.

An online multiplayer-only version for Windows, titled Devil's Third Online, was released in collaboration with Korean publisher Nexon in Japan in June 2016. The free-to-play Windows version also supported voice-chat, which the Wii U version lacked. The Windows version was discontinued in March 2017.

Despite receiving positive reviews in Japan, the Wii U version received negative reviews internationally upon release. Devil's Third was the final game directed by Tomonobu Itagaki before his death in 2025.

== Gameplay ==
While the camera is usually set to follow Ivan, the player character, the camera shifts into a first person perspective when aiming. Unlike many modern third-person shooters, it does not adopt an over-the-shoulder approach, instead opting for a more traditional camera that is directly behind the character, save for when ducking behind cover. Melee combat consists of chaining together a series of attacks, often followed with a cinematic takedown. In addition, melee weapons can be swapped, thrown at enemies, and stolen mid-counter.

It features online play and a means of reshaping the battlefield via a sort of level editor. It features three types of progression currency: Clan Funds, Dollen, and Golden Eggs. Among choosing sides in game modes, there is a third side known as the "Free Entry" option, which is said to be the option that would appeal to the Lone Wolf type of player. It is not clear as to what this actually does, but it is implied that "Free Entry" players fight as a third force that does not contribute to either team. On December 29, 2016, at 1PM Japan Standard Time, Nintendo shut down the servers for the Wii U version of Devil's Third.

== Plot ==
Following the dissolution of the Soviet Union, Russia agrees to enter into an economic treaty with the United States and Japan, which allows all three countries to maintain joint control over a group of islands off the Russian coastline - the fictional Braat Islands - with the countries becoming involved in the mining of rhenium, a mineral that is found to have strong properties and creating an alloy that can strengthen mechanized divisions of each country's army. Several years after the treaty is signed, Isaac Kumano, a former Soviet officer who now leads a terrorist outfit called the School of Democracy (SOD), utilizes an unknown Russian facility on the Braat Islands to activate the self-destruct codes of several former Soviet satellites. The resulting detonation not only creates a Kessler syndrome theory effect that takes out every satellite in orbit, but also causes an EMP blast that knocks out all of Earth's electronics, causing chaos, war, and anarchy which leads to several governments collapsing.

In Guantanamo Bay, former SOD member Ivan, serving time for his involvement with the group, is offered his freedom by US Intelligence director Charles Caraway in exchange for his help in combatting SOD. After escaping the anarchy that befell his prison, Ivan discovers that much of the world is now relying on old-fashioned technology from the early 20th century. Caraway provides Ivan assistance in the form of USAF Major Stella Maynard, and tasks him with assisting US forces in preventing SOD from shutting down the Panama Canal, as they begin using chemical weapons. Despite his best efforts, SOD manages to have the canal shut down, which causes the US navy to be paralysed following the shut down of the Suez Canal. Using a specialized tracking bullet, SOD is found to be in control of the Braat Islands, leading Ivan to be transported there to investigate further.

During this time, Ivan is shocked to come across a young woman from SOD known as C4, whom he knew and had thought dead after she intervened to protect him when he refused to condone SOD's methods and brutality on civilians. As he questions her presence, Ivan is assigned to locate a Japan physicist, Toshio Maeda, who was responsible for refining rhenium. Maeda confides that Kumano needed him in order to make use of the alloy for his own uses, and directs Ivan to a nearby base. The assault leads to the discovery of the facility Kumano used, which Caraway reveals to be a former Russian ICBM site that also controlled a military satellite that was found to be in contravention of several international treaties, which led the US to blackmail Russia into being coerced into the treaty over the Braat Islands.

Ivan swiftly finds himself forced to breach the facility, only to learn that Kumano has launched two missiles and that there is no way to stop them except with the abort codes he possesses. Seeking to stop him, Ivan enters into a heated battle with Kumano, learning that his former leader killed his parents over a botched mission and that C4 survived a bullet meant for him after an SOD scientist conducted experiments on her which led to her no longer aging naturally. Ivan manages to overcome the power Kumano stole for himself in order to kill him, treats C4 after she is injured during the battle, and destroys the missiles before they reach their target. Caraway promptly grants Ivan his freedom and allows him to spend time with C4.

== Development ==
Devil's Third was the first video game produced by Valhalla Game Studios, a company founded in 2008 by former Tecmo staff including Tomonobu Itagaki. The game was slated to be a departure from Itagaki's previous genres, hack and slash and fighting games.

Devil's Third began life as an intended Xbox 360 exclusive to be published by Microsoft Game Studios. After the partnership fell through, Itagaki met with Danny Bilson, then employed at THQ, who would share his vision of the title and agreed to publish it for PlayStation 3, Xbox 360 and PC. However, THQ would eventually be forced to drop publishing for the title following their bankruptcy in 2013, leaving Valhalla Game Studios without a partner to release the game with. Unlike other THQ intellectual property, which was sold to other publishers, the rights to Devil's Third were given back to Valhalla Game Studios. Despite the bankruptcy of THQ, Danny Bilson continued to act as a creative consultant on the title "until the very end".

Following the lack of THQ support, Valhalla Game Studios would partner with South Korean company Doobic to produce and publish the title. The Doobic partnership also promised a multi-platform release, including mobile platforms and PCs; however, Doobic eventually went out of business, setting back the development of Devil's Third even further, and leaving Valhalla Game Studios again to try and find a partner. The setbacks caused by the collapse of both THQ and Doobic landed the game in development hell for several years.

During this time, Valhalla Game Studios CEO Satoshi Kanematsu approached then-Nintendo president Satoru Iwata, who agreed to publish the title for Wii U. Itagaki stated that Nintendo published Devil's Third because "they don't have enough strong online games", and that it wasn't "a game that Nintendo could make internally, so we came in as their mercenaries to make a strong online game." Devil's Third was re-revealed as a Wii U exclusive at E3 2014 via IGN following Nintendo's E3 Digital Event and released the following year.

Devil's Third switched engines during its development, as the company responsible for making its original engine closed down. Since that time, Valhalla Game Studios had continued development using an adaptation of video game developer Relic Entertainment's engine. Although a version of Devil's Third for the Wii U was not confirmed at the time, Itagaki reported that the game would run perfectly fine on the system. Devil's Third now uses Unreal Engine 3 as the main game engine.

On June 23, 2016, Nintendo announced that the online portion on the Wii U version will be discontinued on December 28, 2016, at 8:00 pm PST, 16 months after the game's initial release. In January 2017, Nexon announced that the free-to-play Devil's Third Online for Windows will be discontinued on March 29, 2017, at 11:00 am JST, 9 months after the game's initial release. The Windows version was never released outside Japan.

=== North American release ===
Despite anticipation, and prior confirmation of the Japanese and European region release dates, the game was not featured at E3 2015 however, and prior to this its North American Nintendo eShop listing disappeared without explanation.

It was later revealed by gaming news outlet Siliconera that Nintendo of America decided not to publish the game, although the game is still confirmed for North American release. However, an alternative publisher was not announced at that point. While no official reasons were given, game journalist Liam Robertson, who originally tipped the public about Nintendo of America dropping publishing duties for Devil's Third, stated the subsidiary "lost faith" in the title, similar to the Wii title Disaster: Day of Crisis, which never saw a North American release. Robertson claims this information comes from an anonymous insider source while investigating the development of the cancelled Wii title Project H.A.M.M.E.R.. On July 11, 2015, Nintendo of America revealed that they would be sharing more information in regards to Devil's Third soon, but did not state whether or not they would be publishing the title in North America. Multiple sources had reported to Nintendo Life and Nintendo World Report that Nintendo of America did indeed drop publishing duties but had since reconsidered due to backlash against the decision.

On July 21, Nintendo of America officially announced they are publishing Devil's Third in the region, releasing the title in the fourth quarter of 2015. They also announced that the multiplayer mode of the game would be released on the PC from Valhalla as a free-to-play game, albeit in limited form by comparison. Unlike Nintendo of Europe, Nintendo of America did not send advance review copies to journalists. They could only begin reviewing once the game goes on sale. The game also saw a limited retail release in the region, as GameStop only received 420 copies to sell on their online store for the entire U.S. Despite low expectations, retail copies were already sold out in most American chains. eBay vendors began selling factory-new copies of the game for very high prices.

== Reception ==
Reception

Aggregate score
Aggregator	Score
Metacritic	43/100

Review scores
Publication	Score
Famitsu	33/40
GameRevolution	1/5
GameSpot	3/10
GamesRadar+	1.5/5
IGN	3.5/10
Nintendo Life	5/10
Nintendo World Report	3.5/10
VideoGamer.com	4/10
Digital Spy	1/5

=== Pre-release ===
Early previews for the single player campaign were mixed, with most complaints being the game's poor graphics, heavily inconsistent framerate, stiff aiming, and input lag. Despite negative reception, designer Itagaki thought that the game would be a "breakthrough for the industry", and that it would elevate the genre to a new level.

=== Post-release ===
The game received an aggregated score of 43/100 on review aggregator website Metacritic based on 54 reviews. Overall, praise was given to the game's design, gameplay and multiplayer elements, while most panned the game's campaign, controls, graphics, and inconsistent framerate. Japanese magazine Famitsu gave the game a score of 33/40, with four individual reviewers scoring it 8, 9, 8 and 8 out of 10. Since the game was exclusive to Amazon in Japan, sales were not available for tracking, but the game received a mostly positive reception from users. Nintendo Life gave Devil's Third 5/10 summarising that "Devil's Third is tricky to recommend, ultimately. There's undoubted fun to be had online, but at the same time this is an action game that sells Wii U gamers short. It's packed with good intentions and ambition, but Valhalla Game Studios was unable to execute its vision well enough. The devil is in the detail, and that's the problem". Sean Bell from GameSpot rated the game 3/10, praising multiplayer modes and occasional comedic moments, but heavily criticizing microtransactions in multiplayer, clunky controls and technical issues. Kirk McKeand of Digital Spy gave the game just 1/5 stating "Devil's Third is an offensively bad - sometimes actually offensive - action game, with sub-standard melee combat and fiddly gunplay. Riddled with technical issues, it's almost completely devoid of any redeeming qualities. It also has killer bats". IGN gave it a 3.5 out of 10, praising the game for mixing gunplay and melee combat, but criticized the game's poor presentation, simple and repetitive combat, random damage spikes, and pay to win multiplayer, calling it "an exercise in cynicism, a video game seemingly created for people who secretly hate them. There's barely even a seed of a good idea here, let alone a fully formed one. There isn't a single part of Devil's Third that does not feel as though it were ripped straight from a decade-old playbook, and its nihilistic reliance on simplistic violence reinforces that fact with every severed limb."

The game was placed on Polygon's "Worst Video Games of 2015" list. Similarly, it was also placed on GameSpot's "Worst Reviewed Games of 2015" list.

=== Sales ===
The game failed to make the UK Top 40 sales charts in its first week on sale in the region. The game is rumored to have sold only 3,000 copies in North America in its first month of release in the region, however limited retail copies were available at launch.

== Possible sequel ==
In an interview with Polygon, Itagaki stated that his team is interested in doing a sequel and stated that Devil's Third was envisioned as a trilogy.
