= Mario vs. Donkey Kong: Tipping Stars =

2015 video game

- Cover artwork of the PAL Wii U version
- Developer: Nintendo Software Technology
- Publisher: Nintendo
- Director: Stephen Mortimer
- Producer: Akiya Sakamoto
- Designers: Chris Polney; Ian Slutz; Philip Brodsky
- Artist: Brian McNeely
- Composer: James Phillipsen
- Series: Mario vs. Donkey Kong
- Platforms: Wii U, Nintendo 3DS
- Release: NA: March 5, 2015; JP: March 19, 2015; EU: March 20, 2015; AU: March 21, 2015
- Genre: Puzzle-platform
- Mode: Single-player

Mario vs. Donkey Kong: Tipping Stars (マリオ vs. ドンキーコング みんなでミニランド) is a 2015 puzzle-platform game developed by Nintendo Software Technology and published by Nintendo for the Nintendo 3DS and Wii U. It is the sixth game in the Mario vs. Donkey Kong series and the 200th video game featuring Mario. The game was released worldwide in March 2015 on the Nintendo eShop for all regions, and received a physical release in Japan. This is the first Nintendo-published title to support a cross-purchase concept; if players buy one version, they receive a free download code for the other version. The 3DS version is also the first Nintendo 3DS title to support Miiverse stamps.

The game received mixed reviews, with critics praising its graphics, soundtrack, and challenge, but criticism for its short length, removal of features from its predecessors, and high unoriginality. A spiritual successor, Mini Mario & Friends: Amiibo Challenge, was released for Wii U and Nintendo 3DS in 2016.

== Gameplay ==
Gameplay of Mario vs. Donkey Kong: Tipping Stars: Wii U version on the left and the 3DS version on the right.

Tipping Stars returns to the two-dimensional side view present in installments prior to Minis on the Move, and uses Mini-Land Mayhem gameplay. Using the 3DS' touchscreen or the Wii U GamePad, the player guides the Minis through levels within the shortest and best way possible. To achieve this, players are given up to four items to craft the Minis' ways such as red pathways or springs and keep them close. Once the Minis has reached the Goal Door, the remaining time is transferred to the final score, which determinates the trophy and amount of stars. If the Minis enter contact with hazards, such as enemies or spikes, the time limit is reached, or a Mini is left behind, the game is over. Bosses are removed and replaced by a natural level in which a Cursed Mini Mario wanders. When all levels are cleared, two extra worlds would be unlocked, as well as three Bonus worlds which is gradually unlocked by the numbers of gold trophies obtained. Both versions contain the same levels, though minor changes in the level design has been brought to fit in the 3DS' touchscreen.

When a level has been successfully done, players receive a trophy and stars. Stars are a currency that can be used to purchase an in-game level creator's items. Some items are impossible to purchase from completing the game normally. The titular mechanic allowed players to give and receive stars to other players by rating a created level via Miiverse, and stamps to create messages.

The online services were discontinued with Miiverse in November 2017, but Nintendo continued to sell the game until the Nintendo eShop closed.

== Development and release ==
A Mario vs. Donkey Kong tech demo was revealed at Game Developers Conference in March 2014 to show off the Nintendo Web Framework, a set of tools for developers to make Wii U games with common simple programming languages such as HTML5. In Nintendo's pre-E3 Digital Event video presentation, the game was confirmed for Wii U and was scheduled for release in 2015. Nintendo later revealed the final title, release dates, and the Nintendo 3DS version in a Nintendo Direct presentation held in January, in addition to the game's support for cross-platform play and cross-buy. (Note: Cross-buy means that a single purchase on either the Wii U or Nintendo 3DS eShop allows the user to download the game on both devices. Cross-play means that the user's saved progress and user-created levels will appear on both devices.) The game came in physical optical discs and 3DS game cards in Japan, and whilst Wii U and Nintendo 3DS game cases were available at retail in Europe, they did not include physical media, but rather a printed download code to be used in the respective Nintendo eShop.

Due to the Nintendo eShop closure for Wii U and Nintendo 3DS on March 27, 2023, the game is no longer available outside of Japan due to being digital only.

== Reception ==
Reception

Aggregate scores
Aggregator	Score
Metacritic	Wii U: 70/100 (26 reviews)
OpenCritic	38% recommend

Review scores
Publication	Score
Destructoid	5/10
Electronic Gaming Monthly	7/10
GameSpot	5/10
GamesRadar+	4/5
IGN	6.8/10
Nintendo Life	8/10
Nintendo World Report	7/10
Shacknews	7/10
The Guardian	3/5

Tipping Stars received mixed reviews, with an aggregate Metacritic score of 70/100 for the Wii U version. Fellow review aggregator OpenCritic assessed that the game received fair approval, being recommended by 38% of critics. IGN gave the game a 6.8/10, praising the challenge of the game and large amount of content, but complained about the lack of new ideas. Electronic Gaming Monthly also criticized the lack of innovation, but concluded that the game has a solid, simple and fun formula that makes the series recognizable in its genre.
