= Nintendo Software Technology =

American video game developer

Nintendo Software Technology Corporation
- Logo used since 2024

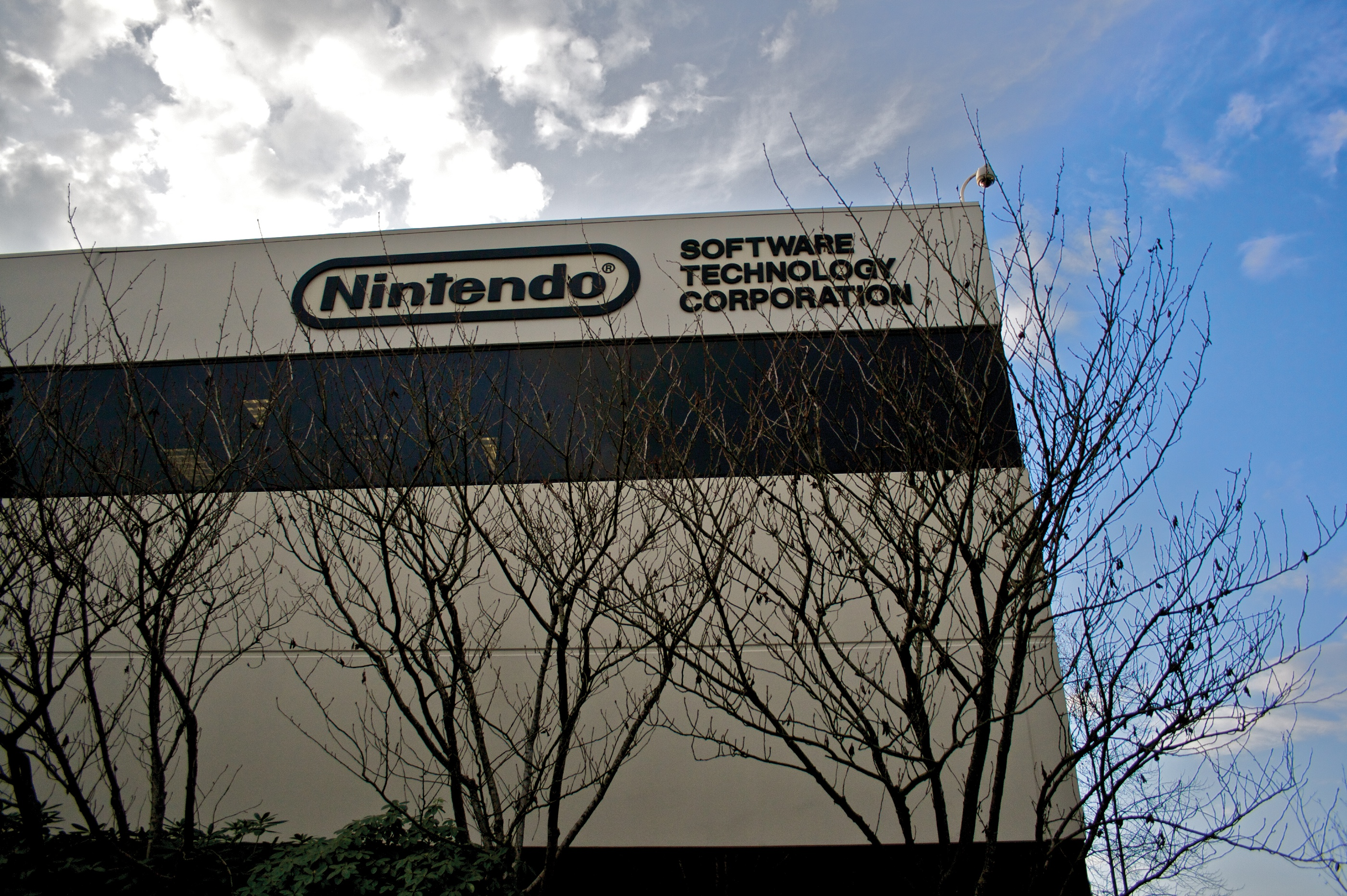
- Former headquarters in Redmond, Washington
- Trade name: Nintendo Software Technology
- Type: Subsidiary
- Industry: Video games
- Founded: 1998; 28 years ago
- Founders: Minoru Arakawa; Claude Comair; Scott Tsumura
- Headquarters: Redmond, Washington, United States
- Key people: Tim Bechtel (president)
- Products: List of software developed
- Owner: Nintendo
- Number of employees: ~50 (2019)
- Parent: Nintendo
- Website: careers.nintendo.com/studios/nintendo-software-technology/

Nintendo Software Technology Corporation, doing business as Nintendo Software Technology (NST), is an American video game developer. NST was created by Nintendo as a first-party developer to create games for the North American market, though their games have also been released worldwide. The company was founded by Minoru Arakawa, Claude Comair and Scott Tsumura in 1998 and is located inside of Nintendo of America's headquarters in Redmond, Washington.

NST has developed many games for Nintendo consoles, including the Mario vs. Donkey Kong series, Wave Race: Blue Storm, and Metroid Prime Hunters.

== History ==
In 1988, Claude Comair founded DigiPen Corporation in Vancouver, British Columbia. Soon after, he partnered with Nintendo of America on a certification program in video game programming. This partnership would help establish the DigiPen Institute of Technology as a private institute in Redmond. Washington. In 1998, DigiPen and Scott Tsumura's Big Bang Software were merged to form Nintendo Software Technology, consisting mostly of DigiPen personnel. Tsumura served as president and Comair was named chairman. NST was headquartered on DigiPen’s campus until 2010.

NST's first game, Bionic Commando: Elite Forces, was released for the Game Boy Color in 2000 and was a sequel of Capcom's Bionic Commando. Its next game was a Game Boy Color port of action RPG Crystalis, followed by Ridge Racer 64 and Pokémon Puzzle League for the Nintendo 64. The company then developed the multiplayer mode for 2001's Mario Kart: Super Circuit on the Game Boy Advance

=== Project H.A.M.M.E.R. ===
NST started developing Project H.A.M.M.E.R. for the Nintendo Wii in 2003, but several problems landed the project in 'development hell'. By 2005, about 75% of the game was complete before concerns about the game's quality emerged. A large amount of funding was spent on cut-scenes early in development, and so when the project started to fall behind, senior staff didn't want to end it because of the capital already spent. The American developers suggested that the problem was the gameplay, however, the Japanese managers believed the problem was the environments.

The game debuted at E3 2006, but never progressed further. It was later retooled into a more casual title called Wii Crush. By 2009, Nintendo had fired the chief game designer and pulled funding on the title. Soon after, a large number of staff were made redundant.

Logo used from 2008 to 2024

== List of software developed ==
Year	Title	Platform(s)
2000	Bionic Commando: Elite Forces	Game Boy Color
2000	Ridge Racer 64 (Note: Additional support by Namco)	Nintendo 64
2000	Crystalis	Game Boy Color
2000	Pokémon Puzzle League	Nintendo 64
2001	Wave Race: Blue Storm	GameCube
2003	Nintendo Puzzle Collection (Panel de Pon)	GameCube
2003	The Legend of Zelda: Collector's Edition	GameCube
2003	1080° Avalanche	GameCube
2004	Mario vs. Donkey Kong	Game Boy Advance
2004	Ridge Racer DS	Nintendo DS
2006	Metroid Prime Hunters	Nintendo DS
2006	Mario vs. Donkey Kong 2: March of the Minis	Nintendo DS
2007	Sin and Punishment (English translation)	Nintendo 64 (on Wii Virtual Console)
2008	Super Smash Bros. Brawl (Masterpiece Mode)	Wii
2008	Crosswords DS (Co-developed w/ Nuevo Retro Games)	Nintendo DS
2009	Mario vs. Donkey Kong: Minis March Again	DSiWare
2010	Aura-Aura Climber	DSiWare
2010	Mario vs. Donkey Kong: Mini-Land Mayhem!	Nintendo DS
2012	Crosswords Plus	Nintendo 3DS
2013	Mario and Donkey Kong: Minis on the Move	Nintendo 3DS
2015	Mario vs. Donkey Kong: Tipping Stars	Wii U / Nintendo 3DS
2016	Mini Mario & Friends: Amiibo Challenge	Wii U / Nintendo 3DS
2016	Super Mario Maker for Nintendo 3DS	Nintendo 3DS
2017	Snipperclips - Cut it out, together! (development support)	Nintendo Switch
2018	Captain Toad: Treasure Tracker (port development/DLC content)	Nintendo 3DS / Nintendo Switch
2019	The Stretchers (development support)	Nintendo Switch
2020	Good Job! (development support)	Nintendo Switch
2021	Super Mario 3D World + Bowser's Fury (co-development)	Nintendo Switch
2023	F-Zero 99	Nintendo Switch
2024	Mario vs. Donkey Kong (remake)	Nintendo Switch
2025	Super Mario Galaxy + Super Mario Galaxy 2 (port development)	Nintendo Switch

=== List of applications developed ===
Year	Title	Platform(s)
2006	Nintendo 64 emulator (Virtual Console)	Wii
2009	BBC iPlayer Channel	Wii
2009	Mario Calculator and Clock	DSiWare
2009	Animal Crossing Calculator and Clock	DSiWare
2011	Kirby TV Channel	Wii
2013	Wii Street U	Wii U

=== Cancelled games ===
Title	Platform(s)
Project H.A.M.M.E.R.	Wii
