= Sword of Legendia =

- Publisher(s): Namco Bandai Games
- Platform(s): Wii
- Release: Cancelled
- Genre(s): Role-Playing Game

Sword of Legendia was a video game announced in 2006 by Namco Bandai Games, for the Wii. Despite the title's similarity to the 2005 PlayStation 2 role-playing video game title by Namco, Tales of Legendia, it was confirmed by producer Tsutomu Gouda that it was not part of the Tales series. In a Japan Expo 2011 interview, the game was revealed to have been cancelled.

== History ==
Sword of Legendia was revealed during the Wii's preview event on September 13, 2006. That same year, there was a video on the Wii's Japanese website showing various interviews with developers, one of whom was Makoto Yoshizumi, producer of Tales of Symphonia. During a discussion of the Wii Remote, he displayed a single piece of artwork for the game. Little was said about Sword of Legendia after this, but it remained listed on Namco's Japanese website in their Wii games section, alongside Tales of Symphonia: Dawn of the New World, which was revealed back in 2007.

Tsutomu Gouda commented on the game in a 2008 interview regarding the then-upcoming Tales of Vesperia. He confirmed that he was in charge of the game, and that it was still in development, though the game would likely undergo a title change before release, as it was not meant to be associated with the Tales series.

On May 19, 2009, website Cubed3 posted an interview with the producer of Fragile, Kentarou Kawashima, asking about if Fragile and Sword of Legendia were in any way related and if Sword of Legendia was even still in development. Kawashima responded that the two games were unrelated and that he could not disclose details about Sword of Legendia.

In a French interview with Makoto Yoshizumi, it was revealed that Sword of Legendia had been cancelled for several years.
