= Project H.A.M.M.E.R. =

Cancelled video game

- Developer: Nintendo Software Technology
- Publisher: Nintendo
- Platform: Wii
- Release: Unreleased
- Genre: Beat 'em up

Project H.A.M.M.E.R. was a beat 'em up video game in development by Nintendo Software Technology for the Wii. The team's other projects included Metroid Prime Hunters, 1080° Avalanche, and Wave Race: Blue Storm. Project H.A.M.M.E.R. was originally announced at E3 2006. No information regarding the game has been released to the public or media since the game's original announcement. Rumors began circulating in mid-June 2007 that the game was not going to be released, and that the development team had gone to work on other games. Nintendo confirmed at E3 2007 that development was on hold. Beth Llewelyn, senior director of public relations at Nintendo of America, made a point to note that despite the game not being a focus of Nintendo’s, Project H.A.M.M.E.R. "may come back" in the future. A report revealed that the game was cancelled in 2009 due to creative internal conflicts at Nintendo Software Technology.

== History ==
Nintendo Software Technology, a team at Nintendo, began development on Project H.A.M.M.E.R. in 2003 for the Wii video game console. The project's internal codename was "Machinex" and it was designed for Nintendo's Western and hardcore gamer market. Unlike classic Nintendo games, the title was brutal and gritty. The game was officially announced at the 2006 Electronic Entertainment Expo. Silver Ant, another studio, produced the game's computer animated cutscenes.

All parties involved agreed that the game was not shaping up to Nintendo's quality standards late in development, as a postmortem from former developers explained that the game's Wii Remote motion were never sufficiently enjoyable. However, there was disagreement between the development studio and Nintendo's Japanese executives on how to retool the game. The developers reported the Japanese leads, one of them being Katsuhiko Kanno, ignoring their input on how to improve the game in respect to the cultural interests of the game's Western market, a sentiment that would eventually result in multiple developers accusing Nintendo of racism and nationalism.

What would come out of this tumultuous time period is an incarnation of the game titled "Wii Crush" with similar gameplay but a graphical overhaul to be brighter and cuter. Katsuhiko Kanno was replaced by Pikmin and Pikmin 2 director Masamichi Abe around this time. Project H.A.M.M.E.R.'s lead designer was also fired around this time, with developers claiming the Japanese leads used him as a scapegoat and did not take any personal responsibility for the failure of the game. Developers than began an exodus from NST, which prompted Nintendo of America to perform an internal review. This review concluded there was a clear conflict of interests between developers and management and company morale was lower than ever before. Funding for the game was officially pulled in 2009 and the game was canceled.

In July 2021, additional information unveiled from the 2020 Nintendo Gigaleak revealed its title internally as "Hammer Man" and spoke about its beat 'em up style resembling musou gameplay.
