= Airship Syndicate =

American video game development company

Airship Syndicate Entertainment, Inc.
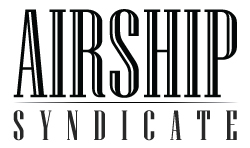
- Type: Private
- Industry: Video games
- Founded: September 25, 2014; 12 years ago
- Founder: Joe Madureira; Ryan Stefanelli; Steve Madureira
- Headquarters: Austin, Texas, U.S.
- Key people: Joe Madureira (CEO); Ryan Stefanelli (president)
- Number of employees: 40 (2019)
- Website: www.airshipsyndicate.com

Airship Syndicate Entertainment, Inc. is an American video game development company based in Austin, Texas. Founded by several ex-Vigil Games staff including Joe Madureira and Ryan Stefanelli, in 2014, Airship Syndicate is most known for developing Battle Chasers: Nightwar (2017), Darksiders Genesis (2019) and Ruined King: A League of Legends Story (2021).

== History ==
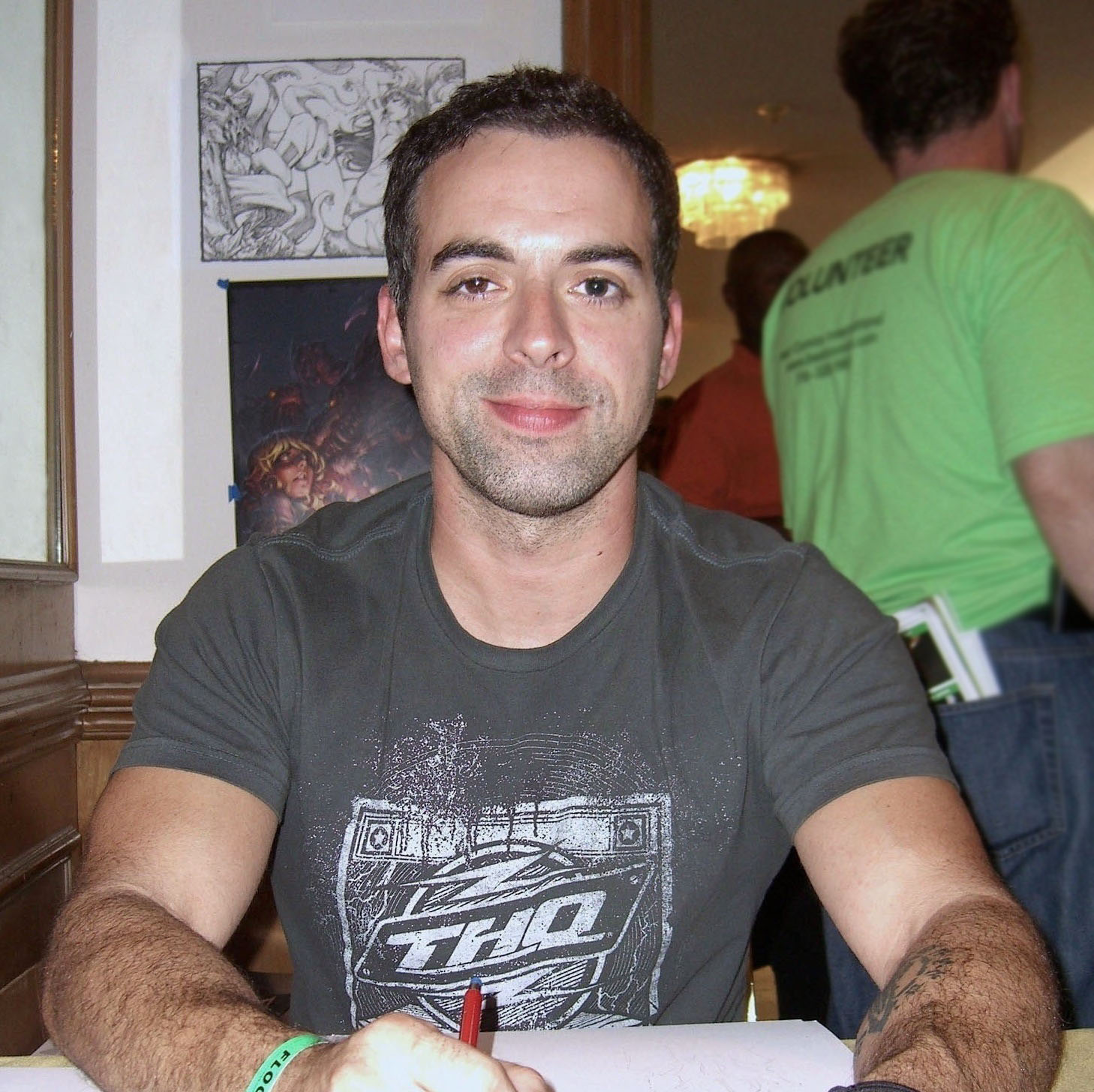
Joe Madureira co-founded the studio.

Vigil Games, the creator of the Darksiders series, was shut down after publisher THQ declared Chapter 11 bankruptcy. Joe Madureira, a co-founder of Vigil Games, returned to work for Marvel Comics, while Ryan Stefanelli, another co-founder, joined Crytek USA and worked on Hunt: Horrors of the Gilded Age. After Hunt's development was rebooted by Crytek and Madureira finished his work on the comics, the two, alongside ex-Vigil Games animator Steve Madureira, decided to start an independent studio with a small team, as they felt that Vigil grew to become too big. When they were choosing the studio's name, they initially considered using the name "Chaotic Evil", but they dropped the name after realizing that it was once used by a porn site. According to Madureira, they ultimately decided to use the title "Airship Syndicate" instead, since the title reflected a "vibe of exploration and otherworldly technologies".

After the company's establishment, it quickly began developing a dungeon crawling game, which was described by the team as a "love letter" to JRPG. Initially set to be a new intellectual property (IP), the game was later set in the Battle Chasers universe, which was created by Madureira. Madureira had reservations since he considered Battle Chasers to be an old comic book series and he was unsure if "fans would care". Nonetheless, when Battle Chasers: Nightwar launched on Kickstarter, it earned more than $850,000, surpassing its initial goal of $500,000. The team expanded since the scope of the project increased significantly during the course of development. The game was released in October 2017 by THQ Nordic and it was both a critical and commercial success.

After the successful release of Battle Chasers: Nightwar, the studio began pitching to THQ Nordic, the owner of the Darksiders IP, about a new installment in the series. Gunfire Games was working on Darksiders III, but due to Airship Syndicate's small size, it wanted to create a game with a smaller scope. The new installment, titled Darksiders Genesis, is played from an isometric perspective, unlike other games in the series. It has a two-year development cycle. The game was released to generally positive reviews in December 2019.

At The Game Awards 2019, the studio announced Ruined King: A League of Legends Story, a single-player turn-based role-playing game set in the League of Legends universe. Riot Forge published the game. The game was released on November 16, 2021. Airship Syndicate also confirmed that a next-generation console version for PlayStation 5 and Xbox Series X/S will be available as a free upgrade at a later date.

During TennoCon 2022, Airship Syndicate announced that they are collaborating with Digital Extremes for the development of a massively multiplayer online game. The game, Wayfinder, was announced during The Game Awards 2022. In November 2023, Digital Extremes announced that their publishing division had been shut down, and Airship Syndicate will regain full control of the property. On January 31, 2024, the company announced it would lay off 12 employees. President Ryan Stefanelli and CEO Joe Madureira will also take a pay cut.

In June 2026, Airship Syndicate announced their next game, a sci-fi action game titled Dust: Origins, would be receiving a Kickstarter campaign.

== Games ==
Year	Title	Publisher	Platform(s)
2017	Battle Chasers: Nightwar	THQ Nordic	Windows, macOS, Linux, PlayStation 4, Xbox One, Nintendo Switch, iOS, Android
2019	Darksiders Genesis	THQ Nordic	Windows, Nintendo Switch, PlayStation 4, Xbox One, Stadia
2021	Ruined King: A League of Legends Story	Riot Forge	Windows, Nintendo Switch, PlayStation 4, PlayStation 5, Xbox One, Xbox Series X/S
2024 (Note: Released in early access on August 17, 2023, with a full release in October 2024)	Wayfinder	Airship Syndicate (Note: Initially published by Digital Extremes before being transferred to Airship Syndicate in April 2024)	Windows, PlayStation 4, (Note: PlayStation 4 version is planned to be discontinued in 2024.) PlayStation 5, Xbox Series X/S
TBA	Dust: Origins	Airship Syndicate	TBA
