= Hunt: Showdown =

2019 video game

Hunt: Showdown 1896
- Developer: Crytek
- Publishers: Crytek; Koch Media (consoles)
- Engine: CryEngine V
- Platforms: Windows; Xbox One; PlayStation 4; PlayStation 5; Xbox Series X/S
- Release: Windows; 27 August 2019; Xbox One; 19 September 2019; PlayStation 4; 18 February 2020; PS5, Xbox Series X/S; 15 August 2024
- Genres: First-person shooter, extraction shooter
- Mode: Multiplayer

Hunt: Showdown 1896 (formerly known as simply Hunt: Showdown) is a first-person extraction shooter video game by Crytek. It was launched on Steam in early access on 22 February 2018 and for Xbox Game Preview on 29 May 2019. The full release of the game launched on 27 August 2019 for Microsoft Windows, it was also released on Xbox One on 19 September 2019 and PlayStation 4 on 18 February 2020. In the game, the player assumes the role of a bounty hunter who tries to kill mythical monsters in order to claim their bounties and survive long enough against other bounty hunters to reach an extraction point.

Hunt: Showdown was originally in development at Crytek USA, who wished to create a spiritual successor to Darksiders - a video game series developed by their predecessor, Vigil Games - under the title Hunt: Horrors of the Gilded Age. It was envisioned to be a cooperative multiplayer game. After the initial announcement in June 2014, Crytek USA was shut down due to financial issues, and the development was brought to the Crytek headquarters in Germany. The game, under the new title Hunt: Showdown, was re-announced in May 2017 and became a competitive multiplayer game in which players need to combat other players and enemies controlled by artificial intelligence in a large map that resembles an open world. The game received generally-positive reviews upon release and was praised for its innovative gameplay-loop.

An updated version of the game for PC, PlayStation 5, and Xbox Series X/S was released on 15 August 2024 under the title Hunt: Showdown 1896. Following the update, the PlayStation 4 and Xbox One versions of the game were delisted.

== Gameplay ==
In the game, the player will encounter zombie-like enemies known as grunts.

Hunt: Showdown is a multiplayer first-person shooter with three gameplay modes. In "Bounty-Hunt", the player plays as a bounty hunter who hunts down one or two of the game's six bosses to claim a bounty. Players can work on their own or with up to two other players to find clues about the monster's location in the four maps. Each map functions as a medium-sized open world filled with other environmental dangers and enemies such as Grunts, Hives, or Armoreds. As the player collects more clues, the location of the monster's lair is narrowed down. There are seven boss monsters: The Butcher, the Spider, the Assassin, the Scrapbeak, the Bloodskin, and two Wildcard-targets, the Rotjaw and the Hellborn. Players can use a variety of weapons ranging from shotguns and crossbows, to exotic elephant guns and rifles like the Mosin-Nagant, to defeat their enemies, though the amount of ammo is scarce in this game, forcing players to rely on making their shots count. They also have access to a large variety of tools such as traps and decoys. Upon killing the monster, players will collect the bounty and need to survive until they can reach one of the extraction points. The locations of these exits are randomly placed on a map. Collecting a bounty gives the player limited ability to see the approximate location of other nearby players, but also reveals the bounty-holder's location to all other players in the in-game map. Players can steal a bounty by killing a current bounty holder, which is a core strategic component of the game. Each match supports up to 12 players.

The game's second mode, "Soul Survivor" (previously called Quickplay), is a battle royale mode that lasts for 15 minutes. In each match, the player starts with minimal equipment of their choice between a low-grade revolver, low-grade shotgun, or a low-grade melee weapon. The player is tasked with finding 4 Rifts in a map (similar to Clues in Bounty Hunt) and activating the Wellspring. As the player travels the map they can scavenge for better equipment and weapons to better arm themselves. The player who activates the fourth Rift first becomes the Wellspring Carrier and needs to defend themselves against enemy players and win by either being the last one standing or depleting the Wellspring for the required amount of time. The victor who survives can recruit their Soul Survivor with all their collected traits and equipment to be played in the Bounty Hunt mode.

In October 2024, a new mode called "Bounty Clash" was added. This is a more fast-paced mode where the map is reduced to one compound/location. A boss target is already killed and waiting to be banished as players battle over the bounty and extraction.

== Development ==
Vigil Games, known for the Darksiders series, was shut down by THQ in 2013 as part of the publisher's bankruptcy. While Crytek's founder Cevat Yerli had expressed an interest in bidding for the Austin-based studio based on their work on Darksiders alone (and because Crytek was already planning to establish a US subsidiary in the city), he did not feel that their products fit with the company's business strategy. However, immediately after Vigil was closed, Yerli brought Vigil head David Adams on board to lead the new studio, Crytek USA, citing Adams's leadership skills. In turn, Crytek USA would hire many former employees from Vigil. It was originally stated that the new studio would focus on developing new projects rather than pursue regaining the rights to its former properties; the studio did attempt to regain the rights to Darksiders — but they were instead acquired by Nordic Games.

Hunt: Horrors of the Gilded Age was announced in June 2014 as Crytek USA's first game. Hunt was designed to be a cooperative game; Adams recalled having been frequently asked about the possibility of adding co-op to a future installment of Darksiders, and stated that "one of the first things we said when we got here was, we are absolutely doing a four-player co-op game. That wasn't even up for discussion". The game is set in the late-19th century, and features weapons and classes reminiscent of the era. In response to comparisons to The Order: 1886, another 19th-century third-person gothic action horror game that was unveiled at E3, Adams contended that there were few similarities between the games, noting their focus on co-op and arguing that the portrayal of the era in The Hunt was more "authentic", unlike that of The Order, which he felt was the "BioShock version" of the era. Players will be able to customise their characters with different skills and outfits; Adams said that "if you want to make Sherlock Holmes or a gunslinger from the Old West, or a witch hunter from Eastern Europe, you have the costume choices, you have the weapon choices, you have the skill choices".

Hunt: Showdown carries "a lot of the DNA" of the Darksiders series; Adams noted that the game would incorporate "old school elements" of its genre in new ways (much like Darksiders, which cited The Legend of Zelda as an influence), and feature a large number of distinct creatures and bosses as enemies in contrast to "typical" shooting games, which, in Adam's opinion, only tended to have "maybe a dozen" different enemies. He acknowledged that his staff had experience from Darksiders in designing large numbers of distinct enemy types—Adams alone designed 18 of the bosses in Darksiders II. Hunt also utilizes procedurally generated enemy placement, obstacles, and objectives on the map, so that no two missions are identical. Hunt is built atop CryEngine; Adams remarked that the transition from the custom engine developed for Darksiders to CryEngine made the former look inferior.

On 30 July 2014, Crytek announced that as part of a restructuring, the development of Hunt would be shifted to Crytek, and Crytek USA would cease to operate as a studio-only as a provider of US-based support for CryEngine licensees. Kotaku reported that much of the studio's staff, including David Adams, had left the company in response to late wage payments by Crytek. Similar issues had been experienced by Crytek UK, which was shut down the same day with the sale of the Homefront franchise to Koch Media.

On 16 May 2017, Crytek released a teaser on YouTube announcing that the game was still in production under a new title, Hunt: Showdown. In October, Crytek revealed via IGN First that the game would have an Early Access release on Steam. A closed alpha test on PC started in January 2018. The closed alpha concluded on 22 February, with the early access launching later the same day. Hunt was released for Xbox Game Preview on 29 May 2019.

== Release ==
Hunt: Horrors of the Gilded Age was first announced to have a beta in late 2014, after which a planned release for PlayStation 4 and Xbox One. Hunt was initially planned to be a free-to-play game, however, Adams emphasized that the game would still have the quality and size of a "AAA" title. Hunt was to be monetized purely through cosmetic items and experience boosts, however, when the game launched in Early Access on 22 February 2018, it was released with a pay-to-play model.

On 13 December 2014, Crytek delayed the late 2014 planned closed beta without giving a date or range for when it may come. The delay was due to the transition of development from their Austin studio to their Frankfurt team.

Hunt: Showdown was launched in early access on 22 February 2018. It was announced at 2018 Gamescom that the game would be released on Xbox One through its Xbox Game Preview program.

On 3 July 2019, Crytek announced on the game's website that the official release of the game would be on 27 August 2019, for Microsoft Windows. The Xbox One official release was due to be released on the same day as the official release for Microsoft Windows but was delayed to 19 September 2019 due to technical issues. The game was released on PlayStation 4 on 18 February 2020.

In August 2024, Crytek upgraded the underlying game engine and released a new map, relaunching the game as Hunt: Showdown 1896 and removing support for older generation consoles. On December 12, the Post Malone's Murder Circus event was released, set to run through February 2025.

== Television series ==
In November 2021, Binge announced a live-action television series adaptation of the game. Binge's Allan Ungar and Vince Talenti will produce, with Crytek's Avni Yerli, Faruk Yerli, and Pascal Tonecker joining as executive producers.

== Reception ==
=== Critical reception ===
Reception

Aggregate score
| Aggregator | Score |
|---|---|
| Metacritic | PC: 81/100; PS4: 81/100; XONE: 76/100 |

Review scores
| Publication | Score |
|---|---|
| Edge | 9/10 |
| Eurogamer | Recommended |
| PlayStation Official Magazine – UK | 9/10 |
| PC Gamer (US) | 74/100 |
| PCGamesN | 6/10 |
| PlayStation: The Official Magazine | 9/10 |
| VG247 | 5/5 |

The game received "generally-favorable reviews" upon release according to review aggregator website Metacritic. Critics praised the game for its innovative gameplay-loop and noted that the game offered a unique experience when compared with other multiplayer games on the market, though some critics were disappointed by the game's lack of content at launch.

VG247 praised the unpredictability of Hunt, writing that it "I know where enemies are likely to come from, and what they’re likely to do, and yet every game seems to throw something surprising up...because it simply provides such a broad canvas for imaginative gambits by players". Eurogamer liked the feeling of dread that Hunt created, saying that, "I'm not sure I've played a multiplayer game that breeds such tension since Rainbow Six: Siege". PCGamesN's Benjamin Griffin felt that sound design helped the gameplay be more tense "Flocks of crows, creaking boardwalks, and maimed horses wailing on the ground all signal your presence, while inside, jangling chains and crunching glass are to be avoided". Anthony McGlynn of PC Gamer enjoyed Hunt's twist on the battle royale genre, feeling that the game's focus "about escaping, not killing everyone - is simple but deeply effective". However he criticized the limited number of maps and weapons as making the game feel repetitive past a certain point.

=== Accolades ===
The game was nominated for "Best Sound-Design for an Indie-Game" at the 18th Annual G.A.N.G. Awards.
