= Darksiders (video game) =

2010 video game

- North American cover art
- Developers: Vigil Games; Kaiko (Remastered)
- Publishers: THQ; THQ Nordic (Remastered)
- Directors: Joe Madureira; David Adams
- Producer: Timothy Bell
- Designers: Haydn Dalton; Ryan Stefanelli
- Programmers: Colin Bonstead; Tony Bennett
- Artist: Han Randhawa
- Writer: Joe Madureira
- Composers: Cris Velasco; Mike Reagan; Scott Morton
- Series: Darksiders
- Engine: Phoenix Engine
- Platforms: PlayStation 3; Xbox 360; Microsoft Windows; PlayStation 4; Xbox One; Wii U; Nintendo Switch
- Release: January 5, 2010: Original Version PlayStation 3 & Xbox 360; NA: January 5, 2010; AU: January 7, 2010; EU: January 8, 2010 Microsoft Windows; NA: September 23, 2010; AU: September 23, 2010; EU: September 24, 2010 Warmastered Edition PlayStation 4, Xbox One; WW: November 22, 2016 Microsoft Windows; WW: November 29, 2016 Wii U; WW: May 23, 2017 Nintendo Switch; WW: April 2, 2019
- Genres: Hack and slash, action-adventure
- Mode: Single-player

Darksiders is a hack and slash action-adventure video game developed by Vigil Games and published by THQ. The game's inspiration is from the Four Horsemen of the Apocalypse, with the player taking the role of the horseman War. The game was released for the PlayStation 3 and Xbox 360 on January 5, 2010, in North America, January 7 in Australia, January 8 in Europe, and March 18 in Japan. The Microsoft Windows version was released in North America and Australia on September 23, and in Europe on September 24. A parallel sequel, Darksiders II, was released on August 14, 2012.

A remastered version of the game named Darksiders: Warmastered Edition was released on November 22, 2016, for PlayStation 4 and Xbox One and on November 29, 2016, for Microsoft Windows. A Wii U version was released on May 23, 2017, and a Nintendo Switch version was released on April 2, 2019.

== Gameplay ==
War using a pistol while riding his steed, Ruin

In Darksiders, players control War, one of the Four Horsemen of the Apocalypse, in a third-person perspective. The world is split into separate locations with many areas initially inaccessible until later in the game. The center of the world, The Scalding Gallow, functions as a hub where War is given new objectives and paths to unlock new areas, many of which require the use of newly-gained abilities to progress.

Although War is initially limited to the use of his two-handed signature sword, Chaos Eater, he eventually obtains other weapons throughout the course of the game. He also has a Scythe, which he uses as his other main offensive weapon. Weapons have different combinations of attack that can be obtained throughout the game. Along with combos, players are encouraged to use countering moves, blocks, and swift dodging. Projectile weapons such as a revolver and a boomerang-style throwing blade can also be used. Objects scattered throughout the environment can also be used as weapons and projectiles. At a later point in the game, War gains the ability to summon a horse that provides faster movement and increased attack power.

Along with weapon-based attacks, War can also use an array of magic-based attacks, known as Wrath powers, that are both offensive & defensive in nature. The amount of Wrath powers available are determined through the Wrath meter. War's Chaos Form, which transforms him into a large, fiery and extremely resistant entity can be activated once War's Chaos meter is filled.

When enemies are near defeat, War can perform an elaborate and violent finishing move, instantly killing them. Some larger foes can be briefly ridden and steered into other enemies before being finished off. War eventually encounters large boss opponents that are both giant in size and deal heavy damage, and are themselves puzzle-based battles requiring certain methods and certain weapons to defeat them, and in some cases quick time button events to dodge or deal attacks.

Upon defeat, some enemies expel souls that provide different benefits. Green souls that fill the health bar, yellow souls that fill the Wrath meter, and blue souls that are the game's form of currency, and can be spent on new combo attacks, enhanced Wrath powers, power-ups, and potions. Also, there are artifacts littered throughout the world that can be exchanged for more blue souls, with bonuses for completing each set. Additionally, souls can be obtained in chests found throughout the world. Other items that can be located include Wrath Core and Lifestone fragments, whereupon collecting four, War's Wrath or Health, respectively, are permanently increased.

== Plot ==
=== Story ===
Since the beginning of time, Heaven and Hell have been at war. To preserve balance, a mediating force known as the Charred Council emerged, recruiting the Four Horsemen of the Apocalypse to enforce its will. Anticipating humanity's future significance, the Council declared them as a third kingdom under its protection. A truce between Heaven and Hell was sealed by the Seven Seals, which would only be broken when humanity was ready to join Endwar. The breaking of the final seal would summon the Four Horsemen and begin the Apocalypse.

The Horseman of War (voiced by Liam O'Brien) arrives on present-day Earth amid the outbreak of the Endwar between angels and demons while humanity is caught in the crossfire. He confronts the archangel Abaddon (voiced by Troy Baker), only to discover that the Seventh Seal remains intact and the other Horsemen have not been summoned. During the battle, Abaddon is slain by the colossal demon Straga (also voiced by Troy Baker). War almost defeats Straga but mysteriously loses his strength and falls under the judgement of the Charred Council (voiced by Fred Tatasciore), who accuse him of prematurely triggering the Apocalypse. Granted permission to uncover the true culprits, War is stripped of his powers and bound to the Watcher (voiced by Mark Hamill), a Council servant empowered to execute him for disobedience. He returns to a ruined Earth, where a century has passed since "the Destroyer" annihilated humanity and defeated the forces of Heaven. The stranded remnants of the angelic army have formed a resistance force called the Hellguard, led by Uriel (voiced by Moon Bloodgood).

The demon merchant Vulgrim (voiced by Phil LaMarr) directs War to the Black Tower and to seek advice from the imprisoned demon lord Samael (voiced by Vernon Wells). Upon release, Samael reveals that four ancient monsters called the Chosen, whose hearts must be offered to open the Tower. War slays all the Chosen, only to learn they were meant to prevent Samael’s return. Honoring his word, Samael restores the path to the Black Tower and hints that the Charred Council has deliberately kept War weakened.

Inside the Black Tower, War frees Azrael (voiced by Keith Szarabajka), the Angel of Death. Azrael confesses that he and Abaddon conspired to break six of the Seven Seals. Their goal was to lure demon lords into an ambush and then convince an ancient smith Ulthane (voiced by JB Blanc) to reforge the Seals and erase all trace of the plot. But Abaddon’s death ruined the plan, and the Endwar began in earnest.

War fights a rematch with the demon Straga, whose death causes the Tower to collapse. Azrael transports himself and War to the Garden of Eden, where War visits the Tree of Knowledge to receive a vision. In this vision, War sees that Abaddon went to Hell after his death and was offered the choice to "serve in Heaven or rule in Hell". Knowing he was doomed for punishment in any case, he chose to become the Destroyer. He also guards the unbroken Seventh Seal, which would otherwise call the Four Horsemen to Earth. War is also shown that the Charred Council was aware of the conspiracy; they allowed the Apocalypse to happen and summoned War themselves, knowing he would track down the conspirators to clear his name. War then sees himself slain with a glowing sword. Azrael deduces the sword is the Armageddon Blade, a weapon powerful enough to kill the Destroyer, which has been broken into shards; War gathers the pieces and takes them to Ulthane, who reforges the blade.

Uriel, Abaddon's former lieutenant and leader of the Hellguard, confronts War, whom she still believes guilty of launching the Apocalypse and causing Abaddon's death. She challenges him to the Death Oath, a duel to the death. War is victorious, but spares her life, and reveals the Destroyer's identity as the fallen Abaddon. Enraged, Uriel leads the Hellguard into battle against the Destroyer, but they are defeated, as in War's vision. War then enters the battle with the newly forged Armageddon Blade, refuses the Destroyer's temptation, and after a fierce battle succeeds in killing him.

War retrieves the Seventh Seal from the Destroyer, but is subdued by the Watcher, who knows that if War were to regain his strength, he would turn against the corrupt Council. Uriel intervenes, killing War with the Armageddon Blade as foreseen in his vision. The sword also shatters the Seventh Seal, which restores War to life, and frees him from the Council's control, whereupon he kills the Watcher by crushing his head. Uriel warns War that he cannot stand alone against the forces of Heaven, Hell, and the Council; he replies that he is not alone, as the other three Horsemen are seen descending to Earth.

=== Characters ===
The player character is War, first of the Four Horsemen of the Apocalypse. Along with the rest of the Horsemen, War is not aligned to Heaven or Hell but instead serves at the whim of the Charred Council, whose purpose is upholding the balance between the two forces. He maintains a strict code of honor and will battle any obstacle in his way. It is prophesied that War and the other Horsemen will descend upon the Earth once the Apocalypse begins.

Throughout the story, War is bound to and accompanied by The Watcher, an emissary charged by the Council to watch over and guide War on his journey. Because of his assigned role, he is constantly skeptical and cynical of War's actions, much to War's annoyance and often anger. He relishes his duty and enjoys needling War and bossing him about simply because he can. War later employs the guidance of Samael, once a mighty and feared demon, now imprisoned, who himself seeks vengeance against the Destroyer, the main antagonist of the story and leader of the victorious forces on Earth. Many other characters become central to the overall plot, recurring at times. Among these is Uriel, leader of Heaven's armies after their first leader, Abaddon, was killed during a major battle; now stranded on Earth, Uriel seeks revenge against those she believes responsible. Another recurring character is Vulgrim, a demon merchant who provides gear and abilities for War in exchange for human souls. Finally there is Ulthane, also known as the Black Hammer, an "Old One" who at first is hostile towards War, but the two quickly become allies; first after Ulthane aids War in entering the Griever's lair, then providing War with a magical revolver and re-forging the Armageddon Blade for him.

== Related media ==
Creator Joe Madureira planned a comic book series and a possible film adaptation for the game. Madureira has been reportedly working on the screenplay and may sell the rights to a Hollywood studio. However, the rights belong to THQ Nordic, leaving the status of the project unknown.

== Reception ==
=== Critical reception ===
Reception

Aggregate score
Aggregator	Score
Metacritic	PS3: 82/100; X360: 83/100; PC: 83/100; PS4: 81/100; XONE: 80/100; WIIU: 77/100; NS: 77/100

Review scores
Publication	Score
1Up.com	B
Eurogamer	8/10
Game Informer	8.5/10
GamePro	3.5/5
GameSpot	8/10
GamesRadar+	8/10
GameZone	8/10
IGN	9.0/10 (AU); 8.9/10 (UK); 7.8/10 (US)
Play	10/10
X-Play	2.0/5

Darksiders has received positive reviews. Aggregating review website Metacritic gave the Xbox 360 version 83/100, the PlayStation 3 version 82/100, and the PC version 83/100.

GameZone's Dakota Grabowski gave the game an 8/10 on both PlayStation 3 and Xbox 360, saying that "THQ and Vigil Games did an outstanding job creating an intellectual property that has weight. The voice-acting is top-notch, the combat is exquisite, the replay value is high, and the world they have created is fascinating. Darksiders is a marvelous way to start out 2010". Being overall positive, IGN saw the elements of Darksiders as a combination of three separate game franchises. Devil May Cry, God of War, and The Legend of Zelda games have been used to compare to the style of Darksiders.

=== Sales ===
Darksiders has sold over 1 million units worldwide.

== Sequels ==
THQ creative director Luis Gigliotti revealed in a 2009 interview that Darksiders would be a franchise. Darksiders II was released in August 2012. War's brother, the Horseman, Death, is the protagonist of Darksiders II.

A third entry in the Darksiders series was originally planned by Vigil Games, but the fate of its franchise was threatened due to financial complications. Its parent company, THQ, filed for bankruptcy in 2012. The company's assets were sold at an auction, excluding Vigil Games, which was shut down along with the parent company, THQ. Darksiders was purchased by Nordic Games in the final transaction of THQ's assets in April 2013.

The third installment, Darksiders III, was developed by Gunfire Games, the team largely consisting of former Vigil Games employees and published by THQ Nordic. It was released on November 27, 2018. The game follows the Horseman Fury as the protagonist and is set during War's 100-year imprisonment.
