= Polycount =

Forum for video game creators

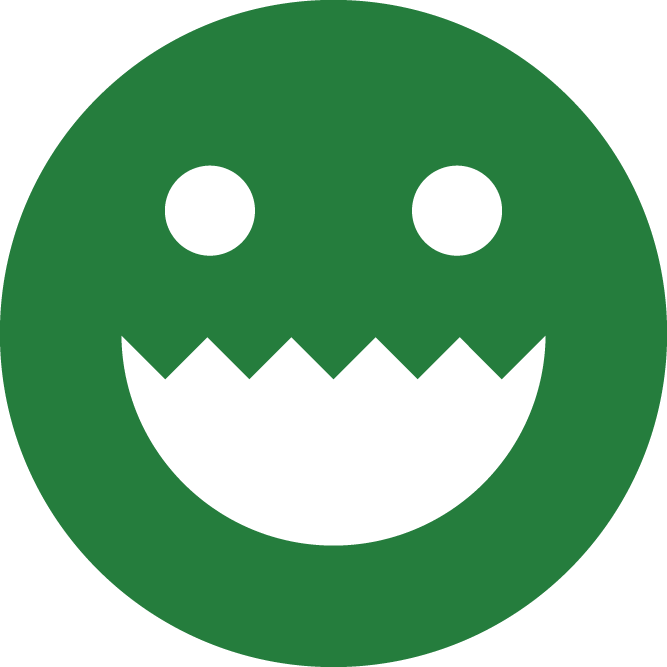
- Website type: Art community
- Creators: Andrew ‘r13′ Risch, Ted ‘bearkub’ Shockey
- Website: www.polycount.com

Polycount is a website and community of professional & hobbyist artists that specialize in creating 3D art for video games.

== History ==
Founded on April 1, 1998, by Andrew Risch and Ted Shockey, the site was originally named Q2PMP (Quake2 Player Model Pack), featuring user created Quake 2 plug-in characters.

Although Polycount was originally created for Q2PMP, it remains as a community for 3D artists. Polycount's main goal is to "provide 3D video game artists the best resource for 3D news, discussion, and community. Every decision, update, and move we make internally is with our community’s best interests in mind."

== Present ==
Polycount is widely known for its community forum, but also features a wiki for resources for 3D artists, and a front-page news section covering contests, interviews and spotlighting resident artists. Polycount was a large part of the Mann Co. Store update for Valve's Team Fortress 2, and has since partnered with game studios such as Vigil Games, Riot Games, Valve, and Torn Banner Studios to host contests for creating video game art assets and concept art for well known games, including Darksiders II, League of Legends, Chivalry: Medieval Warfare, and Dota 2.
