= Chronos (2016 video game) =

- Developer: Gunfire Games
- Publishers: Gunfire Games (original version); THQ Nordic (Before the Ashes)
- Director: David Adams
- Designers: Nicolas Fikac; Marcus Luna DeLeon; Richard Vorodi
- Platforms: Original version Microsoft Windows; Before the Ashes; Microsoft Windows; Nintendo Switch; PlayStation 4 Stadia; Xbox One
- Release: Original version March 28, 2016; Before the Ashes; December 1, 2020
- Genre: Action role-playing
- Mode: Single-player

Chronos is a 2016 action role-playing game developed and published by Gunfire Games for the Oculus Rift virtual reality (VR) headset. The game received generally positive reviews upon release. An overhauled version of the game, titled Chronos: Before the Ashes was released for Microsoft Windows, PlayStation 4, Nintendo Switch, Xbox One and Stadia on December 1, 2020.

== Gameplay ==
Chronos is an action role-playing game viewed from a third-person perspective, though the game only has a fixed camera similar to the early Resident Evil games. In the game, the player assumes control of a customizable protagonist, who is on a quest to kill a dragon inside a labyrinth. The game's combat mainly involves slashing enemies with melee weapons while fending off hostile attacks with a shield. Should the player die when they are exploring, they can only reenter the labyrinth one in-game year later, and the player character will age, which alters the character's attributes. As the player progresses in the game, they will solve puzzles, acquire new weapons and unlock magical powers. As the player earns experience, they will level up which allows them to improve the player character's attributes including strength, agility, arcane, and vitality.

== Development ==
The game was the first title released by Gunfire Games, which was co-founded by David Adams, the founder of Vigil Games who have created the Darksiders series. The game was announced on June 11, 2015, during a press conference held by Oculus. It was among the first titles unveiled for the Oculus Rift VR headset and it became the headset's launch game when it was released on March 28, 2016.

In September 2020, THQ Nordic announced an overhauled version of the game named Chronos: Before the Ashes. This version of the game removes the VR requirement, and serves as the prequel to Gunfire's 2019 game Remnant: From the Ashes. Before the Ashes was released for Microsoft Windows, PlayStation 4, Xbox One, Nintendo Switch and Stadia on December 1, 2020.

== Reception ==
Reception

Aggregate score
Aggregator	Score
Metacritic	PC: 77/100; NS: 67/100; PC (Before the Ashes): 67/100; PS4: 68/100; XONE: 71/100

Review scores
Publication	Score
IGN	8/10
Nintendo World Report	(BtA) 7.5/10
PC Gamer (US)	(BtA) 72/100

The game received generally positive reviews according to review aggregator website Metacritic. Critics compared the game to The Legend of Zelda and Dark Souls series. Some critics noted that gameplay-wise, the game was traditional but the incorporation of VR elevated the experience.

== Official website ==
- Official website
