= Darksiders II =

2012 video game

- Developer: Vigil Games (Note: Ported version developed by Gunfire Games)
- Publisher: THQ (Note: Nordic Games published the ported version.)
- Directors: Joe Madureira; David Adams; Marvin Donald
- Producers: Ryan Stefanelli; Timothy Bell; Kay Gilmore; Sam Newman; David Stalker
- Designers: Haydn Dalton; Clint Bogue; Richard Vorodi; Ben Cureton
- Programmer: Colin Bonstead
- Artist: Han Randhawa
- Writers: Paul De Meo; David Slagle
- Composer: Jesper Kyd
- Series: Darksiders
- Platforms: Microsoft Windows; PlayStation 3; Xbox 360; Wii U; PlayStation 4; Xbox One; Nintendo Switch; Google Stadia; PlayStation 5; Xbox Series X/S
- Release: August 14, 2012: Original Version Microsoft Windows, PlayStation 3 & Xbox 360; NA: August 14, 2012; AU: August 16, 2012; EU: August 21, 2012 Wii U; NA: November 18, 2012; PAL: November 30, 2012 Deathinitive Edition PlayStation 4, Xbox One; WW: October 27, 2015 Microsoft Windows; WW: November 5, 2015 Nintendo Switch; WW: September 26, 2019 Google Stadia; WW: September 1, 2021 PlayStation 5, Xbox Series X/S; WW: October 15, 2024
- Genres: Action role-playing, hack and slash
- Mode: Single-player

Darksiders II is an action role-playing hack and slash video game developed by Vigil Games and published by THQ. It is the sequel to Darksiders and was released in August 2012 for Microsoft Windows, PlayStation 3, Xbox 360 and as a launch title for Wii U upon the console's North American and PAL regions release in November of the same year. The story follows the efforts of player character Death to clear the name of his brother, War, who stands accused of wiping out humanity. On a total budget of $50 million, it was one of the most expensive video games to develop of all time.

A ported version, titled Darksiders II: Deathinitive Edition, was published by Nordic Games for the PlayStation 4, Xbox One and Microsoft Windows in 2015, ported to the Nintendo Switch in 2019, and released in Google Stadia in 2021. A parallel sequel, Darksiders III, was released in November 2018, while a spin-off prequel, Darksiders Genesis, was released in December 2019.

== Gameplay ==
Players take control of Death, one of the Four Horsemen of the Apocalypse. The core gameplay is an action role-playing hack and slash style. The game makes frequent use of interactive puzzle elements, requiring the player to think their way through a series of levers, doors, elevators, portals, etc. in order to traverse areas and reach objectives. Which most of the time requires a key or a specific power to pass through.

Maps are vast and each contain open world regions that can be explored freely on foot or by his horse Despair, along with numerous dungeons where quest objectives are generally carried out. There are main and side quests, with main and side boss fights. Worlds can be traversed via fast travel, whereby the player can teleport to certain map points instantly. While inside a dungeon, the player is allowed to fast travel back to the overworld while saving their dungeon location for continuation later without losing progress.

Death is aided by Despair, a horse that is available for use in open areas of the overworld for faster travel, and Dust, a raven that guides him to his objectives. Death's primary weapons are two scythes, one wielded in each hand. Secondary weapons include melee weapons like hammers, axes, and maces as "slow" options; "fast" options are generally gauntlet-style weapons that provide the player with claws and other bladed arm extensions, at the expense of less range and power than the slow weapons.

There are several different movement options, including swimming, running along walls, and climbing options that are available on specially placed wooden elements, such as wall pegs and beams. In the course of quests, Death acquires "Death Grip", which operates as a grappling hook on certain objects; and "Voidwalker". Other abilities like "Soul Splitter" and "Interdiction" are acquired, which allow the player to control multiple characters to traverse puzzle areas.

Health, Wrath, and Reaper resource meters display on-screen whenever they change, along with an experience meter that shows how close the player is to the next character class level. Wrath is the game's mana-type system, being a resource used for special abilities. Reaper is a separate resource used for the Reaper ability, and when full, Death can transform briefly into his grim reaper form, which is more resilient and deals more damage.

There are eight player statistics, including a character class level that increases at various experience levels. Each new level gives the player a skill point that can be used in a skill tree that contains new abilities. Other statistics can be increased by equipping items, with each item having various stat-altering characteristics. The player's inventory contains seven different pages of equipment classes (primary and secondary weapon, shoulder, armor, glove, boot, and talisman, with an additional page for quest items). New equipment can be acquired via enemy drops, looting chests, or purchasing from vendor characters. New combo moves can also be purchased from "Trainer" characters.

"Stonebites", which are colored stones hidden throughout the world, can be collected (after several quests have been completed) and traded to a character named Blackroot, in groups of three, in exchange for various permanent statistic upgrades. There are three Stonebite types, indicated by their color, and the particular combination traded determines which upgrade is received.

Money is dropped by enemies and chests, and can be acquired by selling items to vendors. Special "Possessed weapons" are rarely acquired, which provide another more unorthodox mechanic for trading in unwanted items, whereby the possessed weapon can be upgraded by "sacrificing" other lesser items to it.

== Plot ==
Darksiders II is parallel to the previous game. The Four Horsemen of the Apocalypse - War, Strife, Fury, and Death, the player character - are the last of the Nephilim, cursed fusions of angels and demons who waged war on all Creation for a place to live. To preserve the balance of the universe, the Four received power from the Charred Council in exchange for slaughtering their kin. Death personally cut down the last of their brethren, Absalom, the first Nephilim, but he secretly preserved the souls of the Nephilim in an amulet, defying the Council, and gave it to the Keeper of Secrets, known as the Crowfather, for safekeeping.

While War is charged with his crimes of starting the Apocalypse early and dooming mankind to extinction, Death, sure of his brother's innocence, sets out to erase his brother's 'crime' and resurrect humanity. He first travels to the Icy Veil to seek the Crowfather for proof of War's innocence and a way to restore Earth. The Crowfather tells Death to go to the Tree of Life, and demands that Death take back the amulet. When Death refuses, the Crowfather attacks him in the shape of War. Death kills the Crowfather, who shatters the amulet and embeds the fragments in the Horseman's chest before sending him into a portal.

Death wakes up in the Forge Lands, a world populated by the Makers, physically imposing beings who are the architects of Creation. He learns that their world, like many others, has been overrun with Corruption, a dark force that has blocked off the Tree of Life and has taken over many of the Makers' constructs, among which a massive Guardian made to combat the Corruption. With the help of a Maker named Karn, Death reaches the tainted Guardian and destroys it, allowing it to be reassembled free of Corruption. The Guardian clears the path to the Tree of Life, which allows Death to reach his goal. Upon reaching the entrance, however, Death is seized by Corruption and dragged into the Tree. There, Death is accosted by the shadowy form of Absalom, whose hatred of Death's betrayal birthed the Corruption.

Death is transported to the Kingdom of the Dead, where he encounters the merchant Ostegoth, who explains he must find the Well of Souls to bring back mankind, and to that end he must speak with the Lord of Bones. After completing trials to gain an audience with the Lord, Death is transported to the City of the Dead to find a soul who knows about the Well: the Crowfather. The Crowfather tells Death that the souls of humanity have been transported to the Well, which is where the spirits of all things living are cleansed and renewed before they are sent out to be reborn. In order to access it, Death needs two keys, held by Heaven and Hell. The Crowfather adds that the Council feared that if the Horsemen learned about the Well's power, they might resurrect their kin.

Death first seeks the key held by the angels and is sent to an outpost of Heaven called Lostlight. At the Ivory Tower, he meets the Archon, who directs Death to the Ivory Citadel, which has been claimed by Corruption. The Archon sends Death to Earth to bring back a powerful holy weapon, so the way to the Ivory Citadel could be cleared. On Earth, Death encounters remnants of the Hellguard being led by Uriel. With their help, Death reassembles the shattered rod. After traveling to the Ivory Citadel and confronting its custodian, Death realizes the Archon has possessed the key the entire time and has fallen to Corruption himself. Returning to Lostlight, Death confronts the Archon, kills him, and acquires the first key.

Death then proceeds to Shadow's Edge, which is being devoured by Corruption. Searching for the demon lord, Samael, Death finds Lilith, a demon-queen who created the Nephilim; she refers to herself as Death's mother, which he angrily denies. Lilith claims Samael is gone , (Note: Having been imprisoned on Earth, as shown during the events of Darksiders) and can only be met by utilizing a time portal. Before he leaves, Lilith urges Death to revive the Nephilim when he finds the Well of Souls. After traversing the fortress through time, Death finally meets Samael, who tests him in a fierce battle, and gives the key expecting "an interesting show".

Death returns to the Tree of Life and the Crowfather reminds him that the fates of humanity and the Nephilim are at stake, and warns that Corruption has chosen a named champion to block Death.

Death proceeds into the Well of Souls, where he is met by Absalom, who taunts Death claiming him "blackened by the sin of betrayal" to explain his imperviousness to the Corruption; Death kills Absalom again. The Crowfather appears and explains that Death may tap the Well's power to restore one race, but a sacrifice is needed: choosing one race will forever doom the other. Death chooses to save War and sacrifices the souls of the Nephilim, and his own, for humanity, and leaps into the Well. An epilogue retells the final moments of the first game, with Uriel questioning War's intent to go to war with the Charred Council alone, to which War replies "No, not alone". The scene shows the arrival of the Four Horsemen, Death among them, as the narrator states "the number of the riders shall ever be four".

In a post-credit scene, Lilith is berated by a being in shadow (strongly implied to be Lucifer), angered that humanity has been restored and the Nephilim lost forever. The screen fades as Lilith screams in agony.

== Development and release ==
After its critical and commercial success of the original game, THQ's creative director Luis Gigliotti revealed in an interview with GameAxis that Darksiders would be a franchise and that they were contemplating a sequel.

An article on the Official Xbox Magazine website confirmed that Darksiders II was expected to be released in 2012. Darksiders II became the launch title for the then-upcoming Wii U with modifications necessary to fit the controls of the Nintendo console as well as some new features unique to the console.

The game takes Death across multiple dungeons and city hubs. City hubs feature NPCs who can give out side-quests etc. One city hub connects to a number of dungeons and one city area features more dungeons than the whole of the original Darksiders. Loot is also included, dropping from encounters as rewards ranging from 12 different armor piece categories, which can have different enchantments and may power up Death's Wrath Powers.

Michael Wincott provided the voice of Death. James Cosmo (who appeared as a priest in "The Last Sermon", a live-action trailer for the game) provided the voice of Maker Elder Eideard, Death's guide throughout the story.

Pre-order DLC bonuses for the game were also announced, for GameStop, Best Buy and Amazon. Darksiders II was originally to be released in June 2012, but was delayed to August.

In Japan, the game was published and localized by Spike Chunsoft.

A ported port of Darksiders II known as the Deathinitive Edition was released for PlayStation 4 and Xbox One in October 2015. It was published by Nordic Games, which had acquired the rights to the Darksiders franchise following the bankruptcy of THQ. The port was developed by Gunfire Games, a studio that was founded by Darksiders creator David Adams following the closure of Crytek USA (which itself was established after the closure of Vigil by THQ) and consists almost entirely of Vigil staff. Along with higher-resolution graphics and a revamped lighting engine, the studio also made changes to adjust the balance of the game. The PC version was also released later in November. A port of the Deathinitive Edition to the Nintendo Switch was released in September 2019, and one was released for Google Stadia in September 2021.

=== Downloadable content ===
A season pass was available and included The Abyssal Forge (a story-driven installment taking place in the Shadow Lands), The Demon Lord Belial (another story-driven installment taking place on Earth) and The Maker Armor and Scythe Set. Argul's Tomb is another story-driven pack not included in the season pass. The Angel of Death Pack included new enhanced weapons and armor along with a new visual effect for Dust. The Deadly Despair pack offered a speed boost to Death's horse Despair. Various other DLC packs have been released offering weapons and armor much like the Angel of Death pack.

The Deathinitive Edition of the game, released on PlayStation 4 and Xbox One, include these story expansions as well as extra equipment.

== Reception ==
Reception

Aggregate score
Aggregator	Score
Metacritic	PC: 81/100; PS3: 84/100; X360: 83/100; WIIU: 85/100; PS4: 72/100; XONE: 75/100; NS: 77/100

Review scores
Publication	Score
Computer Games Magazine	7.5/10
Computer and Video Games	7.5/10
G4	4.5/5
Game Informer	9/10
GameRevolution	7/10
GameSpot	(PC) 8/10 (X360) 8.5/10 (PS3) 8.5/10 (Wii U) 8/10
GamesTM	7/10
Giant Bomb	4/5
IGN	7.5/10
Jeuxvideo.com	16/20
Nintendo Life	8/10
Nintendo World Report	8.5/10
Official Xbox Magazine (UK)	7/10
PC Gamer (US)	77/100
Push Square	8/10
VentureBeat	89/100

Darksiders II received positive reviews. Aggregating review website Metacritic gave the Wii U version 85/100, the PlayStation 3 version 84/100, the Xbox 360 version 83/100, and the PC version 81/100. IGN gave it a score of 7.5, saying that despite its problems, Darksiders II is simply a "fun" game.

During the 16th Annual D.I.C.E. Awards, the Academy of Interactive Arts & Sciences nominated Darksiders II for "Adventure Game of the Year".

The game was the best selling game in August 2012 with over 247,000 units sold in the United States. As of November 2012, the game had only sold 1.5 million copies, with THQ stating that the game "did not perform to our expectations".

GameSpot highlighted the game's increasingly complex dungeon puzzles and equipment system, while noting that some boss encounters were too easy and that technical issues affected performance.

PC Gamer praised its combat and exploration but criticised the relatively lightweight platforming and puzzles.

Despite its generally favourable critical reception, the game fell short of its publisher's commercial expectations. In November 2012, Game Informer reported that THQ had shipped 1.4 million copies by the end of September 2012 and that sales had been below expectations.

== Sequel ==
A third Darksiders game was originally planned by Vigil Games, but the franchise was halted due to financial complications. Its parent company, THQ, filed for bankruptcy in 2012. The company's assets were sold at an auction, excluding Vigil Games, which was shut down along with the parent company THQ. In April 2013, THQ began a process to auction off the remaining IP that it had not yet sold, including Darksiders. Several companies publicly expressed interest in bidding for the franchise, including the Japanese developer PlatinumGames, and Crytek USA, a Crytek subsidiary led by former Vigil CEO David Adams, and primarily staffed by former Vigil employees. Adams had expressed interest in allowing Darksiders to come back "home" to its creators. Darksiders, along with Red Faction and MX vs. ATV, was purchased by Nordic Games in the final transaction of THQ's assets.

The third installment, Darksiders III, was released on November 27, 2018.
