= Soulslike =

Video game genre

A Soulslike (also spelled Souls-like or Souls like; Japanese: ソウルライク) is a subgenre of action role-playing games known for large worlds filled with enemies and emphasis on environmental storytelling, sometimes in a dark fantasy setting. Japanese developer and publisher FromSoftware and director Hidetaka Miyazaki are largely considered to have created and established the subgenre, pioneering it with Demon's Souls (2009) and further popularizing it with similar subsequent games, including the popular Dark Souls trilogy (2011–2016), from which the genre's name is derived. These games and subsequent FromSoftware releases are often called Soulsborne games, a portmanteau of their Souls-titled games and Bloodborne (2015).

While the Soulslike description is typically applied to action role-playing games, the core concepts of high difficulty, repeated character death driving player knowledge and mastery of the game world and pattern recognition, sparsity of save points, and giving information to the player through indirect, environmental storytelling are sometimes seen in games of very different genres, the mechanics of which are sometimes described as Soulslike.

== Gameplay ==
Soulslike games typically have a high level of difficulty where repeated player character death is expected and incorporated as part of the gameplay, with players often keeping part of their progress, like items collected and bosses defeated, since the last checkpoint. Other losses (such as experience or currency) are potentially recoverable. Soulslike games usually have ways to permanently improve the player character's abilities to progress further, often using a type of currency that can be earned and spent but may be lost or abandoned between deaths if not properly managed, similar to the souls in the Dark Souls series. The need for repeated playthroughs can be viewed as a type of self-improvement for the player, either through gradual improvement of their character, or improving their own skills and strategies within the game.

Salt and Sanctuary developer James Silva said Soulslike games provided "deliberate and meaningful exploration" of the entire game, including the game world, character improvement, and combat, through learning by repeated failures. Combat in Soulslike games may also be methodical, requiring the player to monitor stamina to avoid overexertion of their character, and often is based on "animation priority" actions that prevent the player from cancelling movement until the animation has been played out, leaving them vulnerable to enemy attacks. Souls and its related games developed by FromSoftware include multiplayer features such as the ability to write messages that can be seen and rated by other players, apparitions of other players, blood stains that allow viewing of other players' deaths, invasion of other players' worlds, and summoning of other players to one's own world for assistance.

A player character in Dark Souls using a bonfire

Many Soulslike games use checkpoint systems associated with the bonfires of Dark Souls. These checkpoints typically serve as respawn or recovery points and may also allow players to level up or fast travel between discovered locations, while resting at them may reset enemies. Similar checkpoints may be represented differently in other games. Such systems help avoid an outright failure state while preserving a risk-and-reward structure around death, recovery, and exploration.

== Common themes ==
These games are commonly noted for their lack of overt storytelling, as well as their deep worldbuilding, with a captivating world being cited as key to spark players' desire to explore. Players are meant to discover bits and pieces of the game's lore over time via environmental storytelling, item descriptions and cryptic dialogue, piecing it together themselves to increase the game's sense of mystery. Despite their dark themes, the settings of Soulslikes sometimes feature elements of comic relief, such as unexpected interactions (e.g. petting a cat), humorous reactions from non-player characters, peculiar outfits and weapons, and unusual, often slapstick means of death, such as being eaten by a Mimic.

== History ==
The Soulslike genre emerged from FromSoftware's Demon's Souls (2009) and Dark Souls (2011), from which the genre's name is derived. The games helped establish and popularize design conventions associated with the genre, including difficult combat, hostile environments, limited checkpoints, recoverable resources lost on death, and indirect storytelling through world design and atmosphere. Later FromSoftware games, including Bloodborne, Sekiro: Shadows Die Twice and Elden Ring, have also been discussed in relation to the Soulslike genre or the related Soulsborne label.

== Notable examples ==
Other notable Soulslike games include:

- Lords of the Fallen (2014)
- Titan Souls (2015)
- DarkMaus (2016)
- Salt and Sanctuary (2016)
- Nioh (2017)
- The Surge (2017)
- Darksiders III (2018)
- Ashen (2018)
- The Surge 2 (2019)
- Code Vein (2019)
- Dark Devotion (2019)
- Outward (2019)
- Remnant: From the Ashes (2019)
- Mortal Shell (2020)
- Hellpoint (2020)
- Nioh 2 (2020)
- Chronos: Before the Ashes (2020)
- Thymesia (2022)
- Stranger of Paradise: Final Fantasy Origin (2022)
- Lies of P (2023)
- Lords of the Fallen (2023)
- Wo Long: Fallen Dynasty (2023)
- Remnant 2 (2023)
- Another Crab's Treasure (2024)
- Enotria: The Last Song (2024)
- The First Berserker: Khazan (2025)
- Wuchang: Fallen Feathers (2025)
- Code Vein II (2026)
- Nioh 3 (2026)
- Lords of the Fallen II (2026) (upcoming)
- Valor Mortis (2026) (upcoming)

Other games not always classified as Soulslikes that have been cited as influenced by the Souls series include:

- Journey (2012)
- Shovel Knight (2014)
- Destiny (2014)
- The Witcher 3: Wild Hunt (2015)
- Hollow Knight (2017)
- Nier: Automata (2017)
- God of War (2018)
- Dead Cells (2018)
- Death's Gambit (2018)
- Blasphemous (2019)
- Star Wars Jedi: Fallen Order (2019)
- Tunic (2022)
- Star Wars Jedi: Survivor (2023)
- Flintlock: The Siege of Dawn (2024)
- Rise of the Ronin (2024)
- Stellar Blade (2024)
- Mina the Hollower (2026)

== Reception ==
=== "Soulslike" label ===
The term "Soulslike" received some criticism early on. In 2017, Austin Wood of PC Gamer criticized the Soulslike label, saying that treating Souls games as a template "misleads" players into believing that various games classified as such are similar to Souls when they are really different. He called the Soulslike label, along with the Metroidvania and roguelike labels, "jargon" that "ignores what makes [the games] unique". Also in 2017, Mark Brown of Game Maker's Toolkit decried the subgenre as overly restrictive, forcing games to fall into a certain template and preventing their design from advancing. In responding to this argument, Bruno Dias of Vice disagreed, saying that Brown's comparison of Soulslikes with roguelikes was not apt because roguelikes were a hobbyist pursuit for a long time. He also said that Soulslikes did not need to advance yet, as they did not have a marketability problem.

Interviews with developers of Soulslike games in 2020 revealed that they all thought of being classified as part of the genre as a positive thing that functioned as a useful description for players. However, some believed that it could be misleading, causing players to expect certain things and be disappointed when a game does not have them. An example of this was players being disappointed that Remnant: From the Ashes was primarily a shooter, despite being characterized as a Soulslike.
