= Darksiders III =

2018 video game

- Developer: Gunfire Games
- Publisher: THQ Nordic
- Director: David Adams
- Producer: Reinhard Pollice
- Designers: James Beech; Nicolas Fikac; Marcus Luna DeLeon; Cindy To; Richard Vorodi
- Writer: Man of Action
- Composer: Cris Velasco
- Series: Darksiders
- Engine: Unreal Engine 4
- Platforms: PlayStation 4; Windows; Xbox One; Stadia; Nintendo Switch
- Release: PlayStation 4, Windows, Xbox One; November 27, 2018; Stadia; September 14, 2021; Nintendo Switch; September 30, 2021
- Genre: Action role-playing
- Mode: Single-player

Darksiders III is an action role-playing game developed by Gunfire Games and published by THQ Nordic. The game was released for PlayStation 4, Windows, and Xbox One in November 2018. A Stadia version and Nintendo Switch port released in September 2021. It is the third entry in the Darksiders series.

Darksiders III departs somewhat from the beat-em-up gameplay of the previous entries and incorporates more elements from Metroidvanias and Soulslikes. Taking place parallel to the first Darksiders game, the player controls Fury, one of the Four Horsemen of the Apocalypse, in her quest to capture the seven deadly sins which have taken corporeal form and escaped imprisonment. In their quest, players can use a variety of melee and magical weapons and gain experience points and currency to upgrade Fury's powers and weapons.

Darksiders III received mixed reviews from critics, who highlighted the technical issues and bugs on both PC and console versions, as well as the too simplistic combat and puzzle systems.

== Gameplay ==
Darksiders III is a departure from the previous games, borrowing structure and gameplay elements from Metroidvanias and Soulslikes, and the game is viewed as a mashup of elements of previous games and a new direction. Players take control of Fury, sister of War and Death, two of the Four Horsemen of the Apocalypse, from a third-person perspective. Fury, a mage who is described as the most unpredictable and enigmatic of the Four Horsemen, relies on whips, swords, flails, daggers and magic in combat. Fury can take on multiple different elemental forms in order to enhance her combat capabilities by granting her new weapons, attacks and traversal abilities.

The combat is described as more methodical and straight forward, not focusing on large crowds of enemies like the previous games and removing the hit counter. Enemies are stronger than in previous installments but appear in smaller numbers during encounters, so as to make battles feel more personal. Some enemies from previous games return, while other foes are new. Gated combat is not a feature, in an attempt to make everything within the setting contextualized and interconnected like the Dark Souls series.

Darksiders III focuses on its leveling system in which Fury's damage, health, and arcane damage can be upgraded. The threats of the game's world will grow stronger as the player progresses through the story. Similar to War, yet dissimilar to Death, Fury collects souls from enemies and from objects in the environment, as a form of currency or an expendable resource. The player can attach "Enhancement"s to Fury's weapons for different perks and damage boosts.

The game takes place in a continuous environment where exploration plays a large role in gathering more lurchers and materials to upgrade Fury herself and her arsenal. While exploring, Fury must solve simple puzzles and overcome platforming obstacles, some of which make use of her whip. Such puzzles include using bombs to blow up obstructed pathways or Fury's Forms to interact with the environment.

== Plot ==
Taking place parallel to the events of Darksiders II and before the majority of Darksiders, Fury, one of the Four Horsemen of the Apocalypse is summoned by the Charred Council, a group of mythical beings tasked with upholding the Balance in the universe. They task her with hunting down the Seven Deadly Sins, which have escaped imprisonment and assign her a Watcher to ensure she fulfills her task.

Upon arriving on the war-torn, post-apocalyptic Earth, Fury encounters and defeats the first of the Sins, Envy. She claims one of her talismans and uses it as a prison to hold Envy before venturing to a sanctuary named Haven, where she encounters Ulthane, a member of the Maker race, and some humans who survived the Apocalypse. Ulthane asks Fury to send any humans she finds to Haven. She then leaves to find the next Sin, Wrath, who mortally wounds her when she is distracted by the death of her horse, Rampage. A portal opens up below her and takes her to the Lord of the Hollows, a powerful entity with the ability to release other beings from the cycle of life, death and rebirth in the Well of Souls. He heals her and reveals that she is being manipulated by the Charred Council for their own schemes. He aids her by giving her the Fire Hollow, a mystical artifact that enhances her combat abilities and asks her to hunt down the demon Abraxis and return to him with the demon's soul.

As Fury continues to capture the Sins, the Lord of Hollows gifts her with new Hollows to aid in her mission which allow her to manipulate different elements. Fury confronts Abraxis in his stronghold who tells her that a new dark lord only known as "The Destroyer" is coming. Players can then choose to believe Abraxis or to kill Abraxis. Returning Abraxis' soul to the Lord makes him reveal that he was once part of the Charred Council but left over disagreements on how to enforce the Balance since the Kingdom of Man was ignored among the fights of Heaven and Hell. The Lord of Hollows will die regardless of the player's choice but siding with him grants Fury a Sigil with unknown properties.

Eventually Fury confronts and defeats the final Sin, Pride who reveals that the Council have been secretly betraying the Balance behind everyone's backs from the start. At this point, the Watcher reveals herself to be the real Envy, having tricked Fury and the Council to strengthen herself by absorbing the rest of the sins into her amulet, gaining their powers. She uses her talisman to immobilize Fury and drain her powers, while informing her that the Council tried to pit Horsemen versus Sins in the hopes that they would annihilate each other.

Fury falls to Earth but is saved by humans she helped to rescue. Ulthane then reveals that he constructed a Reflecting Pool, a gateway that allows Fury to confront both Envy and the Charred Council. She then reveals her acquisition of the Hollow Lord's gift to the maker, who is awestruck at the sight of it, but refuses when offered the relic out of shame for past misdeeds, before Fury travels to the Council chamber and defeats Envy. Not long after the Council turns on her but the rider ultimately holds back her former handlers by detonating the Talisman of Sin and retreating back to Earth. If she obtained the Sigil from the Lord of Hollows, she will first use it to block the Council's attacks, revealing that the Council is afraid of the artifact.

Returning to Earth, Fury helps the Makers to defend the humans' escaping through the Reflecting Pool to another realm while demons attack Haven. Fury decides to follow the humans as their new protector, after asking Ulthane to help War if the two of them ever meet (a reference to the events of the first Darksiders). Before leaving, a human helping to defend the Makers from the attack is revealed to be a disguised Strife, one of the other Horseman. With the survivors now safe and hidden away in another realm, it is revealed that the demon lord Lucifer knows what Fury has done and, depending on the player's choices, is either pleased that the Sigil was not created and that everything is going according to plan, or irritated that the Sigil may threaten his plans, and angered at his compatriot Lilith for not silencing the Lord of Hollows when she had the chance.

== Development and release ==
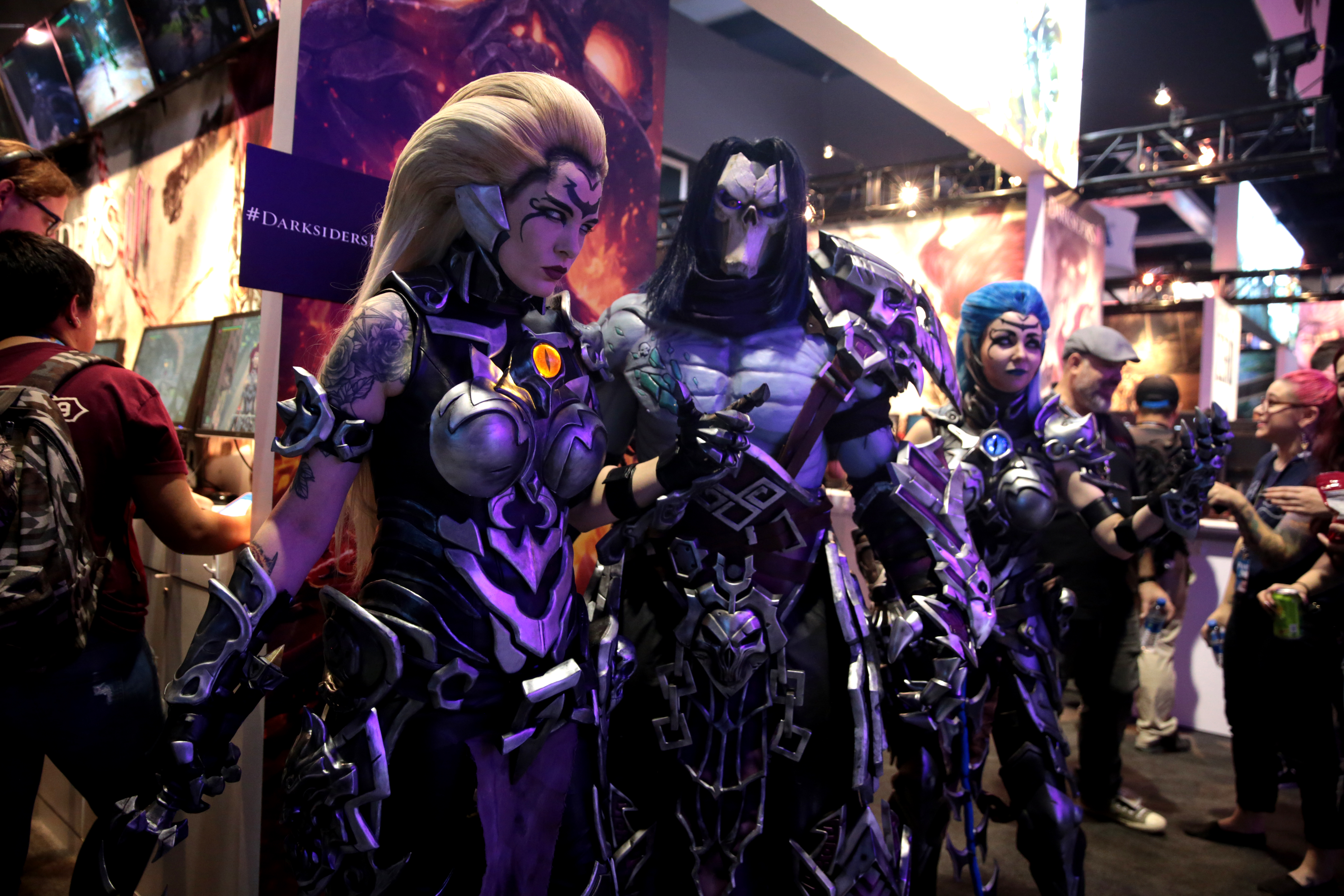
Promotion at the 2018 PAX West

A third entry in the Darksiders series was originally planned by Vigil Games, but the fate of its franchise was threatened due to financial complications. Its parent company, THQ, filed for bankruptcy in 2012. The company's assets were sold at an auction, excluding Vigil Games, which was shut down along with the parent company, THQ. In April 2013, THQ began a process to auction off the remaining IP that it had not yet sold, including Darksiders. Several companies publicly expressed interest in bidding for the franchise, including the Japanese developer PlatinumGames, and Crytek USA, a new Crytek subsidiary led by former Vigil CEO David Adams, and primarily staffed by former Vigil employees. Adams had expressed interest in allowing Darksiders to come back "home" to its creators. Darksiders, along with Red Faction and MX vs. ATV, were purchased by Nordic Games in the final transaction of THQ's assets in April 22; Nordic Games expressed interest to develop the third installment due to its popularity with the fans. The game was published by THQ Nordic and developed by Gunfire Games. The development team largely consists of former Vigil Games employees whose previous work includes development of the first two Darksiders games. The game was released on November 27, 2018. Alongside it, THQ Nordic presented various editions for the game; a deluxe edition, which came with the soundtrack and two future downloadable content packs, the Collector's Edition, which came with a Fury figurine, and the Apocalypse edition, with figurines of War, Death, Fury and Vulgrim.

A month after the game's release, a patch was released for the game adding a "Classic" mode to make the game 'feel' more like its two predecessor games, such as allowing Fury to dodge, interrupt her attacks and use items instantly.

Two DLC packs were released in 2019: The Crucible on February 26 and Keepers of the Void on July 16.

== Reception ==
=== Critical response ===
Reception

Aggregate score
Aggregator	Score
Metacritic	PC: 70/100; PS4: 64/100; XONE: 69/100; NS: 58/100

Review scores
Publication	Score
Computer Games Magazine	4/10
Destructoid	8/10
Electronic Gaming Monthly	3/5
Game Informer	8/10
GameRevolution	4/10
GamesRadar+	3.5/5
IGN	7/10
Nintendo Life	4/10
PC Gamer (US)	62/100
Push Square	6/10
RPGamer	3/5
Shacknews	8/10

Darksiders III received "mixed or average" reviews from critics, according to review aggregator website Metacritic. The game was widely criticized for the technical issues in both consoles and PC versions of the game.

Eurogamer's review criticized the "straight forward combat" saying it is a matter of "upgrade weapon damage" and that the few puzzles are too simple, and in concluding that it "has done better in the past".

GameSpot's review said that the game is "unfocused", that the "clear inspiration from Dark Souls" go against the rest of the series design, that the game has "rudimentary puzzles" and concludes by saying that "Darksiders 3 retrogrades on its predecessors with an unfocused approach that constantly clashes itself".

PC Gamer's review said that the game doesn't commit itself enough on the RPG department due to the game's lack of a loot system and weapons being earned as the plot goes on. He ends his review saying that "it doesn't condemn Darksiders to oblivion, but it's the lowlight of the series so far".

=== Sales ===
Darksiders III debuted at 32nd place in the United Kingdom's all-format sales charts. According to reports, the game managed to sell 71,000 units on Steam alone in its first week. In February 2019, THQ Nordic said that it had made back its development and marketing budget and reiterated their commitment to the franchise.

== Sequel ==
Prior to the game's release, the CEO of THQ Nordic said that if Darksiders III reached over 100,000 copies sold, the company would look into a sequel. A spin-off game was released in 2019, titled Darksiders Genesis.
