= Darksiders Genesis =

2019 action role-playing video game

- Developer: Airship Syndicate
- Publisher: THQ Nordic
- Directors: Joe Madureira; Ryan Stefanelli
- Producers: Andy Hansen; Ron LaJoie
- Designers: Steve Madureira; Clint Bogue
- Programmers: Christopher S. Brooks; DJ Hirko
- Artists: Jesse Carpenter; Grace Liu; Baldi Konijn
- Writer: Frank Barbiere
- Composer: Gareth Coker
- Series: Darksiders
- Engine: Unreal Engine 4
- Platforms: Stadia; Windows; Nintendo Switch; PlayStation 4; Xbox One
- Release: Stadia, Windows: WW: 5 December 2019; Nintendo Switch, PlayStation 4, Xbox One: WW: 14 February 2020
- Genres: Hack and slash, role-playing
- Modes: Single-player, multiplayer

Darksiders Genesis is a top-down hack and slash action role-playing video game developed by American studio Airship Syndicate and published by THQ Nordic. It was released for Stadia and Windows on 5 December 2019, and on Nintendo Switch, PlayStation 4, and Xbox One on 14 February 2020. The game is considered a spin-off prequel game in the Darksiders series and introduces the fourth Horseman of the Apocalypse, Strife, as the protagonist. Strife can summon his brother, War. Upon release, the game received positive reviews, with many reviewers praising the combat.

== Plot ==
After the Four Horsemen have attacked and decimated the Nephilim in Eden, they are summoned by the Charred Council. The Council suspects that the demon king Lucifer is planning something with Samael to upset the Balance and orders War and Strife to investigate. After invading Samael's keep, they find it under attack from another Master of Hell, albeit a lesser one: Moloch. Samael informs them that he is not in league with Lucifer and the current attack on him is the result of that. Before he can say anything else, Moloch attacks and Samael teleports the Horsemen to the Void to find and talk to his associate.

The Horsemen travel through the Void and find Vulgrim to be the associate Samael spoke of. Vulgrim informs them that he can help track down Lucifer but he needs several artifacts. After collecting the required artifacts Vulgrim informs them that Lucifer has paid a visit to Mammon, another Master of Hell. Samael arrives at this point and suggests that the Horsemen find Mammon and make him talk about Lucifer. They find Mammon with several relics and weapons from Eden. After killing him, the Horsemen return to Vulgrim and Samael where they learn that Lucifer has opened a path to Eden, bringing its sacred water and turning it into poison. The demon Belial is in charge of this operation. After stopping the operation, they confront and defeat Belial but spare him. After the Horsemen leave, Lucifer arrives and punishes him.

The Horsemen learn that Dagon, the Drowned King is also helping Lucifer as the latter has offered Eden to him. Meanwhile, they meet Abaddon, the guardian angel of Eden. He informs them that Lucifer is spreading corruption and asks them to help him cleanse Eden. Afterwards, the Horsemen track down and kill Dagon. They return to the Void and Samael advises them to destroy the source of Moloch's power before they attack him. They do so and together with Samael, they attack and kill Moloch. However, before his death, Moloch tells them that Lucifer's plan is complete and Samael knows about it.

After returning to the Void, Samael tells the Horsemen that Lucifer had asked for the souls of the Masters of Hell after their death in exchange for their services. Samael also tells them that Lilith is plotting with Lucifer as well and together they have made an artifact called the "Animus" which is fueled by the souls of the Masters of Heaven and Hell who had accepted Lucifer's offer. This artifact is used on Earth to corrupt mankind, turning them into the volatile and self-destructive species they grow to become later on. The Horsemen go to Earth to find mankind living in sin and realize that they have helped Lucifer achieve his goal. Lucifer talks to them through a human child and tells the Horsemen that the corruption of humankind is spreading and cannot be stopped.

Afterwards, they return to the Charred Council who declares that humankind needs to be watched as a Third Kingdom. They then forge the Seven Seals as a treaty to uphold the balance between Heaven and Hell: three of them coming from the demonic planes and three more coming from the angelic keeps and one from the Council itself. They declare whoever breaks the treaty shall suffer the wrath of the Horsemen, setting the stage for the future games.

== Gameplay ==
Played from a top-down perspective, the game allows players to switch between Strife and War at any time. Strife uses his pistols, Mercy and Redemption while War uses his sword, Chaos Eater. Alternatively, two players can play the game in a co-op mode with each player taking the role of one of the characters. Once the player has killed enough enemies, they are allowed to use burst abilities which allow them to take down enemies quicker. The game currency is souls which can be earned by killing enemies that will spawn before the player. Platforming elements similar to previous games make a return and certain gameplay mechanics such as bombs are present too.

== Development ==
The game was revealed by publisher THQ Nordic in the run-up to E3 2019 at 6 June. Unlike Darksiders III, Genesis is developed by Airship Syndicate, who previously developed Battle Chasers: Nightwar. This studio consists of developers of the defunct Vigil Games, who developed the first two Darksiders titles. Genesis is a spin-off title, whereas unlike its main series games, it takes on a top-down perspective and is more of a looter game, compared to games like Diablo.

== Reception ==
=== Critical response ===
Reception

Aggregate scores
Aggregator	Score
Metacritic	PC: 77/100; PS4: 77/100; NS: 74/100; XONE: 77/100
OpenCritic	74% recommend

Review scores
Publication	Score
Game Informer	6.5/10
GameSpot	7/10
GamesRadar+	3.5/5
Hardcore Gamer	4/5
IGN	8.7/10
Nintendo Life	7/10
Nintendo World Report	8/10
PC Gamer (US)	87/100
Push Square	6/10
Shacknews	9/10

Darksiders Genesis received generally positive reviews. Aggregating review website Metacritic gave the PC version 77/100, the PlayStation 4 version 78/100 and the Xbox One version 77/100. Fellow review aggregator OpenCritic assessed that the game received strong approval, being recommended by 74% of critics.

IGN gave it a score of 8.7 out of 10, stating that "Darksiders Genesis may lack the polish and flair of its numbered brethren, but make no mistake: this is still a Darksiders game, and it's one of the best. There's a really strong balance of great combat, clever puzzles, rich exploration, and excellent progression mechanics that keep its momentum going strong through its entire 15-hour run time". Furthermore, Cian Maher of GameSpot gave the game 7 out of 10, praising the combat, art and writing, while criticizing the overhead camera.

Writing for Game Informer, Ben Reeves gave the game 6.5 out of 10, praising the combat and puzzles but mentioning the story and offbeat design as negative aspects. Mike Epstein of GamesRadar+ also commended the combat, while criticizing collision bugs as well as the story. Luke Kemp of PC Gamer gave the game 87/100 and praised the grinding elements as well as the combat. Writing for Nintendo Life, PJ O'Reilly gave the Nintendo Switch version of the game a positive review, scoring it a 7/10. In the review, O'Reilly praises the fighting, unlockable skills and the "satisfying mixture of combat, puzzling and light platforming", although giving similar criticism as previous reviewers. Conversely, Polygon's Laura Dale gave the game a mixed review, praising the boss fights but was critical towards the puzzles and the "constant combat".

=== Sales ===
According to Lars Wingefors, CEO of the Embracer Group, the parent company of publisher THQ Nordic, Darksiders Genesis sold well at launch and is as of 2020 still selling well. Wingefors also said that the sales of the game exceeded the publisher's expectations.
