= Remnant: From the Ashes =

2019 video game

- Developer: Gunfire Games
- Publisher: Perfect World Entertainment (Note: Published by THQ Nordic for the Nintendo Switch)
- Director: David Adams
- Designers: Nicolas Fikac; Anthony Norcott; Cindy To; Richard Vorodi
- Composer: Rob Westwood
- Engine: Unreal Engine 4
- Platforms: Microsoft Windows; PlayStation 4; Xbox One; Nintendo Switch
- Release: Windows, PS4, Xbox One; August 20, 2019; Nintendo Switch; March 21, 2023
- Genres: Action role-playing, third-person shooter
- Modes: Single-player, multiplayer

Remnant: From the Ashes is an action role-playing video game developed by Gunfire Games and published by Perfect World Entertainment. The game was released for PlayStation 4, Windows, and Xbox One in August 2019, followed by a Nintendo Switch port released in March 2023. It received generally positive reviews from critics and sold over 3 million units by December 2021. A sequel, Remnant 2, was released in July 2023.

== Gameplay ==
Remnant: From the Ashes borrows its mechanics from franchises such as the Dark Souls series, but rather than simply being melee combat, it incorporates a third-person shooter element where the player can wield up to two gun weapons, one main weapon and one side arm, alongside their melee weapon. These weapons can vary between machine guns, shotguns, hunting rifles, sniper rifles and the like, and can also attach mods to them which give players extra abilities, such as teleportation. Players can create their own custom character, and are required to defeat challenging enemies and bosses found throughout a randomly generated world, though the player still follows a set story. Players are able to upgrade their weapons and armor using materials they find throughout the world. They can also unlock trait points, which can be used to increase the stats of their playable character.

Remnant allows players to team up with two others and progress through the story, where the game scales the difficulty based on how many players are in the game. The way this works is that if a player joins another player's game, while the joining player will earn the same loot as the original player, once the joining player returns to their world, they are required to progress through the story again. This is because different elements found in one player's world may not be the same in another player's; this can vary according to which enemies and which bosses a player encounters. Unlike other similar titles, players do not lose any items or skill points upon death, but are taken back to the checkpoint, where each time the enemies may differ in number or type, thus keeping a variety in gameplay.

== Plot ==
Remnant: From the Ashes takes place in a post-apocalyptic Earth that has been devastated and overrun by an interdimensional evil called the Root. The player is a wandering survivor of the apocalypse driven to put an end to the Root by traveling to a tower on an island that appears to be the epicenter of the invasion. Early in their journey they are brought to Ward 13, an underground bunker where human survivors live. The player is tasked with finding Ward 13's founder, Ford, and explores the devastated Earth city before finding a portal to an interdimensional rift known as the Labyrinth, allowing them to travel between worlds in search of Ford.

The player first travels to Rhom, the deserted remains of a once great civilization that destroyed its world to save itself from the Root. They unlock a monolithic tower in which the former ruler of Rhom, the Undying King, tasks the player with traveling to the swamp planet of Corsus to kill its Guardian - a being that protects the planet from invasive forces such as the Root - and bring him its heart so he can birth a new Guardian for Rhom, in exchange for pointing the player in Ford's direction. On Corsus, the player kills the Guardian and is given the choice of delivering the heart to the King, or giving it to the Iskal Queen, the ruler of a parasitic insectoid hive mind that has taken over the planet's former inhabitants. If the player chooses the latter, they are forced to kill the King before proceeding.

The player then travels to the forest world of Yaesha, where they encounter a civil war between its Satyr-like inhabitants and befriend a group of rebels. After some exploration, they find Ford imprisoned and free him. In exchange, Ford gives the player a key to activate a portal deep within Ward 13 that allows them to travel to the tower, which was formerly the humans' Ward 17.

In Ward 13, the player can find information revealing that the Root were brought to Earth due to a failed series of experiments using the human subconscious as gateways to other worlds; the Root themselves are linked to one of their subjects, known as Dreamers. The player travels to Ward 17 through the portal and encounters the Dreamer, whom they battle and defeat within his own subconscious. The Dreamer transforms into a massive Root creature, which the player finally kills, releasing them from the Dreamer's subconscious and killing the Root at their source once and for all.

== Development ==
Remnant: From the Ashes was announced on July 28, 2018.

== Downloadable content ==
=== Swamps of Corsus ===
The first DLC for Remnant, Swamps of Corsus, was released on April 28, 2020. In addition to a roguelike-style survival mode, in which the player starts with nothing but a pistol and scrap and must upgrade and survive as long as they can, the expansion features new bosses, enemies, weapons, mods, and events added to the Corsus area of the campaign. Players can also purchase skins for their armor with a resource acquired in Survival or hard and nightmare difficulties.

=== Subject 2923 ===
The second DLC was released on August 20, 2020. With a focus on origins of "The Dreamers", this adds new areas and bosses.

== Reception ==
Reception

Aggregate score
| Aggregator | Score |
|---|---|
| Metacritic | PC: 78/100; PS4: 77/100; XONE: 81/100; NS: 70/100 |

Review scores
| Publication | Score |
|---|---|
| Destructoid | 7/10 |
| Game Informer | 8.5/10 |
| GameSpot | 7/10 |
| IGN | 8/10 |
| PC Gamer (US) | 77/100 |

Remnant: From the Ashes received "generally favorable" reviews from critics, while the Nintendo Switch version received "mixed or average" reviews, according to review aggregator website Metacritic.

IGN scored the game an 8/10, stating, "Remnant: From the Ashes delivers a beautifully deranged vision of the apocalypse that's overflowing with twisted creatures hellbent on making you suffer. The thrill of finally beating a boss that's had your number for hours is right up there with the Dark Souls games that so clearly inspired it, though the underwhelming gear system sometimes brings down the high of overcoming the frequent difficulty spikes. Overall, it's a solid game that offers one of the best and most rewarding co-op experiences in quite some time, as long as you have a hint of desire to challenge and punish yourself over and over." While GameSpot scored the game a 7/10, stating, "Confusing accurately describes Remnant: From the Ashes a lot of the time, especially when its combination of established ideas doesn't mesh. But for the most part, the experiment is a success, resulting in deeply satisfying combat against creative and challenging enemies. Remnant struggles to effectively transfer that success over to an engaging loot system and an interesting story to wrap it all up, but when you're blasting away foes with weapons crafted from the remains of your latest boss kill, it's hard not to do so with a wide smile on your face."

=== Sales ===
By October 2019, Remnant: From the Ashes had sold over 1 million units. By July 2020, the game had sold 1.6 million units, surpassing Gunfire Games' internal expectations. By December 2021, it had sold over 3 million units.

In February 2020, THQ Nordic announced that a physical edition would be made available on 17 March 2020. In Japan, the launch of the physical PlayStation 4 version placed it at fifth position of the individual-format sale charts, with 19,244 units sold.

== Prequel ==
A prequel, titled Chronos: Before the Ashes, was announced by THQ Nordic in September 2020 and was released for Microsoft Windows, PlayStation 4, Xbox One, Nintendo Switch and Stadia on December 1, 2020. It is an overhauled version of Gunfire Games' previous game, Chronos, originally released for the Oculus Rift virtual reality headset in 2016.

== Sequel ==
A sequel, Remnant 2, was announced at The Game Awards 2022. It was developed by Gunfire Games and published by Gearbox Publishing, and released on July 25, 2023 for Windows, PlayStation 5 and Xbox Series X/S.
