= Battle Chasers =

American fantasy comic book series

- Cover to Battle Chasers #1 by Joe Madureira

Publication information
- Publisher: WildStorm; Image Comics
- Format: Ongoing series
- Publication date: April 1998 – June 2023
- No. of issues: 12 (and one prelude issue)

Creative team
- Written by: Joe Madureira; Munier Sharrieff
- Artist(s): Adam Warren (back story in #6, 9); Ludo Lullabi (#10-12)
- Penciller: Joe Madureira
- Inkers: Tom McWeeney (Prelude, #1–7); Jason Martin (inker) (#7–9); Vince Russel (Prelude); Scott Williams (#7, 8); Tim Townsend (#7); Trevor Scott (#8); Joe Madureira (#9)
- Colorist: Liquid Graphics

Battle Chasers is an American fantasy comic book series written and illustrated by Joe Madureira. First published by Image Comics as part of WildStorm's Cliffhanger imprint (founded by Madureira with J. Scott Campbell and Humberto Ramos), the series left that imprint in 2001, after which was published by Image Comics' central office.

The series was characterized by scheduling problems, with an average of about six months between issues, including a delay of 16 months for issue #7. Madureira produced a total of nine issues in four years (publishing two to three a year), a pace for which he was criticized, before leaving the comic industry to pursue a career as a video game designer. The cliffhanger ending of issue #9 was not resolved for over 20 years; issue #10 was originally scheduled for November 2001, put on indefinite hiatus with Madureira's exit from the industry, and returned only as abstract plans and concept drawings from 2017 to early 2023. It was published in June 2023 and continued the plot after a two-page recap.

== Publication history ==
Battle Chasers was one of the initial three comic book series published under the Cliffhanger label, which Madureira founded with fellow artists J. Scott Campbell (Danger Girl) and Humberto Ramos (Crimson) for Jim Lee's Image Comics imprint, WildStorm. When, effective in 1999, WildStorm was sold to DC Comics, the Cliffhanger titles moved along, and issues 5 through 8 of Battle Chasers were published by DC, until Madureira left the publisher, and released Battle Chasers #9 through Image Comics. Madureira canceled Battle Chasers #10, and placed the series "on hold" after forming a game development company called Tri-Lunar with Tim Donley and Greg Peterson.

When it was revealed in August 2005 that Madureira would return to the comic industry, working on a then-unspecified project with Jeph Loeb for Marvel Comics (which was later revealed to be The Ultimates 3), he also stated that a conclusion to Battle Chasers is "one of those things that I think about every once in a while, and not having finished it bums me out… I would love to do it at some point, but it would be very far out". Joe Madureira said that he planned to release issue #10, starting directly where issue #9 ended, and two more issues as part of a 3-part story arc some time after the release of Battle Chasers: Nightwar in October 2017. After several years of further delays, he posted unlettered preview pages to Twitter in March 2021. Nearly two more years passed, and Image Comics published it in June 2023, featuring art by Lullabi and a new story arc.

== Plot ==
The story takes place in an "arcanepunk" setting. The story stars five main characters, including a ten-year-old girl named Gully, whose father mysteriously vanishes, leaving behind a pair of magical gloves. A rogue named Red Monika tries to enlist Garrison, a swordsman haunted by the death of his wife, to assist in freeing a prisoner, which Garrison turns down. Red Monika accidentally releases four extremely powerful villains during the breakout. Garrison overcomes his grief and joins Gully, the wizard Knolan, and the towering war golem Calibretto to stop the villains' rampage.

== Characters ==
Garrison
At the beginning of the series, Garrison is drunk in despair with the passing of his wife. He is a legendary swordsman and owns a powerful magical sword. He is trained in swordplay by Red Monika and mentored by Aramus. From Joe's original concept sketches of the characters, Garrison's sword was able to open similar to the ThunderCats' Sword of Omens.

Gully
Gully is a ten-year-old girl whose father, Aramus, mysteriously vanishes leaving a powerful set of magical gloves behind. Through the series she shares a friendship with Calibretto and Knolan while searching for her father.

Calibretto
An outlawed war golem with a very gentle personality, he is the last of his kind after all previous war golems were ordered to be destroyed. His arms can fire projectiles.

Knolan
A powerful wizard, approximately five hundred years old, who takes Gully under his wing. His companion is Calibretto, a war golem.

Red Monika
A voluptuous bounty hunter who originally trained Garrison, and has an apparent history with him. Madureira concept sketch notes refer to her as "sort of the Jessica Rabbit of the Battle Chasers world".

== Reception ==
Although issue #10 of Battle Chasers was not released as part of the initial run, it was 14th in the Top 300 comics list with an estimated pre-order of 60,860.

== Other media ==
=== Film adaptation ===
In March 2003, 20th Century Fox optioned feature rights to the fantasy comic book series with Gil Netter attached to produce. Stuart Hazeldine was considered to adapt the screenplay.

=== Battle Chasers: Nightwar ===
A turn-based role-playing game called Battle Chasers: Nightwar serves as a continuation and jumping-on point of the original comic book series. The game was developed by Airship Syndicate and published by THQ Nordic. Madureira was the CEO and Creative Director along with Ryan Stefanelli as President and Lead Designer; Steve Madureira as Animation Director; Christopher Brooks as Technical Director and Jesse Carpenter as Environment Lead. 2D animation scenes in the game were developed by Powerhouse Animation Studios. Nightwar was released for PC and Mac, both on Steam and DRM-free on GOG, Xbox One, PlayStation 4 in October 2017, with Nintendo Switch and Linux versions releasing in May 2018. During the Kickstarter campaign, new issues of the Battle Chasers comic book were offered with pledges starting at $90 and higher.

Calibretto also had been announced as a playable character in the game Indivisible before the dissolution of developer Lab Zero Games.

== Issues ==
=== Core issues ===
- Battle Chasers Prelude (1998, Image Comics/WildStorm)
- Story in Frank Frazetta Fantasy Illustrated #2 (1998, Quantum Cat Entertainment)
- Battle Chasers #1–4 (1998, Image Comics/Wildstorm)
- Battle Chasers #5–8 (1999–2001, DC Comics/Wildstorm)
- Battle Chasers #9 (2001, Image Comics)
- Battle Chasers #10-12 (2023, Image Comics)

=== Reprints ===
- Battle Chasers: Collected Edition #1 (reprints Battle Chasers #1–2)
- Battle Chasers: Collected Edition #2 (reprints Battle Chasers #3–4)
- Battle Chasers: A Gathering of Heroes (ISBN 1-56389-538-2; reprints Battle Chasers #1–5, the Prelude and the story from Frank Frazetta Fantasy Illustrated #2)
- Battle Chasers Anthology HC (reprints #0-9, featuring a few sketches and pages of the unprinted issues 10), April 2011
