= Remnant 2 =

2023 video game

- Developer: Gunfire Games
- Publisher: Gearbox Publishing
- Director: David Adams
- Designers: Jonathan Baldessari; Nicolas Fikac; Ryan Heaton; Teandre Roberts; Michael Smith; Cindy To; Richard Vorodi
- Writers: Kal-El Bogdanove; Adrienne Arno; Adam Heine
- Composer: Rob Westwood (Note: Additional music by Òscar Senén)
- Engine: Unreal Engine 5
- Platforms: PlayStation 5; Windows; Xbox Series X/S
- Release: July 25, 2023
- Genres: Third-person shooter, action role-playing
- Modes: Single-player, multiplayer

Remnant 2 is a third-person shooter action role-playing video game developed by Gunfire Games and published by Gearbox Publishing. A sequel to Remnant: From the Ashes, the game was released for PlayStation 5, Windows and Xbox Series X/S on July 25, 2023.

Remnant 2 received generally positive reviews from critics. The game sold over 1 million units during its first week after launch, and over 2 million units by September 2023. Three DLC packs for the game were released.

== Gameplay ==
Like its predecessor, Remnant 2 is a third-person shooter inspired by Soulslike video games. Players can wield up to two guns, alongside their melee weapon. At the beginning of the game, players can select their character archetypes. For instance, the Gunslinger class replaces the Ex-cultist class from the first game, and focuses on the use of firearms. The Challenger class can unleash a shockwave that disintegrates enemies, while the Handler class has a dog companion who will aid in combat. Players will gain the ability to dual class as they progress in the game. Players can also activate different archetype-specific perks and skills. For the Gunslinger, their unique ability is "Loaded", which instantly reloads all the firearms the character is carrying. For the Handler class, the prime perk ability is "Bonded", which allows their dog companion to revive the character after they have fallen in combat.

While the first game features procedural generation by changing a level's layout and enemy spawn points, it has been significantly expanded in Remnant 2. According to Gunfire Games, enemy types, the aesthetic of a region, boss characters, non-playable characters and the game's storyline and quests are also randomly generated. Players can play through the entire game solo, though the game also supports a three-player cooperative multiplayer mode.

== Synopsis ==
The game's story follows a nameless survivor dubbed ''Traveler'' who is surviving on the road with their friend Cass, who is suffering from an infection caused by the Root, a destructive plant-like species that spreads like a virus. During their travels, the two are ambushed by the Root and nearly killed, but at the last minute, they are saved by Clementine (Subject 2923) and taken to Ward 13, where the survivors now live outside the bunker. While Cass is being treated for her Root sickness, the Traveler meets with Andrew Ford, the founder of Ward 13, who takes him into the bunker of Ward 13, where he reveals and activates a dormant World Stone, a red crystal that acts as a portal to other realms, and his plan to destroy the Root. While instructing the Traveler to destroy the stone, he disappears into the stone shortly after touching it. When Clementine finds them, a mysterious entity pulls her through the World Stone. With Ford and Clementine both gone, the Traveler decides to use the World Stone to find them.

The Traveler is transported to one of three worlds: Yaesha, a green forest world now overrun by the Root; Losomn, a world suffering from the collision of two worlds that have now intertwined the cultures of two different species; and N'erud, a massive planet-sized starship built by a species called the Drzyr in their ill-fated quest to find life other than their own in the universe. Eventually, the Traveler finds a mysterious crystal called a Segment, which leads them to The Labyrinth, a place between worlds where they find Clementine, who was transported there by The Keeper, a being responsible for maintaining the safety of all worlds. The Traveler is tasked by the Keeper with stopping the Root, which seeks to destroy the multiverse.

They must find the segments of the other worlds, which eventually form into the Index, a device that unlocks a portal to Root Earth, a twisted alternative version of Earth completely consumed by the Root and also the birthplace of the Root. The Traveler, Clementine and the Keeper make their final stand against Annihilation, a physical embodiment of the Root, but they are unable to kill Annihilation as it keeps regenerating after being defeated. The Keeper explains reluctantly that there are only two options left: either let the Root corrupt the world, or reset the universe. Clementine retrieves the Index from the Keeper and draw the entire universe into herself and the Index, eradicating the Root in the process. In a post-credit scene, the Keeper watches the static Index floating in the abyss, though the Index bursts open, restoring the world to its original state.

== Development ==
Remnant 2 was officially announced by developer Gunfire Games and publisher Gearbox Publishing San Francisco during The Game Awards 2022. The game was released for PlayStation 5, Windows and Xbox Series X/S in July 2023. The story of the game is set after the final downloadable content released for Remnant: From the Ashes, though Gunfire deliberately kept the game's narrative simple to ensure that all players "have no trouble picking it up".

For Remnant 2, the team intended to significantly build on the foundations laid by Remnant: From the Ashes. Two main development goals were to expand gameplay variety using the archetype system, and increase the game's replay value through its procedural generation system. Explaining the system, David Adams, CEO of Gunfire Games, added that "at the top level we randomly generate the order of the biomes" that a player may encounter. The system will then generate "one of two unique storylines" in each biomes, and "all the mini bosses, side quests, events" within it. This helped ensure that players had more incentives to replay the game. As each players will have a distinct experience playing the game, the developer hoped that players would be inclined to share their game experience with their friends.

=== Downloadable content ===
The game's first downloadable content (DLC) pack, titled The Awakened King, was released on November 14, 2023; it features two additional songs by Trivium's Matt Heafy. Two more DLC packs are set to be released in 2024. All three packs are included in the game's Ultimate Edition. David Adams, President of Gunfire Games, also revealed in an interview that the team would love to explore a survival-like game mode in the future. The division of Gearbox Publishing which published the game, Gearbox Publishing San Francisco was rebranded into Arc Games following Gearbox's sale to Take-Two Interactive. The second DLC pack, The Forgotten Kingdom, was released on April 23, 2024. The last pack, titled The Dark Horizon, was released in September 2024.

== Reception ==
Reception

Aggregate scores
Aggregator	Score
Metacritic	(PC) 80/100 (PS5) 81/100 (XBSX) 83/100
OpenCritic	85%

Review scores
Publication	Score
Destructoid	8.5/10
Eurogamer	4/5
Famitsu	31/40
Game Informer	7.75/10
GameSpot	7/10
Hardcore Gamer	4/5
IGN	9/10
PC Gamer (US)	84/100
PCGamesN	8/10
Shacknews	9/10
VideoGamer.com	8/10

Remnant 2 received "generally favorable" reviews from critics, according to review aggregator website Metacritic. 85% of critics recommend the game on OpenCritic. In Japan, four critics from Famitsu gave the game a total score of 31 out of 40.

Rick Lane of PC Gamer praised the game's combat and implementation of procedural generation, but felt that the story was not cohesive enough to tie the rest of the game together.

=== Sales ===
Sales of Remnant 2 outpaced its predecessor, managing to nearly double the concurrent player count of Remnant: From the Ashes on Steam at launch. Remnant 2 was the second-best-selling video game on Steam at launch. The sales of the game exceeded Gearbox's expectations, selling over 1 million units during its first week after launch. In the United States, the game was the best-seller in July 2023. By the end of September 2023, it had sold over 2 million units.

=== Awards ===
Year	Ceremony	Category	Result	Ref.
2023	Golden Joystick Awards	Best Multiplayer Game	Nominated	
2023	The Game Awards 2023	Best Action Game	Nominated	
2024	The Steam Awards	Most Innovative Gameplay	Nominated	
2024	27th Annual D.I.C.E. Awards	Action Game of the Year	Nominated	
