= Warhammer 40,000: Dark Millennium =

Warhammer 40,000: Dark Millennium Online
- Developer: Vigil Games
- Publisher: THQ
- Series: Warhammer 40,000
- Platform: Microsoft Windows
- Release: Cancelled
- Genre: Massively multiplayer online role-playing
- Modes: Single-player, multiplayer

Warhammer 40,000: Dark Millennium Online was a video game to be based on Games Workshop's Warhammer 40,000 setting. It was under development by Vigil Games until THQ's closure.

== Gameplay ==
The game was to feature relatively in-depth fire-fights with player-formed squads as well as cover and flanking mechanics. However, being true to the setting, war and battles would have been a big feature of Warhammer 40,000 Online and the developer Vigil Games were promising to deliver battlegrounds of epic proportions. Controllable vehicles would have been a key aspect to the game; the developers have said that they would have been multifunctional and that some were able to sport multiple pilots.

The game would have been set in the 41st millennium, well after the Horus Heresy, and all races important to that period in the setting would have been represented, although only one playable race had been announced so far: the Imperium of Man. Details about characters were largely unknown, but it was said that there would be no non-combat classes in the game as this would not fit properly with the background. Players would be able to customize their characters visual appearance with ranged and melee weapons, armor, books, scrolls and chains.

Although war and battlefields would have been a large part of Dark Millennium the scope of the game would have included more of the setting than that; Vigil Games’ General Manager David Adams mentions being able to visit "cities (of all scales, types and sizes), exotic alien temples, Chaos shrines, deserted battlefields, mysterious ruins, ancient structures, drifting hulks in space, etc..." and that they would have been populated with all manners of non-player characters.

== Development ==
Originally announced in March 2007, further information was released as well as a teaser trailer at E3 2010. Originally planned to be a massively multiplayer online role-playing game, Vigil Games announced that they would be dropping the MMO components of the game in order to focus on a single-player game with a more traditional multiplayer experience.

On December 19, 2012, the publisher THQ, the owner of Vigil Games, filed for Chapter 11 bankruptcy, bringing Dark Millennium's fate into question. THQ's public relations representatives announced that the MMO aspect of the game was ended in March 2012, but not definitively answering if the project as a whole was cancelled. It was later stated in an interview that Dark Millennium had been retooled into a co-operative game with the working title Inquisitor, but that project too was eventually abandoned.
