= Enotria: The Last Song =

2024 video game

- Developer: Jyamma Games
- Publisher: Jyamma Games
- Artist: Federico Ferrarese
- Writer: Stoyan Stoyanov
- Composer: Aram Shahbazians
- Platforms: PlayStation 5 Windows; Xbox Series X/S
- Release: PlayStation 5, Windows; September 16, 2024; Xbox Series X/S; December 12, 2024
- Genre: Action role-playing game
- Mode: Single-player

Enotria: The Last Song is an action role-playing game developed and published by the Italian studio Jyamma Games. It was released for PlayStation 5 and Windows on September 16, 2024, and for Xbox Series X/S on December 12, 2024. It is a soulslike heavily inspired by FromSoftware's titles but with a setting based on Italian folklore and theater traditions. Upon release, Enotria: The Last Song received mixed reviews with praise directed towards its setting, art direction, and level design while being criticized for its lack of originality and numerous technical issues.

== Gameplay ==
Enotria: The Last Song is a third-person action RPG that follows the traditional soulslike formula with an emphasis on challenging combat, parrying, and timing-based attacks. The game is set in a sunlit world inspired by Italian Renaissance landscapes and commedia dell'arte, contrasting the darker aesthetics of most soulslike games. The player takes on the role of the Maskless One, a warrior who wields different masks that provide unique abilities and shape their playstyle. The Ardore system is the core gameplay mechanic, which lets players shift the world around them in real-time, changing enemy behaviors, environmental interactions, and combat scenarios.

== Plot ==
The game is set in the land of Enotria, where the world is trapped in an eternal theatrical play known as the Canovaccio, enforced by powerful beings called the Authors. The protagonist, the Maskless One, must defeat these entities to break the cycle and restore freedom.

== Development ==
Enotria: The Last Song is developed by Jyamma Games, an independent studio based in Milan, Italy. The game aims to bring a Mediterranean flair to the soulslike genre, drawing inspiration from Italian culture rather than the medieval and Gothic influences typically seen in similar titles. The game was announced in 2022 and underwent multiple beta tests before its final release in September 2024. The developers focused on refining combat mechanics, world design, and performance optimization. For the game's release in Asia, Jyamma Games announced that they were working with Sega for a 2024 release.

The game's story draws from Italian theatrical traditions and mythology, with characters and settings reminiscent of commedia dell'arte. Enotria is filled with references to folklore, masks, and staged performances.

== Release ==
Enotria: The Last Song launched on September 16, 2024, for PlayStation 5 and Windows. An Xbox version was planned but faced indefinite delays due to issues between Jyamma Games and Microsoft, causing frustration among fans. The game was eventually released on Xbox Series X/S on December 12, 2024.

== Reception ==
Reception

Aggregate scores
Aggregator	Score
Metacritic	PC: 69/100; PS5: 70/100
OpenCritic	31% recommend

Review scores
Publication	Score
IGN	7/10
PC Gamer (UK)	57/100
RPGamer	4/5
TechRadar	3.5/5

Enotria: The Last Song received "mixed or average" reviews according to review aggregator website Metacritic. The game was praised for its unique setting, artistic direction, and fresh take on the soulslike formula, but faced criticism for technical issues, performance problems, and a lack of polish. Critics noted that while the combat and world-building were engaging, frequent frame drops, optimization problems, and a steep difficulty curve hindered the experience. Some also pointed out that despite its Italian influences, the game lacked significant innovations compared to other soulslikes.
