= Crytek USA =

Former American video game developer

Crytek USA Corp.
- Type: Subsidiary
- Industry: Video games
- Founded: January 28, 2013
- Defunct: July 30, 2014
- Fate: Shut down
- Successor: Gunfire Games
- Headquarters: Austin, Texas, U.S.
- Key people: David Adams (CEO)
- Parent: Crytek

Crytek USA Corp. was an American video game developer based in Austin, Texas, and a subsidiary of Crytek. The studio was led by David Adams, who was formerly the CEO of Vigil Games; a studio that had been acquired by THQ, but was shut down as part of THQ's Chapter 11 bankruptcy on January 23, 2013. Adams was personally courted by Crytek's founder Cevat Yerli due to Vigil's work on the Darksiders series, and the trust and leadership of his studio's former staff—many of whom had also joined him at the studio.

On July 30, 2014, following financial difficulties that prevented employees from being paid on time, and the resulting departure of the studio's leadership and most of its employees, Crytek announced that the studio's sole game in development, Hunt: Horrors of the Gilded Age, would be taken over by Crytek, and that Crytek USA would survive solely as a provider of support for third-party CryEngine licensees. In August 2014, Adams formed Gunfire Games after his departure from Crytek USA.

== History ==
=== Formation ===
Although the company was putting a higher priority on acquiring the Homefront franchise during the auction of properties from the bankrupt video game publisher THQ (as its sequel was being developed by Crytek UK), Crytek's founder Cevat Yerli had expressed an interest in bidding for the Austin-based Vigil Games due to its work on the Darksiders series, and because Crytek was already planning to establish a U.S. subsidiary in Austin, However, he did not bid because he felt that the company's current projects did not fit with Crytek's current strategy. After a phone conversation with Adams following Vigil's failure to receive any bids at auction, Yerli considered Adams to be "passionate" and "caring" towards his studio's projects and staff. After learning that Vigil had been closed by THQ, Yerli quickly scheduled a flight to Austin to visit Adams and the rest of Vigil's former staff to see if they would be interested in joining Crytek USA.

Yerli trusted the creative skills of Vigil's employees based on their games alone, and quickly developed a relationship with Adams and his former colleagues; Yerli hired many of Vigil's former employees based solely on their leadership and trust around Adams. Crytek USA planned to start from "scratch" and not work on any previous IP (such as Darksiders and another project codenamed "Crawler"); however, Adams personally confirmed that Crytek would bid on the Darksiders franchise during THQ's second auction in April 2013. Adams expressed interest in the opportunity to bring the franchise "home" to its original creators. The series was instead sold to Nordic Games.

=== Shutdown ===
In June 2014, Crytek USA announced their first game, Hunt: Horrors of the Gilded Age. However, on July 30, 2014, Crytek announced that as part of a restructuring, development of Hunt would be shifted to Crytek, Crytek USA's remaining employees would be laid off and that limited operations would be maintained at Crytek USA to solely provide U.S.-based support for CryEngine licensees. Kotaku reported that much of the studio's staff, including David Adams, had already left the company due to difficulties receiving wage payments on time. Similar issues had been experienced by Crytek UK, which was shut down the same day with the sale of the Homefront franchise to Koch Media. Adams would go on to form a new studio known as Gunfire Games, which, again, consists primarily of former Vigil staff.
