= Darksiders =

Video game series

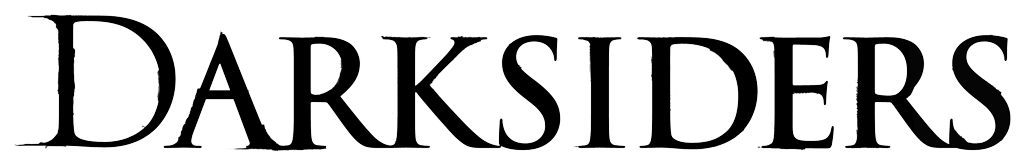
- Genres: Hack and slash, action-adventure
- Developers: Vigil Games (2010–2012); Gunfire Games (2015–present); Airship Syndicate (2019)
- Publishers: THQ (2010–2012); THQ Nordic (2015–present)
- Creators: Joe Madureira; David Adams
- Platforms: Linux; Microsoft Windows; Nintendo Switch; PlayStation 3; PlayStation 4; Wii U; Xbox 360; Xbox One; Stadia; OnLive
- First release: Darksiders; January 5, 2010
- Latest release: Darksiders Genesis; December 5, 2019

Darksiders is a hack and slash action-adventure video game franchise created by Vigil Games, now developed by Gunfire Games, which consists of some of the original members of Vigil. The series is set on a post-apocalyptic Earth, where humankind faces near-extinction and angels fight a losing battle against the demon hordes for control over the world. Among them are the Four Horsemen of the Apocalypse, the last of the Nephilim who are tasked to bring balance to the universe.

== Games ==
Release timeline
2010	Darksiders
2011
2012	Darksiders II
2013
2014
2015	Darksiders II: Deathinitive Edition
2016	Darksiders: Warmastered Edition
2017
2018	Darksiders III
2019	Darksiders Genesis
2020
2021
2022
2023
2024
2025
TBA	Darksiders 4

=== Darksiders (2010) ===
The first installment in the franchise, Darksiders was released in 2010 for PlayStation 3, Xbox 360, and Microsoft Windows. Originally set in a modern-day Earth, a war breaks out between Heaven and Hell. War, one of the Four Horsemen of the Apocalypse, finds himself on Earth in the midst of the battle. After War is killed in the battle, the Charred Council blame him for destroying the balance and starting the apocalypse. War vows to find the one truly responsible, so he is sent back to Earth, where 100 years have passed, in his search to find them.

An enhanced version, titled Darksiders: Warmastered Edition, published by Nordic Games, was released on November 22, 2016, for PlayStation 4 and Xbox One, on November 29 for Microsoft Windows, and on May 23, 2017, for Wii U. It was released on Nintendo Switch on April 2, 2019.

=== Darksiders II (2012) ===
The second installment in the franchise set parallel with the first game, Darksiders II was released in 2012 for Microsoft Windows, PlayStation 3, Wii U, and Xbox 360, this time with the protagonist as Death, the second of the Four Horsemen of the Apocalypse. Believing his brother War is innocent in his crimes, Death sets out to erase the crime War was blamed for as well as to try to resurrect humankind.

An enhanced version, titled Darksiders II: The Deathinitive Edition, was released on October 27, 2015, for PlayStation 4 and Xbox One, and on November 5 for Microsoft Windows. A Nintendo Switch version was released on September 26, 2019. It was published by Nordic Games, who had acquired the rights to the Darksiders franchise following the bankruptcy of THQ.

=== Darksiders III (2018) ===
The third installment in the franchise and parallel sequel to its predecessors, Darksiders III was released on November 27, 2018, for Microsoft Windows, PlayStation 4, and Xbox One. It was later released on September 30, 2021, for the Nintendo Switch. The player takes on the role of Fury, the third of the Four Horsemen of the Apocalypse. Again set parallel with the first two games, Fury is sent on a quest to recapture all of the escaped Seven Deadly Sins, but soon discovers that her mission is a snipe hunt engineered to remove her alongside all of humankind from interfering with a much wider web of intrigue perpetrated on all sides.

=== Darksiders Genesis (2019) ===
A spin-off prequel of the main series, Darksiders Genesis is a top-down action game which follows the fourth and final horseman, Strife, who, alongside his brother War, is called upon to save humankind from certain destruction at the hands of Lucifer. The game was released on Microsoft Windows and Stadia on December 5, 2019. It was subsequently released on PlayStation 4, Xbox One, and Nintendo Switch on February 14, 2020. Unlike the main series games, Genesis is developed by Airship Syndicate, who previously developed Battle Chasers: Nightwar, and comprises some of the original developers of Vigil Games.

=== Darksiders 4 (TBA) ===
At THQ Nordic Showcase 2024, Gunfire Games and THQ Nordic revealed that a new Darksiders game was in development.

== Gameplay ==
The Darksiders games feature an action role-playing hack and slash style of gameplay. Players take control of one of the Four Horsemen of the Apocalypse, from a third-person perspective, each of which characters offer unique play styles and equipment. In the first game, War's method of fighting is using a two-handed signature sword named Chaoseater, though throughout the game the player can equip various other items including a Scythe and a revolver. In Darksiders II, Death uses two scythes as his signature weapon, and in Darksiders III, Fury uses a whip and magic to tear down her enemies.

All Darksiders games generally have similar gameplay, as featuring an open world for the players to explore and a variety of puzzles to solve. Players can find chests that contain souls of the dead, which they can use to purchase a variety of items. The game has an emphasis on boss fights, where players need to learn their weak point in order to do vast amounts of damage. Players can also explore the open world by using the protagonists' own horses, War's being named Ruin, Death's being named Despair and Fury's being named Rampage.

Sometimes the series own gameplay format is compared to Bayonetta.

== Related media ==
Darksiders creator Joe Madureira expressed interest in a possible comic book series and film adaptation for the series. Madureira had been reportedly working on a screenplay, which he intended to sell its rights to a Hollywood studio. A prequel novel set before the events of Darksiders and Darksiders II titled Darksiders: The Abomination Vault was released in 2012. It was followed by a digital-first prequel comic series, titled Darksiders II: Death's Door, later the same year.

Hunt: Showdown was originally intended to be a spiritual successor to Darksiders.
