= Gunfire Games =

American video game developer

Gunfire Games, LLC
- Type: Subsidiary
- Industry: Video games
- Predecessor: Crytek USA
- Founded: July 2014; 12 years ago
- Founder: David Adams
- Headquarters: Austin, Texas, US
- Key people: David Adams (CEO); Matthew Guzenda (studio director)
- Number of employees: 82 (2021)
- Parent: THQ Nordic (2019–present)
- Divisions: Gunfire Games Europe
- Website: gunfiregames.com

Gunfire Games, LLC is an American video game developer based in Austin, Texas. The studio was founded by David Adams in July 2014, bringing with him the core team of Crytek USA just before that studio's closure. The company was acquired by THQ Nordic in August 2019.

== History ==
Gunfire Games founder David Adams had previously founded the developer Vigil Games alongside other former NCSoft employees in 2005. Vigil Games developed the Darksiders series and was acquired by THQ in 2006. The studio remained mostly unchanged until 2013, when THQ folded after filing for bankruptcy in 2012. On the last day of Vigil Games' operations, Adams received a call from Crytek asking him to help establish an American branch for the company; subsequently, Adams found himself as chief executive officer of the newly established Crytek USA two days later, bringing two-thirds of Vigil Games' former staff (around 50 people) with him. The idea for Crytek USA came about last-minute as no one had bid to acquire Vigil Games in THQ's bankruptcy auctions. Crytek later faced financial challenges as a result of which Crytek USA was chronically under-funded. At the same time, Adams wished to take matters in his own hands without having to rely on a larger governing entity. Thus, in July 2014, Adams decided to start an independent studio, Gunfire Games, and quit his job of eighteen months on the same day.

Gunfire Games began with seven people, all of them former leads from Crytek USA. Matthew Guzenda became the studio director. The studio quickly grew to 22 people by February 2015, and to 60 people by November 2017. For initial financing, the company turned to developing virtual reality games, partially in work-for-hire projects, for the Oculus Rift and Samsung Gear VR headsets. The studio developed five such games: Herobound: Spirit Champion, Herobound Gladiators, Chronos, Dead and Buried, From Other Suns. Following exchanges with Nordic Games (later known as THQ Nordic), Gunfire Games got to develop Darksiders II: Deathinitive Edition, a remaster of Darksiders II, which had been created by Vigil Games. The studio was also hired to develop a new entry in the Darksiders franchise, Darksiders III, which was released in 2018. In August 2019, THQ Nordic acquired Gunfire Games for an undisclosed price. At the time, Gunfire Games had 63 employees. On August 20, 2019, Remnant: From the Ashes was released through publisher Perfect World Entertainment. In October 2025, the sister company Appeal Studios was assigned to Gunfire Games as Gunfire Games Europe.

== Games developed ==
Year	Title	Platform(s)	Publisher(s)
2015	Herobound: Spirit Champion	Windows, Oculus Go, Samsung Gear VR	Oculus Studios, Gunfire Games
2015	Darksiders II: Deathinitive Edition	Windows, Nintendo Switch, PlayStation 4, Xbox One, Google Stadia, PlayStation 5, Xbox Series X/S	THQ Nordic
2016	Herobound Gladiators	Windows, Oculus Go, Samsung Gear VR	Oculus Studios
2016	Chronos	Windows	Gunfire Games
2016	Dead and Buried	Windows, Oculus Go, Samsung Gear VR	Oculus Studios
2017	From Other Suns	Windows	Gunfire Games
2018	Darksiders III	Windows, PlayStation 4, Xbox One, Nintendo Switch	THQ Nordic
2019	Remnant: From the Ashes	Windows, PlayStation 4, Xbox One, Nintendo Switch	Perfect World Entertainment
2020	Chronos: Before the Ashes	Windows, Nintendo Switch, PlayStation 4, Xbox One, Google Stadia	THQ Nordic
2023	Remnant II	Windows, PlayStation 5, Xbox Series X/S	Gearbox Publishing San Francisco
TBA	Darksiders 4	Windows, PlayStation 5, Xbox Series X/S	THQ Nordic
