= David Adams (video game designer) =

American video game designer

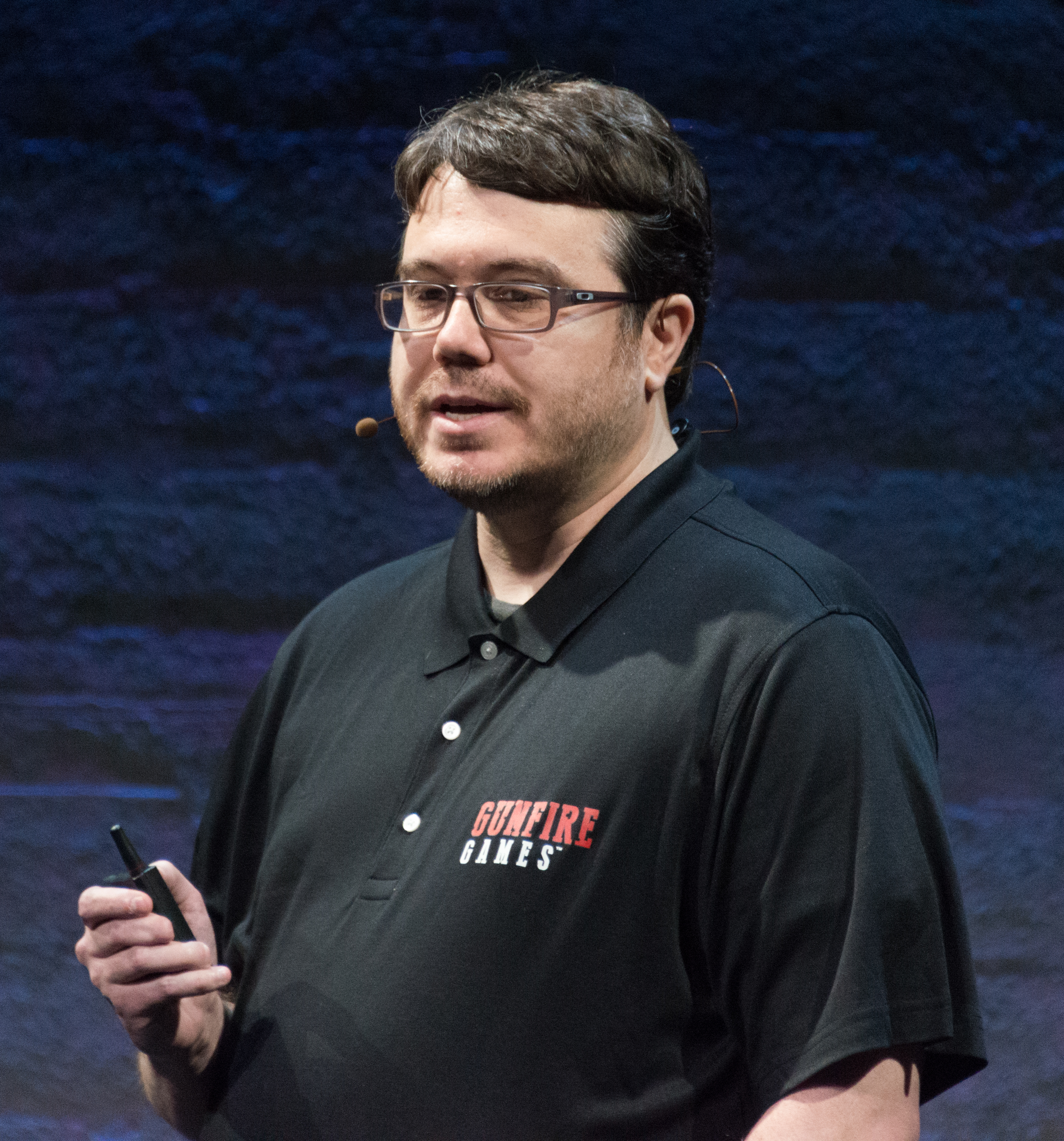
- Adams in 2015
- Occupations: Video game designer, founder of Gunfire Games

David Adams is an American video game designer best known for his work on Darksiders and Warhammer 40,000: Dark Millennium. In 2014, Adams founded Gunfire Games.

Adams co-founded Realm Interactive to create Trade Wars: Dark Millennium, a sequel of the classic BBS game Trade Wars 2002. Realm Interactive generated interest in the industry around the nostalgia of the old game. NCSoft initially decided to publish Trade Wars, but later decided that since the game had changed significantly it should be renamed as Exarch.

In 2005, Adams founded Vigil Games with Joe Madureira. In 2006, Vigil Games was acquired by THQ. As a part of THQ's Chapter 11 bankruptcy, Vigil Games was closed in January 2013. Just days later, Adams became the CEO of a new Austin-based branch of Crytek, known as Crytek USA. The studio hired many of Vigil Games' former employees, based purely off their work under his leadership. Adams later left Crytek. In July 2014, Adams started an independent video game studio Gunfire Games along with other former Crytek USA staff, and is the CEO.
