= Joe Madureira =

Comic book artist and video game developer

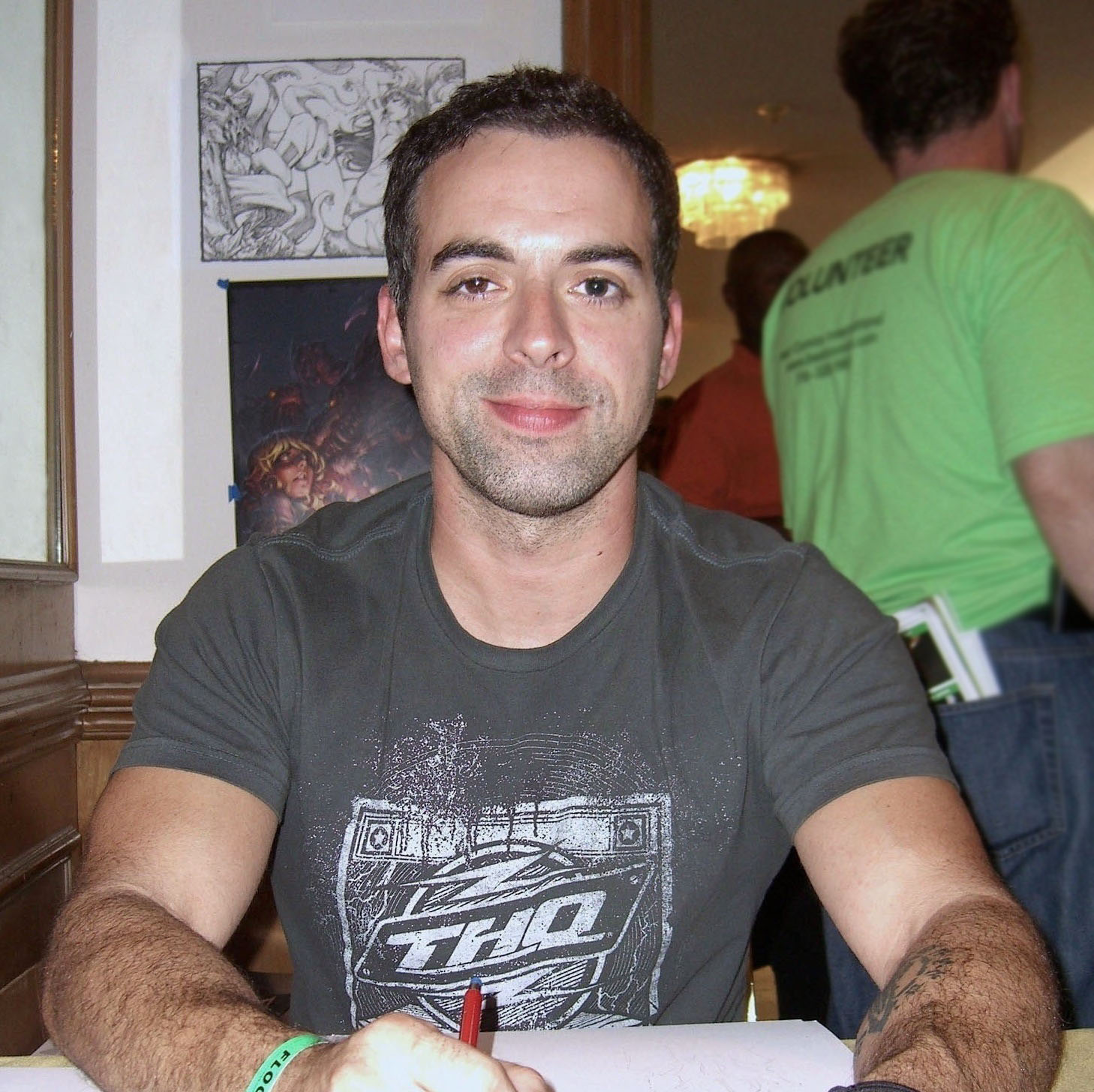
- Madureira at the Big Apple Convention in Manhattan, October 2, 2010
- Born: December 1974 (age 51)
- Areas: Penciller, Inker
- Pseudonym: Joe Mad
- Notable works: Darksiders; Battle Chasers; Uncanny X-Men

Joe Madureira (/ˈmædəˌrɛrə/; born December 1974), often called Joe Mad, is an American comic book artist and game developer, best known for his work on Darksiders, Marvel Comics' Uncanny X-Men and his creator-owned comic book Battle Chasers. He is the founder of video game development companies Vigil Games and Airship Syndicate.

Madureira's style combines Western comic book influences (most notably the influence of artist Arthur Adams) though it evolved to incorporate heavy influences from Japanese manga and video games.

== Early life ==
Joe Madureira was born December 1974, and is of Portuguese descent. He attended the High School of Art and Design in Manhattan.

== Career ==
At age 16, while still in high school, Madureira started at Marvel Comics as an intern, working under editor Danny Fingeroth. Madureira's art, which was heavily influenced by Arthur Adams, was first published in an eight-page story for the anthology series Marvel Comics Presents #89 (November 1991), starring Mojo, and then a story starring Northstar in issue #92 (December 1992). Despite the order of publication, Madureira drew the Mojo story second, as the influence of Arthur Adams, who co-created Mojo, is more evident in that story, and is closer to the style for which Madureira was known in the initial part of his career. His style would later evolve as he incorporated the influence of Japanese manga.

In 1993 Madureira penciled the first Deadpool mini-series, The Circle Chase. That same year he drew Vanguard #3 for Erik Larsen's studio, which was published by Image Comics.

Madureira became the regular penciler on Uncanny X-Men in 1994. During the "Age of Apocalypse" storyline, all X-Men titles were renamed; Madureira illustrated Uncanny X-Men's replacement as the four-issue miniseries Astonishing X-Men, Vol. 1.

He left Uncanny X-Men in 1997 to work on his own sword and sorcery series Battle Chasers for Wildstorm Comics' creator-owned Cliffhanger imprint (before it was sold to DC Comics). Shortly before leaving Uncanny X-Men, he commented that he felt the series had become too "dark and depressing" for his taste.

Madureira produced a total of nine issues in four years (publishing two to three a year), a pace for which he was criticized. He canceled Battle Chasers #10, and placed the series on indefinite hiatus after forming a game development company called Tri-Lunar with Tim Donley and Greg Peterson.

With Tri-Lunar, he created concept art on a game called Dragonkind which was canceled when Tri-Lunar went out of business. He then went to work for Realm Interactive, another start-up company, on Trade Wars: Dark Millennium. When Realm Interactive was acquired by NCsoft, he continued to contribute to the game as it evolved into Exarch, and was eventually released as Dungeon Runners. As Creative Director at THQ, he helped develop the game Darksiders, including designing the game's characters and settings; collaborator Joe Kelly wrote the game's script.

Madureira returned to the comic book industry as the artist on Marvel's The Ultimates 3, with writer Jeph Loeb. The second issue was published in January 2008, the third issue released on February 20, 2008. Ultimates 3 #4 came out on June 25, 2008. The run received negative reviews and sold less than previous Ultimates volumes.

In July 2007, Vigil Games' Darksiders was announced, of which Joe Madureira was creative director. It follows War, one of the Four Horsemen of the Apocalypse, on his quest to find out who prematurely triggered the apocalypse. It was released on Xbox 360 and PlayStation 3 on January 5, 2010.

Madureira has also provided cover artwork for Capcom's Marvel Super Heroes for the Sega Saturn and Sony PlayStation, and the Sony PlayStation game Gekido: Urban Fighters and Darkened Skye.

On June 13, 2011, it was announced that he would be handling art duties on a new series written by Zeb Wells entitled Avenging Spider-Man. Following a three issue run on the title, Marvel announced on March 11, 2013, that Madureira would be re-teaming with Wells for a story arc on Savage Wolverine beginning with #6 in June 2013.

Early in 2015 Joe Madureira and Ryan Stefanelli, co-founders of Vigil Games, formed a new studio, Airship Syndicate, located in Austin Texas, and announced that their first project a game adapted from Battle Chasers. Battle Chasers: Nightwar was released in October 2017 for Microsoft Windows, macOS, PlayStation 4 and Xbox One, and in May 2018 for Nintendo Switch and Linux.

In February 2023, Madureira confirmed to io9 that after having left Battlechasers on a cliffhanger 20 years earlier, he would produce the conclusion to the story with Battle Chasers #10, which had originally been solicited for November 2001, and would release it June 14 through Image. Madureira would write the issue and produce the cover art, while Ludo Lullabi would provide the interior art.

== Personal life ==
As of 2021, Madureira lives in Austin, Texas.

Madureira has a daughter, who was six years old as of June 2011.

== Selected bibliography ==
- Excalibur #57–58 (Marvel Comics, 1992)
- Deadpool: The Circle Chase #1–4 (Marvel Comics, 1993)
- Uncanny X-Men #312–313, 316–317, 325–326, 328–330, 332, 334–338, 340–343, 345–348, 350 (Marvel Comics, 1994–1997)
- Astonishing X-Men #1–4 (Marvel Comics, 1995)
- Battle Chasers #0, #1–12 (Cliffhanger, Image Comics, 1998–2023). NOTE: #10-12 Script only
- Ultimates 3 #1–5 (Marvel Comics, 2008)
- Avenging Spider-Man #1–3 (Marvel Comics, 2011–2012)
- Savage Wolverine #6–8 (Marvel Comics, 2013)
- Inhuman #1–3 (Marvel Comics, 2014)

== Notes ==
Preceded by John Romita, Jr.	Uncanny X-Men artist 1994–1997	Succeeded by Chris Bachalo
