= Vigil Games =

American game development company

- Type: Subsidiary
- Industry: Video games
- Founded: 2005; 21 years ago
- Founder: Joe Madureira; David Adams
- Defunct: January 23, 2013; 13 years ago
- Fate: Closed by parent, most staffs moved to Crytek USA, headed by David Adams, and Airship Syndicate, headed by Joe Madureira
- Successor: Airship Syndicate; Crytek USA
- Headquarters: Austin, Texas, U.S.
- Key people: David Adams (general manager)
- Products: Darksiders series
- Owner: THQ (2006–2013)
- Website: Official website

Vigil Games was an American game development company owned by THQ. It was formed by comic artist Joe Madureira and David Adams in 2005.

== History ==
Vigil Games was founded in 2005 by Joe Madureira, David Adams, Marvin Donald and Ryan Stefanelli. Vigil Games became a part of the THQ family in 2006, and was located in Austin, Texas. Vigil Games was housed in Four Points Centre where THQ leased 33,000 square feet.

Although much of THQ's assets were sold in an auction as part of bankruptcy hearings, Vigil itself received no bids. In a letter written by THQ's CEO Brian Farrell, it was stated that Vigil would remain part of the Chapter 11 case and that THQ would still try to find a suitable buyer for the properties not sold in the auction, but that there would be immediate job losses in the affected entities.

At the time of bankruptcy, Vigil was developing Warhammer 40,000: Dark Millennium Online.

In a posting on Twitter, PlatinumGames producer Atsushi Inaba expressed interest in acquiring the Darksiders franchise from THQ. In the end, Nordic Games acquired the Darksiders franchise, along with the Red Faction and MX vs. ATV franchises.

While Crytek planned to bid for Vigil due to its past work, owner Cevat Yerli ultimately decided not to because he felt that its current projects would not fit with the company's strategy. However, following Vigil's closure, Crytek would establish a new U.S. subsidiary known Crytek USA, led by David Adams and employing many of its former staff.

Other former Vigil employees have gone to work for Retro Studios, BattleCry Studios, Certain Affinity and many others. Many of the staff also joined Gunfire Games, a company set up in 2014 by Adams and Airship Syndicate, formed by co-founder Joe Madureira in 2015.

== Games developed ==
| Year | Title | Platform(s) | | | | |
| Year | Title | PS3 | Wii U | Win | X360 | OnLive |
|---|---|---|---|---|---|---|
| 2010 | Darksiders | Yes | Yes | Yes | Yes | Yes |
| 2012 | Darksiders II | Yes | Yes | Yes | Yes | Yes |
