= THQ Nordic =

Austrian video game publisher

THQ Nordic GmbH
- Logo used since 2016
- Formerly: Nordic Games GmbH (2011–2016)
- Type: Subsidiary
- Industry: Video games
- Founded: 2011; 15 years ago
- Headquarters: Vienna, Austria
- Area served: Worldwide
- Key people: Klemens Kreuzer (CEO); Reinhard Pollice (director of business and product development)
- Products: See List of THQ Nordic games
- Revenue: ▲€161 million (2022)
- Number of employees: 988 (2022)
- Parent: Embracer Group
- Subsidiaries: See § Subsidiaries
- Website: thqnordic.com

THQ Nordic GmbH (formerly Nordic Games GmbH) is an Austrian video game publisher based in Vienna and subsidiary of Embracer Group. Founded in 2011 as part of Nordic Games Holding (now known as Embracer), the company, as was the parent company, were renamed THQ Nordic in August 2016 after the parent company had acquired the "THQ" trademark in 2014.

It publishes licensed games from entertainment companies such as AEW, Nickelodeon, Lucasfilm Ltd., Comedy Central, and Disney, and its own franchises like Destroy All Humans!, Darksiders, Alone in the Dark, SpellForce, and Gothic. THQ Nordic's core portfolio comprises assets that were acquired from other developers and publishers, such as from JoWooD Entertainment and its subsidiaries DreamCatcher Interactive and The Adventure Company in 2011, THQ in 2013, and NovaLogic in 2016. THQ Nordic has acquired and established several subsidiary studios, including Black Forest Games, Bugbear Entertainment, Gunfire Games, HandyGames, Piranha Bytes, Purple Lamp, and Rainbow Studios.

== History ==
=== As Nordic Games GmbH (2011–2016) ===
Former Nordic Games logo (2011–2016)

Nordic Games GmbH was founded in 2011 as part of the Nordic Games Holding group. Within this group, Nordic Games became a subsidiary of Nordic Games Licensing, which was established in the same year. In June 2011, Nordic Games Holding acquired assets from JoWooD, a bankrupt Austrian video game publisher, and its affiliate companies DreamCatcher Interactive and The Adventure Company, including their brands and products. Several former JoWooD employees were hired by Nordic Games to work on sales of JoWooD's former properties, and Nordic Games Group's former publishing arm, Nordic Games Publishing, was integrated into the new Nordic Games to facilitate operations.

Darksiders is a top product. THQ spent $50m making Darksiders 2 (...) We can produce a product of the same quality but for a lower cost. $50m is ridiculous, I can't afford that. Many of our IPs will only generate $50k a year, but it's still money. Sure, it's amounts that EA and the big guys wouldn't care about, but now we have hundreds of IPs, and in a few years we'll have a few hundred more. It will add up to something much bigger.

— Lars Wingefors

In April 2013, Nordic Games acquired all left-over properties from the bankruptcy auctions of American video game publisher THQ for US$4.9 million. Included in the deal were over 150 individual games, including the Darksiders, Red Faction, and MX vs. ATV franchises. In June 2013, Nordic Games acquired the Desperados franchise, comprising Desperados: Wanted Dead or Alive and Desperados 2: Cooper's Revenge, as well as the game Silver, from Atari.

In December 2013, Nordic Games launched Grimlore Games, a video game developer composed of former Coreplay employees, based in Munich, Germany. In May 2014, Nordic Games acquired the intellectual property for The Moment of Silence, The Mystery of the Druids and Curse of the Ghost Ship, as well as the publishing rights to Overclocked: A History of Violence and 15 Days, from bankrupt German publisher DTP Entertainment.

In July 2015, Nordic Games and developer Piranha Bytes announced ELEX, an original action role-playing game. The following month, Nordic Games acquired a number of franchises from bankrupt German publisher bitComposer Entertainment, including the Jagged Alliance franchise. In February 2016, Nordic Games acquired all intellectual property from Hungarian publisher Digital Reality, including Sine Mora.

=== As THQ Nordic GmbH (2016–present) ===
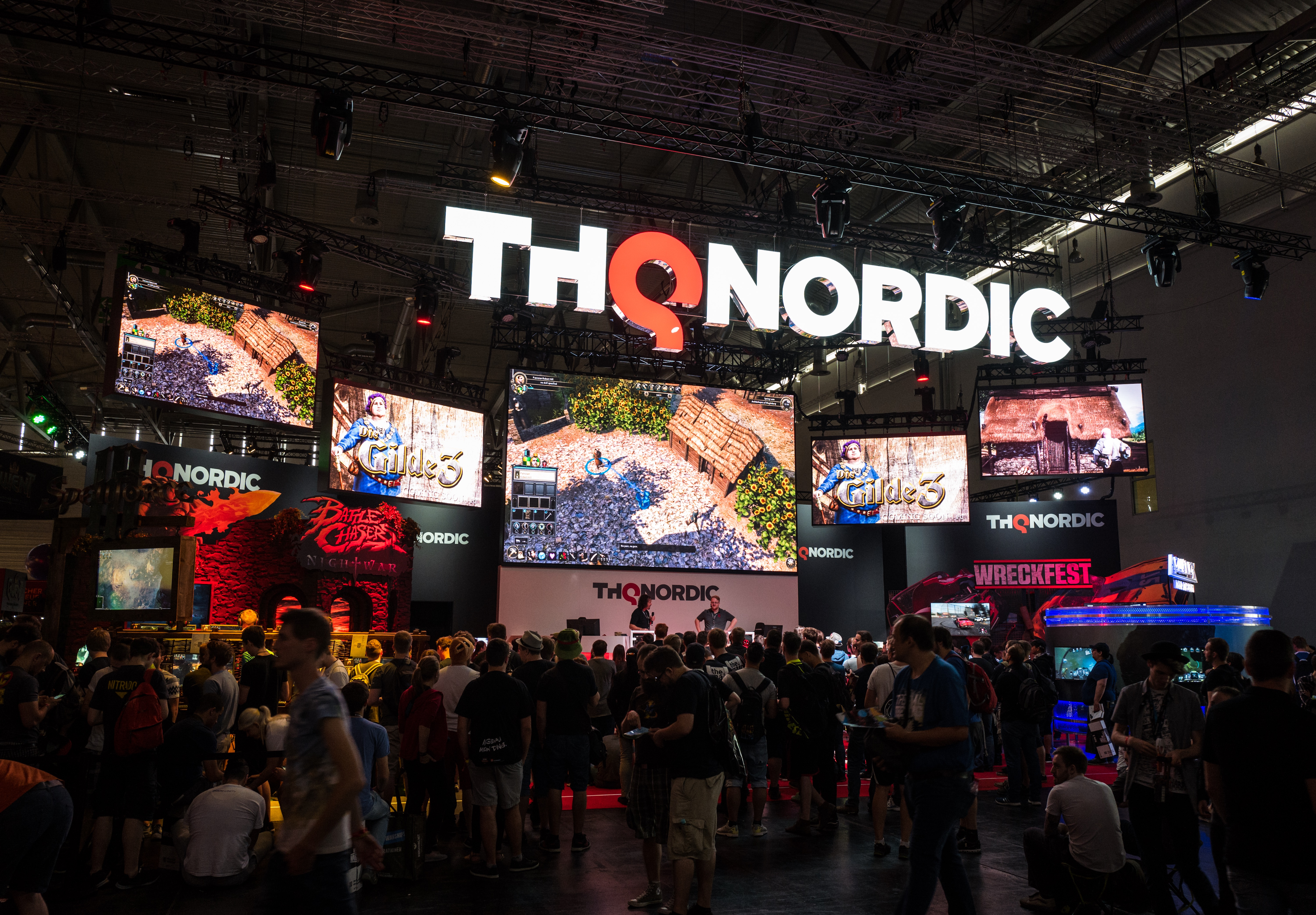
THQ Nordic booth at Gamescom 2017

In August 2016, Nordic Games changed its name to THQ Nordic GmbH (alongside Nordic Games Licensing AB, which became THQ Nordic AB), utilising the "THQ" trademark the parent company had acquired in June 2014. According to Wingefors and THQ Nordic's Reinhard Pollice, the name change was undergone to capitalise on the good reputation of THQ's past, although they avoided naming the companies just "THQ" to avoid connections to THQ's more recent, troubled history being made. In October 2016, THQ Nordic announced that it had acquired all intellectual property and assets from NovaLogic, including Delta Force. In December 2016, THQ Nordic announced that it had acquired Sphinx and the Cursed Mummy from Mobile Gaming Studios, as well as Legends of War and War Leaders: Clash of Nations from Enigma Software Productions. Sometime in late 2016, THQ Nordic launched Mirage Game Studios in Karlstad, Sweden.

In February 2017, THQ Nordic announced that it, alongside Digital Continue, was developing a remaster of Lock's Quest with a tentative release in April 2017 for Microsoft Windows, PlayStation 4 and Xbox One. In March 2017, THQ Nordic announced a remastered version of Baja: Edge of Control, titled Baja: Edge of Control HD, a port of De Blob for Microsoft Windows, developed by BlitWorks, and Sine Mora EX, an extended version of Sine Mora, for Microsoft Windows, PlayStation 4 and Xbox One. Later that month, THQ Nordic also acquired the in-development Rad Rodgers, overtaking publishing on behalf of developer Slipgate Studios. In May 2017, THQ Nordic announced a new game, Darksiders III, developed by Gunfire Games, which was composed of former employees from original Darksiders developer Vigil Games. In August 2017, THQ Nordic acquired German developer Black Forest Games for €1.35 million and Swedish developer Pieces Interactive for 2.8 million kr. This was followed by the acquisition of Experiment 101, the Swedish developer behind the in-development Biomutant, for 75.3 million kr in November 2017.

In March 2018, after Activision's licence for games on Nickelodeon properties had expired, THQ Nordic announced a partnership with Nickelodeon that would allow it to re-release sixteen Nickelodeon games previously published by THQ. In July 2018, THQ Nordic acquired German mobile game developer-publisher HandyGames for €1 million in cash and a performance-based earn-out of up to €1.5 million. In August 2018, THQ Nordic announced that it had acquired the rights to Second Sight and the TimeSplitters franchise from Crytek. In September, THQ Nordic acquired the intellectual property to Kingdoms of Amalur: Reckoning, including the cancelled Project Copernicus, from 38 Studios, as well as Act of War and the Alone in the Dark franchise from Atari.

In November 2018, THQ Nordic acquired a 90% stake in Finnish developer Bugbear Entertainment, including all of its intellectual property, for an undisclosed sum, leaving open the option to purchase the remaining 10% at a later point in time. That same month, THQ Nordic acquired the Expeditions franchise, including Expeditions: Conquistador and Expeditions: Viking, and announced that it was working with series creator Logic Artists to develop a third game in the series. In December 2018, THQ Nordic acquired the Carmageddon franchise from Stainless Games, which itself had bought the franchise in 2011.

In January 2019, THQ Nordic acquired the rights to the Outcast franchise from Belgian developer Appeal. In May 2019, the publisher acquired Piranha Bytes. In August 2019, THQ Nordic acquired American developer Gunfire Games, which had worked with THQ Nordic on the release of Darksiders III. Nine Rocks Games, an in-house studio based in Bratislava, Slovakia, and led by David Durcak of DayZ, was established by THQ Nordic in February 2020 to work on "shooter/survival" games.

On 26 February 2019, THQ Nordic's public relations and marketing director, Philipp Brock, and business and product development director Reinhard Pollice, hosted an "Ask Me Anything" (AMA) questions-and-answers session on 8chan, a controversial imageboard website commonly associated with child pornography, racism and hate speech, including the Gamergate controversy. The AMA was announced by Brock through THQ Nordic's Twitter account, and after receiving initial criticism for using the controversial website as host for the AMA, explained that a person named Mark would "take care of the nasty stuff". On 8chan, both Brock and Pollice interacted with users asking about controversial topics, such as "lolis" and "social justice warriors", garnering further criticism. After widespread criticism, Brock apologised on THQ Nordic's Twitter account, writing that he did not research the site's history and that he did not "condone child pornography, white supremacy, or racism". Lars Wingefors, the co-founder and chief executive officer of THQ Nordic AB, apologised for the event in early March.

In May 2020, THQ Nordic and Koch Media, another Embracer Group arm, exchanged several intellectual property rights: THQ Nordic received Risen, Rush for Berlin, Sacred, Second Sight, and Singles: Flirt Up Your Life, while handing off Red Faction and Painkiller to Koch Media's Deep Silver label.

After previously seeking player opinion on a possible Gothic remake as early as 2019, THQ Nordic announced in March 2021 that it had established Alkimia Interactive in Barcelona to lead development on this project.

THQ announced the acquisition of Kaiko, Appeal Studios, and Massive Miniteam (Pulheim-based porting studio) in May 2021, along with the creation of distributor THQ Nordic France and animation technical division Gate21.

On February 24, 2022, THQNordic announced the acquisition of Frankfurt-based Metricminds, a motion capture and animation studio that has worked on THQNordic games like Destroy All Humans! (2020), Darksiders III and Remnant: From The Ashes.

In June 2023, it was announced that Campfire Cabal was closed with all its employees being laid off. However, in May 2025, after being radio silent for almost 2 years, the studio announced that they have "never shut down" despite losing a lot of employees, and that it was them who released a patch for Expeditions: Rome in November 2024. They also revealed that they have been working on a new entry in the Expeditions series, which was announced in June 2026 under the title Expeditions: Samurai.

== Subsidiaries ==
THQ Nordic operates several development studios, as well as two international distribution arms: THQ Nordic Inc. in the United States (established in 2012) and THQ Nordic Japan KK in Japan (established in 2019).

| Name | Location | Founded | Acquired | Ref. |
|---|---|---|---|---|
| Alkimia Interactive | Barcelona | 2018 | — | |
| Appeal Studios | Belgium | 2018 | 2021 | |
| Ashborne Games | Brno | 2020 | — | |
| Black Forest Games | Offenburg | July 2012 | August 2017 | |
| Bugbear Entertainment | Helsinki | 2000 | November 2018 | |
| Campfire Cabal | Copenhagen | September 2022 | — | |
| Experiment 101 | Stockholm | 2015 | November 2017 | |
| Gate21 | Sarajevo | 2021 | — | |
| Grimlore Games | Munich | December 2013 | — | |
| Gunfire Games | Austin, Texas | 2014 | August 2019 | |
| THQ Nordic Mobile | Giebelstadt | 2000 | July 2018 | |
| Kaiko | Frankfurt | 2014 | 2021 | |
| Metricminds | Frankfurt | 2001 | February 2022 | |
| Nine Rocks Games | Bratislava | February 2020 | — | |
| Purple Lamp | Vienna | 2018 | November 2020 | |
| Tarsier Studios | Malmö | 2004 | December 2019 | |

=== Former ===
| Name | Location | Founded | Acquired | Divested | Fate | Ref. |
|---|---|---|---|---|---|---|
| Foxglove Studios | Stockholm | 2016 | — | 2019 | Spun off | |
| Mirage Game Studios AB | Karlstad | January 2017 | — | April 2025 | Defunct | |
| Pieces Interactive | Skövde | 2007 | August 2017 | June 17, 2024 | Defunct | |
| Piranha Bytes | Essen | 1997 | May 2019 | June 2024 | Defunct | |
| Pow Wow Entertainment | Vienna | 2019 | August 2020 | June 2024 | Defunct | |
| Rainbow Studios | Phoenix, Arizona | 2013 (Note: The original incarnation of Rainbow Studios was owned by THQ; it was renamed THQ Digital Studios Phoenix in February 2010 and closed down completely in August 2011. After THQ Nordic, then Nordic Games, had acquired the Rainbow Studios-developed MX vs. ATV franchise from THQ's bankruptcy auction, the company opted to resurrect Rainbow Studios that same year in its original location with at least eight former Rainbow Studios staff members.) | — | 2024 | Spun off | |
