= Outsource Media =

Outsource Media Ltd, operating as OMUK, is a London based production company providing voice casting and recording for video games. OMUK was founded in 1996, by dialogue producer Mark Estdale. OMUK has produced audio content for over 1,000 video games, including titles nominated for sixteen BAFTA Games Awards since 2006.

== Titles ==
Video game tiles that OMUK has produced voice content for include: Warhammer 40,000 Darktide, Horizon Zero Dawn, Clive Barker's Jericho, published by Codemasters; Game of Thrones - A Telltale Games Series, The Witcher, published by Atari; Haze, published by Ubisoft and developed by Free Radical Design; the Xbox 360 launch title Perfect Dark Zero, developed by Rare; Wallace & Gromit: The Curse of the Were-Rabbit, the action-adventure game; Rogue Trooper, developed by Rebellion Developments; Drakan: The Ancients' Gates, an action-adventure PlayStation 2 game by Surreal Software; Conflict: Desert Storm, developed by Pivotal Games and published by SCi; Wipeout Pure and Wipeout Pulse, developed by Sony Computer Entertainment for the PlayStation 2 and PSP; TimeSplitters 2, published by Eidos Interactive and developed by Free Radical Design, TimeSplitters: Future Perfect and Second Sight, also developed by Free Radical Design and published by EA Games and Codemasters respectively; the Xbox launch title Fuzion Frenzy, developed by Blitz Games and published by Microsoft Game Studios; Yager; Charles Cecil's Broken Sword: The Sleeping Dragon; X: Beyond the Frontier; X-Tension. Outsource Media also created the voice for Pac-Man in Pac-Man World 3, developed by Blitz Games and published by Namco. They also provided English translations and recordings for the games in The Book of Unwritten Tales series, for Broken Sword 5 and for Randal's Monday.
