= Mark Estdale =

- Origin: Harrogate, North Yorkshire, England
- Genre: Electronic
- Occupations: CEO of Outsource Media; Voice actor Vocal Director; Casting Director; Sound engineer
- Instruments: Drums, mixing
- Years active: 1984-1988 (music); 1994-present (video games)
- Label: Native Records
- Website: www.OMUK.com

Mark Estdale is a British voice director, sound engineer, voice actor, and casting director. In the 1980s, he worked as a sound engineer for musicians such as The Box, UV PØP, and industrial band In the Nursery. He co-founded the electronic band Chains with Peter Hope, which in 1986 released a single on Native Records. In the 1990s, Estdale began working on video games, and is well known in the industry for founding the voice production company Outsource Media in 1996. As casting and voice director he has worked on over five hundred video games since 1995, including titles such as TimeSplitters 2, Book of Spells, and Wallace & Gromit's Grand Adventures.

== Music career ==
Estdale first started a career in music in the late 1970s. In 1984 he engineered the album Muscle In by the new wave band The Box. He also engineered Murmur by Sheffield industrial band Hula. From 1985 to 1988 he worked as either co-producer or sound engineer for a multitude of albums, including another release by The Box, two more releases by Hula, two releases by UV PØP, an album by the Lo-Fi and experimental band Toxic Shock, an album by jazz pianist John Avery, and three releases by industrial band In the Nursery.

In 1986, Estdale co-founded the electronic band Chain with Peter Hope. The band released their debut single, "Banging on the House / Chains", in February 1986 on Native Records. Estdale co-wrote and programmed both tracks, also providing drums and co-producing with Hope.

== Video game career ==
In 1995, Estdale was hired as the voice recording engineer for the video game Touché: The Adventures of the Fifth Musketeer for US Gold. After which he began working almost exclusively within the video games. He worked as the recording engineer for GT Racers that same year, and in 1996 directed Happy Birthday Maisy and Gloriana.

=== Outsource Media ===
In 1996, Estdale founded Outsource Media, a specialist voice production and dialogue company in Sheffield. In 1998 Estdale began serving as a voice casting director, starting with OverBlood 2, for which he was also a voice actor. That same year he was both casting and vocal director for Incoming and Extreme-G 2.

Estdale stated that the company was originally created as a lifestyle business to make sure he had time with his children, and because he found video game dialogue a creative challenge. After 2002, however, he focused on the company more intently, and it underwent significant growth. The company currently provides video game dialogue services such as scriptwriting and adaption, casting, recording, and post production. The company's stated goal is bringing the dialogue quality of film and television to video games.

In 2004, Outsource Media was nominated for the Develop Industry Excellence Award for Services and Outsourcing, and their productions were nominated for 10 BAFTA Games Awards that year alone.

Estdale opened an office in Los Angeles in 2005, after Hollywood studios such as DreamWorks Animation began approaching the company. Outsource Media now has 3 recording studios in London. In 2010, Estdale, who still serves as the company's Director and CEO, joined the company with TIGA, the trade association that represents the UK games industry.

Through his company, Estdale has worked with game publishers and developers: Microsoft, Sony, Electronic Arts, Atari, Ubisoft, LucasArts, Activision, Konami, Namco, Telltale Games, Codemasters, Climax Entertainment, Revolution Software, Relentless, Blitz Games, Rebellion Developments, Frontier Developments, and Rare.

=== Beliefs on video games ===
Estdale is an active individual for professional acting and script writing in the video game industry. He is recognised for revolutionising recording for interactive media.

The biggest need is educating those in control of development to understand what is needed to get results. Throwing money at voice doesn't help if the basics are wrong. The non-linearity of [a video game] means the audience may spend hours, days, even weeks with your character. The slightest [dialogue] blemish will be under a microscope. The tiniest flaw can shatter the audience's suspension of disbelief.

He is also a proponent for video games hiring professional actors that have experience with character improvisation on stage, film, or radio, as he has stated that voice-over artists are often inexperienced with acting. Estdale has espoused that another common industry problem is hiring voice actors late into the production, as they aren't given time to fully express their craftsmanship.

Estdale has also been developing software tools, known as Creative Dialogue Tools (CDT) to improve the dialogue recording and editing process for video games.

What the actor needs is something at the point of performance that they can react to. To provide that for non-linear media, you need to throw away all previous script models. What CDT does is enable the recording studio to actually emulate the game engine in the recording studio immersing the actor in the game at the point of creation.

== Discography ==
- 1986: Banging on the House/Chains by Chain (Native Records)

Technical

- 1984: Muscle In by The Box - co-producer, engineer
- 1984: Murmur by Hula - engineer
- 1985: Live: Muscle Out by The Box - live mix
- 1985: "Anyone For Me" on Anyone For Me EP by UV PØP - mixer, co-producer
- 1985: Just Another Day by Toxic Shock - engineer
- 1985: Nighthawks by John Avery - engineer
- 1985: Walk on Stalks of Shattered Glass by Hula - engineer
- 1986: Serious by UV PØP - producer
- 1986: Twins by In the Nursery - engineer
- 1986: 1000 Hours by Hula - live sound technician
- 1988: Threshold by Hula - engineer
- 1988: ITN by In the Nursery - sound engineer
- 1997: Praha 1 (live) by In the Nursery - sound engineer

== Video game credits ==
- 1995: GT Racers - Voice Director
- 1995: Touché: The Adventures of the Fifth Musketeer - Sound Recording Engineer
- 1998: Need for Speed: Road Challenge - Voice & Casting Director
- 1998: Incoming - Voice Director
- 1998: Overblood 2 - Voice & Casting Director
- 1999: X: Beyond the Frontier - Voice Director
- 1999: 3-2-1 Smurf - Voice Director
- 1999: Panzer Elite - Voice Director
- 2000: Asterix: The Gallic War - Casting and Voice Director
- 2000: X-Tension - Casting and Voice Director
- 2001: Independence War 2: Edge of Chaos - Casting and Voice Director
- 2001: Fuzion Frenzy - Casting and Voice Director
- 2002: Diggles: The Myth of Fenris - Casting and Voice Director
- 2002: Drakan: The Ancients' Gates - Casting and Voice Director
- 2002: Stuart Little 2 - Casting and Voice Director
- 2002: Conflict: Desert Storm - Casting and Voice Director
- 2002: TimeSplitters 2 - Casting and Voice Director
- 2003: Outrun 2 - Casting Director
- 2003: The Great Escape - Casting Director
- 2003: Formula One 2003 - Casting Director
- 2003: Broken Sword: The Sleeping Dragon - Casting Director
- 2004: Destruction Derby Arenas - Casting and Voice Director
- 2004: Formula One 2004 - Casting and Voice Director
- 2004: Miami Vice - Casting and Voice Director
- 2004: Second Sight - Casting and Voice Director
- 2004: Powerdrome - Casting and Voice Director
- 2004: D-Day - Casting and Voice Director
- 2004: Yager - Casting and Voice Director
- 2004: Conflict: Vietnam - Casting and Voice Director
- 2005: Kameo: Elements of Power - Casting and Voice-Over Director
- 2005: Juiced - Casting and Voice-Over Director
- 2005: Spartan: Total Warrior - Casting and Voice Director
- 2005: WipEout Pure - Casting and Voice Director
- 2005: Perfect Dark Zero - Casting and Voice Director
- 2005: TimeSplitters: Future Perfect - Casting Director
- 2005: Wallace & Gromit: The Curse of the Were-Rabbit - Casting and Dialogue Director
- 2005: Sniper Elite - Voice Director
- 2005: Conflict: Global Storm - Casting and Voice Director
- 2006: Rogue Trooper - Casting and Voice Director
- 2006: Anno 1701 - Casting and Voice Director
- 2006: Paraworld - Casting and Voice Director
- 2006: ProStroke Golf: World Tour 2007 - Voice Director
- 2007: Formula One Championship Edition - Casting and Voice Director
- 2007: Clive Barker's Jericho - Casting and Voice Director
- 2007: Wipeout Pulse - Casting and Voice Director
- 2007: The Witcher - Casting and Voice Director
- 2008: Memento Mori - Casting and Voice Director
- 2008: Codename Panzers: Cold War - Casting and Voice Director
- 2008: Haze - Casting and Voice Director
- 2008: WorldShift - Casting and Voice Director
- 2008: Ankh 3: Battle of the God - Casting and Voice Director
- 2008: So Blonde - Casting and Voice Director
- 2009: Wallace & Gromit's Grand Adventures: 1, 2, 3, 4 - Casting and Voice-over Director, Actor of "Gabberly"
- 2009: Trine - Casting and Voice Director
- 2009: Tales of Monkey Island: Chapter 1, 2, 3, 4, 5 - Voice-Over Supervisor (UK)
- 2009: Divinity II: Ego Draconis - Casting Director
- 2009: Anno 1404 - Casting and Voice Director, Actor
- 2009: Ceville - Casting and Voice Director, Actor
- 2009: Venetica - Casting and Voice Director, Actor
- 2009: The Book of Unwritten Tales - Casting & Voice Director (UK)
- 2010: Dead Nation - Voice Director
- 2010: TV Superstars - Voice Director
- 2010: Pro Evolution Soccer 2010 - Voice Director
- 2011: Bunch of Heroes - Casting & Voice Director
- 2011: Driver: San Francisco - Casting & Voice Director
- 2011: SOCOM 4: U.S. Navy SEALs - Casting and Voice Director (UK)
- 2011: Geronimo Stilton and the Kingdom of Fantasy - Casting and Voice Director (UK)
- 2011: Risen 2: Dark Waters - Casting and Voice Director (UK)
- 2012: Trine 2 - Casting and Voice Director (UK)
- 2012: Deponia - Casting and Voice Director
- 2012: Anno 2070 - Casting and Voice Director
- 2012: RuneScape - Casting and Voice Director
- 2012: Wipeout 2048 - Casting and Voice Director
- 2012: Wonderbook: Book of Spells - Casting and Voice Director
- 2012: Chaos on Deponia - Casting and Voice Director
- 2013: Wonderbook: Book of Potions - Casting & Voice Director
- 2013: Patrician III - Casting & Voice Director
- 2013: Spellforce: Demons of the Past - Casting & Voice Director
- 2013: The Wolf Among Us - Casting and Voice Director (UK)
- 2013: Wonderbook: Diggs Nightcrawler - Casting & Voice Director
- 2013: Broken Sword: The Serpent's Curse - Casting Director
- 2013: Goodbye Deponia - Casting & Voice Director
- 2013: The Night of the Rabbit - Casting & Voice Director
- 2014: Transformers Universe - Casting Director
- 2014: Arena of Fate - Casting & Voice Director
- 2014: Game of Thrones (2014 video game) - Casting & Voice Director (UK)
- 2014: Randal's Monday - Casting & Voice Director
- 2015: The Book of Unwritten Tales 2 - Casting & Voice Director (UK)

== See also ==
- Outsource Media
