= Goteki =

British electro band

- Origin: Bristol, England
- Genres: Electro, indietronica, industrial, electropop, EBM
- Years active: 2000–2007( Previously known as Sneaky Bat Machine ) 2008–2012
- Labels: Wasp Factory Records, Alphastar Records, RebCo Records
- Members: Ross Tregenza; Clive 'Crash' Lewis; Ali-Star
- Past members: Dr. A Yan-Yan; Eddie Green; Rosie Harris; Banda
- Website: goteki.co.uk

Goteki (/ɡɒˈtɛki/) are a British electro band. They are the musical brainchild of composer Ross Tregenza. They were heavily involved in the development of UK electronic body music (EBM) and cybergoth genres in the early 2000s. Goteki split up in 2006, but reformed in 2008 as a three piece live act expanded from Tregenza's solo studio creations. They refer to their new musical style as 'death electro': a mix of alternative electro pop and industrial combined with influences from film and video game scores.

== Current activity ==
Goteki's reformation in August 2008 saw them return as a two-piece (Ross Tregenza and Alastair Power, performing under the names of Tregenza and Ali-Star). They were re-joined in 2009 by Clive 'Crash' Lewis. They returned with a more mature sound, but with recognizable qualities from their older material.

== History ==
=== Formation ===
The group was formed after Tregenza's former band, Sneaky Bat Machine (SBM), ended. The group took their name from one of the teams in the PlayStation game Wipeout 3 (eventually securing Sony's blessing to use the name). The original Goteki line-up consisted of ex-SBM members Tregenza on vocals, Clive Lewis on synths, and Bruce Attley on synthesizers and samples.

=== Fight the Saucermen and Goteki O/S ===
The band's first release was the Fight the Saucermen EP which was released in early 2000 on Wasp Factory Records. The EP received encouraging reviews. After touring extensively the band started working on their first album.

This album was released in 2002 under the name Goteki O/S. It contains 17 tracks and is something of a concept album, divided into "phases" separated by instrumental tracks. For example, Signal One – Nihon is followed by the tracks Geisha Deconstruct and Ninjagrrl, which are inspired by Japanese culture. The album itself is rather eclectic in its style, songs range from ambient electronica to harsh drum and bass. All music on the album was, written and arranged by Tregenza, but there are also several guest appearances by other EBM musicians, such as Sebastian Komor of Icon of Coil and Jared Louche of Chemlab. It received rave reviews – Future Music called it a "Synthpop Happy Hardcore Melange that somehow works", and Kerrang Magazine lovingly called the band "Futuristic Nutjobs". For a selection of Goteki O/S reviews and increased the band's popularity within the cyber scene. The band played at Whitby Gothic Weekend's 10th Anniversary Festival.

=== Goteki O/S : Corrupted Files ===
The album Goteki O/S was followed by Goteki O/S : Corrupted Files, a remix album which contained remixes from bands such as DeathBoy, Icon of Coil and Sigue Sigue Sputnik.

In late 2003, the band announced that they were taking a new direction, concentrating on live performance aspects and using a human drummer for the first time. With this shift in direction singer Tregenza dropped his former pseudonym Sneaky. A shake-up of the band's line up followed in 2004: Doktor A left the band and was replaced by Ali Star (real name Alastair Power) on bass and Yan-Yan (real name Lilian Cheung) on percussion.

Goteki played at the 10th goth festival Convergence in 2004; this marked their US debut. At this point, the band were without a label, so Goteki's second album Revolution was an Internet-only download release. In 2005, the band also reached an international audience when some of their music was used on the soundtrack of Timesplitters Future Perfect.

=== Revolution ===
In late 2005, Clive Lewis left the band and was replaced by Edy Green on lead guitar. Due to heavy demand for a CD to be released, Goteki re-released Revolution with their own label, Alphastar Records, in late 2005. The album featured 17 tracks spanning a production time that overlapped with "Goteki O/S: Corrupted File"s. The album included the track Shinjuku Lullaby which would feature on Xbox game 'Project Gotham Racing 3'. It also featured a second remix by Graeme Norgate (under the alias Vi Rez) reprising his role as remixer on the Corrupted Files album.

By this stage, band members were becoming tied up in other activities. Yan-Yan left the band in 2006 to pursue a career in modeling and fashion photography, and was replaced by Tregenza's long-time friend Rosie Harris. Tregenza himself joined the newly reformed Visage, playing guitar for their comeback tour. Sales of Revolution were disappointing, and Tregenza was frustrated that the band did not get the attention he felt they deserved. Goteki disbanded in March 2006. Their last performance took place at Electrofest on 30 April 2006.

=== Present (2008 reformation) ===
After disbanding Goteki, Ross announced work on a new project named Jetstream Lovers with members Edy and Ali Star. The group's original name, The Radio Stars, had to be changed for copyright reasons. In 2007, Tregenza surprised fans by announcing a new Goteki album would be released in 2008, containing previously unreleased Goteki tracks, as well as new compositions.

2008 saw Tregenza and Power starting a new electro project Lamorna, as which they played a few UK dates and began plans for an album. Summer 2008 saw them play a charity reunion gig, playing Goteki and Sneaky Bat Machine songs at Elektrowerkz in London, with former members Yan Yan, Crash and Sneaky Bat Machine's Maxislag. In August 2008, the fact that Lamorna sounded ever more like Goteki combined with the nostalgia that the charity gig evoked prompted Ross Tregenza to announce the reformation of Goteki. Their first act as a reformed band was to compile their material to date as a 'best of' album. It was released digitally in January 2009 under the name 'ROBOTS NINJAS PORNSTARS WARFARE: The Best of Goteki 2000–2008'

Shows in Bristol, Oxford and London in May and June 2008 saw the return of Goteki with the new full line up. Tregenza and Ali Star were rejoined by longtime member Clive Lewis and new female vocalist Banda. Banda was also slated to appear as co-singer on a number of 5 track EPs the band advertised as coming out throughout the Summer of 2009. Promoting the release schedule as 'The Summer of Santa Muerte', the band announced the first of the four EPs to be 'Shoot Me Dead' to be released 4 July, followed by 'Journey To Storyville' on 25 July. These were followed in August by 'Atlantic Pacific' and 'Take Me To Your Lover'. A full album 'Santa Muerte' was slated for release in the winter. Promotional flyers claimed the album would be a 'tornado of sex, death, sand & neon'.

'Santa Muerte' is finally released in January 2011 after some production delays, and met with acclaim from fans and press. The band began work on a remix album slated for release on 11 December or 12 January. In the meantime, Tregenza decides to move the entire band's back catalog to Creative Commons, and releases everything from Fight The Saucermen through to the Summer of Santa Muerte EPs for free from the website.

== Line-up ==
=== Current members ===
- Ross Tregenza ("Sneaky") – vocals, programming
- Clive Lewis ("Crash 303") – synth, backing vocals
- Ali Star – bass

=== Former members ===
- Banda – vocals
- Yan-Yan – percussion, synths, backing vocals
- Bruce Attley ("Doktor A") – samples, backing vocals
- Edy Green – lead guitar
- Rosie Harris – synths, vocals

== Discography ==
=== As "Sneaky Bat Machine" ===
- Disco 4 the Dead (1998) (Darkbeat Records)
- Boneshaker (1999) (Darkbeat Records)
- Disco 4 the Dead 2: Another Dementia (2005) (self-released)

=== As "Goteki" ===
- Fight the Saucermen EP (2000) (Wasp Factory Recordings)
- Goteki O/S (2002) (Wasp Factory Recordings)
- Goteki O/S: Corrupted Files (2003) (Wasp Factory Recordings)
- Revolution (2005) (Alphastar Records)

=== As "Jetstream Lovers" ===
- Voodoo Nature (2007) ([Lineout Records])

=== As "Goteki ( reformed )" ===
- Robots Ninjas Pornstars Warfare: The Best of Goteki VOl 1 ( 2000–2008 ) (2008) (Alphastar Digital)
- Santa Muerte Session 1: Shoot Me Dead (2009) (Alphastar Digital)
- Santa Muerte Session 2: Journey to Storyville (2009) (Alphastar Digital)
- Santa Muerte Session 3: Atlantic Pacific (2009) (Alphastar Digital)
- Santa Muerte Session 4: Take Me to Your Lover (2009) (Alphastar Digital)
- Santa Muerte: The Melancholy Death of Nevada Dawn (2010) (RebCo Records / Alphastar Digital)
- Disco Muerte – Part 1: Dying Under Desert Stars (2011) (Alphastar Digital)
- Disco Muerte – Part 2: Death Exodus (2011) (Alphastar Digital)
- Disco Muerte – Part 3: The Void (2012) (Alphastar Digital)
- Disco Muerte – Part 4: Death is Not the End (2012) (Alphastar Digital)

=== Other ===
Goteki have also written material for the TimeSplitters video game series, notably TimeSplitters 2 and TimeSplitters Future Perfect. Their track "Shinjuku Lullaby" was used as an in-game track for Project Gotham Racing 3. Tregenza also worked as a Sound Designer on the videogames Haze and Rogue Warrior

Goteki performed a cover of the Nine Inch Nails track "Suck" on the tribute album Recovered in Nails: A Tribute to Nine Inch Nails.
