= TimeSplitters (disambiguation) =

TimeSplitters is a video game series.

TimeSplitters may also refer to:

- TimeSplitters (video game), a 2000 video game, first in the series
- Time Splitters (professional wrestling), tag team active from 2012 to 2015
