= Beyond Words =

Beyond Words may refer to:

- Beyond Words Publishing, an American book publishing company
- Beyond Words (1997 film), Dutch documentary film by Louis van Gasteren
- Beyond Words (2017 film), Dutch-Polish drama film by Urszula Antoniak
- Beyond Words (video game), a 2026 video game
- Beyond Words, a 2002 Bobby McFerrin album
