= Scott Lamb =

Scott Lamb may refer to:

- DeathBoy, the pseudonym of English musician Scott Lamb
- Scott Lamb (lawyer), Canadian politician
- Scott Lamb (speedway rider), Scottish motorcycle speedway rider
- Scott Lamb, American musician with We Are Scientists
