= Beyond Words (video game) =

2026 video game

- Developer: MindFuel Games
- Publisher: PQube
- Platforms: Windows; Nintendo Switch; PlayStation 5; Xbox Series X/S
- Release: 9 April 2026
- Mode: Single-player

Beyond Words is a 2026 word game based on Scrabble with roguelike elements. It was developed by MindFuel Games, a studio founded by Steve Ellis and David Doak, who had previously worked at Rare and founded Free Radical Design, and published by PQube. The game was announced in November 2025 and released on 9 April 2026 for Windows, Nintendo Switch, PlayStation 5, and Xbox Series X and Series S.

The game received "mixed or average" reviews on Windows and "generally favorable" reviews on Nintendo Switch. The game's concept drew both positive and negative reviews, the gameplay was generally praised, and the art drew negative feedback, including for the use of AI art during development.

== Gameplay ==
Beyond Words is a single-player turn-based word game based on Scrabble, with roguelike elements. The player has a hand of tiles corresponding to letters and places them on the board; letters spell words and the player scores points based on the point values of the letters and the length of the words. Similarly to Scrabble, tiles are randomly drawn from a bag, but there are many more wildcard tiles. Each round, the player is given a limited number of moves to score a certain point total. Winning rounds grants the player coins; between rounds, the player can buy cards that increase their future ability to score points in various ways.

== Development and release ==
Beyond Words was created by Steve Ellis and David Doak, who had previously developed first-person shooter titles at Rare and Free Radical Design. They founded British studio MindFuel Games, which announced Beyond Words as its first title after 18 months of development. Ellis and Doak described their choice to found a small studio and move away from the FPS space as a result of previous experiences with the large teams required for development of those titles leading to their studios being closed down.

MindFuel announced Beyond Words and released a demo on 27 November 2025. The game was released on 9 April 2026 for Windows, Nintendo Switch, PlayStation 5, and Xbox Series X and Series S.

== Reception ==
Beyond Words received "mixed or average" reviews on Windows and "generally favorable" reviews on Nintendo Switch, according to review aggregator Metacritic. 87% of critics recommended the game, according to OpenCritic.

The concept and gameplay execution of Beyond Words drew both criticism and praise. Writing for PC Gamer, Robin Valentine described Beyond Words as better than other games that had tried to mix Balatro and Scrabble, commenting that the game "finds the perfect balance between synergy and spelling". Editorial director Julian Benson of Rock Paper Shotgun said that the game "came alive" when its various systems of power-ups came together, but found those moments frustratingly rare. Nintendo Life's Mitch Vogel described the game's mechanics as derivative of Balatro, saying "it would've been nice to see MindFuel do more to expand upon the mechanics of its inspiration".

Matt of Digitally Downloaded described the game's two inspirations as at odds with one another: "Scrabble, despite being a game where you draw letters at random, is not a game of chance. It's a game of great skill and knowledge, and playing well within a simple system. Roguelikes, meanwhile, are about a combination of luck and manipulating a system to maximise the points." Despite this, they rated it 4.5/5, calling it a "Sunday morning coffee game". Writing for Siliconera, Graham Russell criticized the concept of the game, perceiving the developers as not having done design work on top of their inspirations.

Initial versions of the game were illustrated with AI art, which drew criticism, including from Valentine and Russell, though this art was replaced later in development. Russell nevertheless described the visuals of the final game as "boring and soulless".
