= TimeSplitters =

- Genre: First-person shooter
- Developer: Free Radical Design
- Publishers: Eidos Interactive (2000–2002); Electronic Arts (2005)
- Creators: Steve Ellis; David Doak
- Platforms: PlayStation 2; GameCube; Xbox
- First release: TimeSplitters; October 26, 2000
- Latest release: TimeSplitters: Future Perfect; March 21, 2005

TimeSplitters is a series of first-person shooter video games developed by Free Radical Design. The games are often considered spiritual successors to the Nintendo 64 titles GoldenEye 007 (1997) and Perfect Dark (2000), due to overlapping elements in gameplay, design, and development team. Each game features a time travelling element in which players battle across a diverse number of locations and periods in history.

The series' three games were released between 2000 and 2005, with the first as an exclusive launch title for the PlayStation 2. Development on a fourth game was being undertaken by a reformed version of Free Radical, owned by Deep Silver, a subsidiary of Embracer Group, but the game was cancelled when Free Radical was closed down in 2023.

The trilogy was re-released for PlayStation 4 and PlayStation 5 as PS2 classics in 2024, with trophy support, a rewind feature and improved loading times.

== Games ==
Aggregate review scores As of March 4, 2013.
Game	Metacritic
TimeSplitters	(PS2) 81
TimeSplitters 2	(PS2) 90 (GC) 88 (Xbox) 88
TimeSplitters: Future Perfect	(PS2) 84 (Xbox) 83 (GC) 82

=== TimeSplitters ===
The first game in the series was developed by Free Radical Design and released in October 2000, alongside the launch of the PlayStation 2. The game's story focuses around a temporal war against the TimeSplitters, creatures that use time crystals to travel through time, and by doing so, are disrupting human history. Its levels take place across different time periods between the years 1935 and 2035.

=== TimeSplitters 2 ===
The second game in the series was released in October 2002. Unlike its predecessor, TimeSplitters 2 was also released for the Xbox and GameCube in addition to the PlayStation 2. It featured similar story elements to the previous game, based around the TimeSplitters and their time crystals spread across multiple centuries, and expanded the concept heavily, including the introduction of characters that would later be used in its sequel, such as the lead character, Sergeant Cortez, a parody of Riddick.

=== TimeSplitters: Future Perfect ===
The series' third installment was released in March 2005. Future Perfect's story played a larger role than in prior games in exploring the origins of the TimeSplitter species, introducing their creator, Jacob Crow, and including the concept of characters interacting with their own past and future selves. This was the first TimeSplitters game to feature online multiplayer, which was included for the Xbox and PlayStation 2; however, this feature was omitted from the GameCube version.

=== TimeSplitters Rewind ===
On November 29, 2012, it was revealed that, partly in response to a petition for the release of an HD version of the series' original trilogy, a group of fans had been given permission by Crytek to develop a TimeSplitters mod using CryEngine 3. The project lead, Michael Hubicka, stated that:

"TimeSplitters 4 is our ultimate goal, but first we have to convince Crytek there is sufficient demand for the series through [an] HD Collection."

The game, named TimeSplitters Rewind, combines "greatest hits" elements from across the trilogy. The team have stated that, although the engine gives Rewind more of a modern look, they "didn't plan on fixing something that isn't broken." It features both story and multiplayer modes and is free of charge on the PC. The development team originally planned to develop the game using the Unreal Engine 4; however, in 2017, they revealed an intention to instead use CryEngine 3, due to concerns that the Unreal version would be unable to "use the TimeSplitters IP and would likely have to re-brand."

In January 2020, the team announced a shift in the game's intended release model, stating that they would begin by releasing a small, but "feasible" amount of content initially, followed later by further maps and content. In September 2020, new gameplay footage was released, over which the project's lead writer stated that "the game is looking and feeling really close", and had 57 people working on it. This was followed by a further update in December 2021 which indicated that the game was entering a "second round of QA testing", although no release window was provided at the time. However, on October 26, 2025, the anniversary of the North American release of the original TimeSplitters, the Rewind team launched an official website for the game, which prominently featured a countdown to November 23, the date when the game released.

=== Future and cancelled games ===
==== TimeSplitters 4 ====
In June 2007, the Official UK PlayStation Magazine reported on a rumour that another installment of the TimeSplitters series was in development by Free Radical as an exclusive for the PlayStation 3. In the following August, Rob Yescombe, scriptwriter for the series' previous title, confirmed that "TimeSplitters 4 is happening", but stated that the game was "in the very early concept stages, and as yet it's unsigned to any publisher." Despite the previously rumoured PS3 exclusivity, Yescombe stated that no specific release platforms had been established. "I'm sure it's possible to do a control scheme that works", co-creator David Doak added, when asked about his thoughts on developing a first-person shooter for the Wii. Of the game's timeline, Yescombe stated that "the game's not a very long way away but it's not a very short way away either. It's somewhere in the middle."

A further announcement of the game took place on the Free Radical website the following October. An early logo revealed for the game was a parody of the Gears of War logo, with a monkey head replacing the skull from the original. Free Radical also sent out an early teaser trailer depicting a monkey in Master Chief's combat armour from the Halo franchise. This led to expectation of "in-game potshots" at those games and other gaming franchises, a prediction confirmed by Yescombe:

"In the past Timesplitters has been very satirical at the expense of movies, this time it will be satirical at the expense of video games."

Free Radical released further details on TimeSplitters 4 in 2008, mentioning that it would not use the much-criticised Haze engine, instead opting for some "new and double shiny tech;" however, after going into administration, Free Radical was bought out by Crytek and rebranded as Crytek UK in February 2009. Following this acquisition, the TimeSplitters project was subsequently placed "on hold." In a later interview, co-creator Steve Ellis confirmed that:

"TimeSplitters 4 was in the very early stages of development when Free Radical went into administration ... A small playable demo was shown to several publishers, but it didn't attract any publishing deals."

The poor reception for Free Radical's previous game, Haze, was cited as one of the main reasons for the lack of publisher interest, alongside the lack of marketability for "a game that is based around a diverse set of characters and environments."

On June 14, 2011, the website VideoGamer.com, citing "a high-ranking industry source at Crytek," revealed that the company was working on a new TimeSplitters game, to be released on "the next generation of consoles" (the successors to the Xbox 360 and PlayStation 3). The game was expected to utilize CryEngine 3 and DirectX 11 technology. In 2012, Crytek CEO Cevat Yerli expressed desire to work on the project, but also noted concern about its possible reception. He mentioned that crowdfunding a sequel had been suggested to him, but deemed doing so to be inappropriate for a larger company such as Crytek. Yerli's comments about a possible crowdfunding campaign prompted a petition to encourage such a venture, which Yerli himself endorsed; however, as of February 2014, the petition's page had reached only approximately half of the desired 100,000 supporters.

On April 27, 2012, a spokesperson from Crytek confirmed that TimeSplitters 4 was "not in development", and in June 2012, Yerli stated that:

"Look, I wish we were working on it. The thing with TimeSplitters is, if we made a sequel to TimeSplitters, nobody would accept this apart from some fans, and we don't know how big the fan community is unfortunately."

In July 2013, TechRadar spoke to Ellis who, when asked if TimeSplitters 4 would ever be released on 8th generation consoles (such as PlayStation 4 and Xbox One), replied with a statement suggesting it was highly unlikely:

"I don't think there's any chance that's going to happen, you always got to the point where the marketing person in the room would say 'I don't know how to sell this' because they want a character that they can put on the front of the box. Every marketing person and every publisher we spoke to [said] 'You can't have that as your selling point' and maybe the sales figures of previous games backed that up."

This prediction was made more concrete by the shutdown of Crytek UK in 2014, with the majority of the company's staff moving to Deep Silver's Dambuster Studios.

In April 2018, a collection of previously unrevealed concept art for the game was made available on Reddit, showing characters from multiple time periods and locations, including Ancient Greece and 1950s United States.

==== TimeSplitters 2 HD remake ====
During an interview in 2012 about their mobile game studio, Crash Lab, former Free Radical team members Steve Ellis, Martin Wakeley and Lee Musgrave confirmed that an HD version of TimeSplitters 2 had been in development as a downloadable product during 2008; however, the product was never released before Free Radical shut down. Ellis expressed a desire to see the HD version released eventually, opining that "it could be the catalyst that is required in order to raise enough interest in TimeSplitters 4 that a publisher might want to fund it."

As an easter egg within Homefront: The Revolution, developed by Dambuster Studios and released by Deep Silver in 2016, players could use an in-game arcade machine to play the first two levels of TimeSplitters 2, remade in high-definition. During 2021 interviews, developer Matt Phillips revealed that the game actually contained a full 4K resolution remake of the game. The unlock code required to access the full version, including multiplayer features, if the arcade machine were moved to a different map, had since been lost by Phillips: however, he had given it previously to a friend to "leak" in a Discord channel, which the friend had been banned for from the channel, thereby allowing Xbox principal software engineer Spencer Perreault to obtain the code several days after the interview and share it on Twitter. An insider source later confirmed to Eurogamer that the unlock codes were from the original game likely for testing or press versions and that the easter egg had only ever been intended to cover the first two levels; however, the fastest way to include those levels was to include the full story mode, with a "soft-lock" in place. Dambuster only realised there was a way to unlock the full game after Homefront shipped.

In another easter egg, this time within the November 2020 "Fallen God" expansion for SpellForce 3, published by THQ Nordic, whose parent company, the Embracer Group, acquired the rights to TimeSplitters in 2018, players found an item for sale by an in-game vendor named "TimeSplitters 2 Remake." The item contained the following in-game blurb:

"It's finally coming! The iconic shooter, which has stood the test of time to join the era of modern games."

This led to speculation that the company were planning to release this remake as a genuine product; however, a spokesperson for THQ Nordic confirmed that the item was "just an innocent Easter egg" and the vendor was "a character known especially for not telling the truth." A subsequent statement from THQ stated that:

"The intention behind those easter eggs was pure fun. When Koch Media and Deep Silver are ready to talk about TimeSplitters, they will make sure to get heard."

==== Untitled TimeSplitters game ====
In August 2018, Koch Media, a subsidiary of THQ Nordic AB, announced that they had acquired the intellectual property and publishing rights for TimeSplitters, with the intention of publishing future games in the series via their Deep Silver publishing company. In August 2019, THQ Nordic announced in their financial report that Steve Ellis had joined the company to "help plot the future course for [the TimeSplitters] franchise." Ellis stated that the series' "time has now come" and expressed hopes that "the original team will join hands again." Later that month, Dambuster Studios, which includes several former Free Radical staff members, replied to a fan on Twitter, confirming that Ellis had a team "handling the next TimeSplitters product." The series' other creator, David Doak, confirmed in an interview that he "isn't directly involved with this new interpretation," but expressed a desire to see it return as a "social experience", rather than a traditional boxed-game product.

On 20 May 2021, Deep Silver announced via Twitter that it was reforming Free Radical Design as a new Deep Silver studio (based in Nottingham, England, location of the original Free Radical headquarters) to create the next entry in the TimeSplitters franchise. It was also announced that the new Free Radical would be headed not just by Ellis, but also by Doak, marking the return of both franchise creators amongst other "key original members;" however, it did confirm that development on the new game had not yet started, and would begin "in the coming months", once the studio was fully established.

On 8 November 2023, it was reported that Free Radical Design, who is owned by Embracer Group, was at risk of being closed. People close to the company said that the studio was part of an evaluation and employees had been notified that it could be closed. In the lead up to Christmas 2023 it was announced that Free Radical had closed. Many of its employees posted goodbye messages to Twitter and the official website was updated to read "404 Company not found :(".

== Gameplay ==
Each of the TimeSplitters games are first-person shooters which also feature elements of exploration and puzzle-solving. Multiplayer is a core gameplay element, both co-operative such as allowing two players to play through story missions together and competitive multiplayer; however, these multiplayer elements were local play only, without online multiplayer, until the release of TimeSplitters: Future Perfect.

The series' visual style uses character models and expressions emphasizing more caricatured, cartoon-like qualities and comic book-inspired design, supported by animators from traditional 2D animation backgrounds. Many of the characters represent parodies of established pop culture stereotypes, such as the aristocratic English explorer or the suave secret agent, and many aspects of the series focus on often surreal and self-deprecating humor.

=== Story mode ===
The games' story mode consists of a series of missions that can be played by either one or two players. In the first TimeSplitters, story missions are based upon the retrieval of a key object such as a time crystal and its successful return. TimeSplitters 2 and TimeSplitters: Future Perfect introduced additional story mode objectives and more complex levels.

=== Arcade mode ===
Arcade mode is the multiplayer aspect of the TimeSplitters series, but also provides the option to include AI-controlled bots with configurable difficulty levels, to act in place of human players. The games are notable for their large selection of multiplayer modes (such as a total of 16 different competition modes in TimeSplitters 2), spanning both traditional Deathmatch and Capture the Flag-type games, as well as other TimeSplitters-specific modes such as "Flame Tag", "Virus", "Shrink", and "Monkey Assistant." The games also provide players with options to customise multiple details of each game mode, such as rules and available weapons, to create a more varied experience.

In arcade mode, players can choose from a variety of playable characters (a total of 150 in Future Perfect, for example), each with distinct attributes in areas such as speed and stamina.

TimeSplitters 2 introduced "Arcade League": a single-player challenge mode using the structure of arcade Mode. In arcade league, players compete against AI bots to earn trophies and unlock additional arcade mode content, such as playable characters.

=== Challenge mode ===
Challenge mode, available in all games of the series, consists of sets of single-player minigame challenges. The challenges, often with an imposed time limit, span a broad variety of gameplay styles, such as defending against zombies, collecting bananas as a monkey, racing robot cats, and smashing windows with a brick. Rewards, such as additional characters and weapons for arcade mode, are granted to players upon successful completion of challenges.

=== MapMaker ===
Each game in the series included "MapMaker": a grid-based level editor in which players could create their own custom content. The first game in the series only allowed creation of multiplayer arcade mode maps, whereas TimeSplitters 2 allowed players to also create single-player story levels with objectives. The third game added the ability to create maps which take place outdoors, whereas previous games had only allowed the creation of indoor maps. The online component added to Future Perfect meant players were able to upload and rate MapMaker creations for online sharing.

== Development ==
=== TimeSplitters and TimeSplitters 2 (1999–2002) ===
The TimeSplitters games were developed by Free Radical Design, a development company based in the Midlands, UK. Free Radical was founded in 1999 by five people, all of whom had previously worked for Rare on the Nintendo 64 first-person shooters GoldenEye 007 and Perfect Dark for a year and a half of development, but before its release: directors David Doak and Steve Ellis set up the company, and were then followed by director Karl Hilton, soundtrack composer Graeme Norgate, and Lee Ray. As a result of this shared development team, gameplay similarities, and occasionally overlapping settings (such as a Russian dam, as featured in TimeSplitters 2), the TimeSplitters franchise is often compared to these predecessors, and considered to be their "spiritual successor."

Free Radical made an agreement with Eidos Interactive in February 1999 to "work for roughly three years on a novel FPS". Although it was not the first game worked on by the team–the first being an FPS with the working title of Redemption: what would later become Second Sight– TimeSplitters began development after the company received approval to obtain a PlayStation 2 devkit, which were difficult to obtain and decided to focus on creating a more straightforward shooter whose pace would suit the new console's power, and which could be developed in time for the PlayStation 2's delayed launch date. The team approached the project with the intent of increasing not just pace, but also the quantity/variety of enemies compared to GoldenEye and Perfect Dark. In the words of David Doak:

"Steve [Ellis, lead programmer] got something up and running really quickly. I think Sony were really impressed; their experience had been that people would take six months, eight months, a year to get anything working at all on PS2. It was down to Steve's technical ability: he had a first-person thing up and running fairly quickly."

In October 2000, following initial development under the working title of MPG (Multiplayer Game), the completed TimeSplitters became Free Radical's first game release, and was the only PlayStation 2 launch title developed in Europe.

This was followed directly by TimeSplitters 2 in October 2002, which was developed in less than two years and released simultaneously for PlayStation 2, Xbox, and GameCube. Like its predecessor, TimeSplitters 2 was published by Eidos Interactive. Eidos had originally stated that they would not support a GameCube version, claiming it "had no relationship with Nintendo"; however, they reversed that decision once Free Radical offered the publishing rights to Activision.

David Doak described TimeSplitters 2 as "what we thought the first game should have been ... all the ideas we'd had along the way." This included strengthening the single-player mode, which had received criticism for its lack of depth in the multiplayer-focused original. Development for the sequel had begun the very next day after the game was completed in September 2000, and would ultimately include enhancements such as a new animation system and improved special effects.

=== TimeSplitters: Future Perfect (2003–2005) ===
In 2003, a decision was made for Eidos to part ways with Free Radical. Following this, the team were approached by Electronic Arts, who said that they "love the TimeSplitters series and they wanted to get involved with it." In January 2004, EA announced that it would be publishing the series' third entry in the following year, promising "improved gameplay functions, completely revamped graphics, a wholly original storyline and all-new online play". The game's development team felt that the questions asked by EA during the early stages of its development helped them to refine their process, providing a "fresh approach which encouraged us to focus on specific issues." For this third game, the team had also shifted to a model where the level designers would choose settings that were "interesting to them" and the lead writers would then establish a narrative to connect those separate elements.

TimeSplitters: Future Perfect, was released in March 2005, following on from Free Radical's first non-TimeSplitters game, Second Sight, in 2004. Prior to the game's release, the developers expressed a desire to establish an "ongoing relationship" with EA; however, in later interviews, Doak reflected that the game "wasn't successful because EA buried it", recalling a scenario where he was told by an EA rep that there would not be significant marketing investment, because it was instead being invested in GoldenEye: Rogue Agent, developed by EA Los Angeles. Doak recounts being told that "your game's really good, but unfortunately we've got another game which has turned out to not be as good as we thought it was going to be, and we need to support it with the marketing money." In Doak's words:

"We did Future Perfect with EA and I think delivered an amazingly good game, but they didn't make the effort to sell it ... and by that time Free Radical was a fairly big company, so we had a lot of mouths to feed. We were quite cross with them, to put it mildly."

=== Future TimeSplitters games (2007–2023) ===
Following confirmation in 2007 that work on it had begun, TimeSplitters 4, having failed to secure a publishing deal, was placed on hold when Free Radical was taken over by Crytek, becoming Crytek UK in 2009. This was followed in 2014 by the closure of Crytek, at which time, the majority of staff were relocated to Dambuster Studios.

In August 2018, Koch Media acquired the rights to TimeSplitters, and by 2019 had hired series co-creator Steve Ellis to plan the series' future. Work on "[bringing] the TimeSplitters franchise back to life" was confirmed in May 2021 with the reformation of Free Radical Design (as part of Deep Silver), although development had not yet begun on the game by that time.

In November 2021, Microsoft added backwards compatibility to the Xbox Series X/S and Xbox One for both TimeSplitters 2 and TimeSplitters: Future Perfect, as part of an Xbox 20th anniversary event.
