= Music to Crash Cars To =

Studio album by DeathBoy
- Released: May 10, 2003
- Recorded: 2003
- Genre: Industrial, Breakbeat
- Length: 73:20
- Label: Wasp Factory Recordings
- Producer: Scott Lamb, Lee Chaos

DeathBoy chronology
Music to Crash Cars To (2003)	End of an Error (2006)

Professional ratings
Review scores
Source	Rating
Terrorizer	(8/10)
Meltdown Magazine	4/5 stars
Mick Mercer	(extremely favourable)

Music to Crash Cars To was the debut release by UK Industrial band DeathBoy. It was released in 2003 by Wasp Factory Recordings (WASPFAC021). It is available as a download from Line Out Recordings. The album was produced and mastered by Scott Lamb in conjunction with Lee Chaos of Wasp Factory Recordings at the beginning of 2003 in London and Cheltenham. Due to copyright issues with samples on Crawlout, the film quotes were revoiced by Scott, Marcus Lanyon of Tarantella Serpentine and Tom and Laura from the US band VX. The CD has a reversible cover. The front cover shows a smashed up car (which was discovered by the band on Ealing Common in London). The car was originally blue, and far less damaged than the final shot on the cover. The front cover shot was taken the day after the band shot from the inlay, in which time the car had been smashed up a lot more. The "reverse" cover shows a mock-up of an accident site, with some flowers tied to a lamp post - it is not a picture of a real accident site.

== Track listing ==
1. "We Will Destroy"
2. "Computer #1"
3. "Hellisontheway"
4. "Decimate"
5. "Parasite"
6. "Crawlout"
7. "Demons"
8. "Killer"
9. "Change (Apocalypse Remix)"
10. "I Know You Know"
11. "Lost Again"
12. "Sick World"
13. "Music To Crash Cars To"
14. "Heat Death"
