= TimeSplitters (video game) =

2000 video game

- European cover art
- Developer: Free Radical Design
- Publisher: Eidos Interactive
- Designer: David Doak
- Programmers: Steve Ellis; Hasit Zala; Joe Moulding
- Artists: Karl Hilton; Rob Steptoe
- Composer: Graeme Norgate
- Series: TimeSplitters
- Platform: PlayStation 2
- Release: NA: 26 October 2000; EU: 24 November 2000
- Genre: First-person shooter
- Modes: Single-player, multiplayer

TimeSplitters is a first-person shooter video game, developed by Free Radical Design, published by Eidos Interactive, and released in 2000 as a PlayStation 2 launch title. The game's premise focuses on players controlling a variety of different characters across different time periods over a span of 100 years, seeking to resolve a personal matter involving their own foes, which brings them into contact with an alien race known as the TimeSplitters, who seek to interfere.

Much of the gameplay bears similar aspects to previous FPS games, primarily GoldenEye 007 and Perfect Dark. Alongside the story mode, the game features additional game modes, including multiplayer, as well as a map maker for players to create custom maps. The game received favorable reviews upon release, and later spawned two sequels – TimeSplitters 2 in 2002; and TimeSplitters: Future Perfect in 2005.

TimeSplitters, along with the other games in the trilogy, were rereleased on the PlayStation 4 and PlayStation 5 as a PS2 Classic in 2024, with trophy support, a rewind feature and improved loading times.

== Gameplay ==
A screenshot of the Chinese level in TimeSplitters.

As a first-person shooter game, TimeSplitters bears several gameplay and presentational similarities to GoldenEye 007 and Perfect Dark, including a similar aiming system and unlockable options through quick level completions. The game features several modes for players to partake in, including story mode and multiplayer modes.

The game's story mode can be played alone or co-operatively with one additional player. Every level in story mode can be played on three difficulty settings; several aspects, such as the enemies' aggressiveness and the addition of new areas, vary with the chosen difficulty. Each story mission focuses on players seeking out an object in the level, and then bringing it back to an exit portal. Completing the story mode on the easiest difficulty unlocks "Challenge Mode", which provide certain goals on a pre-set map within the time limit.

The game's multiplayer mode, known as "Arcade", allows for up to four players and ten computer-controlled bots to compete individually, or in up to four different teams in certain modes. There are six multiplayer modes and aspects of each mode — such as the weapons and levels available, the winning condition, and managing characters — can be customized to match player preference.

A level editor in TimeSplitters, referred to as "Map Maker", allows the player to create their own level from a selection of various pre-made tiles. Light settings of the tiles can be edited individually and items can be added to the map. The map can be given any one of five themes; these themes change the interior shape of the tiles and their appearance. The player can also play and test their levels in any certain multiplayer modes, as well as saving them to their memory card.

== Premise ==
TimeSplitters takes place across a series of nine fictional locations across a variety of time periods between 1935 and 2035. The story focuses on the efforts of 18 characters, as they conduct their own personal agenda in their respective time period, seeking to defeat a foe of theirs and recover something important. During the course of this effort, the group come across an alien mutant race called the TimeSplitters, who seek to prevent this, and ultimately impede the characters where possible.

== Development and release ==
In February 1999, several members of the GoldenEye 007 and Perfect Dark development team — including David Doak, Steve Ellis, Karl Hilton and Graeme Norgate — left Rare to form their own company based in Nottingham, England called Free Radical Design. TimeSplitters was the first project for Free Radical Design team, and the development was carried out by eighteen people. Graeme Norgate composed the music for TimeSplitters. The game was developed in 16 months with a budget of £500,000

David Doak, the designer of TimeSplitters, said that the team focused on "action-based gameplay, but there are many other elements" and stated that the game would be "using both analog controls on the DualShock 2 and all of the controls will be fully customizable." The team additionally included a "sign-on" system, which saves individual player profile and preferences stored on the memory card. Because of the PlayStation 2's hardware limitations, Steve Ellis explained that "[g]etting a four-way split screen working at a good frame rate is a problem on any console, and the PS2 is no exception". The team did not use anti-aliasing for TimeSplitters as it would reduce the frame rate drastically.

TimeSplitters was released in North America on 23 October 2000 and in Europe on 24 November 2000, as a launch game for the PlayStation 2. As part of the Platinum Range, it was re-released on 8 March 2002.

== Reception ==
Reception

Aggregate score
Aggregator	Score
Metacritic	81/100

Review scores
Publication	Score
AllGame	3.5/5
Edge	8/10
Eurogamer	9/10
Game Informer	9.5/10
GameFan	88%
GamePro	5/5
GameRevolution	C
GameSpot	8.4/10
GameSpy	90%
IGN	8.6/10
Next Generation	4/5
Official U.S. PlayStation Magazine	5/5

Garrett Kenyon reviewed the PlayStation 2 version of the game for Next Generation, rating it four stars out of five, and stated that "True fans of the FPS genre will enjoy TimeSplitters for its straightforward presentation and simple trigger-pulling appeal." It was a runner-up for GameSpot's annual "Best Shooting Game" award among console games, which went to Perfect Dark.

TimeSplitters received generally favourable reviews according to the review aggregation website Metacritic. Edge praised the game's fluid and action-packed multiplayer mode, comparing it favourably to the Quake series, and credited the artificial intelligence of enemies for being relentless, especially during multiplayer matches.

According to PC Data, TimeSplitters sold 120,000 units in 2000.
