= End of an Error =

Studio album by DeathBoy
- Released: February 2007
- Recorded: 2005 to 2007
- Genre: Industrial, Breakbeat
- Length: 51:30
- Label: Line Out Records
- Producer: Scott Lamb, John Fryer, Rico

DeathBoy chronology
Music to Crash Cars To (2003)	End of an Error (2007)

Professional ratings
Review scores
Source	Rating
Mick Mercer	(favourable)

End of an Error is the second studio album released by DeathBoy. A successor to DeathBoy's debut release Music to Crash Cars To, End of an Error was a much more polished release. The second track in the album, Black Morning, was used in the Xbox 360 game Project Gotham Racing 3.

== Track listing ==
1. Amphetamine Zoo
2. Black Morning
3. Money and Confidence
4. Slip
5. Smile You Fuckers
6. Lullaby
7. Cheap Shot
8. Playing Grownup
9. Something
10. Angel on my Shoulder
11. Caustic
