= Touché: The Adventures of the Fifth Musketeer =

1995 video game

- Developer: Clipper Software
- Publishers: CentreGold; U.S. Gold
- Platforms: MS-DOS, Windows 95
- Release: 1995
- Genre: Graphic adventure
- Mode: Single-player

Touché: The Adventures of the Fifth Musketeer is a point-and-click adventure game developed by Clipper Software for MS-DOS. It takes place in 1562, during the French Wars of Religion, when France was being polarized between the Catholics and Huguenots and expected an assault from the English. The protagonist is Geoffroi Le Brun who is recruited to a company of musketeers (the historical Musketeers of the Guard were not created until 1622) in Rouen. The adventure continues through France including St. Quentin, Le Mans, Amiens, and Le Havre.

== Gameplay ==
Touché is a context-based point-and-click adventure game. The player character moves around by clicking on the selected spot on the landscape. Certain objects have their own set of commands, each causing Geoffroi to behave accordingly. Most puzzles require the combination of an acquired item with an object in the environment. After the solving of certain puzzles, it can unlock new locations, whereby the player can use the travel map to see what new areas they may be able to go to.

== Plot ==
As Geoffroi arrives to Rouen, he witnesses the murder of William de Peuple, Compte d'Itee, whose will and testament was stolen. He promises to the dying Compte to find his stolen will and deliver it to Paris, bequeathing his castle to the Chancellor. Early on he meets Henri, a crook who stood nearby posing as a blind beggar during the murder, and is forced to hire him as his manservant. He follows the band who murdered the Compte in a tavern but he is hit, allowing them to escape. During his stay there he falls in love with Juliette, a selfish and promiscuous maiden who is courted by D'Artagnan.

Geoffroi learns that a suspicious man who paid with "Spanish coins" left for St. Quentin. He goes there, and in the Cathedral of "St. Greavsie" he meets Louis, the "Cardinal of Guise"; he informs him that his brother, Francis, the Duke of Guise is preparing to lead the French forces against an English assault and de Peuple's castle is to defend the way from Le Havre. While there, he also meets a poet named Alexandre Dumas who composes a love poem for Juliette. On his way, Geoffroi learns that the murderer never reached St. Quentin as he suffered from food poisoning and stopped in the closest monastery in Amiens. Geoffroi attempts to arrest him but the murderer escapes, leaving behind the will, which Geoffroi recovers. But on his way back to Rouen, he is robbed by a highwayman. Geoffroi traces the criminal to Le Mans, and a florist shop housing an underground network of illegal gambling and prostitution; it ends up that the highwayman lost the will to a card game, and it was in turn stolen by gypsy bandits. Dressed as the highwayman, Geoffroi is captured by the gypsies but manages to trade for the will.

In Paris, Geoffroi finds Le Louvre which houses the office of the Chancellor of France; seeing that he is acquainted with Juliette's sister, he seeks her help to make an appointment with him and deliver the will. But then, Cardinal Louis arrives and claims the will, revealing that he is interested in the magic books in de Peuple's castle. Geoffroi then goes to join with his regiment in Le Havre, trying to hold the English forces; he meets a contact who provides them with maps of the enemy lines. Geoffroi returns to the Rouen and the Cathedral and witnesses the Cardinal attempting to start a magick ceremony involving the remains of Charles V of France. Geoffroi switches the lids of the tombs of Charles V and Richard I of England, and when the Cardinal returns, he recovers the remains of Richard. Later Geoffroi meets an inventor, "Michelangelo da Vinci" who claims he is the nephew of Leonardo; with Geoffroi's help, he completes a steam boat, with which he sails the Seine and arrives to the castle of de Peuple.

Geoffroi finds the Duke of Guise holding a feast and Juliette forcing to serve the drinks. With her help, they poison the participants, causing them to leave for the restroom. Geoffroi finds a secret passage and confronts the Cardinal who attempts to create an undead army to save France and then rule it. The ritual fails as he uses the remains of the wrong King. Geoffroi releases the hypnotized Juliette and Henri, and force the Cardinal and his men to jump into the Seine.

De Peuple's will mentions a lost son who has a strawberry birthmark. Geoffroi, an orphan, believes that he is the heir, but Henri reveals he has the birthmark on the correct spot, inheriting the castle and Juliette staying with him. The game ends with Henri and Julliette bragging about their riches, with an annoyed Geoffroi lamenting his misfortune.

== Development ==
Touché was developed in the "Touché" game engine. It is supported by the ScummVM virtual engine.

It was also released as a CD-ROM version with full voiceover.

== Reception ==
Reception

Review score
Publication	Score
Computer Game Review	84/77/80

German magazine High Score awarded the game a 100/100 comparing it with The Dig and Simon the Sorcerer. Quandary described it an "enjoyable adventure" comparing it to Monkey Island giving it 80/100.

Adventurearchiv praised its humor but criticized the lengthy, uninterruptible travel sequences, and the quality of some jokes and puzzles. Just Adventure praised the "terrific story worthy of Alexandre Dumas". These reviews gave a 76 and 75 score respectively.

Aventura y Cía said that the game could be called "Monkey Island 3", (Note: Released in 1995, Touché followed Monkey Island 2, but preceded the release of the actual Monkey Island 3 (1997).) because of the similarity to the Monkey Island games, remarking that it doesn't reach the quality of similar productions, giving a score of 60.

Reset gave the game a score of 50, criticizing the character creation and the soundtrack, calling the game outdated.

== See also ==
- The Three Musketeers, 1844 novel by Alexandre Dumas
- Igor: Objective Uikokahonia
