= Graeme Norgate =

British video game music composer

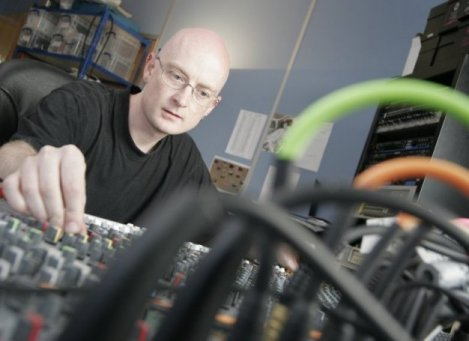
- Norgate developing music at Free Radical Design in 2006

Background information
- Genres: Electronica, techno, heavy metal, industrial, space music, space music, chill-out, liquid funk, acid jazz, progressive, ambient, deep house, trip hop, new age, dance-punk, drum and bass
- Occupations: Composer, musician
- Years active: 1994–present
- Website: graemenorgate.com

Graeme Norgate is a British video game music composer who has composed music for a variety of video games developed by Rare. His first project at Rare was writing music for the Game Boy game, Donkey Kong Land. He also contributed to the soundtracks of Blast Corps and GoldenEye 007. Norgate was later an employee of Free Radical Design, the company was eventually bought out by Crytek and renamed to Crytek UK; Norgate retained the position of audio director after the company's buyout. Norgate later moved to Dambuster Studios after Crytek closed down Crytek UK.

Originally working at a bank before joining Rare in 1994, Norgate worked on the music of such games as GoldenEye 007 and Blast Corps. A friend of fellow Rare composer Robin Beanland, the two worked on the original soundtrack to Killer Instinct in the 1990s. He also composed music for other Rareware games such as Diddy Kong Racing, Jet Force Gemini, and Perfect Dark.

Norgate played synthesizer and programmed drums for the bands 'FWNT' and 'The Catch' between 1991 and 1992. He also has remixing works under the alias of Virez; he has remixed several songs for bands such as Sigue Sigue Sputnik, Goteki, Code 64, Seize and Illumina.

== Video game soundtracks ==
Title	Year	Notes
Killer Instinct	1994	With Robin Beanland, also converted music for the SNES and Game Boy versions.
Donkey Kong Land	1995	With David Wise
Blast Corps	1997	
GoldenEye 007	1997	With Grant Kirkhope and Beanland
Diddy Kong Racing	1997	Sound effects
Jet Force Gemini	1999	With Beanland and Alistair Lindsay
Perfect Dark	2000	With Kirkhope and David Clynick
TimeSplitters	2000	
TimeSplitters 2	2002	
Second Sight	2004	With Christian Marcussen
TimeSplitters: Future Perfect	2005	With Christian Marcussen
Crysis	2007	Audio director
Haze	2008	With Christian Marcussen and Cris Velasco
Gangsta' Zombies	2010	
I Wanna Be the Boshy	2010	Uses music from Killer Instinct
Crysis 2	2011	Audio director
Twist Pilot	2012	
The Snowman and the Snowdog	2012	
Gangsta' Pets	2012	
AXRIA Retro World	2012	
Crysis 3	2013	Audio director
Ryse: Son of Rome	2013	Crytek Nottingham Developers
Killer Instinct	2013	Special thanks
Q.U.B.E.: Director's Cut	2014	Special thanks
Rare Replay	2015	Special thanks
Crack Attack	2015	
Polygoly	2015	
Homefront: The Revolution	2016	Audio director
Carnival Blast	2019	
Tamarin	2020	Ambient tracks and sound design.
Dead Island 2	2023	Audio director, additional voices
