= DeathBoy =

Musician Scott Lamb and his band

- Origin: London, England, United Kingdom
- Genre: Industrial
- Years active: 2002–present (some solo works by founder Scott Lamb dating as far back as 1996 have been released under the DeathBoy name retroactively)
- Labels: Line Out Records; Corporate Records
- Members: Scott Lamb; Adam Gelman; Phil Palmer; Lee Chaos
- Past members: Ben Urbina; Nathan Parton; Jason Knight
- Website: www.deathboy.co.uk

DeathBoy is the pseudonym of Midlands-born musician Scott Lamb, and also the name of his band.

== History ==
=== Scott Lamb ===
Lamb started making music at the age of thirteen, creating music in the breakbeat and rave genres using OctaMED on the Amiga. At school, he met Matthew Phillips (also known as "The Phil"), who became his long-term lyrical collaborator and friend.

In 1995, he went to Liverpool University, and began using the name DeathBoy. Beforehand he had been releasing tracks under the name Technohead, and wanted to avoid confusion with the newly popular gabber artist Technohead. After graduating in 1998, he spent six months working for a games company in Aldridge which went bust, before working at Blitz Games in Leamington Spa, where he met Phil Palmer, later to be his live drummer.

His online reputation spread in 2001 when he created the DeathKiddy Test, a Flash applet with one of his tracks, "Decimate", as a soundtrack.

=== The band ===
On moving to London early in 2001, Lamb started spending time on the London net.goth scene through contacts he'd made online, meeting Jason Knight and Adam Gelman. In 2002, he formed DeathBoy as a live project after rejecting several alternative names, including "DeathBoy and the Bomb Puppets". The original lineup was Lamb (vocals), Jason Knight (guitars), Adam Gelman (bass), Phil Palmer (drums) and housemate Ben Noz Urbina (guitars). Urbina left the band after three gigs to concentrate on his consulting career and compose music solo part-time under the name DJ Solution. Urbina was replaced by Nathan "Hexa-dB" Parton on keyboards. Parton left after a further three gigs, leaving a four-piece line-up that continued until October 2005, when the band recruited Lee Chaos of Wasp Factory Recordings as live keyboardist.

The band have supported such leading underground artists as Tricky, Sheep on Drugs, Icon of Coil, Rico (with special guest star Gary Numan), and Bella Morte. They have played Whitby Gothic Weekend (in 2003 and 2005), the Catalyst festival in Toronto (2003), Black Celebration 5 (2003) in London, as well as numerous smaller shows up and down the UK. Mick Mercer listed the band second place for his "Top 20 albums of the year" in 2003. The band has also been reviewed in Terrorizer and Meltdown magazines.

Deathboy signed to Line Out Records in 2005, and released their second commercial album, End of an Error, in 2006.

== Discography ==
=== Commercial releases ===
DeathBoy have two commercial albums:

- Music to Crash Cars To (2003),
- End of an Error (2006)

Their industrial music song "Black Morning" is part of the soundtrack of the Xbox 360 video game Project Gotham Racing 3.

=== Free releases ===
Many DeathBoy albums, EPs and collections are available for download free of charge from their website, as a part of Lamb's "release early and often" policy, mirroring an ethic of the open-source software movement. The releases include:

- BitScapes (2008–2011)
- CogRock (2008–2010)
- Covers (2005–2010)
- Unalternative (2003–2010)
- Remixes (2003–2010)
- Premixes (2003–2010)
- ToRights (2007–2008)
- Forwards (2006–2007)
- DeathBoy – LIVE (2004–2007)
- Digital Deviant (2005–2006)
- Ifyouunderstoodiwouldnthavetospeak (2004–2005)
- Sociopathic (2003)
- Boxesoftricksandtraps (2003)
- Self-Hatred for Fun and Profit (2002–2003)
- Riding the Biorhythms (2002)
- GodKiller (2001)
- Music to Crash Cars To (v1.0) (2000–2001)
- Invisible (2000)
- A Very Technical Boy (1999)
- Deftunes (1996–1998)

The potentially confusingly named free release Music to Crash Cars To (v1.0) is not the same as the 2003 commercial album, although they share many of the same tracks.

"Works-in-progress", completed parts of which are downloadable (as of April 2011):

- Eschatology (2010–2011 so far)
- BiPolar (2005–2008 so far)
- Highly Derivative (2003–2005 so far)
