= Free Radical Design =

British video game developer

Free Radical Design Ltd.
- Formerly: Crytek UK Limited (2009–2014)
- Company type: Subsidiary
- Industry: Video games
- Founded: April 1999; 27 years ago (original); May 2021; 5 years ago (revival)
- Founders: David Doak; Steve Ellis; Karl Hilton; Graeme Norgate
- Defunct: 3 February 2009; 17 years ago (original); 11 December 2023; 2 years ago (revival)
- Headquarters: Nottingham, England
- Key people: David Doak; Steve Ellis; Karl Hilton; Graeme Norgate
- Products: TimeSplitters
- Number of employees: 50+ (2022)
- Parent: Crytek (2009–2014); Deep Silver (2021–2023)
- Website: www.freeradicaldesign.co.uk

Free Radical Design Ltd. was a British video game developer based in Nottingham. Founded by David Doak, Steve Ellis, Karl Hilton and Graeme Norgate in Stoke-on-Trent in April 1999, it is best known for its TimeSplitters series of games.

After going into financial administration, it was announced on 3 February 2009 that the studio had been acquired by German video game developer Crytek and would be renamed Crytek UK. Crytek had a good relationship with the city of Nottingham due in part to its sponsorship of the Gamecity festival and its recruitment drives with Nottingham Trent University. In 2014, the studio was closed, with a majority of the staff transferred to the newly formed Dambuster Studios.

In May 2021, two of the original founders, Doak and Ellis, reformed Free Radical Design under Deep Silver to create a new entry in the TimeSplitters series. Two years later, the second iteration was shut down on 11 December 2023.

== History ==
Most of Free Radical Design's initial employees previously worked for the game developer Rare. While at Rare, they (David Doak, Steve Ellis, Karl Hilton, Graeme Norgate, Lee Ray and James Cunliffe) worked on the Nintendo 64 first-person shooters GoldenEye 007 and Perfect Dark. From late 1998 to early 1999, this team left Rare to form Free Radical Design, which was established in April 1999, its first release being TimeSplitters for the PlayStation 2 in 2000. It was known for its very fast-paced gameplay and its particular emphasis on multiplayer rather than story. TimeSplitters attracted attention at the time because of the former Rare employees' work on the critically acclaimed GoldenEye 007. Its sequel, first-person shooter TimeSplitters 2, released with critical acclaim in 2002.

Free Radical Design was working on Star Wars: Battlefront III from 2006 to 2008, but it was cancelled by their publishing partner when it was supposedly "99 percent" complete. The cancellation of this title, and the poorly received release of Haze, contributed to Free Radical Design going into bankruptcy. In late 2008, Free Radical Design was approached by Activision to work on a GoldenEye 007 remake. Although the studio rebuilt the Dam Level for the PlayStation 3 and Xbox 360, negotiations fell through, with the studio entering administration soon afterwards. The remake would release on those consoles without FRD's involvement in 2011 as an enhanced port of its original release on the Wii and Nintendo DS a year prior.

On 18 December 2008, it was reported that the studio had shut down, though it was later confirmed that the company had gone bankrupt, leaving only 40 of the original 185 staff still employed. On 3 February 2009, the Haze scriptwriter, Rob Yescombe, announced that Free Radical Design had been purchased by the German developer Crytek. In 2010, the company moved from Sandiacre to brand-new offices in the new central Nottingham Southreef development. The £50 million investment would then have allowed Crytek UK to "grow over the next few months".

=== Financial problems and closure ===
In June 2014, reports surfaced that Crytek had missed wage payments and withheld bonuses, that a number of employees had filed grievances and refused to report to work, and that at least 30 employees had left since 2011 alone due to a decreasing morale. After denying that there were problems, Crytek said on 25 July 2014 that it was in a "transitional phase" as it secured capital for future projects, with an emphasis on online gaming.

On 30 July 2014, Crytek announced that, due to an internal restructuring, it would sell the intellectual property of Homefront (the sequel for which, later restructured as the reboot Homefront: The Revolution, was in development at Crytek UK at the time) to Koch Media, parent company of video game publisher Deep Silver, and lay off much of the company's staff. Crytek left it unclear whether the company had been shut down entirely, however all staff were transferred to the new Dambuster Studios being established in Nottingham in accordance with British law, where they afterwards continued to work on Homefront: The Revolution.

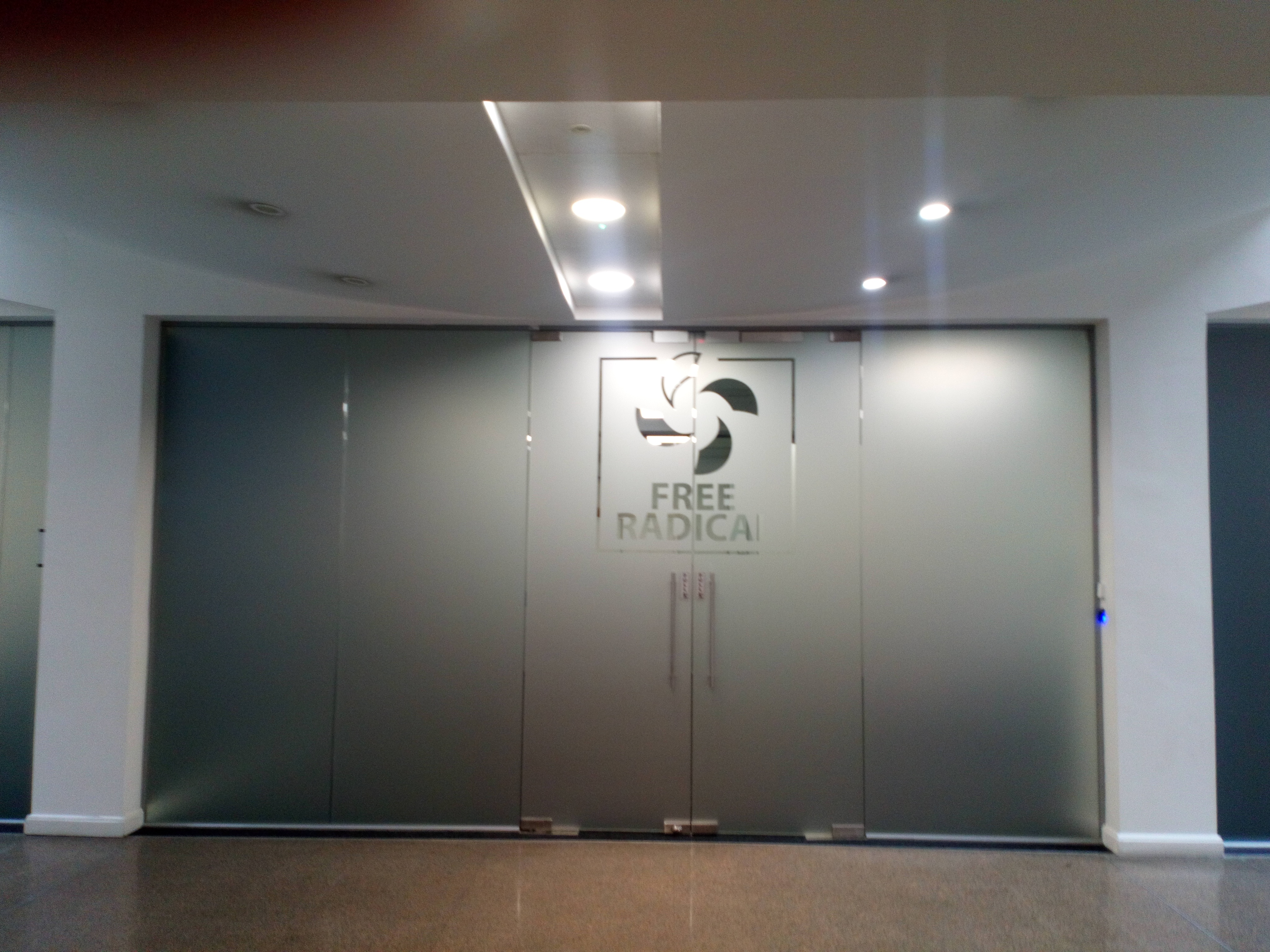
Free Radical Design in May 2023

=== Reformation and second closure ===
In May 2021, Embracer Group announced during its 2020–2021 full-year report that Free Radical Design would be reformed as a subsidiary of Deep Silver with the intent of bringing "the much-loved TimeSplitters IP back to life". Key original members of the original Free Radical Design were involved in the reformation including founders Steve Ellis and David Doak. Their studio was based in Nottingham.

In November 2023, VGC reported that the company was set to be closed down on 11 December by the Embracer Group, which had been restructuring its company and subsidiaries for the last six months, unless a third-party buyer was found. Developers confirmed the closure on 11 December.

== Games developed ==
=== As Free Radical Design (1999–2008) ===
Year	Game	Publisher(s)	Genre(s)	Platform(s)				
Year	Game	Publisher(s)	Genre(s)	GCN	Win	PS2	PS3	Xbox
2000	TimeSplitters	Eidos Interactive	First-person shooter	No	No	Yes	No	No
2002	TimeSplitters 2	Eidos Interactive	First-person shooter	Yes	No	Yes	No	Yes
2004	Second Sight	Codemasters	Action-adventure, stealth	Yes	Yes	Yes	No	Yes
2005	TimeSplitters: Future Perfect	Electronic Arts	First-person shooter	Yes	No	Yes	No	Yes
2008	Haze	Ubisoft	First-person shooter	No	No	No	Yes	No

=== As Crytek UK (2009–2014) ===
Year	Game	Publisher(s)	Genre(s)	Platform(s)		
Year	Game	Publisher(s)	Genre(s)	Win	PS3	X360
2011	Crysis 2	Electronic Arts	First-person shooter	Yes	Yes	Yes
2011	Crysis (port)	Electronic Arts	First-person shooter	No	Yes	Yes
2013	Crysis 3	Electronic Arts	First-person shooter	Yes	Yes	Yes
2014	Warface	Microsoft Studios	First-person shooter	No	No	Yes

== Cancelled games ==
- Star Wars: Battlefront III
- TimeSplitters 4
- Untitled TimeSplitters game
