= TimeSplitters: Future Perfect =

2005 video game

- Developer: Free Radical Design
- Publisher: Electronic Arts (Note: Published under the label EA Games.)
- Directors: Stephen Ellis; David Doak
- Programmers: Hasit Zala; Joe Moulding
- Artist: Tristan Reidford
- Writers: Andrew Lawson, James Cunliffe
- Composers: Graeme Norgate; Christian Marcussen
- Series: TimeSplitters
- Platforms: GameCube; PlayStation 2; Xbox
- Release: GameCube, PlayStation 2, Xbox: NA: 22 March 2005; EU: 24 March 2005
- Genre: First-person shooter
- Modes: Single-player, multiplayer

TimeSplitters: Future Perfect is a 2005 first-person shooter video game developed by Free Radical Design and published by Electronic Arts for the GameCube, PlayStation 2, and Xbox.

TimeSplitters: Future Perfect is the third and final game in the TimeSplitters series, following TimeSplitters (2000) and TimeSplitters 2 (2002). The game features a single-player mode consisting of levels where the player assumes the role of Sergeant Cortez, a time-traveling marine from the 25th century, as he attempts to go to the past to save the future. The game also includes a range of multiplayer options, including cooperative gameplay during story mode. Online play was included in both the PlayStation 2 and Xbox versions, which has since been disabled.

Future Perfect, along with the other games in the trilogy, were re-released for PlayStation 4 and PlayStation 5 as a PS2 Classic in 2024, with trophy support, a rewind feature and improved loading times.

== Gameplay ==
The Arcade and Challenge modes both allow the player to unlock new characters, weapons, and new locations for Arcade (excluding league) that the player can then use in the game's mapmaker feature. The player can complete various missions and league challenges to receive awards, new characters and medals. Once the player completes a mission the game automatically saves progress. In challenges and Arcade Leagues the player earns awards. Bronze, silver, gold, and platinum medals can be acquired.

=== Mapmaker ===
After the original TimeSplitters, Free Radical Design decided to include a level creator in the TimeSplitters series. It includes tiles, character spawns, items for specific game-modes (such as a briefcase in "capture the bag" game mode) as well as the option to change the lighting and also add pre-determined "bot sets", that is a group of up to ten characters to regularly appear on the map. The same goes for weapon sets.

This form of Mapmaker limits the player to a selected number of tiles. It also allows basic features such as the addition of gun turrets, weaponry spawns and health and armor locations. It also features numerous backdrop items which vary on the maps "tile-sets", such as a sarcophagus in the "Ancient Egyptian" tile-set, and a remote control robotic cat, named Strudel.

The advanced version allows players to create a complex map as long as space is free. It contains all the features of beginner mode, as well as extra tile shapes, and backdrop features. it also features complex story mode features allowing users to create detailed and in-depth story maps of their own creation.

== Plot ==
Sgt. Cortez and The General, from the story mode of TimeSplitters: Future Perfect

The game begins in 2401 when the protagonist, Sergeant Cortez, a space marine in a futuristic military force, is leaving the space station that he destroyed at the end of TimeSplitters 2. His ship crash-lands on the future Earth, and two fellow marines greet him. Sergeant Cortez follows his squad of marines through the valley and battles unknown masked figures and TimeSplitters. After arriving at HQ, Cortez is tasked with following signatures in the past that were created by time travel and thought to be caused by the TimeSplitters. He goes on a mission to go back in time to find a way to stop the TimeSplitters race from being created, with the help of Anya, The General's Chief Science Officer.

Using his Temporal Uplink, a device connected to the Time Machine, both of which Anya has invented, Cortez travels to the small Scottish island of Urnsay in the year 1924. There, he meets a man named Captain Ash, who seeks Cortez's help. After raiding a castle with Captain Ash, Cortez confronts an unknown man with a high concentration of Time Crystals, who then escapes with his own time machine. Cortez then travels to 1969 to stop Khallos (whom Cortez thinks is the time traveler) with the help of hippie secret agent Harry Tipper, to rescue his girlfriend, Kitten Celeste. After defeating Khallos, Anya reveals to Cortez through the walkie-talkie on his Temporal Uplink that a mansion in Connecticut had burned down in the 1990s, leaving behind residue of Time Crystal energy.

In 1994, he is greeted by a teenager named Jo-Beth Casey, who was tasked with photographing the mansion's zombies by her friends. She tells Cortez that the house is haunted, and the two battle zombies and ghosts inside the abandoned mansion. After discovering that the creator of the TimeSplitters is a mad scientist named Dr. Jacob Crow, Cortez embarks on a new mission to foil the scientist's plans by destroying his labs throughout all of the time periods that Crow had visited. After an abrupt farewell to Casey, Cortez travels to 2052, where Crow has advanced his gene-splitting experiments. Cortez meets Amy Chen, a highly trained spy sent to defeat Crow as well. They both fight through his lab facility to find Crow, who escapes again.

Cortez travels to the year 2243, where machines now rule the planet, and have waged war on humans and each other. Cortez hacks into one of the machines, identified as R-110, and allies with him. He also teams up with a small group of cyborg rebels fighting against the machines to make his way to Crow's now-extremely large and powerful lab, filled with thousands of TimeSplitter embryos. Cortez manages to destroy what he can of the lab, but is not strong enough to defeat Crow, who himself has combined with the TimeSplitter race and a war machine. Anya sends Cortez and R-110 back to 1924 to stop Crow before he can further his lab experiments in the first place.

Now in 1924 again, he and R-110 make their way to Crow. Cortez finds Dr. Crow fused with a large bipedal robot. Crow destroys Cortez's ally R-110, leaving him and Cortez face to face. Knowing he can't defeat the scientist alone, Anya sends Cortez back in time a few minutes to when he first arrived in hopes of being able to double-team Crow with two Cortezes (and R-110, who was never destroyed as a result of the time loop).

After Crow is defeated, Cortez puts a raw crystal into a device that causes a chain reaction that destroys the entire compound. Anya warps Cortez and R-110 back to HQ, leaving Crow and the Time Crystals to be destroyed. Cortez, Anya, and The General approach the window and observe the barren desert land restored to its former form; a lush, green forest filled with life. However, the Temporal Uplink on Cortez's wrist, the large time machine in the room, and R-110 all disappear due to the time paradox.

== Development ==
The game was announced in May 2004. It was developed by a team of about 40 people.

The original Xbox version of TimeSplitters: Future Perfect was made backwards compatible on Xbox One and Xbox Series X/S on November 15, 2021.

== Reception ==
Reception

Aggregate score
Aggregator	Score		
Aggregator	GameCube	PS2	Xbox
Metacritic	82/100	84/100	83/100

Review scores
Publication	Score		
Publication	GameCube	PS2	Xbox
Edge	N/A	N/A	8/10
Electronic Gaming Monthly	8.17/10	8.17/10	8.17/10
Eurogamer	N/A	N/A	8/10
Game Informer	9/10	9/10	9/10
GamePro	3.5/5	4/5	4/5
GameRevolution	B−	B	B
GameSpot	7.6/10	8.1/10	8.1/10
GameSpy	4/5	4/5	4/5
GameTrailers	8.5/10	8.5/10	8.5/10
GameZone	8.4/10	8.8/10	8.7/10
IGN	8.8/10	8.9/10	9/10
Nintendo Power	4.4/5	N/A	N/A
Official U.S. PlayStation Magazine	N/A	5/5	N/A
Official Xbox Magazine (US)	N/A	N/A	7.9/10
Cube	9/10	N/A	N/A
The Sydney Morning Herald	N/A	4/5	N/A
The Times	4/5	4/5	4/5

TimeSplitters: Future Perfect received "generally favorable" reviews from critics, according to review aggregator website Metacritic. It won an "IGN Best of 2005" award for "Best First-Person Shooter"

== Canceled sequel ==
TimeSplitters 4 was in development for almost a year, but was delayed after Free Radical went into administration and was subsequently bought out by Crytek. On 17 August 2009, the project had been declared as on hold. In an interview, Crytek UK claimed that they would continue the project once there was a high industry demand for such a game.

On 19 May 2021, Deep Silver announced that a new TimeSplitters game was to be developed by a previously disbanded Free Radical Design. In December 2023, Free Radical Design was closed down amidst a wide scale company restructuring from Embracer Group.
