= Randal's Monday =

2014 video game

- Developer: Nexus Game Studio
- Publisher: Daedalic Entertainment
- Engine: Unity
- Platforms: Windows, macOS, Android, iOS & PS4
- Release: November 12, 2014
- Genre: Adventure

Randal's Monday is a dark-comedy adventure game by Spanish indie developer Nexus Game Studio, released in 2014.

== Gameplay ==
The game relies on a series of 'guesswork' puzzles. The game contains references to media such as Portal, The Twilight Zone, The Shawshank Redemption, Back to the Future, Super Ghouls 'n Ghosts, Clerks, The Office, Blade Runner, Terminator and Fraggle Rock. The game has different-colored lines of dialogue and emphasis on humor, like classic LucasArts games out of SCUMM.

== Plot ==
The plot centers around a character named Randal, a sociopath and kleptomaniac, who becomes stuck in a Groundhog Day loop. The dark humor has been compared to Hector: Badge of Carnage.

== Development ==
Randal's Monday was the first video game of Nexus Game Studio.

Jeff Anderson, who played Randal, described the game as an homage to early 2D LucasArts titles. While this game contains a character named Randal, it bears no relation to the character from the View Askewniverse film franchise, also named Randal and played by Anderson. In Clerks, Anderson's character was named Randal Graves, while in Randal's Monday, his character is named Randal Hicks, possibly a reference to another Clerks character, Dante Hicks (Brian O'Halloran).

== Reception ==
Reception

Aggregate scores
Aggregator	Score
Metacritic	PC: 57/100
OpenCritic	57/100; 10% Critics Recommend

PC Gamer wrote "Randal's Monday gets it painfully wrong, mistaking convoluted and crazy for funny and logical to the point of being tedious and infuriating to play even with an in-game walk-through for when you've had enough." IGN said "Randal’s Monday has a clever premise that deserves better treatment than it does in this crude, baffling adventure". GameSpot concluded "Randal's Monday is blind hero worship that ignores decades of design theory and leaves an unpleasant aftertaste thanks to its thoroughly unlikable, homogeneous cast."

In 2017, HobbyConsolas named Randal's Monday one of the greatest Spanish games ever released.

== See also ==
- Dead Synchronicity—Spanish-made adventure from the same time
