= TimeSplitters 2 =

2002 video game

- Developer: Free Radical Design
- Publisher: Eidos Interactive
- Directors: Stephen Ellis; David Doak
- Producers: Stephen Ellis; David Doak
- Programmer: Hasit Zala
- Artist: Karl Hilton
- Composer: Graeme Norgate
- Series: TimeSplitters
- Platforms: PlayStation 2; Xbox; GameCube
- Release: 8 October 2002: PlayStation 2, Xbox; NA: 8 October 2002; EU: 18 October 2002; AU: 28 October 2002 (PS2); AU: 4 November 2002 (Xbox) GameCube; NA: 15 October 2002; EU: 1 November 2002; AU: 4 November 2002
- Genre: First-person shooter
- Modes: Single-player, multiplayer

TimeSplitters 2 is a first-person shooter video game, developed by Free Radical Design, published by Eidos Interactive, and released in October 2002 for PlayStation 2, Xbox and GameCube. The game's story focuses on the efforts of a space marine who seeks to recover powerful time crystals from a race of alien mutants called TimeSplitters, which leads them to taking on the form of an individual dealing with their own problems across different time periods between the 19th and 25th century. The developers focused on expanding the story element following 2000's TimeSplitters, and features influences from various film genres, including horror, action and science fiction.

Alongside the story mode, which can be played solo or co-operatively, players can also engage in multiplayer modes and create their own maps. The game received generally favorable reviews from critics, who praised its improvements on its predecessor as well as its multiplayer gameplay and graphics, though criticised its story and lack of online gameplay. TimeSplitters 2 was later followed by a sequel, TimeSplitters: Future Perfect, in 2005.

TimeSplitters 2, along with the other games in the trilogy, were re-released on the PlayStation 4 and PlayStation 5 as a PS2 Classic in 2024, with trophy support, a rewind feature and improved loading times.

== Gameplay ==
TimeSplitters 2 is a first-person shooter that requires players to kill enemies and complete objectives using a variety of weapons and tactics in different predefined scenarios. Armour and health bars on the sides of the screen lower when the player is shot, which can be increased by walking over body armor and first aid kits.

The weapons of TimeSplitters 2 include handguns, rifles, submachine guns, shotguns, rocket launchers, a grenade launcher, various explosives, a crossbow, a flamethrower, a fire extinguisher and a brick. They are of many different time periods, from the historical to the futuristic. Some weapons have an alternate fire which activates a feature such as launching a grenade or detonating a remote mine. It is possible to dual wield some weapons.

=== Story mode ===
The main story mode of TimeSplitters 2 is divided into ten levels. Each level is in a different time period and contains a series of objectives that must be completed. Some objectives are present at the start of the level, while others are added during play. A few levels have secondary objectives, which are not required to complete unless on the normal or hard difficulty setting. Each level includes a single checkpoint in the middle where the player can restart if they die or fail to complete an objective (with the exception of the last level on any difficulty and the fourth level on easy). For each level, the player must choose from three difficulty levels. These difficulty levels not only change the strength of the enemies, but also increase the length of the level by adding additional objectives; for instance, in both easy and normal levels, there are optional secondary objectives, whereas in the hard levels, all secondary objectives are now primary and must be completed. At the end of every level, a time crystal must be recovered. After it is picked up, a time portal will appear which must be entered in order to complete the level. However, this is sometimes made more difficult by TimeSplitters that teleport to the player's location. In secret places of certain levels, there are cartridges of old school arcade games such as Snake, that can be picked up and played on the player's Temporal Uplink, the device that normally shows the map of the current level.

The game's story mode can be played alone or cooperatively with another player. When playing co-op, in order to balance the game, the two players' health amounts are lowered.

Along with the story mode, there are two additional single-player modes: an Arcade mode and a Challenge mode where a player is given a scenario and must complete it within certain requirements. The objective ranges from collecting bananas to shooting heads off zombies. After the objective is completed, the game will end, and a medal will be awarded depending on the number of points obtained. Certain medals allow the player to play as new characters in multiplayer or use cheats. Cheats can be turned on in the options menu to activate features such as unlimited ammunition or the ability to shoot paintballs. Free Radical's website implies that there are also controller-activated cheats that have never been released. They say they like to keep things "as impossible as possible."

=== Multiplayer ===
Screenshot of the Chicago level

Arcade mode is the main multiplayer section of TimeSplitters 2. It can normally be played with up to four players with each player using a division of the television's screen. However, with a System Link, up to sixteen players can participate. System link was not included with the GameCube version. When a player is killed, they are respawned at a random location on the map with full health. Weapons, armour, and other items that enhance players' abilities are placed in several preset positions scattered about the map. The objective of the game depends on the mode selected. Four are available at the start: Deathmatch, Team Deathmatch, Capture the Bag (a version of capture the flag) and BagTag (where a player must survive while in possession of the bag for the longest period of time). There are sixteen game modes in total, But twelve are unavailable until the player beats certain levels of the game.

Several aspects of multiplayer can be customised, such as the weapons, the number of points needed to win, the number of minutes until the end of the game, as well as the music that plays along with the level. There is also a variety of different characters the player can choose to play as, each with their own individual statistics. Some characters are from the Story mode, while there are other more humorous ones such as a dinosaur and an Elvis impersonator. Up to ten computer-controlled bots can be used. Their appearance, difficulty, and team can be customised. The bots can do some acrobatic moves that the player cannot do such as rolls and somersaults.

At the end of each match, the results of the game are shown. This includes the number of points each player or team scored, the weapon the player used most often, as well as awards the player earned. There are nearly 60 awards present in TimeSplitters 2. Players are given them based on what they did in the match. Awards are recorded in each player's profile which also keeps track of a variety of other statistics.

There is also an Arcade League mode in which one player is placed in an Arcade match with pre-set bots and weapons. There are three difficulty levels of Arcade League: Amateur, Honorary, and Elite. Players must beat them in consecutive order. After a player beats an Arcade League level, a medal is awarded.

A MapMaker is also available that can create playable levels. Levels for Story mode can be made as well as levels for Arcade mode. Created Story levels, however, cannot be played co-operatively. Maps are created by selecting and placing different pre-made tiles and rooms onto a grid. Spawn points, weapons, bags, armour, and objectives can then be placed anywhere on the level. There is a bar in the left side of the screen, representing memory, that lowers each time a tile or item is placed. When the bar depletes completely, nothing else can be placed onto the map. However, items can be deleted to increase memory. A theme can be chosen for each map such as Victorian, Industrial, Alien, and Virtual, which changes how the rooms appear.

Only LAN networks are supported, but online play is possible with the use of PCs and third-party networking software.

== Plot ==
In 2401, humanity is in the midst of a war against the TimeSplitters, a sadistic alien race intent on bringing about the destruction of mankind. With the war going against them, the surviving humans of Earth's space marine army discover that the TimeSplitters are in possession of special objects called Time Crystals - green crystals that can provide power for time travel, allowing anyone to travel through time to any point in history. Discovering their enemy is attempting to use the Time Crystals to change the course of human history, thus bringing Earth to ruins, space marines Sergeant Cortez and Corporal Hart are sent to a space station overrun by TimeSplitters to retrieve the crystals.

However, the pair's arrival forces the TimeSplitters to remove the crystals and scatter them across various moments in human history through a time portal, with the pair arriving just as the last crystal is removed. Sealing themselves into the portal's chamber, Hart decides to stay behind and operate the device, while Cortez uses it to track down the crystals. Upon arriving in the first time period, Siberia in 1990, Cortez finds himself taking on the form of a female spy who was sent to investigate unusual activity in the area (in a similar manner to the TV series Quantum Leap). Undeterred, Cortez attempts to complete each person's agenda in their respective time period, all while tracking down the crystals that have influenced events in that point of history – ranging from Notre Dame in 1896, an Aztec temple in 1920, to a major conflict with robots in 2312.

Eventually, Cortez recovers the crystals and returns to 2401 to rendezvous with Hart. But by this time, the TimeSplitters regain access to the portal device and attack the pair, killing Hart in the process. Cortez, left with little time to react, sets the space station to self-destruct, and escapes with the crystals to bring back to Earth, moments before the station is destroyed.

== Development ==
In February 1999, 15 months before the release of Perfect Dark, several members of Rare that were part of the GoldenEye 007 development team, including Steve Ellis, Karl Hilton, Graeme Norgate, and David Doak, left to form their own company called Free Radical Design. After they developed the first TimeSplitters, TimeSplitters 2 went into development, trying to create a more fulfilling story mode alongside the Arcade and MapMaker modes. The game was developed over a 23-month period, with around half of that time devoted to creating the opening level.

It was also one of the first multi-platform games to be re-released on both the PlayStation 2 Greatest Hits and Xbox Classics labels.

The location of the health bar and other gameplay features are reminiscent of GoldenEye 007 and Perfect Dark. Some gameplay present in TimeSplitters 2 is also very similar to GoldenEye 007; both games contain a similar aiming system and both lack the ability to jump.

=== Releases ===
There are a few minor differences between the console versions of TimeSplitters 2. For example, the PlayStation 2 version has a smaller playing field for minigames such as Anaconda. This consequently makes high scores on the PlayStation 2 version lower than the Xbox and GameCube versions which both have bigger playing fields for the minigames.

There are four different versions of cover art for the North American release of the game. Some of the versions had a unique tag line for the GameCube and Xbox ports. The GameCube version displayed the quote "Heir apparent to GoldenEye", by Electronic Gaming Monthly. The Xbox version said, "First Halo, now this". Other versions include the Player's Choice edition and the original release without the quotes.

Other release changes include removal of the map editor function and the renaming to Time Splitter: Invaders of the History on the Japanese release of the PlayStation 2 version. In addition, Europe, France, Japan, South Korea, and the United States each have different box art.

In PSM3, Doak expressed interest in remaking TimeSplitters 2 with HD visuals and online multiplayer.

In an October 2012 interview, Free Radical co-founder Steve Ellis said, "We had a "HD" downloadable version of TimeSplitters 2 in development at Free Radical in 2008. I don't know what happened to that but yes, I'd love to see it released at some point. Maybe it could be the catalyst that is required in order to raise enough interest in TimeSplitters 4 that a publisher might want to fund it."

Homefront: The Revolution, a game developed by Dambuster Studios (the corporate successor to Free Radical Design in accordance with British business transfer law due to the closure of Crytek UK), contains an easter egg featuring two playable levels from the game, accessible via an arcade cabinet located in one of the main game's locations. One of Homefront's programmers, Matt Phillips, revealed in 2021 that he had placed the whole of Timesplitters 2 at a 4K resolution as an Easter egg from one specific arcade cabinet, but had lost the code to trigger it. Shortly after announcing this on social media, one of the people that Phillips had shared the code with was able to provide it, proving the existence of the game.

The original Xbox version of TimeSplitters 2 was made backwards compatible on Xbox One and Xbox Series X/S on November 15, 2021.

== Reception ==
Reception

Aggregate score
| Aggregator | Score | | |
| Aggregator | GameCube | PS2 | Xbox |
|---|---|---|---|
| Metacritic | 88/100 | 90/100 | 88/100 |

Review scores
| Publication | Score | | |
| Publication | GameCube | PS2 | Xbox |
|---|---|---|---|
| AllGame | 4.5/5 | N/A | 4.5/5 |
| Edge | N/A | 9/10 | N/A |
| Electronic Gaming Monthly | 7/10 | 8.33/10 | 8/10 |
| Eurogamer | 9/10 | 9/10 | 9/10 |
| Famitsu | N/A | 30/40 | N/A |
| Game Informer | 8.5/10 | 8.25/10 | 8.5/10 |
| GamePro | 4.5/5 | 5/5 | 5/5 |
| GameSpot | 8.7/10 | 8.7/10 | 8.7/10 |
| GameSpy | 4.5/5 | 4.5/5 | 4/5 |
| GameZone | N/A | 9.5/10 | N/A |
| IGN | 9.1/10 | 9.1/10 | 9.1/10 |
| Nintendo Power | 4.7/5 | N/A | N/A |
| Official U.S. PlayStation Magazine | N/A | 5/5 | N/A |
| Official Xbox Magazine (US) | N/A | N/A | 9/10 |
| Entertainment Weekly | B− | B− | B− |

The PlayStation 2 version of TimeSplitters 2 received "universal acclaim", while the GameCube and Xbox versions received "generally favorable reviews", according to the review aggregation website Metacritic. It won GameSpot's annual "Best Shooter on GameCube" award, and was nominated for "Best Shooter on Xbox", which went to MechAssault.

In comparison to the first game in the series, GamePro called "TimeSplitters 2 [...] everything the original game was and more" and "outdoes most other PS2 shooters in the process". GameSpot said that the game "may very well be the best split-screen multiplayer-focused first-person shooter ever created." The publication later named it the best GameCube game of October 2002. IGN concluded that the game was "clearly the best multiplayer first-person shooter on the PlayStation 2", but commented that it was not story-driven and little empathy was felt for the characters. GameSpy criticized the absence of online play, but complimented the game's "great deathmatching action" and the game's high frame rate. They also said the game is "everything you could possibly want in a sequel." Official U.S. PlayStation Magazine praised it as "easily one of the best first-person shooters out there—on any system", but called its lack of online play "criminal."

During the 6th Annual Interactive Achievement Awards, the Academy of Interactive Arts & Sciences nominated TimeSplitters 2 for "Console First-Person Action Game of the Year".

The game has also been compared to GoldenEye 007 because of its many similar game elements, shared developers and references to that game, such as both games beginning on a Siberian dam.

== Legacy ==
The game features in the film Shaun of the Dead being played by the main characters Shaun and Ed.

The game is also playable within Homefront: The Revolution as an arcade machine within the Restricted Zone.
