= David Doak =

Northern Irish video game designer born on 20 July 1967

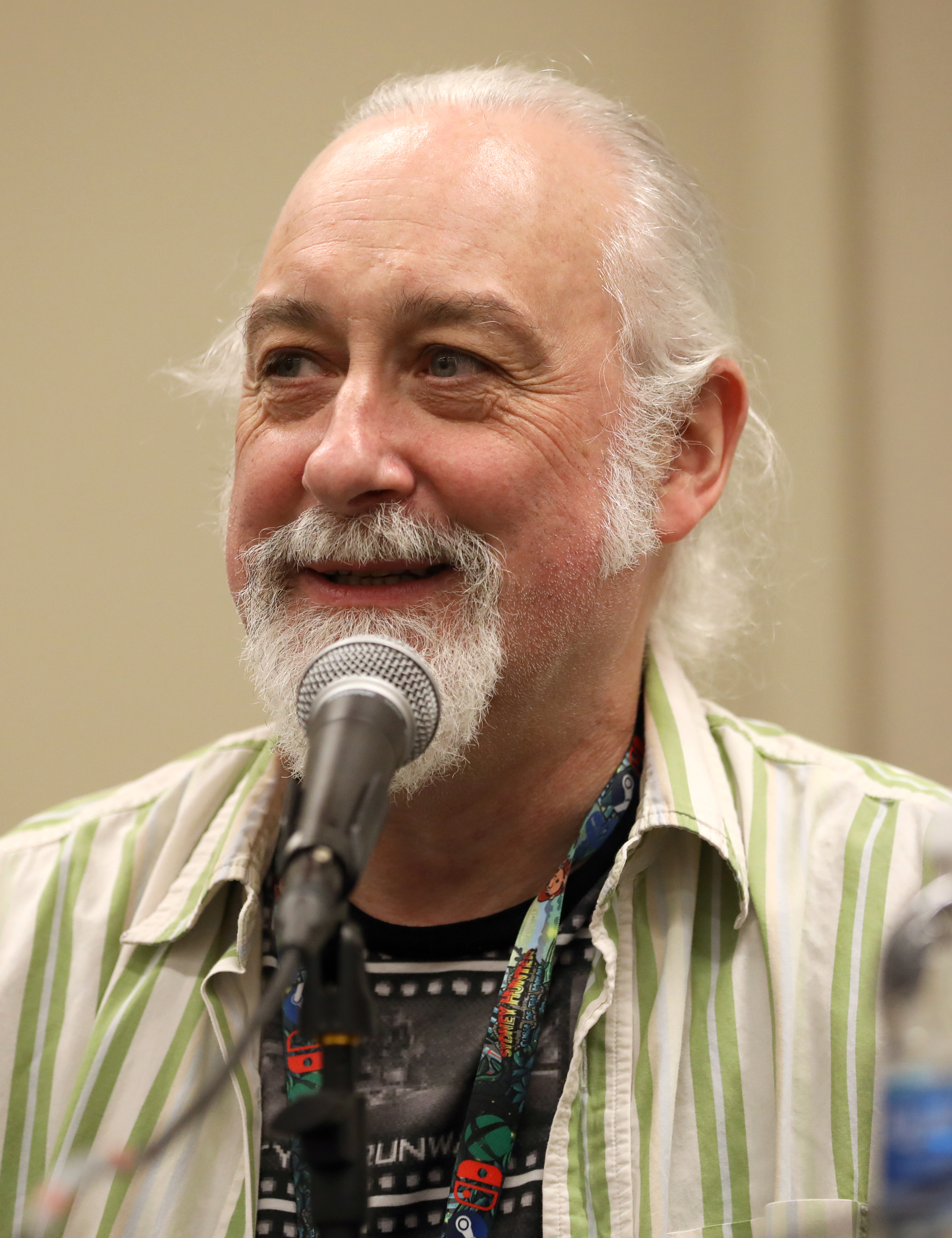
Doak in 2024

David Doak (/ˈdoʊk/ DOHK) is a Northern Irish video game designer.

== Biography ==
Originally from Belfast, he later moved to England, where he studied at Oxford University on biochemistry specialty and worked as a research scientist.

Doak began his video game career working with Rare where he provided network support for Donkey Kong Country 3: Dixie Kong's Double Trouble! and helped develop the critically acclaimed GoldenEye 007 and Perfect Dark for the Nintendo 64. His facial likeness and name were used for a non-player character in GoldenEye 007, a scientist named Dr. Doak. Several of the guards also bear his likeness.

Doak and video game composer Graeme Norgate left Rare in 1998 to start Free Radical Design. From there he worked on the video game series TimeSplitters and two other video games called Haze and Second Sight.

Doak left Free Radical - now known as Deep Silver Dambuster Studios - in 2009 and set up his own Nottingham-based studio, Zinkyzonk, which would develop games for Facebook. The company evolved from his defunct studio Pumpkin Beach. Zinkyzonk released its first game, Gangsta Zombies, on 11 July 2010 in partnership with Jolt Online Gaming. The company was dissolved in April 2013.

Since 2016, Doak lectures at Norwich University of the Arts.

On 19 May 2021, Deep Silver announced the reformation of Free Radical Design with David Doak and Steve Ellis as studio heads to make a new TimeSplitters game. On 11 December 2023, the reformed Free Radical Design was closed down, and the new TimeSplitters game has been cancelled as a result.

On 9 April 2026, Doak and Steve Ellis released Beyond Words, a video game mixing Scrabble with roguelike elements.

Doak listed Defender's arcade version, Laser Squad on the ZX Spectrum, The Legend of Zelda: Link's Awakening, The Legend of Zelda: A Link to the Past, Missile Command's arcade version, Monkey Island 2: LeChuck's Revenge, Peter Pack Rat's arcade version, The Secret of Monkey Island, Space Duel, Super Bomberman, Super Mario Kart, and XPilot as his favorite games in 2000.

== Works cited ==
- "The 100 best games of all time". Edge. No. 80. Future plc. 2000.
