= Second Sight (video game) =

2004 video game

- Developer: Free Radical Design
- Publisher: Codemasters (Note: Re-release version published by THQ Nordic.)
- Director: Rob Letts
- Producer: Martin Wakeley
- Artist: Karl Hilton
- Writers: David Doak; Andrew Lawson
- Composers: Graeme Norgate; Christian Marcussen
- Platforms: GameCube, PlayStation 2, Xbox, Windows
- Release: GameCube, PlayStation 2 & Xbox: PAL: 3 September 2004; NA: 21 September 2004; Windows: EU: 4 February 2005; AU: 12 February 2005; NA: 18 February 2005
- Genres: Action-adventure, stealth
- Mode: Single-player

Second Sight is a science fiction action-adventure video game, developed by Free Radical Design, and published by Codemasters for GameCube, PlayStation 2, Xbox in 2004, and Windows in 2005. The game's story sees players assume the role of an American parapsychology researcher who seeks to uncover their past through the use of psychic powers they possess, finding events in the present are linked to a military mission they undertook with a taskforce of U.S. Marines.

The game's action is divided between traditional gun combat and stealth, with emphasis on players making the most of the protagonist's different psychic abilities to survive against hostile opponents, as well as overcoming different obstacles in each level. The game received mostly favourable reviews, with the exception of the PC version which received mixed feedback. The game has sold one million copies worldwide and was nominated for "Originality" and "Best Game on GameCube" at 2nd British Academy Games Awards.

== Gameplay ==
In Second Sight, players explore levels primarily with a third-person perspective – which by default is in free-roam but can be switched to a fixed perspective – though at times the camera switches to a first-person viewpoint either by switching it through the camera controls, or when moving through a crawlspace. Each level features a set of tasks that culminate in the player reaching a goal to complete the level, with a different range of situations to overcome, including hostile enemies that either must be killed or avoided with stealth, as well as minor puzzles and obstacles to overcome.

Second Sight's most unique aspect of gameplay is the protagonist's ability to use a variety of psychic powers, which can be used either to aid the player in combat, heal themselves or others, avoid detection, and help to solve some puzzles. At the start of the game, the player begins with only a few powers, but unlock new ones and upgrades to those they possess as the story progresses. These powers drain the player's psychic energy either in a set amount or over time; if the player is drained of psychic energy, they are momentarily stunned for a few seconds, leaving them vulnerable.

For the most part, several levels emphasis the use of stealth to make progress, including watching the movement of hostiles, and making use of hiding places like closets. To assist in stealth, some levels provide a player with a silenced tranquilliser gun which can be used to silently knock out enemies. If the player is spotted by an enemy or a security camera, the alarm is raised, causing more hostiles to arrive within the area the protagonist is within. The alarm can only be cancelled if the player hides from enemies until they lose sight of them; when they do, enemies will return to their routines, with reinforcements replacing those who were taken out by the player before the alarm was raised.

Combat features not only unarmed fighting, but a range of different weapons including pistols, submachine guns, shotguns, assault rifles and sniper rifles. Cover can be used to protect against gunfire when shooting at enemies, with the game's targeting system designed to allow players to specifically target different parts on an enemy; the sniper rifle's scope is displayed on screen when used to target an enemy. Weapons can be used when in first-person, allowing more refined manual targeting for players to make use of.

== Plot ==
=== Setting ===
Second Sight takes place in a world in which parapsychology exists, and where secret research on its power after World War II uncovered evidence that psychic abilities could be genetically transferred into other human beings. The story's events take place across locations within the United States and Siberia, during the late 1990s.

=== Story ===
John Vattic, an American parapsychology researcher, awakens in a medical facility in Virginia with no recollection of his past, only the knowledge that he possesses powerful psychic abilities of unknown origin. Using these to escape his cell and explore the facility, he later experiences a flashback that reveals to him that six months ago, he was recruited by the Pentagon to join up with WinterICE - a special taskforce of U.S. Marines led by Colonel Joshua Starke, and his psychic adviser Jayne Wilde. The taskforce had been given orders to travel to Siberia to recover Victor Grienko, a renowned Russian scientist who had conducted extensive research into parapsychology, and was now seeking political asylum in the United States.

Whilst seeking further answers, Vattic is surprised when he comes across records on Wilde in the facility's computers, only to witness them change following a flashback where, instead of being killed on the mission, Wilde survived, only to be incarcerated at a mental asylum in Vermont after losing her mind. With no other leads, Vattic escapes the facility and travels to the asylum, breaking Wilde out. After she recovers her sanity in his presence, Wilde reveals that Starke was killed in his presence, causing Vattic to experience another flashback. In the past, he finds himself saving Starke - changing the past again as a result - while encountering the projection of a Russian boy, who claims he must help them and unlocks his psychic abilities in the past, revealing Vattic must get to their home beneath a village called Dubrensk.

In the present, Wilde leads Vattic to Starke's hideout in Queens, New York, and learns from Starke that their mission to secure Grienko led to them discovering American special forces operating in Siberia on the same task. Vattic learns the troops were being led by Silas Hanson, director of the National Security Executive, who used Starke and his team as scapegoats to cover up his actions, and who is now tying up loose ends. After Starke helps him to escape his tenement hideout, Vattic sees Hanson's people capture Wilde, and pursues them to the NSE headquarters in New Jersey. Exploring the facility, Vattic uncovers video evidence showing that Hanson seeks to create psychic supersoldiers from Grienko's work and moves to confront Hanson in his office. Finding Hanson cannot be defeated, no matter what he tries, Vattic forces himself to experience a flashback and return to the past.

Back in the past, Vattic explores Dubrensk on his own, after Wilde instructs Starke that his team has done what they can. Finding Grienko's research labs under the village, Vattic confronts Grienko with the knowledge he has from the present. Grienko, realizing Hanson had deceived him for his research, informs Vattic to head for the lower levels, before he is killed by an NSE agent. Making his way underground, Vattic suddenly hears Wilde's voice, telling him his perception of time is all wrong; in reality, the present is actually a possible future being shown to him by the final psychic ability he possessed, precognition, which had been active the whole time, with the "past" actually being the present. Learning that the Russian boy was one of several children who Grienko experimented on, Vattic realizes that they had foreseen what Hanson planned to do, and had contacted him, knowing he was the only one who could help them.

Now aware of the truth, and knowing what the future holds, Vattic tracks down Hanson to Grienko's lab and confronts him, only to discover him protected by a telekinesis-resistant bulletproof window. Releasing the children Grienko experimented on, they promptly use their powerful telekinesis abilities to reach Hanson and kill him. Returning to the surface, Vattic reunites with Starke and Wilde, who help him onto a helicopter leaving the area as American troops secure the location.

== Development ==
THQ Nordic have acquired the rights to the game in August 2018. The deal gives THQ Nordic the rights to republish the game, in addition to making new games, if they want. In April 2021, THQ Nordic relisted the game on Steam.

=== Soundtrack ===
In 2006, Free Radical Design made the Second Sight soundtrack available for download on the company website, including printable album artwork.

In 2012, Graeme Norgate made the soundtrack available on his personal Bandcamp page.

== Reception ==
Reception

Aggregate score
Aggregator	Score			
Aggregator	GameCube	PC	PS2	Xbox
Metacritic	77/100	73/100	76/100	75/100

Review scores
Publication	Score			
Publication	GameCube	PC	PS2	Xbox
Edge	7/10	N/A	7/10	7/10
Electronic Gaming Monthly	6.5/10	N/A	6.5/10	6.5/10
Eurogamer	N/A	6/10	N/A	8/10
Game Informer	8.5/10	N/A	8.5/10	8.5/10
GameRevolution	N/A	N/A	C	N/A
GameSpot	7.5/10	7.3/10	7.5/10	7.5/10
GameSpy	4/5	4/5	4/5	4/5
GameZone	N/A	7.5/10	8.6/10	N/A
IGN	7.9/10	7.5/10	7.9/10	7.9/10
Nintendo Power	4.7/5	N/A	N/A	N/A
Official U.S. PlayStation Magazine	N/A	N/A	4/5	N/A
Official Xbox Magazine (US)	N/A	N/A	N/A	8/10
PC Gamer (US)	N/A	65%	N/A	N/A
Detroit Free Press	N/A	4/4	N/A	N/A
The Sydney Morning Herald	N/A	N/A	4/5	N/A

Second Sight received "favorable" reviews on all platforms except the PC version, which received "average" reviews, according to review aggregator Metacritic.

In 2010, the game was included as one of the titles in the book 1001 Video Games You Must Play Before You Die.
