= Haze (video game) =

First-person shooter video game

- Developer: Free Radical Design
- Publishers: WW: Ubisoft; JP: Spike
- Director: David Doak
- Producers: Chris Lacey; Martin Wakeley; Martin Keywood
- Designers: Sandro Sammarco; Adam Cook; Tim Spencer
- Writer: Rob Yescombe
- Composers: Graeme Norgate; Christian Marcussen; Cris Velasco
- Platform: PlayStation 3
- Release: NA: May 20, 2008; JP: May 22, 2008; PAL: May 23, 2008
- Genre: First-person shooter
- Modes: Single-player, multiplayer

Haze is a first-person shooter video game developed by Free Radical Design and published by Ubisoft worldwide and Spike in Japan. The game revolves around Shane Carpenter, a soldier for the Mantel Corporation, who rebels after seeing the negative effects of a "nutritional supplement" named Nova-Keto-Thyrazine - also called Nectar that turns their soldiers into super soldiers in their fight against a rebel cell named the Promise Hand.

Haze was developer Free Radical Design's final game before it was acquired by Crytek. Prior to its release, Haze garnered significant attention from the media, who labeled it a "Halo killer". Releases for Xbox 360 and Microsoft Windows were originally slated, but it was announced as a PlayStation 3 exclusive in 2007, and after being pushed back to the following year, was released in May 2008. Haze attained mixed reviews from critics, who criticized the title's glitches and short single-player campaign.

== Gameplay ==
In Haze, soldiers make use of 'Nectar'. Mantel uses this drug to control the minds of its soldiers. When administered, Nectar can control what a soldier sees, among other things, similar to the effects of a hallucinogenic drug. Nectar drowns out images of death and destruction (for instance, bodies will vanish). Nectar also reduces recoil, and allows the player to zoom in further while scoped. An overdose of Nectar is dangerous, with loss of mental control and death being possible side effects. Nectar also enhances the soldiers' fighting capabilities, allowing them to run faster and jump higher. They also receive a boost in reaction time. A Mantel soldier experiencing an overdose is shown by a change in their armor, changing in color from yellow to red.

Rebel soldiers may go into a "Play Dead" state just before they are killed, allowing them to regenerate health and disappear from the Mantel soldiers' sight, since they can't see dead people while on Nectar. In addition, they exploit Mantel's dependence on Nectar by attacking the Nectar injector, extracting Nectar to use on throwing knives from dead Mantel troopers, and using the injector to create Nectar grenades. These Nectar-enhanced weapons will cause a Mantel trooper to overdose on Nectar, as will attacking the Nectar injector. Later in the game players also encounter special forces and overdosed soldiers that cannot be affected by Nectar-based weaponry. They can also steal a Mantel trooper's gun, dodge, and bury grenades in the ground as mines.

== Plot ==
Sergeant Shane Carpenter is a veteran Mantel soldier in a dystopian future where he was enticed by Mantel propaganda and dropped out of college. He arrives in the Boa region of South America, where Mantel troops have been dispatched to liberate the country from a rebel group known as "the Promise Hand" which is accused of ethnic cleansing and crimes against humanity by Mantel's mass media division. Shane meets his squad-mates: Sergeant Morgan Duvall, who is the leader of the squad, Lance Corporal Teare, and Corporals Peshy and "Watchstrap". Teare is quickly berated and dismissed by Duvall for not taking his requisite dose of Mantel's performance-enhancing drug, Nectar.

Shane joins Mantel in fighting the Promise Hand; his Nectar administrator fails to drug him on several occasions, causing him to witness a number of disturbing events: amongst them; he hears screams, implied to be Duvall torturing someone, and has a conversation with a pilot who, despite not having any wounds following a crash, dies. Duvall does not care about the discrepancies; Shane sees the dead bodies of civilian factory workers that Duvall's squad massacred in an earlier mission, as Duvall thinks that they can end up fighting back. Eventually, Shane and his squad are sent to capture Gabriel "Skincoat" Merino, the leader of the Promise Hand who supposedly eats his enemies and wears a long coat made of their skins. Shane captures Merino, only to find that he is an old man who's only wearing a sweater vest made out of cotton. Merino debates with Shane about war, asking him if he is on the right side. Duvall arrives and begins torturing Merino, cutting off one of his fingers. After entering the helicopter to return to base, Duvall brands Shane as a wuss and thinks he'll become an 'ape' like the rest of the rebels. When Duvall starts trying to cut off both of Merino's hands, Shane pulls a gun on the rest of his squad, leading to a shootout which causes the helicopter they are in to crash.

After crashing into a swamp, Shane tries to contact Mantel about the incident and his inability to administer his dose of Nectar, but fails and starts going into severe withdrawal and experiences hallucinations from it. Mantel forces, realizing that Shane is not taking the proper levels of Nectar and thinking he has gone rogue, mark him for death by labeling him a "Code Haze" (Terminate with Extreme Prejudice) and send in their Black Ops (Mantel's professional soldiers, in contrast to Mantel's regular drug-fueled troopers) to kill him. However, Shane escapes death from the Black Ops by a "Promise Hand" scout that leads him underground. However, in the underground, he loses consciousness due to Nectar withdrawal. Shane is rescued by Merino and the Promise Hand, and realizes that everything he's been told about them has been false propaganda by Mantel. Shane is forced to kill Peshy and Watchstrap (who were also rescued from the crash by the Promise Hand) when they start shooting up the village. An insane Duvall, also alive, escapes after telling Shane he is an "animal" just like the rebels. Having witnessed the unwilling atrocities committed by delusional Mantel soldiers, Shane claims himself as a traitor but after Merino says he's on the right side, Shane swears allegiance to the Promise Hand in hope of doing the right thing and to undo the damage done by Mantel.

Answering a distress call from a wrecked Mantel cargo ship off a heavily fortified beach, Shane meets up with Teare. Teare, completely battered and wounded, reveals that when they first met, he sabotaged Shane's Nectar administrator to prevent him from entering the hallucinatory state it would usually give. Teare reveals the cargo ship is filled with the bodies of past Mantel troopers that the corporation was secretly disposing of; prolonged Nectar use has been proven to be eventually fatal, and Mantel has been concealing this fact by hiding all the bodies of Mantel troopers who have died from the drug, hiding the evidence. Teare also reveals that Mantel's stated humanitarian reasons for intervening in Boa are false propaganda and their real goal is the destruction of Nectar plants being grown by the local population, in order for Mantel to maintain its monopoly on Nectar production. After working on a plan to assault the observatory, Shane and his "Promise Hand" allies are ambushed by Mantel troops, having to detour and return to the village, but Teare is then killed by Mantel's Black Ops soldiers. The Mantel assault is repelled and the plan recommenced.

Leading the Promise Hand, Shane succeeds in destroying Mantel's regional supply of Nectar and remote control network at the observatory control room, causing the Mantel troopers to suffer mental and physical breakdowns from the withdrawal's side effects, to the point of suicide after witnessing the atrocities they committed. Merino orders an assault on Mantel's Landcarrier HQ to finish the war, but Shane is reluctant because Mantel's troopers are now largely defenseless and with no ability to administer Nectar, they no longer pose as a threat. Nonetheless, they begin their attack. During the assault on the Landcarrier, Shane confronts Duvall, who has taken over the Landcarrier due to being the only one disciplined enough to remain sane after suffering Nectar withdrawal. After a shootout in the control room, in which the two argue about right and wrong and the nature of war, Shane kills Duvall and escapes from the exploding Landcarrier. The story ends with Merino describing Shane as a "hero" and revealing his plans to use Nectar, in combination with free will, to give his people some "confidence". Merino states that Mantel "mismanaged" Nectar and denounces them as being "just animals", which greatly disturbs Shane, as it appears that Merino has learned nothing about what Mantel has done and plans to use Nectar to his own advantage.

== Development ==
According to creative director Derek Littlewood the game's concept was inspired by the film Apocalypse Now. The intention was to make a mature game with an anti-war message. David Doak has described the game in similar terms.

Haze was first announced at E3 2006. It makes use of a proprietary graphics engine that was developed specifically for the game. Though purchasing an engine would reduce the development time, the team chose to create their own in order to have more freedom in the features and game design. The engine provides various graphical effects. Lighting is mainly baked but the Haze Engine also has support for real time lighting and has a high-dynamic range. Particle and fire effects help give the illusion of volume along with motion blur and real time depth fields, the engine supports color Specular maps, Normal Mapping, and Parallax Mapping technologies. Haze runs at 30 frames per second; the team claimed that 60 frames per second was not needed for the pacing of the game. The AI system, "Conspire", is designed to allow enemies to dynamically react to other characters and the environment.

Haze was originally set to be released simultaneously on the PlayStation 3, Xbox 360, and PC in Summer 2007. However, the release date was pushed back to Winter, and it was announced at Sony's E3 2007 press conference that Haze would be exclusive to the PlayStation 3. This was a decision that had been made by Ubisoft. The game was then delayed further and eventually given a May 2008 release. Free Radical stated that the delays have allowed them to include several new features into the game.

On October 22, 2007, Ubisoft announced that nu metal band Korn had written and recorded an original song inspired by Haze. The song, which is also entitled "Haze", was released as a digital single in the U.S. on April 22, 2008. On February 26, 2008, a new trailer called "Nectar trailer" was released and featured the song.

On April 15, 2008, Ubisoft announced a playable demo would be available on the PlayStation Store in early May. The demo included the 4-player co-operative mode that appears in the final game.

== Reception ==
Reception

Aggregate score
Aggregator	Score
Metacritic	55/100

Review scores
Publication	Score
Edge	5/10
Eurogamer	4/10
Famitsu	34/40
Game Informer	6.25/10
GamePro	3.5/5
GameRevolution	C−
GameSpot	6/10
GameSpy	2/5
GameTrailers	6.2/10
GameZone	5.5/10
Giant Bomb	2/5
IGN	(UK) 6.5/10 (AU) 6.2/10 (US) 4.5/10
PlayStation: The Official Magazine	2.5/5
Common Sense Media	2/5
Digital Spy	3/5

Prior to release, Haze garnered considerable attention. Some media sources deemed it a "Halo killer." However, upon release, the game received generally mixed reviews, and holds a 55% approval according to the review aggregation website Metacritic.

Poor reviews included Giant Bomb, which gave it a negative review, largely due to its many glitches and extremely short single-player campaign. Eurogamer called it "this year's most significant gaming disappointment." Jeff Haynes of IGN criticized the "horrible plot, weak gameplay mechanics and visuals that are truly underwhelming. Tons of visual issues abound within the game from texture tears and non-descript environments to pop-in and odd animation problems." Greg Damiano of Game Revolution cited examples of bland gameplay and graphics and blistering sound, and commented that the main character, "Shane Carpenter, whines and pouts all through the campaign."

More generous reviews were also somewhat disappointed. Kevin VanOrd of GameSpot said, "This madly inconsistent shooter offsets a number of thrilling moments with terrible artificial intelligence and an awful story," and "A seven-hour campaign and uneventful multiplayer modes just don't cut it in light of the far better modern shooters available on the market."

In one of its more positive reviews, PSM3 said the game "fails to better Unreal Tournament 3, Resistance and Call of Duty 4: Modern Warfare" and it "feels like a novel idea that missed its window of opportunity," but said "there is a certain charm to it." The review concluded that the game is "worth a look, but shabby visuals, unfulfilling plot and dull set-pieces mean it's not a classic." In Japan, where the game was ported for release on May 22, 2008, Famitsu awarded the game 34/40.

Digital Spy gave it three out of five and called it "a surprise lapse for Free Radical. For a company that has churned out some sensational hits, this effort is a real disappointment. With shoddy graphics, slack gameplay and that poorly thought-out Nectar system, this first-person shooter is way behind the times." The A.V. Club gave it a C+ and said, "More narratively cohesive than the Halo trilogy, but less inventive and compelling than Resistance: Fall of Man, Haze does finally give us a self-aware portrait of videogame soldiers, and a foil for all the head-butting, 'boo-yah' behavior that's been the norm for far too long in the medium. Too bad it's paired with one of the more pedestrian FPS games to come along in recent years." 411Mania gave it 5.5 out of 10 and said, "There's really no reason to pick this one up over a title like Call of Duty 4 or Resistance – both will offer a far better experience and much more value for your money. The game had a lot of promise, but it's almost all unfulfilled." Common Sense Media gave it two out of five, saying, "When stacked up against fellow first-person shooters, Haze is incredibly weak."

In 2014, Den of Geek included the game in a list of their 25 Most Disappointing Games of the Xbox 360/PS3 Generation.

In 2015, The Guardian nominated Haze as one of the 30 worst video games of all time, noting that despite having an interesting concept it was "a hollow disappointment. The plot was impenetrable, the characters laughable and the single player campaign judderingly short."
