= Cevat Yerli =

Turk-German computer game developer

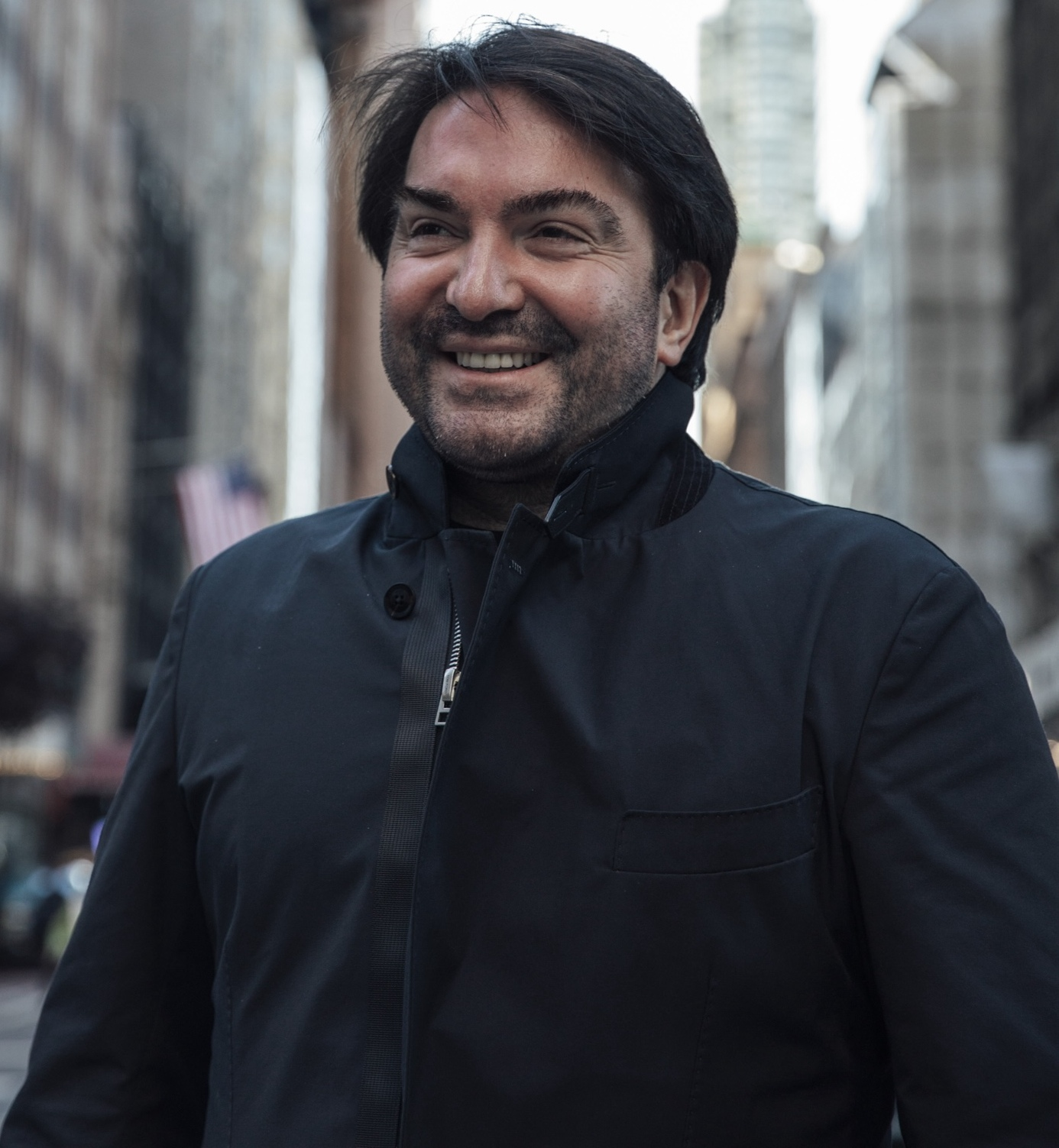
- Yerli in 2022
- Born: 1978 (age 47–48); Coburg, West Germany
- Occupation: Video game developer
- Known for: Co-Founder and former CEO & President of Crytek

Cevat Yerli (born 1978) is German video game developer. He co-founded Crytek, one of the largest video game developers in Germany, and served as its CEO and President until February 2018.

In 2017, Yerli launched The TMRW Foundation, a new for-profit deep tech organization.

== Crytek ==
Yerli founded Crytek in 1997 and formally turned it into a company in 1999. His brothers, Faruk and Avni, joined Crytek in 2000 and 2001, respectively. The company developed games such as Far Cry and the Crysis series. In 2006 Cevat visited South Korea and, influenced by the country's gaming culture, he launched Gface in 2012. GFACE was a social gaming network that hosted free-to-play titles streamed over the internet. Yerli was the director and executive producer on nearly all games until stepping down on 28 February 2018.

=== Games created ===
Year	Game	Notes
2004	Far Cry	creator, game director, executive producer
2007	Crysis	creator, game director, executive producer
2011	Crysis 2	game director, executive producer
2012	Warface	co-creator, executive producer
2012	Fibble	Executive Producer
2013	Crysis 3	game director, executive producer
2013	Ryse: Son of Rome	game director, executive producer
2014	The Collectables	executive producer
2016	Robinson - The Journey	executive producer
2016	The Climb	executive producer

== The TMRW Foundation ==
In 2017 Cevat launched a new company, The TMRW Foundation, independently from Crytek. It is a for-profit organisation that develops AI- and 3D-related technologies. One of the foundation’s initial projects involved being contracted by the UAE Ministry of Health in the creation of a metaverse service centre. As of October 2022, the TMRW Foundation employed 100 people. In 2022, Cevat and The TMRW Foundation premiered ROOM 3D at the GITEX Technology Fair in Dubai. ROOM 3D, a virtual teleconferencing platform, had taken approximately three years to develop and the aim is to reduce video call fatigue and let users interact with objects and their peers in a natural and learned way. It is the first live product operating on patented and browser first RealityOS, a cloud-based social 3D communications platform which has been developed by the TMRW Foundation.
