= League of Legends Rift Rivals =

Cross-regional League of Legend tournaments

Rift Rivals
Tournament information
- Sport: League of Legends
- Location: various
- Administrator: Riot Games
- Tournament format(s): Group stage Round robin Play-offs; Single elimination
- Host: Riot Games
- Participants: Europe – North America; China – South Korea – Taiwan/Hong Kong/Macau; Brazil – Latin America (2017–2018); Japan – Oceania – Southeast Asia (2017–2018); CIS – Turkey – Vietnam (2017–2018)

Rift Rivals (RR) was a series of cross-regional League of Legends tournaments organized by Riot Games from 2017–2019. Rift Rivals was five concurrent tournaments where related regions would be pitted against each other. Teams who placed the best in the Spring Split (or other opening season) of the year were invited to a tournament against another region's top teams. In 2019 Rift Rivals, the event was narrowed to only the two largest tournaments: the LCS (NALCS) vs. the LEC (EULCS) for North America vs. Europe, and the LPL vs. LCK vs. LMS-VCS for South Korea / China / Taiwan / Vietnam.

Due to the COVID-19 pandemic, 2020 Rift Rivals was canceled by Riot, as the originally scheduled timeslot in July 2020 was replaced by a delayed Mid-Season Invitational (MSI). Riot additionally announced it would "sunset" the tournaments.

== Blue Rift ==
- Europe – EU LCS (2017–2018) / LEC (2019)
- North America – NA LCS (2017–2018) / LCS (2019)

Year	Location	Regions		Final			
Year	Location	NA LCS/LCS	EU LCS/LEC	Winner	Score		Loser
2017	(Germany) Berlin	Team SoloMid	G2 Esports	NA LCS	3	0	EU LCS
2017	(Germany) Berlin	Cloud9	Unicorns of Love	NA LCS	3	0	EU LCS
2017	(Germany) Berlin	Phoenix1	Fnatic	NA LCS	3	0	EU LCS
2018	(United States) Los Angeles	Team Liquid	Fnatic	EU LCS	3	1	NA LCS
2018	(United States) Los Angeles	100 Thieves	G2 Esports	EU LCS	3	1	NA LCS
2018	(United States) Los Angeles	Echo Fox	Splyce	EU LCS	3	1	NA LCS
2019	(United States) Los Angeles	Team Liquid	G2 Esports	LEC	3	1	LCS
2019	(United States) Los Angeles	Team SoloMid	Origen	LEC	3	1	LCS
2019	(United States) Los Angeles	Cloud9	Fnatic	LEC	3	1	LCS

== Red Rift ==
- China (LPL)
- South Korea (LCK)
- Taiwan/Hong Kong/Macao (LMS) (2017–2018) / Taiwan/Hong Kong/Macao-Vietnam (LMS-VCS) (2019)

Year	Location	Regions			Final				Third place
Year	Location	LPL	LCK	LMS/LMS-VCS	Winner	Score		Runner-up	Third place
2017	(Taiwan) Kaohsiung	Team WE	SK Telecom T1	Flash Wolves	LPL	3	1	LCK	LMS
2017	(Taiwan) Kaohsiung	Royal Never Give Up	kt Rolster	ahq e-Sports Club	LPL	3	1	LCK	LMS
2017	(Taiwan) Kaohsiung	Edward Gaming	Samsung Galaxy	J Team	LPL	3	1	LCK	LMS
2017	(Taiwan) Kaohsiung	OMG	MVP	Machi 17	LPL	3	1	LCK	LMS
2018	(China) Dalian	Royal Never Give Up	KING-ZONE DragonX	Flash Wolves	LPL	3	2	LCK	LMS
2018	(China) Dalian	Edward Gaming	Afreeca Freecs	G-Rex	LPL	3	2	LCK	LMS
2018	(China) Dalian	Rogue Warriors	kt Rolster	MAD Team	LPL	3	2	LCK	LMS
2018	(China) Dalian	Invictus Gaming	SK Telecom T1	Machi e-Sports	LPL	3	2	LCK	LMS
2019	(South Korea) Seoul	Invictus Gaming	SK Telecom T1	Flash Wolves	LCK	3	1	LPL	LMS-VCS
2019	(South Korea) Seoul	JD Gaming	Griffin	MAD Team	LCK	3	1	LPL	LMS-VCS
2019	(South Korea) Seoul	FunPlus Phoenix	KING-ZONE DragonX	Dashing Buffalo	LCK	3	1	LPL	LMS-VCS
2019	(South Korea) Seoul	Top Esports	DAMWON Gaming	EVOS Esports	LCK	3	1	LPL	LMS-VCS

== Yellow Rift ==
- Brazil (BR)
- Latin America North (LAN)
- Latin America South (LAS)

Year	Location	Regions			Final				Third place
Year	Location	BR	LAN	LAS	Winner	Score		Runner-up	Third place
2017	(Chile) Santiago	RED Canids	Lyon Gaming	Isurus Gaming	BR	3	2	LAS	LAN
2017	(Chile) Santiago	Keyd Stars	Just Toys Havoks	Furious Gaming	BR	3	2	LAS	LAN
2018	(Brazil) São Paulo	KaBuM! e-Sports	Rainbow7	Kaos Latin Gamers	BR	3	1	LAS	LAN
2018	(Brazil) São Paulo	Vivo Keyd	Infinity eSports	Rebirth eSports	BR	3	1	LAS	LAN

== Purple Rift ==
- Japan (JP)
- Oceania (OCE)
- Southeast Asia (SEA)

Year	Location	Regions			Final				Third place
Year	Location	JP	OCE	SEA	Winner	Score		Runner-up	Third place
2017	(Vietnam) Ho Chi Minh City	Rampage	Dire Wolves	GIGABYTE Marines	JP	3	1	SEA	OCE
2017	(Vietnam) Ho Chi Minh City	DetonatioN FocusMe	Legacy Esports	Ascension Gaming	JP	3	1	SEA	OCE
2017	(Vietnam) Ho Chi Minh City	Unsold Stuff Gaming	Sin Gaming	Mineski	JP	3	1	SEA	OCE
2018	(Australia) Sydney	PENTAGRAM	Dire Wolves	Ascension Gaming	OCE	3	1	SEA	JP
2018	(Australia) Sydney	DetonatioN FocusMe	Chiefs Esports Club	Kuala Lumpur Hunters	OCE	3	1	SEA	JP
2018	(Australia) Sydney	Unsold Stuff Gaming	Legacy Esports	Mineski	OCE	3	1	SEA	JP

== Green Rift ==
- Commonwealth of Independent States (CIS)
- Turkey (TR)
- Vietnam (VN, since 2018)

Year	Location	Regions			Final				Third place
Year	Location	CIS	TR	VN	Winner	Score		Runner-up	Third place
2017	(Russia) Moscow	Virtus.pro	Supermassive eSports	N/A	TR	3	0	CIS	N/A
2017	(Russia) Moscow	Vaevictis eSports	Oyunfir Crew	N/A	TR	3	0	CIS	N/A
2017	(Russia) Moscow	Vega Squadron	Team Aurora	N/A	TR	3	0	CIS	N/A
2017	(Russia) Moscow	M19	1907 Fenerbahçe eSports	N/A	TR	3	0	CIS	N/A
2018	(Vietnam) Ho Chi Minh City	Gambit Esports	SuperMassive eSports	EVOS Esports	TR	3	1	CIS	VN
2018	(Vietnam) Ho Chi Minh City	RoX	Royal Bandits	GIGABYTE Marines	TR	3	1	CIS	VN
2018	(Vietnam) Ho Chi Minh City	Team Just	YouthCrew Esports	Vikings Gaming	TR	3	1	CIS	VN
