= Blue Mars =

Blue Mars may refer to:

- Blue Mars (novel), the third book in the Mars trilogy by Kim Stanley Robinson
- Blue Mars (video game), 3D massively multiplayer virtual world platform
