= Virtus.pro =

International esports organization

- Short name: VP
- Divisions: Dota 2 Counter-Strike 2 Rainbow Six Siege; Warface; EFT: Arena; PUBG Mobile; Standoff 2 EA Sports FC; Apex Legends; PUBG; Rennsport; Honor of Kings; Overwatch 2 World of Tanks; CoD: Warzone; Mobile Legends: Bang Bang; Marvel Rivals
- Founded: 1 November 2003; 22 years ago
- Location: Yerevan, Armenia
- Colors: Orange, Black, White
- CEO: Nikolai Petrossian
- Team title: 2× CS:GO Majors; 5× Dota 2 Majors
- Partners: Winline Kappa; Yandex Eats Thunderobot
- Website: virtus.pro

Virtus.pro (VP) is an international esports organization founded in 2003 in Russia and, partly due to the Russian invasion of Ukraine, acquired by Armenian investors in 2022. The organization has players competing in such games as Counter-Strike 2, Dota 2, Rainbow Six Siege, Apex Legends, Warface and EFT: Arena.

Virtus.pro's Dota 2 team has participated in multiple Majors, winning a record (tied with Team Secret) 5 of them and becoming the best Dota Pro Circuit first season team. Their League of Legends team won LCL Spring 2017.

VP's former Polish CS:GO team is considered one of the best teams in the history of Counter-Strike, winning the EMS One Katowice 2014 Major and several other premier tournaments. VP's 2022 CS:GO team, with CIS players, won the IEM Rio Major 2022 under the name Outsiders.

VP are also members of the Esports World Cup Foundation Club Support Program, funded by Saudi Arabia's Public Investment Fund.

== Ownership and naming ==
In November 2015, the team got an investment of over US$100,000,000 from Alisher Usmanov's USM Holdings. From 2015 to 2022 Virtus.pro was part of the ESforce Holding (and also part of VK). In March 2022 Virtus.pro created a new tag, Outsiders, due to the requirements of tournament operators and their claims to VP's parent company (VK) ties with the Russian government. Outsiders tag is a neutral name for the team.

In September 2022 Virtus.pro announced the acquisition of the club by Armenian investor Aram Karamanukyan. He became the new CEO of the club. Since then, in Dota 2 and other games, the club has been playing under its genuine name Virtus.pro, but continued to play in CS:GO as Outsiders. The new CEO claimed that he "contacted ESL [CS:GO tournament operator] to discuss the matter of performing under the name Virtus.pro" and "provided all supporting documents and are now awaiting a decision."

On 22 March 2023, CS:GO tournament organizers lifted their bans on the Virtus.pro name.

== Current divisions ==
=== Counter-Strike ===
==== History ====
On 25 January 2014, Virtus.pro signed the five member roster of AGAiN, Jarosław "pashaBiceps" Jarząbkowski, Janusz "Snax" Pogorzelski, Paweł "byali" Bieliński, and Golden Five players Wiktor "TaZ" Wojtas, Filip "Neo" Kubski. Virtus.pro won EMS One Katowice 2014 by beating Ninjas in Pyjamas in the finals. The team then got 5–8 at ESL One Cologne 2014. Virtus.pro won at ESEA in April 2015. The team then beat Natus Vincere to win CEVO Season 7 in July 2014.

In October 2015, it was announced that Virtus.pro had joined an esports team trade union along with a dozen other teams.

In 2016, Virtus.pro made it to the quarterfinals in MLG Columbus after beating G2 Esports 2–0 in a best-of-three game. The team then went on to win in the inaugural ELeague season, winning $390,000. In December 2016, Virtus.pro re-signed the roster for another four years. In 2017, Virtus.pro finishes 2nd place at the ELEAGUE Atlanta major, winning $150k, and won DreamHack Masters - Las Vegas 2017, winning $200k. Virtus.pro finished 2nd place at EPICENTER 2017, winning $100k.

Due to poor results, on 13 December 2018, Virtus.pro CS:GO roster was suspended.

"Vegi" replaced "Toao" in the active squad and "Snax" takes over IGL role in 2019. Due to poor results and grown unhappy with the team, Paweł "byali" Bieliński decided to leave Virtus.pro. VP adds Okoliciouz as a replacement for byali. Virtus.pro decided to test some players out, benching Michał "Okoliciouz" Głowaty that had a short lived place in the VP squad, replaced by a stand in Tomasz "phr" Wójcik. Virtus.pro win Polish Esport League Spring in 2019, earning $10,708. This event was the first 1st-place finish since Adrenaline Cyber League 2017, which was won by the original roster. In December 2019, Virtus.pro announced that they have completed the signing of the AVANGAR roster, benching the Polish roster.

In May 2020, Virtus.pro acquired "YEKINDAR" from pro100 as "buster" steps down from the starting lineup. Additionally, "Flatra" joined as an assistant coach.

The roster competed under the name Outsiders from early March 2022, following several tournament organizers banning esports teams suspected to have ties to the Russian government. Under the Outsiders tag the team won IEM Rio Major 2022, beating Heroic in the final. On 22 March 2023, tournament organizers ESL and BLAST lifted the ban on Virtus.pro.

On 17 December 2023, Virtus.pro defeated Apeks at ESL Challenger Atlanta 2023, where Pyotr "fame" Bolyshev was awarded his first ever HLTV MVP award. Their victory at the event qualified the roster for ESL Pro League Season 19.

On 14 April 2024, Virtus.pro announced the signing of previous Natus Vincere and Cloud9 player Denis "electroNic" Sharipov. On 25 June 2025, Virtus.pro officially completed its Counter‑Strike 2 roster with the addition of Ilya "Perfecto" Zalutskiy, who took over the slot previously held by Timur "FL4MUS" Marev.

==== Roster ====
Virtus.pro Counter-Strike 2 roster
Players
Coaches

Handle	Name	Nationality
FL1T	Lebedev, Evgeny	Russia
fame	Bolyshev, Petr	Russia
ICY	Faiznurov, Kaisar	Kazakhstan
Perfecto	Zalutskiy, Ilya	Russia
n0rb3r7 (I)	Danielyan, David	Russia
electroNic (I)	Sharipov, Denis	Russia
FL4MUS (I)	Marev, Timur	Russia

Head coach

- Ivan "F_1N" Kochugov

Legend:
- (I) Inactive
- (S) Suspended
- Substitute
- (injured) Injury / Illness

Roster updated 28 August 2025.

=== Dota 2 ===
==== History ====
Virtus.pro attended The International 2014 and placed 5th-6th at The International 2015. Virtus.pro released its squad after failing to qualify for The International 2016, but reformed shortly after. In November 2016, the team won The Summit 6 LAN event, sweeping OG 3–0 in a best-of-five series. Virtus.pro placed 5th-6th at The International 2017. Virtus.pro wins ESL One Hamburg 2017, the first major of the 2017-2018 Dota Pro Circuit season. In 2018, Virtus.pro won four majors, winning ESL One Katowice 2018, The Bucharest Major and ESL One Birmingham 2018; they also became the first team to win two ESL One majors back-to-back. In the new season of the 2018-2019 Dota Pro Circuit season, they became the winner of the first major of the season, the Kuala Lumpur Major.

Despite being second place on 2018-2019 Dota Pro Circuit season and one of the favorites to win The International 2019, Virtus.pro got knocked out of the tournament by Royal Never Give Up, ending their journey with a 9th-12th place. After the disappointing run, the roster was rebuilt, with Ramzes and 9pasha leaving the team after staying with the team for almost three years. Austin «Cap» Walsh commented that the team's previous roster was unsalvageable because of bad results at every The International they've ever played: «If you've played this many TIs and can't even get close to the finals, there's obviously something wrong».

On 1 April 2020, Virtus.pro announced its second Dota 2 lineup: VP.Prodigy. On 17 May 2020, VP.Prodigy's youth squad defeated Virtus.pro to win the Epic Prime League. In July 2020, Virtus.pro, the Russian cybersporting organization, ranked among the top 3 in Europe and the CIS in terms of prize money, percentage of wins and tournament placements during the quarantine period. On 5 November, a new roster is announced consisting of the current VP.Prodigy's roster, leading to impressive results in the Dota Pro Circuit regional leagues in 2021.

Following the Russian invasion of Ukraine, Virtus.pro roster played under the 'Outsiders' temporary tag to avoid ESL's ban on Russian esports organisations. During a qualifying match leading up to ESL One Stockholm Major, player Ivan "Pure" Moskalenko drew a Z sign on the minimap, which was widely interpreted as expressing support for Russian invasion of Ukraine, a claim which Moskalenko later denied.

In response, Virtus.pro terminated its contract with Moskalenko, while tournament organisers, Beyond the Summit, in consultation with Valve, disqualified the team from the competition, issuing a retroactive forfeit for every match the team played. On 3 May 2023, the Virtus.pro cybersports organization announced that Sergey "G" Bragin has returned to the club as a Dota 2 lineup coach. Timur "Ahilles" Kulmukhambetov will shift to the position of lineup analyst instead of the coaching position.

Virtus.pro competed in the 1win Series Dota 2 Summer tournament, an event in June 2024, featuring eight invited teams and concluded the tournament in 5th–6th place.

==== Roster ====
Virtus.pro Dota 2 roster
Players
Coaches

Handle	Name	Nationality
squad1x	Kuvaldin, Ilya	Russia
Noticed	Ignatenko, Evgeniy	Russia
Kiritych (I)	Ulyanov, Ilya	Russia
Fng (I)	Barshak, Artem	Belarus

Head coach

- Sergey "G" Bragin

Legend:
- (I) Inactive
- (S) Suspended
- Substitute
- (injured) Injury / Illness

Roster

=== Rainbow Six Siege ===
On 16 May 2020, Virtus.pro enters the Rainbow Six scene by acquiring the roster of forZe Esports.

==== Roster ====
Virtus.pro Rainbow Six Siege roster
Players
Coaches

Handle	Name	Nationality
Nayqo	El Jabbari, Ilhan	France
p4sh4	Kosenko, Pavel	Russia
RORICK	Kruchinkin, Nikita	Russia
SkyZs	Jauleski, Christopher	France
dan-_-	Dontsov, Danila	Russia

Head coach

Cesar "Dark" Adriano

Legend:
- (I) Inactive
- (S) Suspended
- Substitute
- (injured) Injury / Illness

Latest roster transaction: 27 June 2026.

=== Warface ===
Virtus.pro signed a Warface roster on 14 July 2022.

==== Roster ====
Virtus.pro Warface roster
Players
Coaches

Handle	Name	Nationality
Трейз	Tagiev, Ali	Russia
Хокардик	Lazarenko, Nikita	Russia
Громэр	Zardiashvili, Zviad	Russia
КсэумХ	Gubanov, Alexander	Russia
Фэибер	Kuznetsov, Svyatoslav	Russia

Head coach

- Vacant

Legend:
- (I) Inactive
- (S) Suspended
- Substitute
- (injured) Injury / Illness

Latest roster transaction: 14 July 2022.

=== EFT: Arena ===
Virtus.pro launched a EFT: Arena roster on 5 December 2023. The team finished second in the first-ever EFT: Arena tournament, DreamHack Hannover.

Virtus.pro EFT: Arena roster
Players
Coaches

Handle	Name	Nationality
Rask	Ali, Alan	Russia
Andreezy	Baviyan, Andrey	Russia
FMX	Kurzin, Yaroslav	Russia
magiik777	Rusanov, Kirill	Russia
H4RD	Alyokhin, Viktor	Russia

Head coach

Vladimir "valder" Pospelov

Legend:
- (I) Inactive
- (S) Suspended
- Substitute
- (injured) Injury / Illness

Latest roster transaction: 5 December 2023.

=== PUBG ===
Virtus.pro launched their PUBG division in 2020 by signing Northern Lights Team's roster. The squad dominated in Europe and secured several high placing in top-tier international events, including top-3 at PGC 2021. That roster was disbanded in 2022.

In 2024, Virtus.pro returned to PUBG with a new team.

Virtus.pro PUBG roster
Players
Coaches

Handle	Name	Nationality
ibiza	van Geldere, Jord	Netherlands
Lukarux	Rukavina, Luka	Croatia
NIXZYEE	Mikec, Nino	Croatia
Beami	Steffensen, Benjamin	Denmark

Head coach

Kieron "Scoom" Prescott

Legend:
- (I) Inactive
- (S) Suspended
- Substitute
- (injured) Injury / Illness

Latest roster transaction: 3 May 2024.

=== PUBG Mobile ===
Virtus.pro entered PUBG Mobile in 2021.

Virtus.pro PUBG Mobile roster
Players
Coaches

Handle	Name	Nationality
Tixzy	Gordeev, Daniil	Russia
MALOYYY	Kholodnyak, Maxim	Kazakhstan
FROZEN	Leontyev, Ivan	Russia
MILKYWAY (I)	Trishin, Aleksandr	Russia

Head coach

Cristian-Roman "KOMPOT" Corbu

Legend:
- (I) Inactive
- (S) Suspended
- Substitute
- (injured) Injury / Illness

Latest roster transaction: 21 March 2024.

=== Standoff 2 ===
In March 2024, Virtus.pro signed a roster in the mobile game FPS Standoff 2.

Virtus.pro Standoff 2 roster
Players
Coaches

Handle	Name	Nationality
Lunax	Makarov, Nikita	Russia
reason	Kurbanov, Samir	Russia
Rendyy	Hakobyan, Grach	Armenia
PorcelaiN	Gasparov, Levan	Georgia
GentlemaN	Belyaev, Artem	Russia

Head coach

Timur "JOHNY" Rizaev

Legend:
- (I) Inactive
- (S) Suspended
- Substitute
- (injured) Injury / Illness

Latest roster transaction: 10 April 2025.

=== EA Sports FC ===
VP have a roster in EA Sports FC. In 2024, the club signed 2 players: Robert "Ufenok77" Fakhretdinov and Daniil "Abel" Abeldyaev. Ufenok left the club in September, with Abel staying as a club's single player in EA Sports FC.

In January 2025, VP signed a popular YouTube content creator and a former competitive player Anton "klenoff" Klenov as a coach.

=== Rennsport ===
Virtus.pro launched a division in simracing in May 2024 by signing a team of pilots to compete in ESL R1, the official sim racing league of Rennsport. This acquisition may have been funded thanks to the Esports World Cup Foundation Club Support Program, of which VP is a member.

Virtus.pro Rennsport roster
Players
Coaches

Handle	Name	Nationality
	Statsenko, Mikhail	Russia
	Fiala, Vojtěch	Czech Republic
	McCormack, Dáire	Ireland
	Ellis Jr, Kevin	United Kingdom
(I)	Zholobov, Oleg	Russia

Head coach

- Vacant

Legend:
- (I) Inactive
- (S) Suspended
- Substitute
- (injured) Injury / Illness

Latest roster transaction: 3 May 2024.

=== Apex Legends ===
Virtus.pro first ventured into Apex Legends in 2019 by signing the FlavorOfTheMonth roster. It was disbanded in 2020.

In 2024, the club came back with a new roster.

Virtus.pro Apex Legends roster
Players
Coaches

Handle	Name	Nationality
slayr	Ryals, Evan	United States
lou	Clements, Trenton	United States
Zach	Mazer, Zachary	United States

Head coach

- Vacant

Legend:
- (I) Inactive
- (S) Suspended
- Substitute
- (injured) Injury / Illness

=== Honor of Kings ===
Virtus.pro signed a roster in mobile MOBA Honor of Kings in 2024.

Virtus.pro Honor of Kings roster
Players
Coaches

Handle	Name	Nationality
Nighty	Hu, Giorgio	Italy
Roc	Zhang, Peng	China
Hai1ang	Raza, Martin	Germany
TGold	Zhang, Xin Valentino	Italy
Clue	Maaroufi, Rayan Mohamed	France

Head coach

Ruoran "Xu” Xu

Legend:
- (I) Inactive
- (S) Suspended
- Substitute
- (injured) Injury / Illness

Latest roster transaction: 26 Feb 2026.

=== Overwatch 2 ===
Virtus.pro signed a roster in Overwatch 2 in 2024, prior to EWC.

Virtus.pro Overwatch 2 roster
Players
Coaches

Handle	Name	Nationality
Galaa	López, Jesús Núñez	Spain
JaeWoo	Jaewoo, Kim	South Korea
FiXa	Yeonghun, Kwon	South Korea
Vestola	Vestola, Ilari	Finland
sHockWave	Jensen, Niclas Smidt	Denmark

Head coach

Cho "SMASH" Bee-won

Legend:
- (I) Inactive
- (S) Suspended
- Substitute
- (injured) Injury / Illness

Latest roster transaction: 11 July 2024.

=== World of Tanks ===
Virtus.pro signed their first roster in WoT in July 2012. The squad was disbanded in 2015.

In 2024, Virtus.pro returned with a new roster.

Virtus.pro World of Tanks roster
Players
Coaches

Handle	Name	Nationality
TheAnatolich	Barakov, Anatoly	Russia
Positive	Drozhzhin, Evgeny	Belarus
Wilf_	Makarenko, Vladimir	Russia
Diffynder	Kulakov, Dmitriy	Russia
AiM	Shevchenko, Alexey	Russia
BEOWULF422	Iavorskii, Ivan	Russia
EviL	Osipenko, Kirill	Russia

Head coach

Nikita "SILIQ" Klimin

Legend:
- (I) Inactive
- (S) Suspended
- Substitute
- (injured) Injury / Illness

Latest roster transaction: 16 October 2024.

=== CoD: Warzone ===
VP laucned a roster in CoD: Warzone in December 2024.

Virtus.pro CoD: Warzone roster
Players
Coaches

Handle	Name	Nationality
Newbz	Juan, Edy Alberto	United States
Sage	Quinones, Angel Edward	Mexico
Dongy	Ledbetter Jr., Christopher Allen	United States

Head coach

- Vacant

Legend:
- (I) Inactive
- (S) Suspended
- Substitute
- (injured) Injury / Illness

Roster updated 5 February 2025.

=== Mobile Legends: Bang Bang ===
Virtus.pro have two rosters in MLBB: a men's and a women's teams, signed in February, 2025.

Virtus.pro MLBB Fe roster
Players
Coaches

Handle	Name	Nationality
DAISY	Ngoc Anh, Nong Thi	Vietnam
Starsoyy	Putri, Anisa	Indonesia
SAA	Yen Nhi, Vang Thi	Vietnam
Feyy	Meranti, Fenisa Hamida	Indonesia
KAO	Huyen Trang, Do Thi	Vietnam

Head coach

Rahmad "BULAT" Fadillah

Legend:
- (I) Inactive
- (S) Suspended
- Substitute
- (injured) Injury / Illness

Roster updated 12 February 2025.

Virtus.pro MLBB M roster
Players
Coaches

Handle	Name	Nationality
zaur egoist	Magomadov, Zaur	Russia
BadKot	Bogomolov, Denis	Russia
Bober	Belyaev, Dmitry	Russia
Saba	Orlov, Alexander	Russia
Super Egorka	Bugayev, Egor	Russia

Head coach

Kenneth "FlySolo" Coloma

Legend:
- (I) Inactive
- (S) Suspended
- Substitute
- (injured) Injury / Illness

Roster updated 13 February 2025.

=== Marvel Rivals ===
VP signed a roster for Marvel Rivals on February 19, 2025.

Virtus.pro Marvel Rivals roster
Players
Coaches

Handle	Name	Nationality
Finnsi	Jónasson, Finnbjörn	Iceland
dridro	Szanto, Arthur	France
Sypeh	Klein, Mikkel	Denmark
Nevix	Karlsson, Andreas	Sweden
SparkR	Andersson, William	Sweden
phi	Handke, Philip	Germany

Head coach

Josue "eqo" Corona

Legend:
- (I) Inactive
- (S) Suspended
- Substitute
- (injured) Injury / Illness

Roster updated 19 February 2025.

=== Rocket League ===
VP signed the roster of Luminosity Gaming on May 14, 2025, Catalysm, sosa and Sphinx joined with mectos as their coach and revenge as the manager. revenge left on May 28 and the team was released September 18. VP later acquired the roster of REDACTED on February 18, 2026, consisting of 2Piece, Tawk, Wahvey and MEMORY.

Virtus.pro Marvel Rivals roster
Players
Coaches

Handle	Name	Nationality
2Piece	Horton, Jayden	United States
Tawk	Hawco, Cohen	Canada
Wahvey	Thanus, Dylan	United States

Head coach

Michaal "MEMORY" Moss

Legend:
- (I) Inactive
- (S) Suspended
- Substitute
- (injured) Injury / Illness

Roster updated 19 April 2026.

== Former divisions ==
=== Fortnite ===
On 19 July 2018, Virtus.pro opened a division of Fortnite, the first players in the new discipline were Arthur "7ssk7" Kurshin and Jamal "Jamside" Saydayev. On 21 September 2018, Dmitry "HURMA" Heins and Seid-Magomed "FiveSkill" Edilgireev joined the organization. On 16 October 2019, "FiveSkill" and "HURMA" leave the team. On 29 April 2021, VP announced their decision to temporarily leave the discipline.

=== Starcraft 2 ===
Virtus.pro signed their first SC II roster in 2011. On 1 July 2014, Virtus.pro announced that they closed the StarCraft II section of their organization and that they would now focus on League of Legends instead.

In May 2024 VP have returned to this title, signing the highest ranked American athlete Maxwell "Astrea" Angel, who left the team in September.

=== League of Legends ===
On 28 June 2014, Virtus.pro acquired the roster of Dragon Team. Soon the team disbands, but in November 2016 Virtus.pro re-opened its LoL division and acquired the LCL Spot of Vaevictis Syndicate. On 19 September 2017, the organization closed its League of Legends department.

=== Artifact ===
21 June 2018, long before the official release of the game, Virtus.pro announced its first player in the discipline, a former Hearthstone player Maria "Harleen" Kobzar. On 23 November 2018, Artem "DrHippi" Kravets, who previously defended the colors of Virtus.pro in Hearthstone, and Olzhas "Naiman" Batyrbekov joined the team. 29 November 2018 Artifact was released on sale. 27 February 2019 "DrHippi" and "Harleen" left the team. On 10 September "Naiman" retires and Virtus.pro leaves Artifact.

=== Deadlock ===
On August 25, 2025, Virtus.pro announced that it was parting ways with its Deadlock roster, which it had signed on February 1 earlier that year. Virtus.pro cited limited clarity regarding Deadlock’s competitive future, as well as its ongoing invite-only beta status.

Awards and achievements
Preceded by DreamHack Winter 2013; Fnatic	EMS One Katowice 2014 winner 2014	Succeeded by ESL One Cologne 2014; Ninjas in Pyjamas
Preceded by PGL Major Antwerp 2022; FaZe Clan	IEM Rio Major 2022 winner (as Outsiders); 2022	Succeeded by BLAST Paris Major 2023; Team Vitality
