= 2017 League of Legends Rift Rivals =

Series of esports tournaments

Rift Rivals 2017
Tournament information
- Sport: League of Legends
- Location: (Germany) Berlin (Taiwan) Kaohsiung (Chile) Santiago (Russia) Moscow (Vietnam) Ho Chi Minh City
- Dates: 3–9 July 2017
- Administrator: Riot Games
- Tournament format(s): Group stage Round robin Play-offs; Single elimination
- Host: Riot Games
- Participants: Top teams of Spring split from 13 regions

Final positions
- Champions: North America; China; Brazil; Japan; Turkey
- 1st runner-up: Europe; South Korea; Latam South; Southeast Asia; CIS
- 2nd runner-up: TW/HK/MO; Latam North; Oceania

The 2017 League of Legends Rift Rivals was the first Rift Rivals - a series of cross-regional League of Legends tournaments organised by Riot Games, held on 3–9 July 2017 in Berlin, Kaohsiung, Santiago, Moscow and Ho Chi Minh City.

Thirteen regions participated in five concurrent tournaments, with each tournament pitting teams from either two or three rival regions against each other.

== Blue Rift (EU vs NA) ==
The 2017 Rift Rival between North America (NA) - Europe (EU) featured the top three teams from each region's Spring Split. This event took place in Berlin.

- Start date: 5 July 2017
- End date: 8 July 2017
- Patch: 7.13

Participant teams
NA	EU
Team SoloMid	G2 Esports
Cloud9	Unicorns of Love
Phoenix1	Fnatic

- Format of the group stage: Each EU team plays each NA team. Best of one, double round robin. The best team from each region plays in the final.

Group Stage
Rank	EU			NA		
1	Unicorns of Love	3	3	Team SoloMid	5	1
2	Fnatic	2	4	Phoenix1	4	2
3	G2 Esports	1	5	Cloud9	3	3

- Format of the final: Best of five

Region	Team	Game					Result
Region	Team	1	2	3	4	5	Result
EU	Unicorns of Love	L	L	L	-	-	0
NA	Team Solomid	W	W	W	-	-	3

== Red Rift (CN - KR - LMS) ==
The 2017 Rift Rival between China (CN) - South Korea (KR) - Taiwan/Hong Kong/Macau (LMS) featured the top four Spring Split teams from each region. This event took place in Kaohsiung.

- Start date: 6 July 2017
- End date: 9 July 2017
- Patch: 7.12

Participant teams
Seed	CN	KR	LMS
1	Team WE	SK Telecom T1	Flash Wolves
2	Royal Never Give Up	KT Rolster	Ahq e-Sports Club
3	Edward Gaming	Samsung Galaxy	J Team
4	OMG	MVP	Machi 17

- Format of the group stage: Single round robin. Teams with the same seeding play each other to get points for their region. The best region is automatically seeded into the final. The remaining regions play a semifinal to advance to the final.

Group Stage
Seed	CN (2–6)			KR (6–2)			LMS (4-4)		
1	Team WE	0	2	SK Telecom T1	2	0	Flash Wolves	1	1
2	Royal Never Give Up	1	1	KT Rolster	1	1	Ahq e-Sports Club	1	1
3	Edward Gaming	0	2	Samsung Galaxy	2	0	J Team	1	1
4	OMG	1	1	MVP	1	1	Machi 17	1	1

- Format Play-off: Relay best of five. Matchup determined by coaches from both sides. If a fifth game is needed, each region decides which team plays in it.

Semifinal			Final
			1	KR	1
2	LMS	2		CN	3
3	CN	3

Semifinal
Game	CN	3	2	LMS
1	Team WE	W	L	J Team
2	OMG	L	W	Flash Wolves
3	Edward Gaming	L	W	Ahq e-Sports Club
4	Royal Never Give Up	W	L	Machi 17
5	Team WE	W	L	Flash Wolves

Grand Final
Game	CN	3	1	KR
1	Edward Gaming	W	L	Samsung Galaxy
2	Team WE	W	L	SK Telecom T1
3	OMG	L	W	KT Rolster
4	Royal Never Give Up	W	L	MVP

== Yellow Rift (BR - LAN - LAS) ==
The 2017 Rift Rival between Brazil (BR) - Latin America North (LAN) - Latin America South (LAS) featured the top two Spring Split teams from each region. This event took place in Santiago.

- Start Date: 5 July 2017
- End Date: 8 July 2017
- Patch: 7.12

Participant teams
LAN	BR	LAS
Lyon Gaming	RED Canids	Isurus Gaming
Just Toys Havoks	Keyd Stars	Furious Gaming

- Format of the group stage: Single round robin. Each team plays all teams from the other two regions to get points for their region. The best region is automatically seeded into the final. The remaining regions play a semifinal.

Group Stage
BR (5–3)			LAS (5–3)			LAN (2–6)		
BR 1-3 LAS						LAN (2–6)		
Keyd Stars	3	1	Furious Gaming	3	1	Lyon Gaming	2	2
RED Canids	2	2	Isurus Gaming	2	2	Just Toys Havoks	0	4

- Format of the playoff: Relay best of five. Each region's team plays each team from the other region. If a fifth game is needed, each region decides which team plays in it.

Semifinal			Final
			1	LAS	1
2	BR	3		BR	3
3	LAN	2

Semifinal
Game	BR	3	2	LAN
1	Keyd Stars	L	W	Lyon Gaming
2	RED Canids	W	L	Just Toys Havoks
3	Keyd Stars	W	L	Just Toys Havoks
4	RED Canids	L	W	Lyon Gaming
5	Keyd Stars	W	L	Lyon Gaming

Grand Final
Game	BR	3	2	LAS
1	Keyd Stars	W	L	Furious Gaming
2	RED Canids	L	W	Isurus Gaming
3	RED Canids	W	L	Furious Gaming
4	Keyd Stars	L	W	Isurus Gaming
5	RED Canids	W	L	Isurus Gaming

== Purple Rift (JP - OCE - SEA) ==
The 2017 Rift Rival between Southeast Asia (SEA) - Oceania (OCE) - Japan (JP) featured the top three Spring Split teams from each region. This event took place in Ho Chi Minh City.

- Start Date: 3 July 2017
- End Date: 6 July 2017
- Patch: 7.12

Participant teams
Seed	JP	OCE	SEA
1	Rampage	Dire Wolves	(Vietnam) Gigabyte Marines
2	DetonatioN FocusMe	Legacy Esports	(Thailand) Ascension Gaming
3	Unsold Stuff Gaming	Sin Gaming	(Philippines) Mineski

- Format of the group stage: Single round robin. Teams with the same seeding play each other to get points for their region. Best region is automatically seeded into the final. The remaining regions play a semifinal.

Group Stage
Seed	JP (5–1)			OCE (3-3)			SEA (1–5)		
1	Rampage	1	1	Dire Wolves	1	1	Gigabyte Marines	1	1
2	DetonatioN FocusMe	2	0	Legacy Esports	1	1	Ascension Gaming	0	2
3	Unsold Stuff Gaming	2	0	Sin Gaming	1	1	Mineski	0	2

- Format of the semifinal: Relay best of five. Last man standing.
- Format of the final: Relay best of five. Teams with identical seeds play each other. No team plays more than two games.

Semifinal			Final
			1	JP	3
2	OCE	2		SEA	1
3	SEA	3

Semifinal
Game	OCE	2	3	SEA
1	Sin Gaming	W	L	Mineski
2	Sin Gaming	W	L	Ascension Gaming
3	Sin Gaming	L	W	Gigabyte Marines
4	Legacy Esports	L	W	Gigabyte Marines
5	Dire Wolves	L	W	Gigabyte Marines

Grand Final
Game	JP	3	1	SEA
1	Unsold Stuff Gaming	W	L	Mineski
2	DetonatioN FocusMe	W	L	Ascension Gaming
3	Rampage	L	W	Gigabyte Marines
4	Rampage	W	L	Gigabyte Marines
~~5~~	DetonatioN FocusMe	No need		Ascension Gaming

== Green Rift (CIS - TR) ==
The 2017 Rift Rival between Commonwealth of Independent States (CIS) and Turkey (TR) featured the top four Spring/Winter Split teams from each region. This event took place in Moscow.

- Start Date: 6 July 2017
- End Date: 9 July 2017
- Patch: 7.12

Participant teams
CIS	TR
Virtus.pro	Supermassive eSports
Vaevictis eSports	Oyunfir Crew
Vega Squadron	Team Aurora
M19	1907 Fenerbahçe eSports

- Format of the group stage: Each CIS team plays each TR team. Best of one, single round robin. The best team from each region plays in the final.

Group Stage
Rank	CIS			TR		
1	Vega Squadron	2	2	1907 Fenerbahce eSports	4	0
2	Virtus.pro	1	3	Oyunfir Crew	3	1
3	M19	0	4	Supermassive eSports	3	1
4	Vaevictis eSports	0	4	Team Aurora	3	1

- Format of the final: Best of five

Grand Final
Region	Team	Game					Result
Region	Team	1	2	3	4	5	Result
CIS	Vega Squadron	L	L	L	-	-	0
TR	1907 Fenerbahce eSports	W	W	W	-	-	3
