= Kuala Lumpur Major =

2018 esports tournament in Malaysia

Tournament information
- Sport: Dota 2
- Location: Kuala Lumpur, Malaysia
- Dates: 9–18 November 2018
- Administrator: Valve
- Tournament formats: Group stage; Round robin; Main event; Double elimination
- Host: PGL
- Venue: Axiata Arena
- Teams: 16 teams
- Purse: US$1,000,000

Final positions
- Champions: Virtus.pro
- 1st runner-up: Team Secret
- 2nd runner-up: Evil Geniuses

The Kuala Lumpur Major was a Dota 2 tournament, as part of the 2018–2019 Dota Pro Circuit season. The event was held from 9–18 November 2018 hosted at Axiata Arena in Kuala Lumpur.

16 teams are involved, of which 15 came through qualifying competitions. Three teams each from Europe, China, and North America and two teams each from CIS, Southeast Asia, and South America. Tigers won DreamLeague Season 10, earned an invite as a Minor champion.

== Teams ==
=== Qualification ===
Regional qualifiers began from 16 to 21 September 2018.

Europe (3)

- Team Secret
- Alliance
- Ninjas in Pyjamas

China (3)

- PSG.LGD
- Vici Gaming
- Team Aster

North America (3)

- Evil Geniuses
- Forward Gaming
- J.Storm

CIS (2)

- Virtus.pro
- Gambit Esports

Southeast Asia (2)

- Fnatic
- TNC Predator

South America (2)

- Pain Gaming
- Pain X

Minor champion (1)

- Tigers

=== Group stage ===
Group stage began from 9 to 10 November 2018.

Competing teams were divided into four groups of four teams (groups A to D). The winner of first two series (best of three) on each group would automatically go to Upper Bracket, and loser of first two series go to Lower Bracket. Last series would be a decider match for Upper Bracket or Lower Bracket.

Ivan Borislavov "Mind Control" stand-in for Ninjas in Pyjamas replacing Neta Shapira "33", due to problems with travel visa between Israel–Malaysia relations.

Group A
Pos	Team	W	L	
1	Team Secret	4	0	Advanced to the upper bracket
2	Ninjas in Pyjamas	2	1	Advanced to the upper bracket
3	Pain Gaming	2	5	Advanced to the lower bracket
4	J.Storm	1	4	Advanced to the lower bracket

Group B
Pos	Team	W	L	
1	Evil Geniuses	4	1	Advanced to the upper bracket
2	Vici Gaming	4	3	Advanced to the upper bracket
3	Team Aster	4	5	Advanced to the lower bracket
4	TNC Predator	1	4	Advanced to the lower bracket

Group C
Pos	Team	W	L	
1	PSG.LGD	4	0	Advanced to the upper bracket
2	Fnatic	4	2	Advanced to the upper bracket
3	Tigers	2	5	Advanced to the lower bracket
4	Gambit Esports	1	4	Advanced to the lower bracket

Group D
Pos	Team	W	L	
1	Virtus.pro	4	2	Advanced to the upper bracket
2	Alliance	5	4	Advanced to the upper bracket
3	Forward Gaming	4	4	Advanced to the lower bracket
4	Pain X	1	4	Advanced to the lower bracket

=== Main event ===
Main event was held from 11 to 18 November 2018.

It featured two brackets in a double-elimination tournament format. In the upper brackets, played to best-of-three, the winning team moved on, while the losing team would then be placed in respective rounds of the lower bracket. The winner of the upper bracket moved to the Grand Finals. The first round in the lower bracket was played as a best-of-one, with the loser being immediately eliminated. All other matches were best-of-three, with the winner of the lower bracket advancing to the Grand Finals, which was a best-of-five series, to face the winner of the upper bracket.

Upper bracket

UB Quarterfinals
A1	Team Secret	2
B2	Vici Gaming	0
C1	PSG.LGD	2
D2	Alliance	0
B1	Evil Geniuses	1
A2	Ninjas in Pyjamas	2
D1	Virtus.pro	2
C2	Fnatic	0

UB Semifinals
A1	Team Secret	2
C1	PSG.LGD	0
A2	Ninjas in Pyjamas	0
D1	Virtus.pro	2

UB Finals
A1	Team Secret	2
D1	Virtus.pro	1

Lower bracket

Round 1
A3	Pain Gaming	0
B4	TNC Predator	1
C3	Tigers	0
D4	Pain X	1

Round 2
D2	Alliance	0
B4	TNC Predator	2
B2	Vici Gaming	2
D4	Pain X	0

Round 3
B4	TNC Predator	2
B2	Vici Gaming	1

Round 1
B3	Team Aster	0
A4	J.Storm	1
D3	Forward Gaming	1
C4	Gambit Esports	0

Round 2
C2	Fnatic	2
A4	J.Storm	1
B1	Evil Geniuses	2
D3	Forward Gaming	1

Round 3
C2	Fnatic	0
B1	Evil Geniuses	2

Round 4
A2	Ninjas in Pyjamas	2
B4	TNC Predator	0
C1	PSG.LGD	0
B1	Evil Geniuses	2

Round 5
A2	Ninjas in Pyjamas	1
B1	Evil Geniuses	2

LB Finals
D1	Virtus.pro	2
B1	Evil Geniuses	0

Grand Finals

The grand finals took place between Virtus Pro, who advanced from the lower bracket, and Team Secret, who advanced from the upper bracket, with Virtus Pro defeating Team Secret 3–2 in a best-of-five series.

19 November 2018
14:00 MYT (UTC+8)
Team Secret
2-3
Virtus.pro
Axiata Arena, Malaysia

- Game 2
- Game 3

- Game 1
- Game 4
- Game 5
