= 2019 League of Legends Rift Rivals =

E-sports tournament

Rift Rivals 2019
Tournament information
- Sport: League of Legends
- Location: (United States) Los Angeles (South Korea) Seoul
- Date: LCS/LEC; 27–29 June 2019; LCK/LPL/LMS-VCS; 4–7 July 2019
- Administrator: Riot Games
- Host: Riot Games
- Venue(s): (United States) LCS Studio (South Korea) Jangchung Arena
- Participants: (United States) Top 3 teams of Spring Split from LCS and LEC (South Korea) Top 4 teams of Spring Split from LCK, LPL and LMS-VCS

Final positions
- Champions: Europe (LEC); South Korea (LCK)
- 1st runner-up: North America (LCS); China (LPL)
- 2nd runner-up: Taiwan/Hong Kong/Macau-Vietnam (LMS-VCS)

The 2019 League of Legends Rift Rivals was the third Rift Rivals – a series of cross-regional League of Legends tournaments organised by Riot Games. The tournament was held on 27–29 June 2019 in Los Angeles for the North America and Europe region, and 4–7 July 2019 in Seoul for China, South Korea, Taiwan/Hong Kong/Macau and Vietnam region. The Taiwan/Hong Kong/Macau region and Vietnam region sent their top two teams for Spring season to Rift Rivals 2019 respectively.

Riot Games had discontinued the Rift Rivals event for play-in region this year.

== Format ==
=== LCS/LEC ===
- Participants: Top three teams from each region
- Group Stage
  - Single Round Robin best of one
- Finals
  - Best of five relay race

=== LCK/LPL/LMS-VCS ===
- Participants: Top four teams from each region
  - LMS-VCS is treated as a single region, each region sends their top two teams for the tournament
- Group Stage
  - Best of one
  - Each win will attribute to the team's home region
  - Top region advances to the finals
- Semifinals
  - Best of five
  - Each region decides their order for competing
  - Winner will advance to the finals
- Finals
  - Best of five
  - Each region decides their order for competing

== Blue Rift (LCS/LEC) ==
The 2019 Rift Rival between North America (LCS) - Europe (LEC) featured the top three teams from each region's Spring Split. This event took place in Los Angeles.

- Start date: 27 June 2019
- End date: 29 June 2019
- Patch: 9.12

Participant teams
LCS	LEC
Team Liquid	G2 Esports
Team SoloMid	Origen
Cloud9	Fnatic

Group Stage
Rank	LCS			Rank	LEC		
1	Team Liquid	2	1	1	G2 Esports	2	1
2	Team SoloMid	1	2	1	Origen	2	1
3	Cloud9	0	3	1	Fnatic	2	1

Finals
LCS	1	3	LEC
Cloud9	0	1	Fnatic
Team SoloMid	0	1	Origen
Team Liquid	1	0	G2 Esports
Team SoloMid	0	1	Fnatic

== Red Rift (LCK/LPL/LMS-VCS) ==
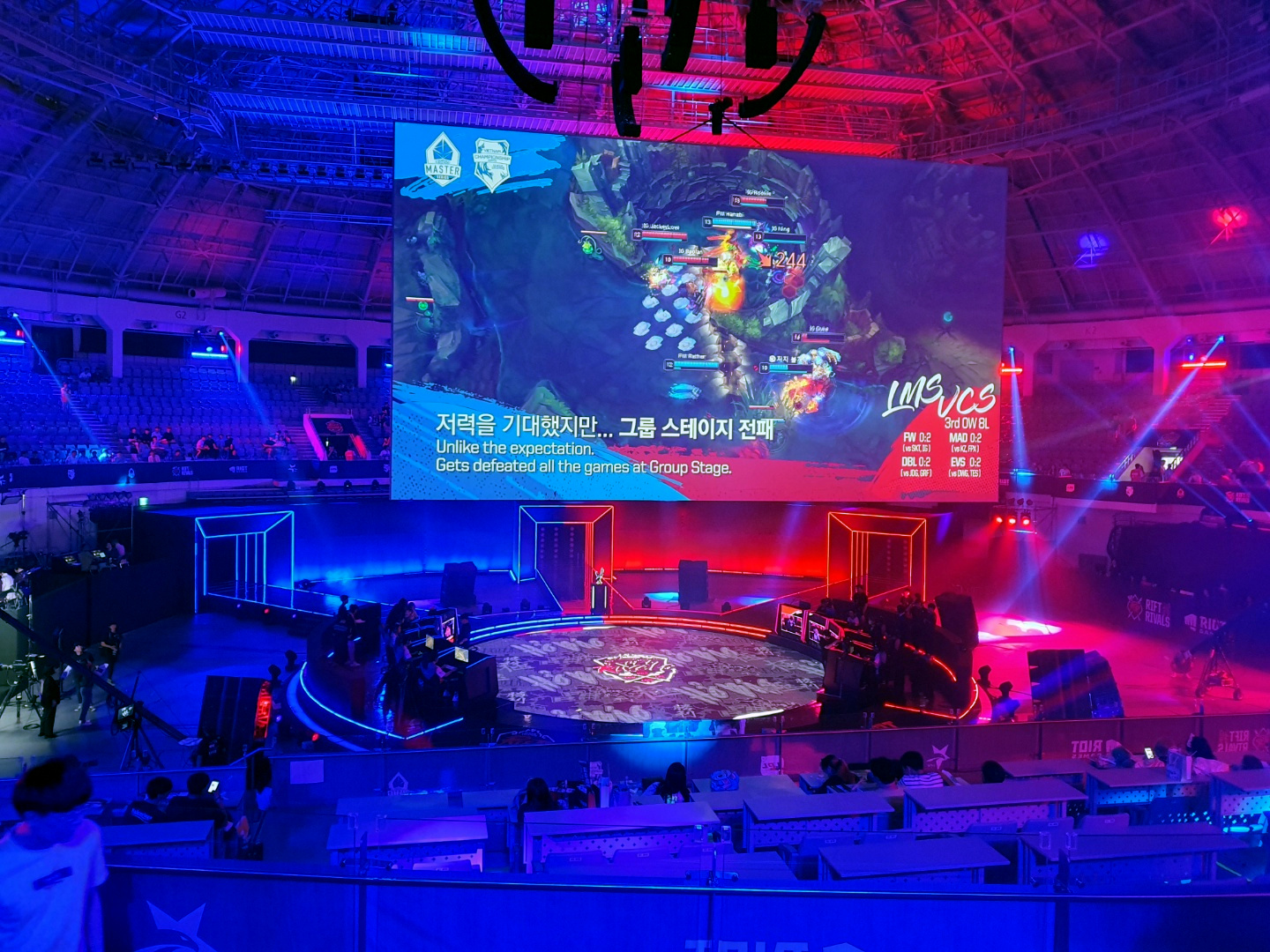
Stage at Jangchung Arena for the 2019 Rift Rivals

The 2019 Rift Rival between South Korea (LCK) - China (LPL) - Taiwan/Hong Kong/Macau-Vietnam (LMS-VCS) featured the top four Spring Split teams from each region, except for LMS-VCS which featured the top two Spring Split teams from each region. This event took place in Seoul.

- Start date: 4 July 2019
- End date: 7 July 2019
- Patch: 9.13 (Mordekaiser and Qiyana disabled)

Participant teams
Seed	LCK	LPL	LMS-VCS
1	SK Telecom T1	Invictus Gaming	Flash Wolves
2	Griffin	JD Gaming	MAD Team
3	KING-ZONE DragonX	FunPlus Phoenix	Dashing Buffalo
4	DAMWON Gaming	Top Esports	EVOS Esports

Group Stage
Seed	LCK			LPL			LMS-VCS		
1	SK Telecom	1	1	Invictus Gaming	2	0	Flash Wolves	0	2
2	Griffin	2	0	JD Gaming	1	1	MAD Team	0	2
3	KING-ZONE DragonX	2	0	FunPlus Phoenix	1	1	Dashing Buffalo	0	2
4	DAMWON Gaming	2	0	Top Esports	1	1	EVOS Esports	0	2

Semifinal			Final
			1	LCK	3
2	LMS-VCS	0		LPL	1
3	LPL	3

Semifinals
Game	LPL	3	0	LMS-VCS
1	JD Gaming	1	0	Flash Wolves
2	Top Esports	1	0	MAD Team
3	FunPlus Phoenix	1	0	Dashing Buffalo

Finals
Game	LCK	3	1	LPL
1	KING-ZONE DragonX	1	0	Invictus Gaming
2	SK Telecom T1	1	0	Top Esports
3	Griffin	0	1	FunPlus Phoenix
4	DAMWON Gaming	1	0	JD Gaming
