= Blue Mars (video game) =

- Developer: Avatar Reality
- Designer: Kaz Hashimoto
- Engine: CryEngine 2
- Platforms: Microsoft Windows, iOS
- Release: September 2, 2009 (open beta)
- Genres: Virtual world, MMOG
- Mode: Multiplayer

Blue Mars, a 3D massively multiplayer virtual world platform developed by Hawaii-based Avatar Reality, allows 3rd parties to create virtual worlds, MMOG games, simulations, shops, businesses, entertainment venues, clothing, custom avatars, furniture, virtual homes, and other items. It consists of four main parts: the client software, the Sandbox Editor SDK suite, the website, and the host servers. It is often compared to Second Life, since both are virtual social worlds allowing user-created content. According to Jim Sink, CEO of Avatar Reality, "Blue Mars was inspired by a vision of the future when the power to terraform whole worlds is within our grasp. The name Blue Mars represents possibility and hope."

== Platform and technology ==
The editor suite is a free download after upgrading to a developer account. It currently consists of nine editors with specialized purposes (Animation, Block, Body, City, Cloth, Furniture, Interior, Item, and Shop), a developer version of the client software for testing, and reference and sample data.

Both the client software and Editor suite utilize the CryEngine 2 rendering engine originally developed by Crytek. The video game Crysis also runs on CryEngine 2. The graphics engine is being modified by Avatar Reality, and features not part of a combat game but needed for a virtual world are being added. Content can be created on many 3rd party 3D and graphics programs so long as they can output a COLLADA interchange file format 3D model or TIFF or Direct Draw Surface image formats. They are then converted to CryEngine native .cgf and .dds formats as needed via the provided development tools.

The host servers deliver city data files, individual item and avatar files, and player interaction and updates when logged in. Currently in the demonstration stage is a "Fusion Render Cloud" system with remote rendering for devices without adequate graphics cards, and without the need for a client download and installation.

== Gameplay ==
The game takes place in 2177 on a terraformed Mars.

Avatars can freely move around in locations known as "cities" (similar to "islands" in Second Life), and interact with scripted objects and other avatars. Each location may have custom features added by the city designer for entertainment, game, shopping, business or other uses. Internal "Blue Mars Dollars" are used for shopping and rentals. They can be bought with real money, earned within Blue Mars, and cashed out by developers via PayPal.

== Development history ==
June 2009 – Avatar Reality started closed beta testing.

September 2, 2009 – Reached "open beta" status, with version 0.5822.

December 17, 2009 – version 0.6589 of the beta software was released. This version added a "places browser", which allows selective downloading of city data, and Flash functionality within the player client. At the same time the website was revamped, new cities opened, and pricing was announced for city hosting.

February 18, 2010 – version 0.7470 was released. This version added a "Body Editor" to create custom Avatars.

April 5, 2010 – version 0.8237 was released. This version added custom hair creation, and improved chat features in the client software. The "world" at this point consists of 15 visitable cities with a small number of activities and working shops.

The development roadmap plans release of more features incrementally. on roughly a six-week cycle.

March 5, 2012 – Ball State University is granted research and development rights to "operate Blue Mars for noncommercial purposes, expand upon the source code, increase its research and academic initiatives, and enhance the community of Blue Mars."

== User statistics ==
As of November 2010, there are approximately 3500 registered users on their beta forums, and approximately 330 developers who are creating cities, games 3D environments, and individual items for Blue Mars. Most of these developers are individuals, small groups or indie game developers. Developer registration is free as is the developer kit, although some external 3D graphics software may require purchase.

== Reception ==
Nalates' Things & Stuff Blog noted that registering as a Blue Mars content developer is relatively easy, but creating the content is not so easy, particularly compared to Second Life.

Game designer Raph Koster complimented the graphics and user interface of Blue Mars and compared the business model to that of the There virtual world.
