= Snax (gamer) =

Polish esports player (born 1993)

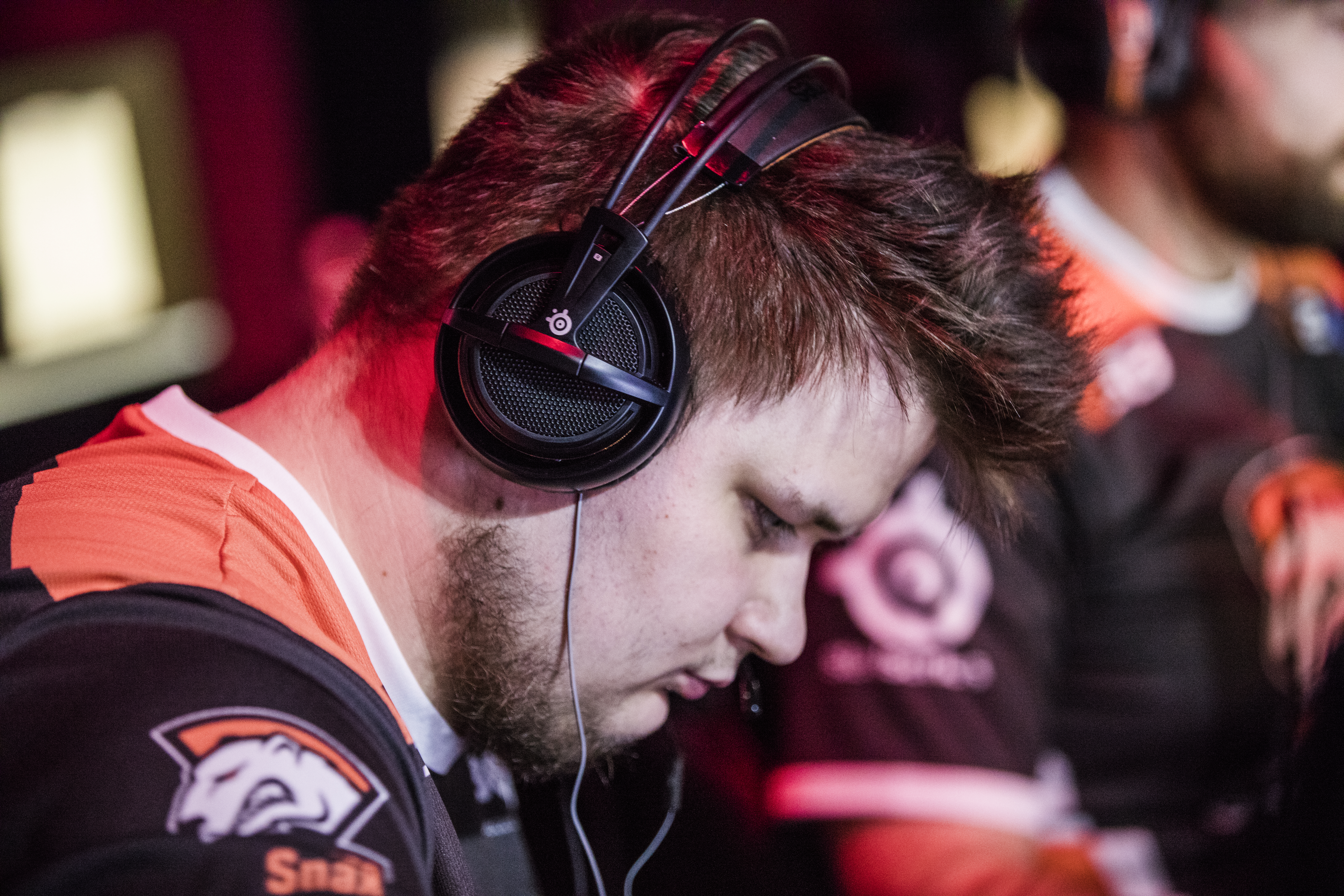
- Snax playing for Virtus.pro in 2016

Personal information
- Born: July 5, 1993 (age 33); Kraków, Poland
- Nationality: Polish

Current team
- Team: GamerLegion
- Role: Rifler (in-game leader)
- Game(s): Counter-Strike; Counter-Strike: Global Offensive; Counter-Strike 2

Career information
- Playing career: 2010–present

Team history
- 2013: GF-Gaming
- 2013: ESC
- 2013: UniversalSoldiers
- 2013–2014: AGAIN
- 2014–2018: Virtus.pro
- 2018: mousesports
- 2018–2020: Virtus.pro
- 2020–2021: Illuminar
- 2021: Anonymo
- 2022: MONKE
- 2022–2023: ex-Finest
- 2023: Let us cook
- 2023: Pompa
- 2023–2024: GamerLegion
- 2024–2025: G2 Esports
- 2025–present: GamerLegion

Career highlights and awards
- 1x Major winner (EMS One Katowice 2014); 7× HLTV MVP; 6x HLTV EVP

Janusz Pogorzelski (born July 5, 1993), also known professionally as "Snax", is a Polish professional esports player.

== Individual awards and accolades ==
Rankings

- HLTV Top 20 Players: 4th (2014)
- HLTV Top 20 Players: 4th (2015)
- HLTV Top 20 Players: 5th (2016)
- HLTV Top 20 Players: 20th (2017)

MVP

- Gfinity 3
- ESEA Season 18: Global Finals.
- ESL ESEA Pro League Invitational
- CEVO Season 8 Professional
- StarLadder i-League Invitational #1
- ELEAGUE Season 1
- DreamHack Masters Las Vegas 2017

== Notable tournament wins ==
Placement	Tournament	Location	Date
With AGAiN
1st place, gold medalist(s)	SLTV StarSeries VIII Finals	Kyiv, Ukraine	Dec 20th - Dec 22nd 2013
With Virtus pro
1st place, gold medalist(s)	EMS One Katowice 2014	Katowice, Poland	Mar 13th - Mar 16th 2014
1st place, gold medalist(s)	Gfinity 3	London, United Kingdom	Aug 2nd - Aug 3rd 2014
1st place, gold medalist(s)	Copenhagen Games 2015	Copenhagen, Denmark	Apr 2nd - Apr 4th 2015
1st place, gold medalist(s)	ESEA Invite Season 18 Global Finals	Dallas, United States	Apr 17th - Apr 19th 2015
1st place, gold medalist(s)	CEVO Professional Season 7 Finals	Columbus, United States	Jul 24th - Jul 26th 2015
1st place, gold medalist(s)	ESL ESEA Dubai Invitational 2015	Dubai, United Arab Emirates	Sep 10th - Sep 12th 2015
1st place, gold medalist(s)	CEVO Professional Season 8 Finals	Columbus, United States	Nov 6th - Nov 8th 2015
1st place, gold medalist(s)	SL i-League Invitational #1	Kyiv, Ukraine	May 19–22, 2016
1st place, gold medalist(s)	ELEAGUE Season 1	Atlanta, United States	May 24 - Jul 30th 2016
1st place, gold medalist(s)	DreamHack ZOWIE Open Bucharest 2016	Bucharest, Romania	Sep 16th - Sep 18th 2016
1st place, gold medalist(s)	DreamHack Masters Las Vegas 2017	Las Vegas, United States	Feb 15th - Feb 19th 2017
With MOUZ(Mousesports)
1st place, gold medalist(s)	ESL One New York 2018	Brooklyn, United States	Sep 26th - Sep 30th 2018
With G2 Esports
1st place, gold medalist(s)	BLAST Premier Fall Final 2024	Copenhagen, Denmark	Sep 25th - Sep 29th 2024
1st place, gold medalist(s)	BLAST Premier World Final 2024	Sentosa, Singapore	Oct 30th - Nov 3rd 2024
