= Crytek =

German video game and software company

Crytek GmbH
- Type: Private
- Industry: Video games
- Founded: September 1999; 27 years ago, in Coburg, Germany
- Founders: Cevat Yerli; Avni Yerli; Faruk Yerli
- Headquarters: Frankfurt, Germany
- Key people: Avni Yerli (co-CEO); Faruk Yerli (co-CEO)
- Products: CryEngine; Far Cry; Crysis series; Warface; Hunt: Showdown
- Owner: Yerli family
- Number of employees: 405 (2024)
- Subsidiaries: List of Crytek subsidiaries
- Website: crytek.com

Crytek GmbH is a German video game developer and software developer based in Frankfurt. Founded by the Yerli brothers in Coburg in 1999 and moved to Frankfurt in 2006, it operates additional studios in Kyiv, Ukraine and Istanbul, Turkey. Crytek is best known for developing the first entry of the Far Cry series, the Crysis series, and the open world nature of its games which showcase the company's CryEngine.

Crytek's former studios included Crytek Black Sea in Sofia, Bulgaria, Crytek UK in Nottingham, and Crytek USA in Austin, Texas. As of August 2024, Crytek is the largest game developer in Germany with 405 employees.

== History ==
Crytek's previous logo, used until 2018

=== 1999–2004: CryEngine and Far Cry ===
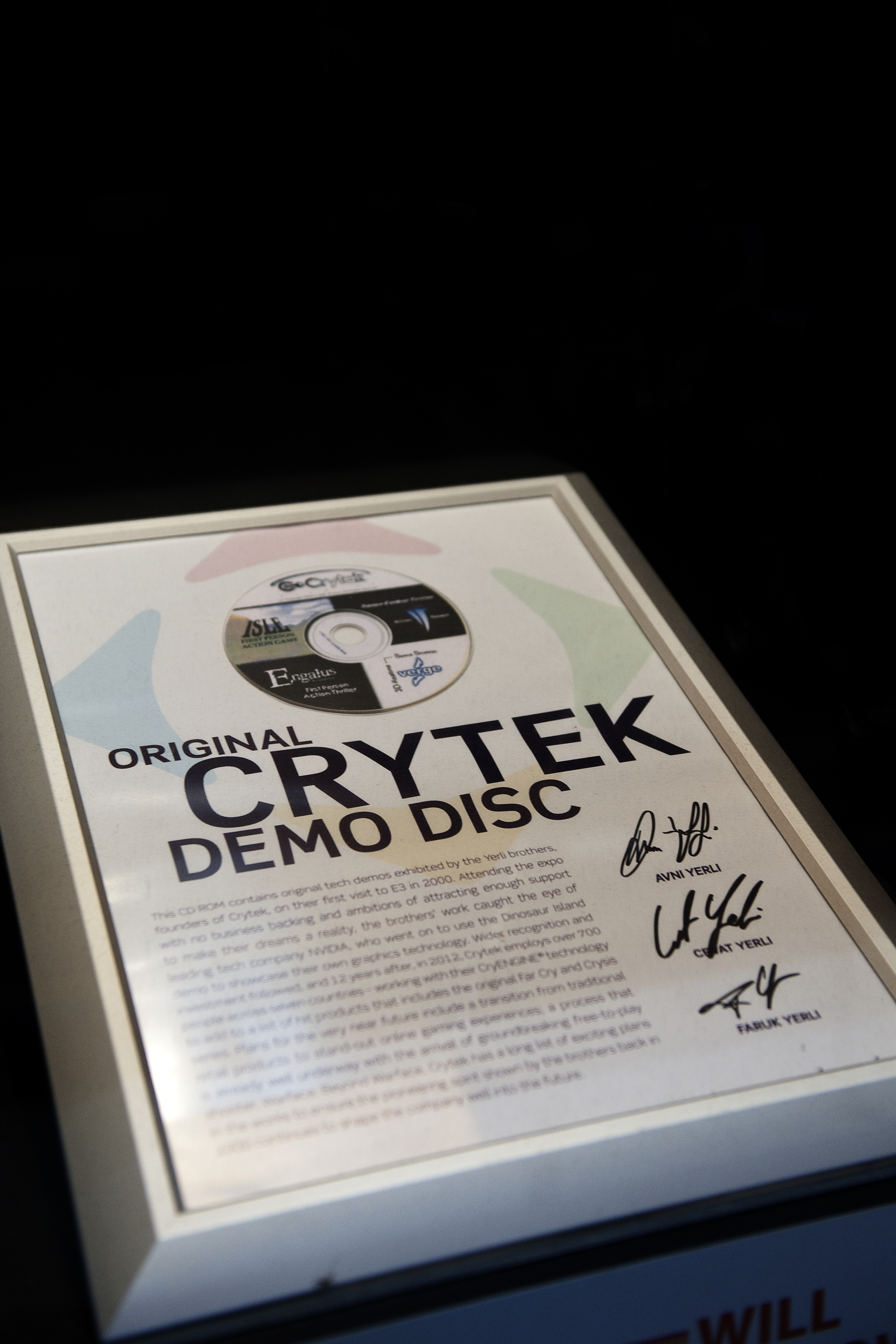
The E3 2000 Crytek demo disk

Crytek was founded by the Turkish-German brothers Cevat, Avni and Faruk Yerli in September 1999 in Coburg, Germany. One of its first projects was a tech demo of a game called X-Isle: Dinosaur Island, which showcased its game engine technology that offered larger viewing distances than other game engines could at that time. They met with Nvidia during the 1999 Electronic Entertainment Expo (E3) where its tech demo caught the attention of Nvidia and various media groups. Crytek later signed on with Nvidia to distribute X-Isle as benchmarking software for Nvidia cards.

Crytek's first major game project was Engalus, a first-person shooter with a cyberpunk theme and role-playing elements, which was first privately shown at E3 2000. The project first attracted publicity for the company at the 2000 ECTS with their tech demo at the Nvidia booth, but was subsequently cancelled. Crytek was approached by Ubisoft to develop X-Isle into a full AAA game. This evolved into Far Cry, which was released in March 2004. Concurrently, Crytek announced its licensable game engine, CryEngine, that was used for X-Isle and Far Cry.

In February 2004, German police carried out a morning raid on Crytek offices, acting on an ex-intern's claim that Crytek was using software illegally. The police investigated for software copies greater than licences purchased, but no charges were pressed. That same month, Crytek and Electronic Arts (EA) announced a strategic partnership to develop a new gaming franchise based on the CryEngine, which would eventually be the Crysis series. Crytek chose this path to highlight that the CryEngine was not limited to just what Far Cry had shown. Due to this partnership, Ubisoft acquired the full rights to the Far Cry franchise by 2006 as well as a perpetual licence to the first CryEngine, which they have since adapted into their own Dunia Engine. In December 2004, Crytek and ATI created a special cinematic machinima to demonstrate the future of PC gaming.

=== 2004–2014: Company expansion, CryEngine 2 and 3, and later games ===
In January 2006, Crytek announced the development of Crysis, promising that it would be an original first-person shooter with a new kind of gameplay challenge requiring "adaptive tactics". The game later won several Best PC Game awards from E3 and Games Convention. In April 2006, Crytek moved to new offices in Frankfurt. The first public demonstration of Crytek's CryEngine 2 was in January 2007, one year after Crysis was announced. It has been licensed by many companies such as Avatar Reality, WeMade Entertainment, Entropia Universe, XLGames, Reloaded Studios.

On 11 May 2006, Crytek announced that its satellite studio in Kyiv, Ukraine, had been upgraded to a full development studio, giving the company its second development studio. About a week after the upgrade of the Kyiv studio, Crytek announced a new studio in Budapest, Hungary.

Crysis was released in November 2007. In September 2008, an expansion to Crysis entitled Crysis Warhead was released as a PC-exclusive game. In October 2011, Crysis was released on PS3 and Xbox 360, allowing play of the original game via Xbox Live and the PlayStation Network.

On 14 July 2008, Crytek bought Black Sea Studios and renamed it to Crytek Black Sea. On 17 November 2008, Crytek opened an office in South Korea named Crytek, Ltd. On 3 February 2009, Crytek purchased Free Radical Design, a British video game company known for the TimeSplitters series, and renamed the company to Crytek UK.

In March 2009, Crytek announced on the company's website that it would introduce CryEngine 3 at the 2009 Game Developers Conference. This new engine was developed for use on PlayStation 3, Xbox 360 and PCs. In October 2009, CryEngine 3 became available in trade flow for game developers. In March 2010, CryEngine 3 was made compatible with stereoscopic 3D technology. Crytek released Crysis 2, a direct sequel to the original game, in March 2011.

At E3 2011, Crytek exhibited several new projects, including the action game Ryse: Son of Rome. In September 2011, THQ and Crytek announced a partnership to develop Homefront 2. After THQ filed for bankruptcy, Crytek acquired the Homefront franchise from THQ entirely in January 2013. In February 2012, Crytek announced a new cloud based social gaming network called Gface. The service is designed to help users meet people and play multiplayer video games with friends. Crytek began researching a cloud gaming system in 2005 for Crysis, but paused development in 2007.

In April 2012, Crytek released the CryEngine 3.4 SDK which brought full DirectX 11 support to the CryEngine SDK. Crytek released Crysis 3 in February 2013 and Ryse: Son of Rome in November 2013 as an Xbox One launch title. The PC version of Ryse was released in October 2014.

On 17 January 2013, Crytek officially opened an office in Istanbul, Turkey. On 28 January 2013, Crytek opened a new studio, Crytek USA, in Austin, Texas, consisting primarily of former Vigil Games employees.

=== Since 2014: Restructuring, new leadership, CryEngine V, and latest games ===
In June 2014, reports surfaced that Crytek had missed wage payments and withheld bonuses for Crytek UK and Crytek USA employees, and the company responded that it was in a "transitional phase" as it secured capital for future projects, with a particular emphasis on online gaming. In July 2014, Crytek announced a strategic deal where the rights to Homefront including Homefront: The Revolution and the Crytek UK staff were transferred to Koch Media. The team continued its work on the game as the new Deep Silver Dambuster Studios. Crytek USA was restructured to remain an engine support team while development of Hunt: Horrors of the Gilded Age was transferred to Crytek.

Crytek announced the next iteration of the engine branded CRYENGINE V on 22 March 2016.

On 20 December 2016, Crytek announced that its studios in Hungary, Bulgaria, South Korea, Turkey and China would be shut down. However, Crytek sold Crytek Black Sea to Sega and The Creative Assembly in March 2017 and stated to retained offices in Istanbul to operate Warface in Turkey in 2018. In December 2017, Crytek announced a partnership with new cryptocurrency CryCash for use in rewarding gamers and esports betting; an initial coin offering was planned that month. On 28 February 2018, Crytek announced that Cevat Yerli was stepping down as chief executive officer (CEO) of Crytek, with his brothers, Avni and Faruk Yerli, taking over the company's leadership as joint CEOs. Cevat continues to support the company as an advisor and major shareholder.

Crytek released Hunt: Showdown (utilising the fifth generation of the CryEngine) in 2019–20. The company has also worked on three virtual reality projects, namely The Climb for the Oculus Rift, The Climb 2 for the Oculus Rift and Oculus Quest 2, and Robinson: The Journey for the PlayStation VR, Oculus Rift and SteamVR. Arena of Fate was cancelled after Crytek's restructuring which saw the game's developer Crytek Black Sea sold. In February 2019, Warface's development team split from Crytek Kiev and formed Blackwood Games to continue working on the game.

In July 2021, German tabloid BILD reported that the Chinese Internet company Tencent was attempting to buy Crytek for over €300 million via a European subsidiary.

In 2021, the Creative Services team responsible for creating trailers won a Gold MUSE Award for The Dark Sight Trailer that promoted Hunt: Showdown.

On 26 January 2022, Crytek announced the fourth entry of the Crysis franchise, but the game was put on hold in 2025 followed by another round of layoffs.

== Subsidiaries ==
- Crytek Kiev in Kyiv, Ukraine — founded in 2006.
- Crytek Istanbul in Istanbul, Turkey — founded in 2012.

=== Former ===
- Crytek Black Sea in Sofia, Bulgaria — founded in 2001 as Black Sea Studios; acquired and renamed in 2008; sold to Sega in 2017.
- Crytek Budapest in Budapest, Hungary — founded in 2007, closed in 2016.
- Crytek Seoul in Seoul, South Korea — founded in 2008, closed in 2016.
- Crytek Shanghai in Shanghai, China — founded in 2012, closed in 2016.
- Crytek UK in Nottingham, England — founded in 1999 as Free Radical Design; acquired and renamed in 2009; sold to Deep Silver in 2014.
- Crytek USA in Austin, Texas, U.S. — founded in 2013, closed in 2014.

== Games developed ==
Year	Title	Publisher(s)	Platform(s)	Studio(s)
2004	Far Cry	Ubisoft	Microsoft Windows	Crytek
2007	Crysis	Electronic Arts	Microsoft Windows, PlayStation 3, Xbox 360	Crytek
2008	Crysis Warhead	Electronic Arts	Microsoft Windows	Crytek Budapest
2011	Crysis 2	Electronic Arts	Microsoft Windows, PlayStation 3, Xbox 360	Crytek, Crytek UK
2012	Fibble: Flick 'n' Roll	Crytek	Android, iOS	Crytek Budapest
2013	Crysis 3	Electronic Arts	Microsoft Windows, PlayStation 3, Xbox 360	Crytek, Crytek UK
2013	Warface	Microsoft Studios, Crytek	Microsoft Windows, PlayStation 4, Xbox 360, Xbox One, Nintendo Switch	Crytek Kiev
2013	Ryse: Son of Rome	Microsoft Studios, Crytek	Microsoft Windows, Xbox One	Crytek
2014	The Collectables	DeNA	iOS	Crytek Budapest
2016	The Climb	Crytek	Microsoft Windows, Oculus Quest (2019)	Crytek
2016	Robinson: The Journey	Crytek	Microsoft Windows, PlayStation 4	Crytek
2019	Hunt: Showdown	Crytek	Microsoft Windows, PlayStation 4, Xbox One	Crytek
2020	Crysis Remastered	Crytek	Microsoft Windows, Nintendo Switch, PlayStation 4, Xbox One	Crytek
2020	The Climb 2	Crytek	Oculus Quest, Oculus Quest 2	Crytek
2021	Crysis 2 Remastered	Crytek	Microsoft Windows, Nintendo Switch, PlayStation 4, Xbox One	Crytek
2021	Crysis 3 Remastered	Crytek	Microsoft Windows, Nintendo Switch, PlayStation 4, Xbox One	Crytek
TBA	Crysis 4	Crytek	—N/a	Crytek

=== Cancelled games ===
- Engalus
- Arena of Fate
