= ESL One Hamburg 2017 =

Dota 2 tournament

Tournament information
- Sport: Dota 2
- Location: Hamburg, Germany
- Dates: October 26–29, 2017
- Administrator: ESL
- Tournament format(s): Group stage Double elimination Main event Single elimination
- Host(s): ESL
- Venue(s): Barclaycard Arena
- Participants: 8 teams
- Purse: US$ 1,000,000

Final positions
- Champions: Virtus.pro
- Runner-up: Team Secret

Tournament statistics
- Matches played: 13
- Attendance: 10,000 (769 per match)
- MVP: Alexei "Solo" Berezin
- Pro Circuit Points: 1500

ESL One Hamburg 2017 was a Dota 2 esports championship tournament hosted by ESL. It took place in Hamburg, Germany in October 2017. This is the first ESL One event held in Hamburg, after three previous ESL One events in Germany were held in Frankfurt. In accordance with the new Dota 2 competitive season format set by Valve, the game's developer, the tournament will be the first Dota 2 Major tournament of the 2017 Dota Pro Circuit season.

The tournament involved eight teams, which included two directly invited teams and six teams each from the Chinese, Commonwealth of Independent States (CIS), European, North American, South American, and Southeast Asian qualifying regions.

In the finals, Virtus.pro defeated Team Secret 2–0 to win the tournament and claim their first major trophy. Virtus.pro also became the first team to win a Dota 2 major tournament of the 2017 Dota Pro Circuit season. The 3rd place of the tournament was secured by The International 2017 champions and runners-up Team Liquid and Newbee.

== Background ==
Dota 2 is a multiplayer online battle arena video game (MOBA) developed by the Valve. In it, two teams of five players compete by selecting pre-designed in-game hero characters, each with a variety of innate skills and deploy-able powers, and cooperating together to destroy the base of the other team before their own base is destroyed as to win the round. The game is played from a top-down perspective, and the player sees a segment of the game's map near their character as well as mini-map that shows their allies as well as any enemies revealed outside the fog of war. The game's map has three symmetric "lanes" between each base, with a number of automated defense turrets protecting each side. Periodically, the team's base will spawn an army of weak non-playable minions that will march down one lane towards the opponents' base, fighting any enemy hero, minion, or structure they encounter. If a hero character is killed, that character will respawn back at their base after a delay period, which gets progressively longer the farther into the match. The game is a free-to-play, but financially supported by Valve with a variety of microtransactions such as cosmetic items for its heroes. The tournament will also include a cosplay competition with a prize pool of $3,000, which will take place on October 28, 2017.

== Teams ==
The tournament involved 2 directly invited teams and 6 regional qualifier winners. This was the first time a South American Dota 2 team participates in an ESL event. On September 13, 2017, ESL announced that Team Liquid and Newbee, the winners and runners-up respectively of The International 2017, were invited to the tournament. The regional qualifiers took place in six qualifying regions: China, CIS, Europe, North America, South America and Southeast Asia, from September 16–24, 2017. Each qualifier used single-elimination format and consisted of two phases, the open qualifier and closed qualifier. The open qualifier used best-of-one format and will have four teams qualified to the closed qualifier. The closed qualifier consisted of 12 teams, where eight teams are directly invited and four qualified teams from the open qualifier. The top four teams will have a bye in round 1. All matches except the grand final used best-of-three format, while the grand final used best-of-five format.

Teams	Qualified as
Team Liquid	Direct invitee
Newbee	Direct invitee
Keen Gaming	Chinese regional qualifier winner
Virtus.pro	CIS regional qualifier winner
Team Secret	European regional qualifier winner
Evil Geniuses	North American regional qualifier winner
SG e-sports	South American regional qualifier winner
Fnatic	Southeast Asian wildcard (Note: Southeast Asian regional qualifier Happy Feet from the Philippines was unable to participate due to visa issues. ESL decided to replace Happy Feet with Fnatic)

== Venue ==
The main event of the tournament will take place at Barclaycard Arena, a multipurpose arena with a total capacity of 16,000 seat, located at Altona borough of Hamburg, Germany. It was the former home arena of Handball Hamburg & Hamburg Freezers. The arena was chosen by ESL due to weather and seasonal consideration.

== Format ==
The group matches used double elimination format, while the playoffs used single elimination format. 8 participating teams were divided between 2 groups of four. The first two matches of each group used the best-of-one format, while the rest of the tournament used the best-of-three format. The losers of the first two matches of each group move to the lower bracket and face each other, while the winners will face each other to take the first playoff seed. The second playoff seed is determined by a match between the lower bracket winner and the upper bracket loser.

== Results ==
=== Group stage ===
Group A

First Round
Newbee	1
Fnatic	0
Winner's bracket
Evil Geniuses	0
Team Secret	1
Fnatic	0
Evil Geniuses	2
Loser's bracket

Second Round
Newbee	1
Team Secret	2
Newbee	2
Evil Geniuses	1

Group B

First Round
Team Liquid	1
SG e-sports	0
Winner's bracket
Virtus.pro	1
Keen Gaming	0
SG e-sports	1
Keen Gaming	2
Loser's bracket

Second Round
Team Liquid	1
Virtus.pro	2
Team Liquid	2
Keen Gaming	0

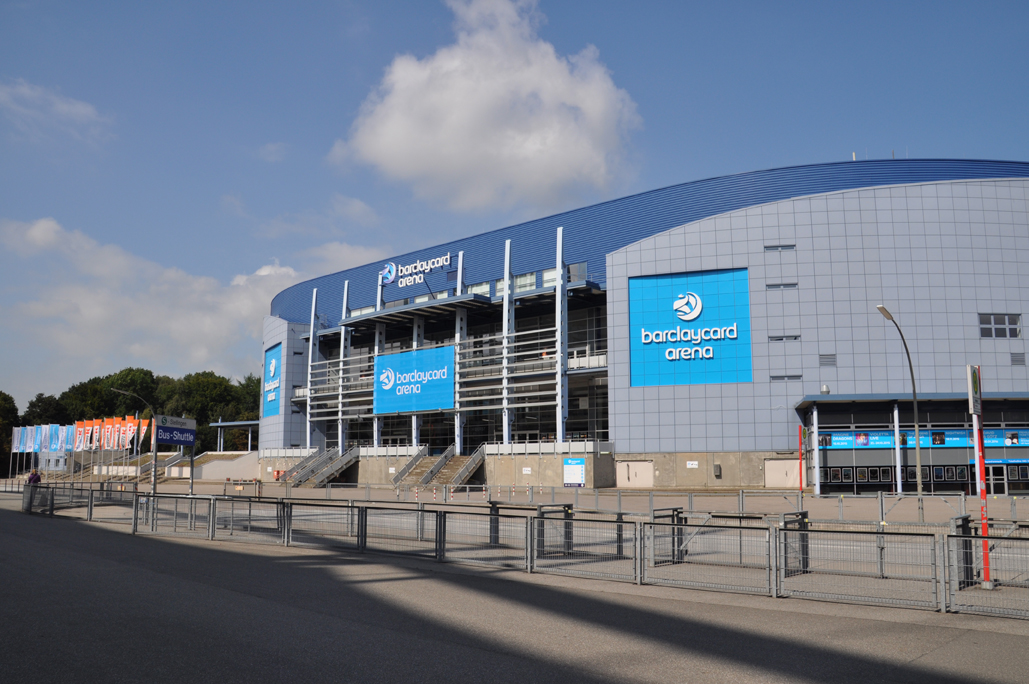
Barclaycard Arena in Hamburg, Germany was the venue of the tournament

=== Playoffs ===
Semi-finals
October 29, 2017
Newbee	1
Virtus.pro	2
October 29, 2017
Team Liquid	1
Team Secret	2

Grand finals
October 29, 2017
Virtus.pro	2
Team Secret	0

=== Grand finals ===
October 29, 2017; 20:11 CET	Report	Virtus.pro	2–0	Team Secret	Barclaycard Arena, Hamburg; Attendance: 10,000
Score by game:
Virtus.pro won game 1	33–18
Virtus.pro won game 2	38–22

Virtus.pro became champions of the tournament after defeated Team Secret 2–0 in the grand finals. It is the first Valve Major trophy for Virtus.pro, after their best result in Dota 2 Major tournaments was the runners-up at Kiev Major. As champions, they received US$500,000 prize money and 750 pro circuit points, while the runners-up Team Secret received US$200,000 and 450 points. Virtus.pro player Alexei "Solo" Berezin" was chosen via online and jury voting as the MVP of the tournament, earned him a car prize from Mercedes-Benz as the main sponsor of the tournament.

== Winnings ==
The total prize money for the tournament was confirmed by ESL as US$1,000,000. The champions and runners-up were rewarded US$500,000 and US$200,000, respectively. As per regulations set by Valve, 50% of the allocated pro circuit points went to the champions, 30% to the runners-up and 10% to the semi-finalists.

Place	Team	Prize money	Pro circuit points
1st	Virtus.pro	US$500,000	750
2nd	Team Secret	US$200,000	450
3rd	Newbee	US$90,000	150
3rd	Team Liquid	US$90,000	150
5th	Evil Geniuses	US$40,000	0
5th	Keen Gaming	US$40,000	0
7th	Fnatic	US$20,000	0
7th	SG e-sports	US$20,000	0

== Marketing ==
ESL announced the tournament for the first time on their official website and YouTube channel in February 2017. In April 2017, ESL posted a humorous promotional video in their YouTube channel regarding the tournament, with narrating voice resembles Donald Trump. Before the tournament, ESL entered a global partnership with Intel and Mercedes-Benz, in which Intel will become technical partners for all tournaments administrated by ESL, while Mercedes-Benz will sponsor several ESL tournaments, starting with ESL One Hamburg 2017. Betting on Dota 2 Tournaments

== Media ==
The tournament was broadcast via Dota 2's built-in spectating client, as well as via ESL official live streams on ESL TV and ESL Twitch channel. More than 6 million people watched the tournament online, with average concurrent viewership exceeded 1.5 million.
