= Avatar Reality =

- Company type: Inc.
- Industry: Video games
- Founded: 2006
- Headquarters: Honolulu, Hawaii
- Key people: Henk B. Rogers, Kazuyuki Hashimoto
- Products: Blue Mars

Avatar Reality is a Honolulu-based game studio founded by Henk B. Rogers and Kazuyuki Hashimoto in December 2006. They develop an advanced virtual realm platform aimed at bringing together individuals worldwide on a grandiose level. Rogers with Alexy Pajitnov is known for creating Tetris and introducing it to the world and especially to US markets, and Kazuyuki is best known for developing the game Final Fantasy VII and the film Final Fantasy: The Spirits Within. Avatar Reality is one of FiReStarter companies at the 2009 Future In Review Conference. Minoru Arakawa, former CEO of Nintendo of America, is an advisor to the company. The company is led by CEO Jim Sink.

In 2010 the company announced a 4.2 million dollar investment.

Currently the company is working on Crytek's middleware CryEngine 2-based game Blue Mars. Avatar Reality's goal is to create a next-generation platform for high definition interactive 3D content. Similar to other 3D worlds like EVE Online, the Blue Mars platform will be able to support thousands of simultaneous users per region by using shared servers, capable of handling 10,000 users each.

In March 2009, the firm released the SDK for its game content developers. It also added partners for the 3D party content developing program – Virtual Space Entertainment (VSE) and e Frontier, which will create homes and 3D models.
