= Fibble =

2012 video game

- Developer: Crytek Budapest
- Publisher: Crytek
- Engine: CryEngine 3
- Platforms: iOS; Android (Amazon Appstore)
- Release: iOS: 29 March 2012; Android: 2012
- Genre: Puzzle
- Mode: Single-player

Fibble: Flick 'n' Roll a puzzle video game by Crytek, released for iOS and Android (Amazon Appstore) in 2012.

== Gameplay ==
Fibble is a puzzle video game with physics-based gameplay mechanics. The player controls the alien blob-like character Fibble by flicking, controlling angle and power of the move.

== Development ==
Fibble was concepted by Cevat Yerli, who is credited as executive producer. On 5 March 2012, Fibble was announced as Crytek's first mobile game using CryEngine 3 and integration into Crytek partnered GFace social network for release in spring.

The game was released for iOS on 29 March 2012, with an Android version announced for later. In July 2012, Fibble was updated with a new area and 8 levels after player feedback. Fibble was announced for Kindle Fire HD via Amazon Appstore at the tablet's announcement in September 2012.

== Reception ==
Tim Turi of Game Informer thought Fibble's gameplay is straightforward and may be soon be addicting. GamePro Germany's Michael Orth found the concept interesting in principle but criticized game's light content scope and depth. David Oxford of Gamezebo thought the game seemed suitable for younger or unexperienced players and found it to be too easy but still enjoyable. Harry Slater of Pocket Gamer found it to contain a lot of content but the game is not particular innovative. Edge's Nathan Brown criticized Fibble for barely containing the sandbox gameplay element and just the expectedly beautiful visuals element that were both found in previous Crytek games. Chris Schilling of Eurogamer wrote the next month on Fibble; Schilling criticized the points system as "overkill" and the cut-scenes as unnecessary, but concluded it to be a solid new debut.

== Legacy ==
Crytek's next mobile game, The Collectibles, was developed by the same team, but described as a "typical hardcore game".
