= The Climb 2 =

- Developer: Crytek
- Publisher: Crytek
- Producer: Fatih Özbayram
- Designer: Matthias Otto
- Engine: CryEngine
- Platforms: Oculus Quest; Oculus Quest 2
- Release: March 4, 2021
- Genre: Platform
- Mode: Single-player

The Climb 2 is a virtual reality platform game developed and published by Crytek. As the sequel to The Climb (2016), the game was released for Oculus Quest and Oculus Quest 2 on March 4, 2021. In the game, the player needs to climb different cliffs and skyscrapers. The game received generally positive reviews upon launch.

== Gameplay ==
The Climb 2 maintains the mechanics of the first game: players need to actively look around for handholds to traverse the environment, and maintain grip on a handhold with one hand while ascending to avoid falling - players can still use chalk to increase stamina, but the process is quicker than in the original game. The game features five biomes: Alps, Bay, Canyon and North are returning from the previous game, while City is a new, modern environment involving skyscrapers. Each zone has three distinct levels.

Like in the previous episode, each level has shortcuts and branching paths that allow players to reach the top faster, as well as more difficult mechanics like crumbling grips that let go after a certain amount of time. However, as a new addition, they may also encounter environmental hazards which may hinder the player's progress, like rattlesnakes that will bite the player causing them to lose their hold, or the grips being mounted on prisms of a Trivision that appear and disappear over time. The game also features sliding grips that cause the player to slide down on them and ultimately fall off, unless they can grab the next grip mid-slide.

The game features an asychronous multiplayer mode named Ghost Race. Players' performance will be uploaded to an online leaderboard, and they can compete with the ghost avatar of their friends.

== Development ==
The game was developed by German developer Crytek as the sequel to The Climb (2016). Production of the game started in early 2020. The team wanted to introduce more diverse settings to The Climb 2, as the first game only features natural environments. With the introduction of man-made environments, the team also had to introduce a more reactive physics system, in which structures would respond to the player's weight and momentum in order to introduce more gameplay variations. The design of the city was inspired by Miami, and the team wanted to capture the city's vibrant colors and its "sunny, bright vacation feeling". However, the team believed that a direct replication of Miami's highrise buildings would be "too dull to climb on". To make climbing in a city landscape exciting, each level incorporated different surfaces for players to climb on and horizontal traversals. For instance, players are sometimes tasked to scale three skyscrapers in one level, with each of them having their gameplay mechanics. The levels featuring natural environments were inspired by Maya Bay, the Grand Canyon, the Alps and Iceland.

The game was announced by Crytek on September 16, 2020, during Facebook Connect 2020 for Oculus Quest and Oculus Quest 2. While the game was originally set to be released late 2020, the game's release date was delayed to March 4, 2021. On April 21, 2021, Crytek announced the "Freestyle" expansion pack. The expansion pack, which is divided into two parts, introduces 12 new levels and a new mode in which the player must climb and grab onto handholds while following the rhythm of the background music. The first part of the expansion pack was released on April 22. The second part of the expansion was released on June 10, 2021.

== Reception ==
Reception

Aggregate scores
Aggregator	Score
Metacritic	75/100
OpenCritic	78% recommend

Review scores
Publication	Score
Destructoid	8.5/10
IGN	7/10

The game received "generally positive" reviews upon release according to review aggregator website Metacritic. Fellow review aggregator OpenCritic assessed that the game received strong approval, being recommended by 78% of critics.

While Gabriel Molly from IGN noted that the game did not have a lot of content at launch, the diversity of each level kept the experience fresh and interesting. He also noted that the game was "a significant leap in graphical quality" when compared to the first game. However, he believed that the lack of a proper multiplayer mode in the game is a missed opportunity. Writing for Polygon, Ben Kuchera praised The Climb 2 for improving on various aspects of its predecessor. He described the game as a rewarding experience, and praised the visuals for being "spectacular". In addition, he wrote that playing the game was "a surprisingly capable workout", though he remarked that the game was not accessible to players who would like to play while sitting. Writing for Mashable, Brenda Stolyar noted that playing The Climb 2 could be a nauseating experience, though she remarked that this may be the result of Crytek's intention to invoke a sense of vertigo people may experience when they are climbing.

During the 25th Annual D.I.C.E. Awards, the Academy of Interactive Arts & Sciences nominated The Climb 2 for "Sports Game of the Year".
