= Ryse: Son of Rome =

2013 video game

- Developer: Crytek
- Publisher: Microsoft Studios (Note: Windows version published by Crytek)
- Director: Cevat Yerli
- Producer: Michael Read
- Designer: Patrick Esteves
- Programmers: Chris Brunning; Carsten Wenzel
- Artist: Peter Gamble
- Writers: Steven Hall; Tim Partlett; Rich Bryant
- Composers: Borislav Slavov; Tilman Sillescu; Peter Antovski
- Engine: CryEngine
- Platforms: Xbox One; Windows
- Release: Xbox One: WW: November 22, 2013; Windows: WW: October 10, 2014
- Genres: Action-adventure, hack and slash
- Modes: Single-player, multiplayer

Ryse: Son of Rome is a 2013 action-adventure game developed by Crytek and published by Microsoft Studios. Set in an alternate version of Ancient Rome, Ryse follows the life of the Roman centurion Marius Titus as he becomes one of the leaders in the Roman Legion. Gameplay revolves around Marius using his sword to strike enemies and shield to deflect attacks. Execution sequences are featured in the game, which are quick-time events that serve as an extension to combat. The game features a cooperative multiplayer mode, which tasks players to fight against waves of enemies in maps that are changing dynamically.

The game's development began in 2006. Originally it was set to be a first-person Kinect-only title for the Xbox 360. However, the developer gradually redesigned the game to become a third-person hack and slash game, with Kinect serving a diminished role. The development of the game was originally handled by Crytek Budapest, but was later transferred to Crytek's headquarters in Frankfurt, Germany. The game's combat emphasizes on "flow", a term referring to a player's ability to move on to fight against another enemy upon defeating an enemy with few limitations in between. The team partnered with The Imaginarium Studios to develop the cinematic and motion-capture technology for the game. Competitive multiplayer modes developed by Ruffian Games were cancelled.

Revealed as Codename: Kingdoms at E3 2010, the game was reintroduced as Ryse: Son of Rome three years later. It was released in November 2013 as a launch title for the Xbox One, and was released on October 10, 2014 for Windows. It received mixed reviews upon launch, being praised for its visuals, narrative, emotional depth, characterization, art direction, music and high production values, but criticized for its short length, repetitive and simple gameplay and linear-oriented design. Cevat Yerli, CEO of Crytek, added that he was not satisfied with the sales of the game. Upon launch, the game was supported with several multiplayer-focused downloadable content, but the originally planned Challenge Editor was cancelled.

== Gameplay ==
The game's protagonist, Marius Titus, is equipped with a sword and a shield to fight against enemies. The game is powered by the fourth generation of Crytek's CryEngine.

Ryse: Son of Rome is an action-adventure hack and slash game played in a third-person perspective. Players assume control of Marius Titus, a Roman general who is on a quest to avenge his murdered family. Throughout the game, players gain access to weapons that can be used to assault enemies or defend themselves. For instance, players are equipped with a sword that can be used to strike and kill enemies, and a shield that can be used to deflect enemies' attack and break their defense. The strength of each attack can be decided by players. In addition to melee-based combat, the game features spears and javelins, which serve as ranged weapons.

The game's combat puts emphasis on "flow", a term referring to a player's ability to move on to fight against another enemy upon defeating and killing an enemy with few limitations in between. Combat is combo-based, and rewards are given to players for building a long combo. Marius can block attacks to break enemy combos to counterattack. In several segments of the game, Marius is involved in large-scale battles. Players are tasked to co-operate with, or command, other non-playable characters to defeat large numbers of enemies. The game features Kinect voice integration, in which players can issue commands to other characters to provide assistance, such as calling in arrows or catapults.

When players deal enough damage to an enemy, they can activate an execution sequence. Once the execution sequence has been initiated, enemies involved in the execution are highlighted automatically with colors by the game, and players can perform a series of quick time events by pressing the appropriate buttons. These execution sequences serve to grant additional resources to players, depending on how well the execution is performed. At any time prior to initiating an execution, the player can select one of four categories of executions to perform upon weakened enemies; the selected type of execution determines the type of resource that will be granted when an enemy is executed. Upon completing a successful execution sequence, players are granted the type of execution that was selected. There are four perks available for players. One boosts the player's damage for a short period after the execution; one refills the player's Focus bar; one allows players to regain lost health, and the last significantly boosts the amount of experience points received from the kill. These experience points can be used to purchase upgrades for various attributes, such as health, damage, or Focus bar capacity, and to unlock additional execution moves. The game still automatically completes and finishes these execution sequences when players fail to press the highlighted buttons, but provides a much smaller reward. Lining up two or more weakened enemies in close proximity allows the player to perform a double execution sequence, which greatly increases the reward granted.

There is also a co-operative multiplayer mode, in which two players team up to accomplish various challenges and fight against waves of increasingly difficult enemies in the Roman Colosseum, a gladiator arena setting. The environments of the Colosseum change dynamically in a match to add variety to the mode. Players can gain access to increasingly advanced armor and weapons as they progress through these multiplayer matches. Microtransactions are also featured, allowing players to purchase in-game upgrades with real-life currency.

== Plot ==
The game begins in medias res with Roman general Marius Titus leading the defence of Rome against a barbarian invasion. Marius leads the Roman emperor Nero into a safe room. At Nero's behest, Marius begins to tell his life story to the emperor.

Marius begins his story as a Roman legionary serving in the II Legion who returns to the Titus family villa in Rome to visit them before he is deployed to Alexandria. His visit is cut short as a sudden barbarian invasion occurs, resulting in the death of his parents and sister. Commander Vitallion, who served alongside Marius' father, transfers him to the XIV Legion, promising Marius vengeance for the death of his family. Vitallion leads the XIV Legion to the rebelling province of Britannia, where the fleet transporting them is almost destroyed by river chains. Marius' ship is hit by a trebuchet shot, but he survives and leads an attack which destroys the towers holding the chains up, preventing the Roman fleet from being destroyed; an impressed Vitallion promoted him to the rank of centurion. The XIV Legion marches on York, fighting numerous battles with Briton rebels on the way. Upon arriving at York, Marius leads the XIV Legion in an attack against a rebel army, capturing British king Oswald and his daughter Boudica.

The XIV Legion brings Oswald and Boudica before Nero's son Basilius, who forces Oswald to reveal where the Britons have sent Basilius' brother Commodus to. After Oswald informs the Romans that Commodus was traded to the inhabitants beyond Hadrian's Wall, Basilius orders the XIV Legion to march north and bring Commodus back. During the campaign there, a Roman scouting party led by Marius and Vitallion is ambushed by barbarians; Vitallion is captured, while Marius falls into a ravine but survives. Making his way to the main barbarian camp (where they are about to burn a wicker man with Vitallion inside), Marius kills the barbarian leader and rescues Vitallion and Commodus. Returning to York, Marius and Vitallion participate in a peace treaty between the Romans and Britons. However, Commodus murders Oswald, sparking a riot while Boudica escapes, and Marius realises that it was in fact the Emperor Nero himself who was responsible for causing the earlier invasion which resulted in the death of his family. Commodus flees York after tasking the XIV Legion to defend the city. Marius sacrifices himself so the last Roman ships can flee the city. However, Marius is resurrected by the Roman goddess Summer, and vows to avenge his family and kill Nero and his sons.

Returning to Rome, Marius enters the ludi in order to confront Nero and his sons directly. Dressed as legendary Roman general Damocles, Marius kills Basilius after participating in a private gladiator fight for him. In the aftermath, he sets a fortune teller free who prophesies that Marius will be killed by Damocles, but that he would kill Damocles as well; she also tells Marius that he cannot kill Nero, because the Emperor could only be killed by his own sword. Entering the Colosseum, he participates in a series of staged battles before engaging in a duel with Commodus. Despite Commodus' attempts to rig the fight in his favour, including using a poisonous gas to try and incapacitate him, Marius defeats him as well, decapitating him. Marius escapes the Colosseum and meets up with Vitallion, who informs him that an invading barbarian army led by Boudica is closing in on Rome, eager to seek revenge for Commodus murdering her father. During the ensuing battle, Vitallion is killed by Boudica and Marius assumes command; confronting her in single combat, he decapitates her.

The narrative returns to the conversation between Nero and Marius; the Emperor, having long since deduced that Damocles was Marius, flees further into the palace. As Marius gives chase, he is temporarily impeded by god of the north wind Aquilo, who is revealed to have been aiding Nero and his sons for the entire story because he wants to see Rome destroyed. However, Summer intervenes, allowing Marius to confront Nero and launch both the Emperor and himself off a parapet. Marius falls to his death, whilst Nero is viciously impaled on a giant sword belonging to a huge statue of himself, thus fulfilling both prophecies that were made to Marius earlier in the story: that Marius and Damocles would kill each other, and that Nero would perish at the hand of his own sword. The story ends with a voiceover from Summer revealing that due to Marius' efforts, the invasion was repelled and Rome "would go on to stand for a thousand years", and "endure... until the last days of man."

== Development ==
=== As a Kinect title ===
Ryse: Son of Rome was originally developed by Crytek Budapest. In 2004, Crytek released its debut title Far Cry, and in 2005, Microsoft Studios released the Xbox 360 and was working on a prototype for a motion sensing controller device called "Project Natal" (known now as Kinect). Ideas for Ryse originated in 2006 by Crytek's CEO Cevat Yerli, who was eager to expand the studio, and wanted the studio to work on multiple projects simultaneously. Early work and concept development began shortly afterwards, with Crytek working on a pair of fantasy games that were set in the same Medieval universe. They were Kings, a massively multiplayer online role-playing game, and Kingdoms, a first-person action role-playing game. They hoped that with Kingdoms, they could create an "up-close" and "visceral" experience. Crytek then pitched the game to different publishers, and eventually, in 2009, the company pitched the two projects to Microsoft. According to Nick Button-Brown, the general manager at Crytek, the game was not functional at that time, and only served to prove to the publisher that a first-person melee game was fun for players. The representative from Microsoft, Phil Spencer, admired Crytek's intention to expand, and thought that Microsoft's games line up for the Xbox 360 was lacking a first-person melee-combat game. As a result, they accepted to publish Kingdoms, and rejected Kings. The two companies agreed that the project would be a natural fit for Microsoft's yet-to-be-announced Kinect.

An excerpt from Ryse's E3 2011 gameplay trailer, showcasing the first-person perspective originally planned for Ryse

It was originally revealed as Codename: Kingdoms during Microsoft's E3 2010 press conference. During Microsoft's press conference at E3 2011, Ryse was announced as a Kinect-only title. The gameplay footage featured players using their own body gestures to control the protagonist to fight against enemies, and perform actions like sword wielding, blocking attacks with a shield, and head-butting. The trailer served as a test for Crytek to see whether the general audience liked the Kinect features or not. In early 2011, the game's direction was shifted from building a world of "high fantasy" to building a realistic ancient Rome, and the development of the game was shifted from Crytek Budapest to Crytek's headquarter in Frankfurt, Germany. The Budapest office was significantly downsized afterwards, and its focus was shifted to support development and smartphone games. It became one of six projects the company was working on. Different experiments were carried out for the game to see what elements would work and what would not. A team at Crytek proposed to turn the game to an on-rail interactive movie, which the team believed was suitable for Kinect's features and would able to showcase the power of CryEngine. The idea was later scrapped.

During the game's development, the team worried that the game may be too tiring for players, and that Kinect may not able to detect their movements accurately, leading to frustration. As a result, the team developed three prototypes for the game. The first prototype allowed players to play the entire game with Kinect, the second one tasks players to play the game with an Xbox 360 controller, with Kinect features, while the third one completely removed the Kinect features. Crytek eventually chose the second prototype, and shifted the game's perspective to become a third-person video game. In June 2012, Phil Spencer, corporate VP of Microsoft Studios, maintained that the game was still in development. and added that Kinect will only be "part of the game". With the changes in the game's control scheme, the game's focus also changed, with the team aiming to create a cinematic and character-focused experience for players. The change also extended the game's development process, and eventually, in May 2013, Ryse was confirmed to be a launch title for Microsoft's next game console, Xbox One. In June 2013 at the E3 Microsoft Conference, Crytek showed a gameplay video. Kinect was no longer part of the active battle but had a diminished role by providing squad commands through speech and gesture. The team at Crytek decided to make it a launch title instead of delaying it for further polishing, as they considered the launch of Xbox One an "emotional" event and wanted to be a part of it.

=== Gameplay and story ===
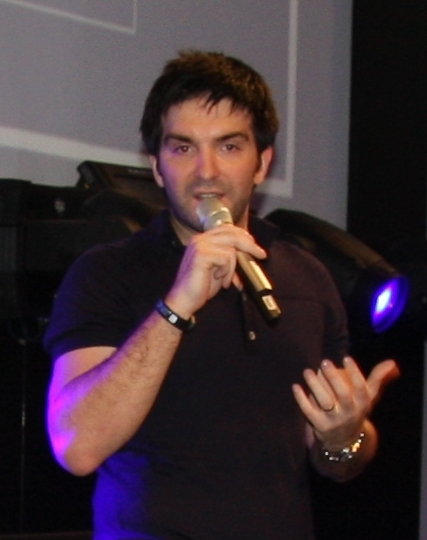
Cevat Yerli, the game's creative director

Ryse's combat puts many focuses on "flow" and crowd control. As a result, the team introduced a rhythm-styled combat. The flow was described to be one of the most important part in the game's mechanics, and the artificial intelligence of enemies were designed to break and disrupt players' flow. The team later chose to introduce the execution mechanics as they found that the combat was proven to be too difficult for players, and that the execution mechanics provided an easier way for players to defeat enemies. The game also focused on precision and timing, tasking players to hit enemies at the correct time and position to gain greater rewards. The developer also hoped that players will use creativity when dealing with enemies. A concept called "mashing to mastery" was introduced in Ryse, in which the game's combat was designed to be accessible for newcomers and be challenging for hardcore players. In order to achieve the "mashing to mastery" mechanic, the team introduced the execution mechanic, which is a series of quick-time events, as the team at Crytek hoped that it would make these scene more rewarding to players, as well as allowing the flow of combat to continue.

Ryse's intention was to build a cinematic story. The team put emphasis on building the game's protagonist, Marius Titus, who was described as a character with three different sides. The game's cinematic director, Peter Gornstein, considered that adding personalities to characters as one of the most important features in creating a good story, as it allows players to care for and emphasize the character. He also hoped that the character is consistent throughout the game. As a result, the team developed transition sequences, in which gameplay can fluidly transit to cinematic. The game also put emphasis on the protagonist's motion capture. To achieve this, the team collaborated with The Imaginarium Studios to develop the cinematic and motion-capture technology for the game. According to Yerli, having good motion capture technology can help "create the ultimate emotion". The game's camera was originally set to be controlled by artificial intelligence, drawing inspirations from Seven Samurai and Children of Men, but the idea was later scrapped and a dynamic camera was designed to replace it. The camera was also made closer to the playable character than other hack and slash games, as they hoped that they could show a "claustrophobic brutality" from it. According to Crytek, having a close up camera has always been the game's core element.

The developers claim to have drawn much of the inspiration for the game's combat and tactics from "the innumerable Roman campaigns that led to the modern concept of total war". Fifteen hero level characters were given full motion capture with the same detail as Marius. Unlike Crytek's previous projects, the game is set in ancient Rome, a place which the developer thought was underrepresented in video games. The game also features different Renaissance-inspired imagery. In order to create an accurate environment, the team visited different locations in Rome. While the game is set in Rome, its story is not entirely historically accurate. Crytek described it as a "historical mash-up", in which the team selected their favourite historical events and put them together into the game. The game's music is composed by Borislav Slavov and Peter Antovszki, Crytek's in-house composers. The soundtrack development began in February 2013, right after the completion of Crysis 3. Slavov considered composing the music for Ryse a great challenge, as he had to compose 250 minutes of music within a short time frame. Crytek also hired an external composer, Tilman Silescu, to help compose the music for the game.

Crytek contracted Ruffian Games to develop a competitive multiplayer mode for Ryse, but the feature was later cut from the final game. Despite that, a co-operative multiplayer mode was introduced, and tasked players to fight against waves of increasingly difficult human enemies. The team originally hoped to add sea battles and animals to the game, but after internal testing, these features were removed. An Xbox SmartGlass feature called the Challenge Editor was set to be introduced to the game after its launch. It allowed players to create custom challenges for the game's co-operative multiplayer. However, Crytek announced that the development of this feature had been ceased in February 2014.

=== Release ===
Ryse was originally revealed as an Xbox 360 title that was set to be released in early 2011. Revealed at E3 2010 as Codename Kingdom, the game missed its release window, and its official name was revealed during E3 2011 as Ryse. It was reintroduced as Ryse: Son of Rome at Microsoft's press conference at E3 2013 with a gameplay demo. The game served as a launch title for the Xbox One, and was released on November 22, 2013. The season pass, featuring different in-game bonuses and items, was released on the same day. The game was supported with downloadable content upon launch. Mars’ Chosen, Morituri Pack, Duel of Fates Pack, and Colosseum Pack were released from 2013 to 2014 and featured new maps and modes for the multiplayer portion of the game. A Legendary Collection, which featured the base game, the game's seasonal pass, and all the additional content released for the game, was released on October 7, 2014.

On August 7, 2014, Crytek announced that Ryse would be released for the PC platform in the fall of 2014. This version of the game is stated to support 4K resolution and included previously released downloadable content. The PC version was released on October 10, 2014. Crytek published the digital version of the PC version of the game, while Deep Silver published the retail version.

== Reception ==
Reception

Aggregate score
Aggregator	Score
Metacritic	XONE: 60/100; PC: 61/100

Review scores
Publication	Score
Destructoid	5/10
Electronic Gaming Monthly	7.5/10
Eurogamer	5/10
Game Informer	6/10
GameSpot	4/10
GamesRadar+	3.5/5
Giant Bomb	3/5
IGN	6.8/10
VideoGamer.com	7/10

Ryse: Son of Rome received "mixed or average" reviews according to review aggregator Metacritic. Despite the mixed reception, the Academy of Interactive Arts & Sciences nominated Ryse: Son of Rome for "Outstanding Achievement in Visual Engineering" and "Outstanding Character Performance" (Marius Titus) during the 17th Annual D.I.C.E. Awards. While no exact sales figure was revealed, Yerli expressed his disappointment with the sales of Ryse for the Xbox One in August 2014, blaming the low sales of the Xbox One.

The game's visuals received critical acclaim. Brian Albert from IGN thought that Ryse would be the perfect title for people to show off their console due to its high graphical quality. He also praised the game's wide variety of environments and fluid character animation. However, he criticized the game's boss-design. Hollander Cooper from GamesRadar strongly praised the game's graphics and the level of detail. Simon Miller from VideoGamer.com thought that the game fulfilled its purpose as an Xbox One launch title, and demonstrated the power of the console. Andrew Reiner from Game Informer considered that the game's cinematic as "towering achievements of visual design".

The game's story also received praise from most critics. Camron praised the game's voice-acting and setting, which he thought was "intriguing". However, he thought that the narrative was too basic, and missed many details that could have further improved the game's story. Albert admired the game's story, and thought that it was handled with great care. He added that the game's plot was easy for players to follow, even though the game features multiple unexpected twists. Cooper described the game's narrative as surprising, adding that the later part of the game successfully added personalities to both the game's heroes and villains. In stark contrast, Walton called the game's script as "laughable" and said that the dialogue made the plot unbelievable for players.

The game's gameplay received polarized reception. Marc Camron from Electronic Gaming Monthly like the fluid and smooth combat and the addition of the reward system for adding a layer of strategy to the game, though he felt the game's execution system slowed down the overall pace of combat. He added that the game's combat lacked complexity and depth, and was too repetitive for players to enjoy. Albert noted the combat system was too basic, and observed a repetitive pattern of enemies. Cooper thought that the game's combat was satisfying, and thought that the game's swordplay had successfully captured the sense of weight and impact. However, he also considered the system repetitive. Reiner criticized the execution sequences, which he considered excessive and over-simplistic. Mark Walton from GameSpot thought that the game design was too linear, and that the game discouraged any form of exploration. Miller thought that the game only revolved around one idea, which led to its simplistic gameplay. Many critics criticized the game's short length and lack of replay value.

Critics also had divided opinions on the game's multiplayer. Camron thought that it was a nice addition to the game, even though he thought it lacked the complexity a multiplayer mode should have, and that it failed to extend the game's longevity. Miller echoed this statement, and thought that the multiplayer mode failed to hook players. Walton thought that players would not return the mode after experiencing it once, and he described the mode as "bland". Albert, in contrast, considered the mode a unique addition to the game, and thought that it had successfully added some strategy elements to the game. Chris Carter from Destructoid thought that the multiplayer mode was better than the game's main campaign. He described it as a "pleasant surprise".

=== Controversy ===
A Federal Trade Commission investigation uncovered an undisclosed paid endorsement deal between Microsoft Studios and Machinima Inc. Microsoft Studios paid for fake organic reviews, and bound Machinima Inc. to "not portray [Microsoft], the Xbox One, or the Launch Titles in a negative manner". Ryse: Son of Rome was specifically listed in the FTC document as being one of the titles to receive fake reviews, and price quotes for these reviews range between $15,000 and $30,000.

== Sequel ==
According to Yerli, Ryse: Son of Rome was not a "one-off" title and would serve as the beginning of a new franchise. However, several reports claimed that Ryse 2 was cancelled because of a conflict between Crytek and Microsoft over who would own the rights to the franchise. In exchange for funding Ryse 2's development, Microsoft wanted to take over the Ryse intellectual property. Crytek would not agree to these terms, so the project was cancelled. Cevat Yerli denied that the game was cancelled in an interview with Eurogamer, adding that the relationship between Microsoft and Crytek remained strong and positive. Ryse was one of the last titles developed by Crytek before the company entered financial crisis and re-construction. The new Crytek is focused on developing free-to-play games and being a "game service" instead of a video game developer. Despite this, Ryse is still an intellectual property owned by Crytek.
