= Robinson: The Journey =

2016 video game

- Developer: Crytek
- Publisher: Crytek
- Composer: Jesper Kyd
- Engine: CryEngine
- Platforms: PlayStation 4 Microsoft Windows
- Release: PlayStation 4: NA: November 8, 2016; EU: November 9, 2016; Microsoft Windows: NA: February 7, 2017
- Mode: Single-player

Robinson: The Journey is a virtual reality video game developed and published by Crytek. The game released for the PlayStation 4 in November 2016, and for Microsoft Windows in February 2017. The game uses the PlayStation VR, Oculus Rift or SteamVR Compatible virtual reality headsets respectively on each platform.

The game deals with a space traveler named Robin, who becomes stranded on a planet where dinosaurs still roam. He must then manage to escape, with the help of an AI unit from his ship.

== Plot ==
The story begins when the main character, Robin, becomes stranded in a planet called Tyson III when his ship, the Esmeralda, makes a crash landing. Robin then travels around the planet with a flying AI orb, named HIGS, and a baby Tyrannosaurus Rex, Laika.

In the home campsite they fix a generator to get the power they need to free Laika. Then they travel to a farm, where they have to fix another generator. After that, they travel to the Tar Pit and Jungle (in any order) looking for any remaining HIGS units, to find out more about why the Esmeralda crashed. The HIGS units have black boxes which contain audio clips and images that help explain what happened to the Esmeralda. Then Robin and HIGS go looking for Laika and end up in the sinkhole, which leads to a graveyard, and eventually the crashed Esmeralda. Then Robin must turn on the power in the Planetarium in the Esmeralda in order to see the last of the corrupted HIGS data.

The game ends with Robin, HIGS, and Laika fighting an adult t-rex, then watching the remaining HIGS data.

== Gameplay ==
The player can use its multi-tool to scan creatures, which allows HIGS to store information about them that the player can then retrieve at any time, and to grab and hurl objects similar to the Gravity Gun from Half-Life 2. It also has a laser pointer, which the player can use to bring Laika to him by shining it at where he wants her to go and then calling her.

== Demos ==
Crytek first showed their early work in the game in the form of two VR demos, titled Back to Dinosaur Island and Back to Dinosaur Island 2. Back to Dinosaur Island was first shown at Gamescom 2014, and both demos were later released for free for the Oculus Rift.

== Compatibility ==
The PlayStation 4 version is notable for being one of the very few PlayStation 4 games not playable on the PlayStation 5 with backwards compatibility.

== Reception ==
Reception

Aggregate scores
Aggregator	Score
Metacritic	64/100
OpenCritic	26% recommend

Review scores
Publication	Score
Destructoid	6/10
Edge	7/10
Game Informer	5/10
IGN	5.5/10
PlayStation Official Magazine – UK	5/10

The PlayStation 4 version of Robinson: The Journey received "mixed or average" reviews from critics, according to review aggregator website Metacritic. Fellow review aggregator OpenCritic assessed that the game received fair approval, being recommended by 26% of critics.
