= The Climb (video game) =

2016 video game

- Developer: Crytek
- Publisher: Crytek
- Engine: CryEngine
- Platforms: Windows; Oculus Rift; Oculus Quest; Oculus Quest 2
- Release: Windows: April 28, 2016; Oculus Quest: December 3, 2019
- Genre: Platform
- Mode: Single-player

The Climb is a first-person virtual reality game, developed by Crytek and Oculus Studios. In it the player climbs cliffs in locations around the world. The game released for Microsoft Windows on April 28, 2016, while a Oculus Quest port was later released in 2019. A sequel, The Climb 2, was released in 2021.

== Gameplay ==
The player's task is to climb up to a summit using Oculus Touch (Note: As the game was released before the Oculus Touch was released, it can also be played using an Xbox controller, using the player's gaze to aim the hands.), moving their hands to grab the next ledge. Both hands have independent stamina-meters, which deplete if the player is only holding on with one hand - the player may attempt to hold the trigger half-way to maintain a grip without losing stamina, at the risk of accidentally letting go. To increase available stamina, the player may chalk their hands to maintain grip, which they can do by holding a button and shaking the controller, but this motion requires the player to let go their grip with that hand. If the player reaches a gap too big to the climb across, they can push themselves off the ledge to jump across. Paths occasionally branch out; the player also may press a button to display a hint for a possible path towards the goal. Paths occasionally contain dangling carabiners which serve as checkpoints, should the player fall off, and each map has two in-between resting platforms the player can stand on without a grip which also pause the timer.

Later ("advanced") maps contain additional hazards: Toxic Grips that temporarily lower the maximum stamina, Crumbling Grips that only last a few seconds, Technical Grips that are smaller ledges that deplete stamina faster, and Dirty Grips that are covered by rocks which the player needs to brush off with the controller before they're able to maintain a grip on it. Some levels contain additional elements such as ladders and ziplines, as well as unusual grips like a giant mammoth skull's tusks sticking out of a block of ice, or a downed airplane's propellers.

The game features four different environments: Bay, Canyon, Alps and North. Each of these contains five levels which are: Easy, Medium, and Hard, alongside two bouldering maps: bouldering maps are shorter but more difficult, with chalking and path hinting both disabled. The Climb additionally has an endless mode called "Practice Wall", that randomly generates sections of an infinite wall for the player to climb.

== Development ==
The Climb started development as a demo called Return to Dinosaur Island. They first built the demo in a cave, before moving it onto a cliff. After discovering the performance was still good while looking at landscapes from the cliff, they started to develop a game around the view. A developer said, "And even there, at the top of a cliff, everything was running smoothly. Looking out over the vistas, the render calls were all good, we're getting 90 frames per second, sub 20 millisecond response times. So now we've got the epic beautiful vistas, how do we do something fun in that experience?".

== Reception ==
Reception

Aggregate score
Aggregator	Score
Metacritic	71/100

Review scores
Publication	Score
Destructoid	8/10
Edge	6/10
Game Informer	5.75/10

The Climb received "mixed or average reviews" according to Metacritic.

Destructoid praised the visuals of The Climb, writing that "The commitment to a 60fps (90 for Climb) minimum frame rate and the power of the latest CryEngine build really helps suck you in". Rock Paper Shotgun liked how the game made the player feel like they were climbing, feeling that "It's the strangest thing: I barely move but I feel sweaty and achey after reaching a summit." While Game Informer's Kyle Hilliard enjoyed some of the mechanics of the game, he felt that playing the game for extended sessions could tire the player's neck. He wrote, "Leaning and stretching your neck to progress is necessary, even in the early climbs, and it became tiresome quickly. It added to the tension on my head and neck, which could be a problem for people already prone to discomfort in VR."

In July 2017, The Climb was declared by Oculus as the most commercially successful game on the Oculus Rift, grossing more than $1 million.

== Sequel ==
A sequel, The Climb 2, was released by Crytek for Oculus Quest and Oculus Quest 2 in March 2021.
