= Esports betting =

Gambling

Esports betting is the practice of gambling on a video game match. Esports betting can be done before the match starts or during the match. The 3 types of esports betting are fixed-odds betting, private betting, and skin/loot box betting. Betting games may include Counter-Strike: Global Offensive (CSGO), League of Legends (LoL) and Dota 2. Bets may be placed on such events such as: match winner, tournament winner, final score, odd/evens bets and over/under bets. Esports betting isn't regulated in same way as traditional gambling, thus sometimes underaged individuals end up betting. Esports betting is also substantially more complex than bets on traditional sports.

== Betting formats ==
- Fixed-odds betting, where odds are set in advance.
- In-play (live) betting, with odds updating during matches.
- Proposition bets, such as first kill or total kills.
- Fantasy esports betting, where users draft players and earn based on performance.
- Skin gambling, using virtual in-game items, particularly popular in games like CS:GO, which has prompted legal scrutiny.

== Controversies and integrity ==
The 2014 CS:GO match-fixing scandal involving iBUYPOWER resulted in lifetime bans for players. In response, the Esports Integrity Commission (ESIC) was created to monitor tournaments, enforce standards, and coordinate with sportsbooks.

== Legal status ==
=== United States ===
Esports betting legality varies by state. As of mid-2025, 16 states explicitly permit esports wagering through licensed sportsbooks, including Nevada, New Jersey, Pennsylvania, Colorado, West Virginia and Virginia. Some states exclude esports from their legal sports betting statutes, while others remain in legal ambiguity.

== See also ==
- Online gambling
- Skin gambling
- Loot box
- Gambling law
- Esports
