= Warface =

2013 first-person shooter video game

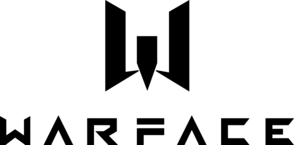
- Developers: Crytek Kiev (Note: Ported to Xbox 360 by Crytek UK. Additional work by Crytek Istanbul.); Blackwood Games (2019-2021); My.Games (2021–2026); Astrum Entertainment (2026-present)
- Publisher: Astrum Entertainment (worldwide)
- Engine: CryEngine 3
- Platforms: Microsoft Windows, Xbox 360, PlayStation 4, Xbox One, Nintendo Switch
- Release: Microsoft Windows; 21 October 2013; Xbox 360; 22 April 2014; PlayStation 4; 14 August 2018; Xbox One; 25 September 2018; Nintendo Switch; 18 February 2020
- Genre: First-person shooter
- Mode: Multiplayer

Warface is a free-to-play online first-person shooter video game developed by Crytek Kiev, co-produced by Crytek Seoul, and published by My.com. The full version of the game was released on 21 October 2013 as playable in North America and Europe. The game was developed with Crytek's in-house CryEngine 3. Warface centered around online firefights in player versus player (PvP) matches, with microtransactions allowing players to purchase weapons, equipment, and cosmetic gear.

The Xbox 360 port, which was developed by Crytek UK, was discontinued in February 2015. The console version of the game was relaunched for the PlayStation 4 and Xbox One in 2018 and on the Nintendo Switch in 2020. Members of the game's development team split from Crytek Kiev in February 2019 to form a new development studio, Blackwood Games, who handled future development duties for Warface A tactical shooter spin-off game named Warface: Breakout was released on 26 May 2020 for the PlayStation 4 and Xbox One.

As of August 25, 2026, all servers for the older version of the game—renamed "Warface: Clutch" in 2024—have been shut down across both consoles and PC. However, since June 2026, the popular Russian-based version of the game, developed and published by Astrum Entertainment, has expanded internationally—a first in the franchise's history, as Russian and international servers had previously always been kept separate. Since the summer of 2026, the developers have added support for new languages, including English and Chinese. Furthermore, as of November 2026, infrastructure for international servers is being deployed in the regions listed below:

-Europe (Paris and Amsterdam)

-South America (Brazil)

-North America (No specific city has been defined by the developers yet, but one might expect a server in Dallas or Washington, as was the case back in 2018)

Currently, the game is only available on PC and supports 3 languages (English, Russian, and Chinese).

The game is currently available on 3 launch platforms:

- VK Play (the platform most used by players)

- Astrum Play (the second most used platform)

- Steam (the least used platform, as Warface was launched there in October 2025)

== Gameplay ==
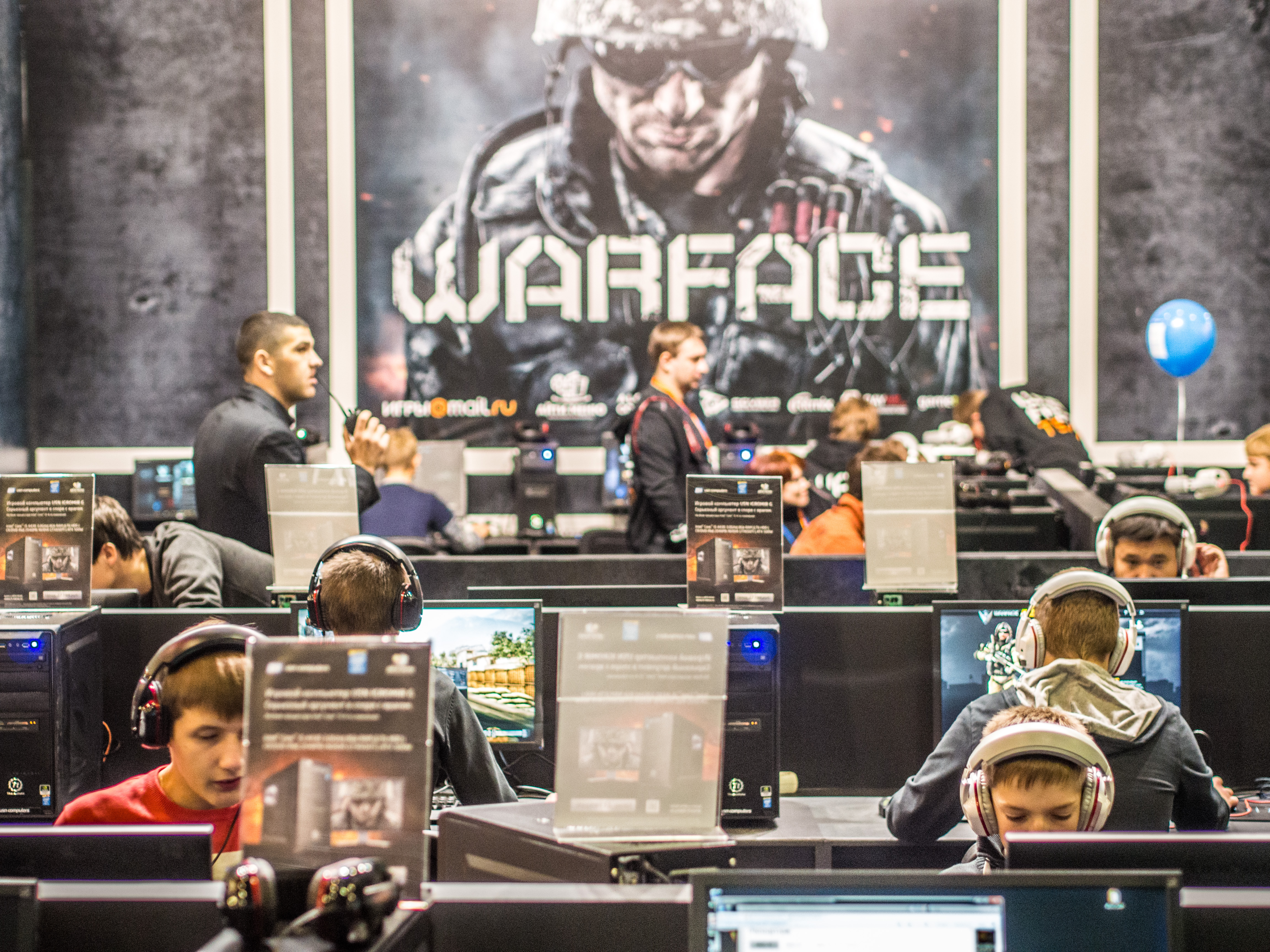
Warface play area at IgroMir 2013

=== Classes and weapons ===
Players could choose between five different classes: Sniper, Rifleman, Engineer, Medic, or SED (humanoid robot). Each class having its own specific combat role, with Medics reviving fallen and healing injured teammates, Engineers restoring and repairing armor and being able to revive SEDs, Riflemen providing additional ammunition, SEDs for suppressive fire and eliminating large groups of enemies in a short amount of time, and Snipers for engaging in long-range firefights.

Each class had its own unique weapons and equipment, often split into two categories. Riflemen could choose between a variety of assault rifles and light machine guns, and had the ability to distribute ammunition to themselves and other players. Snipers could wield bolt-action and semi-automatic marksman and sniper rifles. Medics had access to automatic and pump action shotguns, as well as the ability to heal and revive teammates. Engineers could use SMGs and personal defense weapons, and replenish armor, place explosive mines, revive SEDs and quickly interact with explosives. SEDs however, were different as they had access to heavy weaponry, as well as a grenade launcher that does medium damage along with a flash effect.

Every class carried a secondary firearm, and an additional melee weapon. Each soldier's tool belt was supplied with a hand grenade, and could be modified or expanded with extra smoke or flash-bang grenades. The Engineer could also carry anti-personnel mines. Weapons had customization slots that could be used to outfit a firearm with scopes, bipods, handles, flash guards, and suppressors.

=== Game modes ===
Players could compete online in PvP matches. [Such as: Team Death Match, Free For All, Storm, and many more.] Or combine their efforts against AI-controlled enemies in PvE battles, as well as Spec Ops. As players completed matches and missions, they would earn Experience Points, Warface Dollars, and Vendor Points. The amount of rewards earned varied depending on the number of players, the mission played, the mission's duration, the amount of checkpoints, and other criteria.

=== In-game currency ===
Warface Dollars could be used to rent weapons, and purchase armor and other items. Experience Points allowed each player to increase their personal Rank (level) in the game. Vendor Points were used to progress through the Arsenal tree, which featured three categories of items that were unlocked in line with the player's in-game progression: Weapons, Attachments, and Equipment. VIP Booster Packs, which could be purchased from the in-game store, allowed the player to earn additional Experience Points, Warface Dollars, and Vendor Points after a match. Another form of in-game currency, Kredits,(Ks) were a premium currency that allowed the purchase of the VIP Booster packs, player skins, bundles, special weapons, and more. Kredits werepurchased with real-world money and were often required to purchase high-end items including but not limited to: golden guns, skinned guns, boxes, and armor.

== Development ==
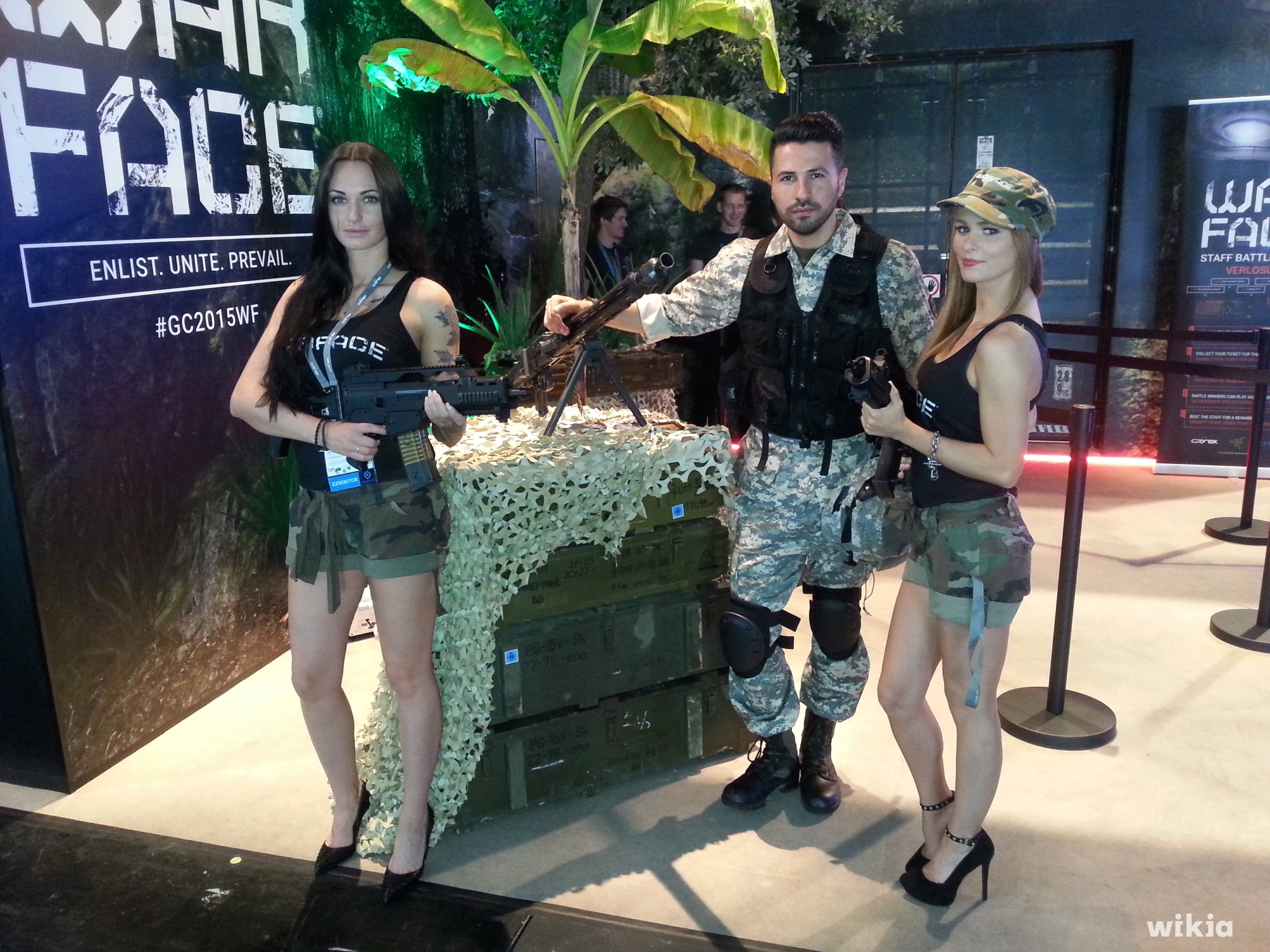
Promotion at Gamescom 2015

In August 2011, Crytek announced that Warface would be released for PC in Western markets in 2012. In February 2012, the game was announced to be published by Nexon in South Korea and Taiwan. The game was released for its open beta stage on Mail.Ru's game client in Russia. In July 2012, Trion Worlds announced itself as the publisher of the game in the United States, New Zealand, Turkey, Australia, and Europe. The closed beta version of Warface was released in western markets on 17 January 2013.

On 28 August 2013, Crytek announced that Warface would be released for the Xbox 360 in early 2014. The game was released for the Xbox 360 on 22 April 2014. On 3 December 2014, Crytek announced that it would cease support for the Xbox 360 version of the game, with support being fully withdrawn on 1 February 2015. In December 2017, Crytek announced to introduce a new cryptocurrency Crycash to the Turkish version of the game.

Warface was released for PlayStation 4 on 14 August 2018 and for Xbox One on 25 September 2018. In November 2018, the game added a Battle Pass to the PC version of the game known as 'The Syndicate'.

In February 2019, the game's development team formed a new studio, Blackwood Games, which would take over further development of Warface from Crytek Kiev.

In February 2026, My.Games announced that the servers will shut down on 27 May 2026 for PC and 25 August 2026 for console versions.

== Reception ==
Reception

Aggregate score
Aggregator	Score
Metacritic	PC: 62/100; X360: 60/100

Review scores
Publication	Score
GameSpot	6/10
GameStar	61%
Nintendo Life	7/10
PC Gamer (US)	58%

Warface received "mixed or average" reviews from critics, according to review aggregator Metacritic.

=== Awards ===
- 'Best Social/Casual/Online Game' from Gamescom 2012
- The Inven Award: BEST FPS Game G-Star 2012
