= Vaevictis Esports =

Russian esports organisation (2015–2021)

- Logo of Vaevictis Esports' all-female League of Legends team
- Founded: 16 November 2015
- Folded: c. 2021
- Based in: Moscow, Russia
- Manager: Ksenia "Trianna" Meshcheryakova
- General manager: Alexey "Madneps" Kholin

Vaevictis Esports was a Russian esports organization. It was founded in 2015 after its owners acquired the roster and League of Legends Continental League (LCL) spot of Night Inside. By the end of 2021, all of its teams had disbanded.

Vaevictis received international attention in early 2019, when it became the first to sign an all-female League of Legends team to compete in a Tier 1 professional league. The team had record-poor performances throughout the 2019 season, and Vaevictis was consequently removed from the LCL the following year for not fielding a competitive roster.

== League of Legends ==
Vaevictis announced on 10 February 2019 that it was signing an all-female League of Legends team to compete in the League of Legends Continental League (LCL), making it the first organization in a top-level professional league to do so. The roster was completely renewed after the existing pre-2019 players were let go. The announcement was immediately met with criticism and accusations of it being a publicity stunt, as everyone on the roster mainly played the support role and barely met the rank requirement to be on a professional team.

Vaevictis's starting roster for the 2019 LCL spring split consisted of top laner Diana "TR1GGERED" Ivanchenko, jungler Aida "Merao" Kazaryan, mid laner Elena "VioletFairy" Koval, bot laner Ksenia "Trianna" Meshcheryakova, and support Nataliya "Ankote" Zayko. In late February 2019, Vaevictis announced it was looking for new additions to their roster, and on 28 February top laner Elina "Intgration" Sokolova and bot laner Ekaterina "Hroft" Grishcheneva joined the team, while TR1GGERED and Ankote moved to support and substitute support, respectively.

Vaevictis helped set two LCL records in the 2019 spring regular season, one in each of their matches against Vega Squadron. In their first match against Vega Squadron on 17 February 2019, Vaevictis lost with 2 kills to Vega Squadron's 52, setting an LCL record for the highest kill differential in a single game. Riot Games Russia issued a warning to Vega Squadron for "intentionally stretching out" the match near the end. In their second match together on 3 March 2019, Vega Squadron defeated Vaevictis in 13 minutes, making it the shortest game in LCL history and the ninth shortest overall in competitive League of Legends. Vaevictis ended the regular season in last place with 0 wins and 14 losses.

In an interview given on 7 March 2019, Ankote gave an explanation for the roster changes. She alleged that a toxic team environment and verbal harassment by TR1GGERED led to arguments between her and her teammates, which prompted Vaevictis's management to seek a replacement for either her or TR1GGERED. Ankote apologized to her teammates for her performance in the top lane after roleswapping with TR1GGERED before the roster changes, saying she was not used to the role. However, according to Ankote, her teammates ridiculed her apology and dismissed it as an excuse. After an investigation, Riot Games Russia issued TR1GGERED a two-game ban on 15 March 2019 for verbal harassment and threatening Ankote on a live stream.

A new roster was announced on 7 July 2019. Top laner Anastasiya "HellMa" Pleyko and mid laner Olga "PewPewSolari" Arsenyeva joined Vaevictis, while TR1GGERED, Ankote, Hroft, and Don Hell left. Merao remained on the team, as did Intgration, who switched roles and became a bot laner. On 25 July 2019, head coach Daniel "Remus" Klimanov, who played for Vaevictis prior to their decision to field an all-female team, joined the roster as their new mid laner. However, the team once again finished last with a 0–14 record.

In February 2020 it was announced that Vaevictis would be removed from the LCL because the team did not field a competitive roster during the 2019 season, leading to poor results that were disproportionate to that of the other teams in the league. Riot Games Russia stated: "The results of the 2019 season showed a huge difference in Vaevictis Esports' results compared to other LCL teams, which is an unacceptable level of competitiveness in a franchised league. In this regard, Vaevictis Esports will not participate in the LCL's 2020 season."
