= Inon Zur =

Israeli-American composer

Inon Zur ינון צור
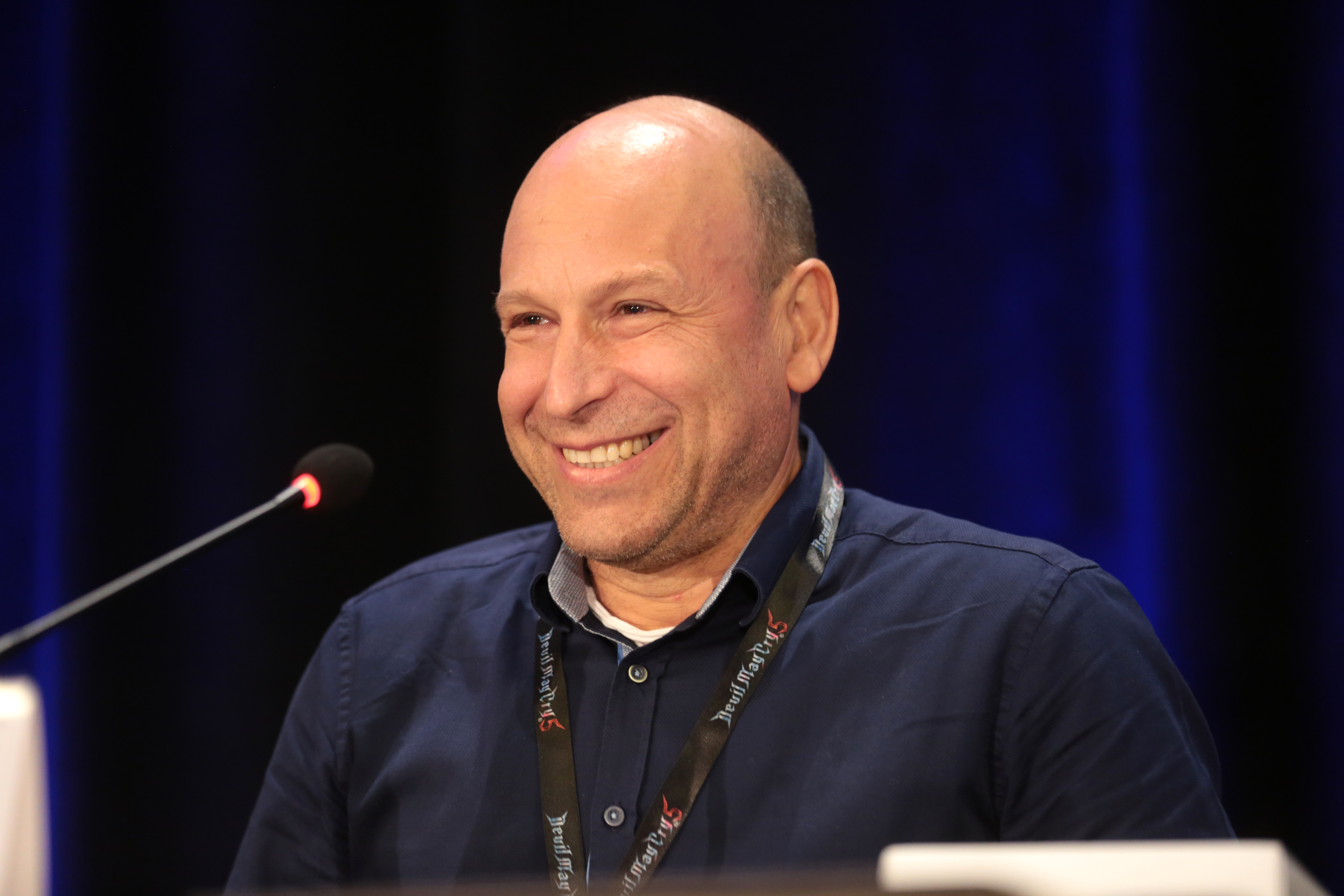
- Zur in 2018

Background information
- Born: Israel
- Genres: Video game music Film score Trailer music
- Occupation: Composer
- Years active: 1994–present
- Website: inonzur.com

Inon Zur (Hebrew: ינון צור, [jiˈnon ˈt͡sur]) is an Israeli-born American composer of soundtracks for film, television, and video games. He has composed soundtracks for over 80 video games, which include Dragon Age, EverQuest, Fallout, Prince of Persia, Star Trek, the Syberia series, and Starfield. He has received multiple nominations, including three BAFTAs, and has won several awards, including an Emmy. Various music awards for his soundtracks on Crysis (2007), Dragon Age: Origins (2009), The Elder Scrolls: Blades (2019), Syberia: The World Before (2023), Starfield (2024) and Rise of the Ronin (2024).

== Early life ==
Inon Zur was born in Israel. At the age of five, he was trying to compose harmonies with his mother's singing, and became inspired by classical music. He learned to play the French horn as a child, studied piano by the age of eight, and was studying composition by the age of ten. He graduated from the Music Academy of Tel Aviv, and spent four years in the Israeli Army in an elite Armored unit. He emigrated to the United States in 1990 to study at the Dick Grove School of Music for a year, and then under private tutor Jack Smalley, a television music composer, and others for two years at the University of California, Los Angeles.

== Career ==
Zur began his career in 1994 by working on soundtracks for movies, such as Yellow Lotus, featured at the Sundance Film Festival. He signed on to compose for Fox Family for six years, and made soundtracks for various children's television shows produced by Saban Entertainment, including Big Bad Beetleborgs, Digimon and Power Rangers. By 2002, he estimated that he had composed the soundtrack to over 360 Power Rangers episodes. His compositions for these programs were credited to Shuki Levy and Kussa Mahchi (an alias for Haim Saban), with Zur usually only being credited as a music producer. This was allegedly so the duo could collect the music royalties. Zur and all other composers working at this company agreed to give up the rights to their compositions prior to joining. He won his first award during this period in his career, a Telly Award for his work on Power Rangers: Turbo. While he enjoyed the work, he began to want to go work somewhere "more intriguing, more advanced, and basically a place that people really appreciate music more"; his agent overcame his initial reluctance and convinced him to work in the video games industry. His first video game soundtrack was 2000's Star Trek: Klingon Academy, which he started composing for the game in 1997. Zur moved on to prestigious titles, composing for the award-winning and critically acclaimed Baldur's Gate II: Throne of Bhaal in 2001 and Icewind Dale II in 2002, among many others. Icewind Dale II earned him the first of many nominations for video game music awards, that of the Game Audio Network Guild's Music of the Year award. He continued to work on movies and television programs during these years.

Zur has made dozens of cinematic scores for trailers. His last full movie soundtrack to date was that of 2014's Reclaim. He has worked on a few television series since then; his last traditional television soundtrack was for Ghost Whisperer in 2007, though he has composed music for webisode and Animated series since then. He continued to work on numerous video games, including Prince of Persia: The Two Thrones in 2005 and Crysis in 2007. He has garnered several nominations for video game music awards, including his first win, for Men of Valor in the Best Original Instrumental track category of the 2004 Game Audio Network Guild awards.

Zur penned the original musical score for Crysis, Dragon Age, Fallout, Syberia, and Starfield franchises.

The most notable titles Zur has composed for have been Icewind Dale II (2002), EverQuest Online (2003), Men of Valor (2004), Crysis (2007), Fallout 3 (2008), Prince of Persia (2008), Dragon Age: Origins (2009), Fallout: New Vegas (2010), World of Tanks: Mercenaries (2017), Dragon Age II (2011), Fallout 4 (2015), Fallout 76 (2018), The Elder Scrolls: Blades (2019) and, most recently, Starfield (2023).

== Performances ==
Zur's compositions have been played several times in live concerts. The first of these was a concert held in Seoul, South Korea, on May 30, 2006, dedicated to his music for Lineage II: Chronicle V: Oath of Blood. On August 20, 2008, music from his soundtrack to Crysis was played in Leipzig, Germany, at a Video Games Live concert. His music from Dragon Age: Origins and Prince of Persia was performed at the September 26, 2009 "A Night in Fantasia 2009" concert in Sydney, Australia, by the Eminence Symphony Orchestra. Zur was a special guest at the concert.

In an industry first, a dedicated concert of his music from Lord of the Rings: War in the North was performed each evening at the 2011 Electronic Entertainment Expo (E3) in Los Angeles. The one-hour concert series was conducted by Zur and performed by The Hollywood Orchestra and Choir with the participation of The Lyris Quartet and solos from celebrated vocalist Aubrey Ashburn. He originally conducted and recorded the game with the London Philharmonia Orchestra and the Pinewood Singers Choir at the legendary Abbey Road Studios in London.

In 2018, at the London venue the Eventim Apollo, Zur composed his different pieces from the Fallout and The Elder Scrolls series during a live concert that Bethesda Game Studios co-hosted with the War Child (charity). The London Symphony Orchestra performed Zur's Starfield score at Bethesda's 10th Anniversary The Elder Scrolls V: Skyrim concert in 2021. The Hollywood Bowl Orchestra gave a 10-year concert on June 25, 2023, at The Game Awards, which featured well-known video game soundtracks. The concert included a rendition of Zur's Starfield theme.

Zur and Imagine Dragons went to tour together in March 2025. Zur composed with the Los Angeles Film Orchestra on music for Imagine Dragons' Hollywood Bowl concerts.

== Legacy ==
Zur's music has been featured in numerous top-selling game franchises. He has been described as being "internationally recognized as one of the A-list orchestral composers in the video games industry". Variety named him on a short list of top video game composers. He was listed on top 40 greatest video games composers of all time (ranked 17th by composercode.com)

In the film industry Zur specializes on cinematic scoring for film trailers. He's worked with the likes of BMG Production Music on films such as the Harry Potter and the Order of the Phoenix, X-Men Origins: Wolverine, The Hobbit, and Avengers: Age of Ultron. Including dozens of other film trailer music. He's also worked with NCSOUND on several video game projects.

His songs have often been covered by numerous artists. Raney Shockne and Elizaveta did a cover of Zur's Dragon Age: Origins "I am the One" song for Dragon Age: Inquisition. Zur was inducted into The Recording Academy as a new member in 2023.

Inon Zur and Imagine Dragons collaborative song Children of the Sky was part of the Lonestar Freedom Mission on the Intuitive Machines' Athena moon lander, aiming to be the first song broadcast from the moon.

== Musical style and influences ==
Zur's compositions frequently are focused on full orchestras, choir and, in some games like Prince of Persia, ethnic instruments like Arabic flutes and the woodwind duduk. He has often collaborated with the Northwest Sinfonia orchestra from Seattle, though he has on occasion used other orchestras. Whenever Zur works with a real orchestra, he always conducts it himself. He has named some of his musical influences as classical artists such as Sergey Prokofiev, Igor Stravinsky, and Beethoven, movie composers like John Williams and Jerry Goldsmith, and jazz artists like George Gershwin and Henry McFeeny. While he would one day like to compose music not intended to be part of a larger piece of media, he finds that the pressure of a deadline and the feedback from the developers are crucial in his development process. He feels that his music sounds best when it is in the context given by the media it was made for, though he feels that performances of the music by itself transforms it "from just a soundtrack to an art form on its own". Zur sometimes collaborates with other musicians while composing his game soundtracks; for example, he worked with Florence and the Machine to create a unique rendition of "I'm Not Calling You A Liar" for the Dragon Age II soundtrack.

Inon Zur – First Light
A sound clip from Crysis

Zur typically is brought in to compose for a game once it is mostly complete, though he notes that that is earlier than for films and television—where nothing changes after he starts besides post-production effects—making video game music composition a more "flexible" process. He finds that it is "crucial" for him to play a game before he can compose music for it, even if it's only a development version. Rather than compose music based around the setting in the game where it will be played, Zur composes music around the emotion that he wants the player to feel at that point in the game. While he feels that music composition technology has come far enough in recent years to no longer be a limiting factor in his music, he does feel that the music budgets for games limit what he can create. Zur feels that he is considered in the industry to be a very fast composer, which he attributes to his tendency to compose music "intuitively", rather than spending a lot of time planning it out. When not composing, Zur likes to play video games, especially those he has composed for, as well as play basketball and spend time with his family. The types of projects that he would like to work on in the future that he has not yet done are children's games and soundtracks incorporating jazz music.

== Works ==
=== Video games ===
Year	Title	Notes
2000	Star Trek: Klingon Academy	
2000	Star Trek: New Worlds	with Julian Soule
2000	Star Trek: Starfleet Command II: Empires at War	
2001	Star Trek: Starfleet Command: Orion Pirates	
2001	Baldur's Gate II: Throne of Bhaal	expansion pack; with Howard Drossin
2001	Fallout Tactics: Brotherhood of Steel	
2002	Icewind Dale II	
2002	War and Peace: 1796–1815	
2002	Run Like Hell	
2002	Neverwinter Nights	Additional music; with Jeremy Soule
2003	EverQuest	Additional music (DLC expansions Underfoot to The Broken Mirror)
2003	EverQuest Online	Additional music (DLC expansion); with Jeremy Soule
2003	Lineage II	
2003	Lionheart: Legacy of the Crusader	
2003	SOCOM II U.S. Navy SEALs	
2004	EverQuest II	Additional music (DLC Expansion)
2004	EverQuest War On Faydwer	music from Zur's Echoes of Faydwer
2004	Champions of Norrath	
2004	Warhammer 40,000: Dawn of War	Additional Music; with Jeremy Soule
2004	Power Rangers Dino Thunder	
2004	Syberia II	
2004	Crusader Kings	
2004	Shadow Ops: Red Mercury	
2004	Men of Valor	
2004	Prince of Persia: Warrior Within	with Stuart Chatwood
2005	Champions: Return to Arms	
2005	Combat: Task Force 121	
2005	Twisted Metal: Head-On	
2005	Prince of Persia: The Two Thrones	with Stuart Chatwood
2005	Prince of Persia: Revelations	with Stuart Chatwood
2005	Gauntlet: Seven Sorrows	with Jason Graves & Alexander Brandon
2005	Warhammer 40,000: Dawn of War – Winter Assault	
2006	Warhammer 40,000: Dawn of War – Dark Crusade	
2006	Pirates of the Caribbean: The Legend of Jack Sparrow	
2007	Company of Heroes: Opposing Fronts	Additional music; with Ian Livingstone & Jeremy Soule
2007	Exteel	
2007	Prince of Persia: Rival Swords	with Stuart Chatwood
2007	Naruto: Rise of a Ninja	with various others
2007	Asura	
2007	Crysis	
2008	Crysis Warhead	
2008	Fallout 3	
2008	Naruto: The Broken Bond	
2008	Prince of Persia	with Stuart Chatwood
2008	Prince of Persia: The Fallen King	with Stuart Chatwood
2008	Warhammer 40,000: Dawn of War – Soulstorm	
2009	Dragon Age: Origins	
2009	James Cameron's Avatar: The Game	Nintendo DS version
2010	Ace Combat: Joint Assault	
2010	Fallout: New Vegas	
2010	Dragon Age: Origins – Awakening	
2010	Assassin's Creed Project Legacy (Note: originally named "Secret Project Number Three" using music from the film Assassin's Creed: Ascendance)	
2010	StarCraft II: Wings of Liberty	with various others
2011	Rift	
2011	Dragon Age II	
2011	TERA	
2011	Thor: God of Thunder	
2011	The Lord of the Rings: War in the North	
2012	Guardians of Middle-earth	
2012	Dragon's Dogma	with various others
2012	Soulcalibur V	with various others
2012	The Amazing Spider Man	Additional music
2012	Tian Xia III	
2012	Rift: Storm legion	with various others
2013	Sacred Citadel	
2013	Ryse: Son of Rome	Trailer-A Hero Rises
2013	Baldur's Gate II: Enhanced Edition	(music editing) with various others
2013	Heroes of Dragon Age	several songs from Dragon Age series
2014	Dragon Age: Inquisition	Cinematics & one song
2014	The Elder Scrolls Online	Early access version & Testing only
2014	Fantasia: Music Evolved	
2015	Fallout 4	
2015	Sword Coast Legends	
2016	Hero's Song	
2016	Eagle Flight	
2016	Space Quest	Themes only
2016	Fallout Shelter	Trailer
2017	Syberia III	
2017	Kingdom Come: Deliverance	Cinematic trailer
2017	World of Tanks: Mercenaries	Additional music for console version
2018	Pathfinder: Kingmaker	with Dmitry V. Silantyev
2018	Durango: Wild Lands	
2018	Battle Through the Heavens	
2018	60 Parsecs!	
2018	Fallout 76	
2018	PUBG Mobile	with various others
2018	The Elder Scrolls VI	Trailer
2019	The Elder Scrolls: Blades	
2019	Blacksad: Under the Skin	
2019	Fallout Shelter: Online	Main Theme
2020	The Waylanders	
2020	Prince of Persia: The Dagger of Time	
2021	Outriders	
2022	Syberia: The World Before	
2023	Starfield	
2023	Warhaven	
2024	Rise of the Rōnin	
2024	Ashfall	with Hans Zimmer
2024	Starfield: Shattered Space	
2024	Nazar	
2024	AFK Journey	
2025	Amerzone	
Cancelled	Arena of Fate	
Cancelled	Ashes of Creation	with Bear McCreary
Cancelled	Prince of Persia 3: Kindred Blades	
Cancelled	StarCraft: Ghost	

=== Films ===
Year	Title	Notes
1995	Yellow Lotus	
1997	Ashes	
1997	Casper: A Spirited Beginning	
1997	Turbo: A Power Rangers Movie	
1998	The Refugee	
1998	Rusty: A Dog's Tale	
2000	Power Rangers in 3D: Triple Force	
2001	Digimon Adventure 02: Revenge of Diaboromon	
2001	Digimon Tamers: Battle of Adventurers	
2002	Digimon Tamers: Runaway Locomon	
2002	Digimon Frontier: Island of Lost Digimon	
2005	The Hitchhiker's Guide to the Galaxy	Trailer
2005	The New World	Trailer
2005	Kingdom of Heaven	Trailer
2006	Annapolis	Trailer
2007	Harry Potter and the Order of the Phoenix	Trailer
2007	Stardust	Trailer
2008	The Tale of Despereaux	Trailer
2008	Fool's Gold	Trailer
2008	The Scorpion King 2: Rise of a Warrior	Trailer
2008	The Other Boleyn Girl	Trailer
2008	The Spiderwick Chronicles	Trailer
2009	Drag Me to Hell	Trailer
2009	X-Men Origins: Wolverine	Trailer
2009	Alvin and the Chipmunks: The Squeakquel	Trailer
2009	Race to Witch Mountain	Trailer
2010	Assassin's Creed: Ascendance	Short
2010	Tinker Bell and the Great Fairy Rescue	
2011	Jane Eyre	Trailer
2012	The Hobbit	Trailer
2013	The Smurfs 2	Trailer
2014	Reclaim	
2015	Welcome to Forever	Short
2015	Fantastic Four	Trailer
2015	Avengers: Age of Ultron	Trailer
2015	The Good Dinosaur	Trailer
2016	Ghostbusters	Trailer
2017	Saber Rock	
2017	The Shape of Water	Trailer
2017	All the Money in the World	Trailer
2018	The Kindergarten Teacher	Trailer
2018	The Sisters Brothers	Trailer
2019	Knives Out	Trailer
2019	Michael vs Jason: Evil Emerges	Short (music from Fallout 76)

=== Television ===
Year	Title	Notes
1994	Valley of the Dolls	
1995	Big Bad Beetleborgs	
1996	The Vision of Escaflowne	
1997	Power Rangers Turbo	
1997	Beetleborgs Metallix	
1998	Ramadhan in Indonesia	
1998	Power Rangers in Space	
1998	Mystic Knights of Tir Na Nog	
1998	Like Father, Like Santa	Television film
1999	Au Pair	Television film
1999	Big Guy and Rusty the Boy Robot	
1999	Power Rangers Lost Galaxy	
2000	St. Patrick: The Irish Legend	
2000	Final Ascent	Television film
2001	Au Pair II	Television film
2001	Power Rangers Time Force	
2001-2002	Digimon Tamers	Additional music
2002-2003	Digimon Frontier	
2010	The Walking Dead	Trailer
2016	Fallout: The Junktown Ranger	Short
2017	Legion	Trailer
2022	We Baby Bears	Additional music
2023–present	The Settled Systems: A Starfield Animated Anthology	Webisode Series
2024–present	Fallout	Theme Writer and Two episodes

== Awards and nominations ==
Awards and nominations
Year	Award	Category	Work	Result
1997	Telly Awards	Best Score	Power Rangers: Turbo	Won
2001	Gamespy: Game of the Year Awards	Best Original Music	Baldur's Gate II: Throne of Bhaal	Won
2002	Game Audio Network Guild	Music of the Year	Icewind Dale II	Nominated
2003	Game Audio Network Guild	Best Original Instrumental Song	SOCOM II U.S. Navy SEALs – "Main Theme"	Nominated
2004	Game Audio Network Guild	Best Original Instrumental Song	Men of Valor – "Main Theme"	Won
2004	Game Audio Network Guild	Best Live Performance Recording	Men of Valor	Nominated
2004	Game Audio Network Guild	Best Original Soundtrack Album	Men of Valor	Nominated
2004	Game Audio Network Guild	Best Original Soundtrack Album	Shadow Ops: Red Mercury	Nominated
2006	Canadian Awards for the Electronic & Animated Arts	Best Original Musical Score	Warhammer 40,000: Dawn of War – Dark Crusade	Nominated
2008	5th British Academy Games Awards	Best Original Score	Fallout 3	Nominated
2008	Spike Video Game Awards	Best Original Score	Fallout 3	Nominated
2008	Golden Joystick Awards	Soundtrack of the Year	Fallout 3	Nominated
2008	Game Audio Network Guild	Best Original Vocal – Choral	Prince of Persia – "Menu Theme"	Nominated
2008	Game Audio Network Guild	Best Original Instrumental	Prince of Persia – "Healed Land"	Nominated
2008	Motion Picture Sound Editors	Best Sound Editing - Computer Entertainment	Crysis	Nominated
2009	Hollywood Music in Media Awards	Best Original Song – Video Game	Dragon Age: Origins – "I Am the One"	Won
2009	Hollywood Music in Media Awards	Best Original Score – Video Game	Dragon Age: Origins	Nominated
2009	Game Audio Network Guild	Music of the Year	Dragon Age: Origins	Nominated
2009	Game Audio Network Guild	Best Soundtrack Album	Dragon Age: Origins	Nominated
2009	Game Audio Network Guild	Best Original Vocal – Pop	Dragon Age: Origins – "I Am the One" (High Fantasy Version)	Nominated
2009	Game Audio Network Guild	Best Original Vocal – Pop	Dragon Age: Origins – "Lelianna's Song"	Nominated
2009	Movie Music UK Awards	Best Original Video Game Score	Dragon Age: Origins	Won
2009	Game Audio Network Guild	Best Interactive Score	Crysis	Won
2011	Hollywood Music In Media Award	Best Original Score – Video Game	Dragon Age II	Nominated
2011	Hollywood Music In Media Award	Best Original Song – Video Game	Dragon Age II – "Rogue Heart"	Nominated
2011	Spike Video Game Awards	Best Song In A Game	Dragon Age II – "I’m Not Calling You A Liar"	Nominated
2012	Game Audio Network Guild	Best Original Vocal – Pop	Dragon Age II – "Rogue Heart"	Nominated
2014	Hollywood Music In Media Award	Best Original Score - Video Game	Asura	Nominated
2014	11th British Academy Games Awards	Music	Disney Fantasia: Music Evolved	Nominated
2015	Game Audio Network Guild	Best Original Song –	Sword Coast Legends – "The Path Of Destiny"	Nominated
2015	Hollywood Music In Media Award	Best Original Song – Video Game	Sword Coast Legends – "The Path Of Destiny"	Nominated
2015	Game Audio Network Guild	Vocal Theme – Video Game	Sword Coast Legends – "The Path Of Destiny"	Nominated
2015	The Game Awards 2015	Best Score/Soundtrack	Fallout 4	Nominated
2016	Game Audio Network Guild	Best Interactive Score	Fallout 4	Nominated
2016	12th British Academy Games Awards	Music	Fallout 4	Nominated
2017	National Capital / Chesapeake Bay Emmy Awards	Documentary - Topical	Saber Rock	Won
2019	Hollywood Music In Media Award	Best Original Score/Song – Mobile Game	The Elder Scrolls: Blades	Won
2019	GoldSpirit Awards	Best Original Score for a Videogame	Fallout 76	Nominated
2023	Game Audio Network Guild	Best Physical Soundtrack Album	Syberia: The World Before	Nominated
2023	NYX Game Awards	Best Music for PC Game	Syberia: The World Before	Won
2023	Hollywood Music in Media Award	Best Original Song/Score - Mobile Video Game	PUBG Mobile (Note: Short for PlayerUnknown's Battlegrounds Mobile, and known in China as Game for Peace (also known as Peacekeeper Elite or He ping jing ying))	Won
2024	BMI Film & TV Awards	Video Game Award (Music)	Starfield	Won
2024	PS Blog Game of the Year Awards	Best Soundtrack	Rise of the Rōnin	Nominated
2024	PlayStation Game Awards	Traditional Sound Award (Music)	Rise of the Rōnin	Won
