= Crysis (video game) =

2007 first-person shooter

- Developer: Crytek (Note: Saber Interactive co-developed the Remastered version.)
- Publishers: Electronic Arts; Crytek (Remastered)
- Director: Cevat Yerli
- Producer: Bernd Diemer
- Designers: Sten Huebler; Christopher Auty; Jack Mamais
- Programmers: Marco Koegler; Craig Tiller; Marco Corbetta
- Artists: Michael Khaimzon; Magnus Larbrant
- Writers: Martin Lancaster; Tim Partlett; Greg Sarjeant
- Composer: Inon Zur
- Series: Crysis
- Engine: CryEngine 2 (PC); CryEngine 3 (PS3, X360, Remastered)
- Platforms: Microsoft Windows; PlayStation 3; Xbox 360; Remastered; Nintendo Switch; Microsoft Windows; PlayStation 4; Xbox One
- Release: Microsoft Windows: NA: November 13, 2007; AU: November 15, 2007; EU: November 16, 2007; Xbox 360: WW: October 4, 2011; PlayStation 3: NA: October 4, 2011; EU: October 5, 2011; Remastered; Nintendo Switch: WW: July 23, 2020; Windows, PS4, Xbox One: WW: September 18, 2020
- Genres: First-person shooter, stealth
- Modes: Single-player, multiplayer

Crysis is a 2007 first-person shooter game developed by Crytek and published by Electronic Arts for Microsoft Windows. It is the first game in the Crysis series. A standalone expansion, Crysis Warhead, was released in 2008, following similar events as Crysis but from a different narrative perspective. A remastered version of Crysis titled Crysis Remastered was released for Microsoft Windows, PlayStation 4, Xbox One and Nintendo Switch in 2020 and is also part of the Crysis Remastered Trilogy compilation.

Crysis is set in a future where a massive, ancient alien-built structure has been discovered buried inside a mountain in the fictional Lingshan Islands, near the coast of the east Philippines. The single-player campaign has the player assume the role of U.S. Army Delta Force soldier Jake Dunn, referred to in-game by his callsign, Nomad. Nomad is armed with various futuristic weapons and equipment, most notably a "Nanosuit" which was inspired by the real-life military concept of Future Force Warrior. The player fights both North Korean and extraterrestrial enemies in various environments on and around the island.

When Crysis released, it was praised for setting new milestones in video game graphics, commensurate with its notoriously high hardware requirements for the time. This has led to the phrase "Can it run Crysis?" becoming an Internet meme as the game continued to be used as a benchmark for the performance of gaming PCs years after its release. The game received critical acclaim, with praise for its graphics design, presentation, and physics, while some criticized its story and multiplayer mode. A sequel, Crysis 2, was released in 2011.

== Gameplay ==
A day/night cycle operates during the course of the single-player campaign.

As with Crytek's previous game, Far Cry, Crysis is a first-person shooter game with many ways to meet objectives. The player controls a special forces soldier codenamed Nomad. The player's weapons can be customized without pausing the flow of time, for example changing firing modes, changing scopes or adding sound suppressors.

The player is also capable of selecting various modes in Nomad's military "Nanosuit" which draw power from the suit's energy. When the suit's energy is depleted, no modes can be used and the player is more vulnerable to damage before the suit recharges. One of four modes can be selected: Armor deflects damage and recharges the suit's energy faster; Strength allows stronger hand-to-hand combat, the ability to throw objects and enemies with deadly force, higher jumps, steadier aiming and reduced weapon recoil; Speed increases running and swimming speed, as well as other forms of motion such as reloading weapons; and Cloak, which renders Nomad almost completely invisible and suppresses movement noise.

The suit's integral facemask has its own HUD, displaying typical data including a tactical map, health, current energy levels, and weapons information. The view is electronic in nature, shown in-game through things such as a booting readout and visual distortion during abnormal operation. A particularly useful utility is the binocular function, which allows the player to zoom in and electronically tag enemies and vehicles from afar, thereby tracking their movement on the tactical display.

The player can engage enemies in a variety of ways; using stealth or aggression, bullets or non-lethal tranquilizers, ranged rifles or short-range weaponry, and so on. Enemy soldiers employ tactical maneuvers and work as squads. All soldiers will respond to noise caused by the player, including using signal flares to call for reinforcements. If the player has not been detected in the area, enemies will exhibit relaxed behaviour, but if aware of the player they will draw weapons and become combative.

=== Weapons ===
The game features assault rifles, sub-machine guns, pistols, missile launchers, shotguns, miniguns, sniper rifles, gauss rifles (coilguns), the MOAC (a machine gun style alien weapon which fires high-velocity ice shards), and the TAC gun (a hand-held nuclear grenade launcher). Most weapons can be modified with attachments; these attachments may be given to the player by default, acquired from picked-up weapons, or purchased in multiplayer. Attachment options are given a fair amount of leeway even if the result may seem strange. For instance, a 4x/10x sniper scope can be attached to the buckshot-firing shotgun, though there might be no practical use for such a particular combination. Additionally, most weapons have multiple firing modes (single/automatic fire) and different ammo types; for example, the KPA's FY-71 can fire both conventional bullets as well as incendiary bullets, which increase damage. Crysis also incorporates some features that have appeared in other recent shooters such as accounting for already-chambered rounds when a reload occurs.

=== Vehicles ===
A large selection of vehicles are present, most of which are usable by the player. Available ground vehicles range from pickup trucks to tanks, while naval vessels range from motorboats to light military hovercraft. A larger patrol boat is available in custom-made multiplayer maps using the sandbox editor. All vehicles, including Humvees, pickup trucks, even tanks, have a turbo mode that can be activated via the Shift key (by default). The aircraft selection is limited to the North Korean attack helicopter and a fictional American VTOL (each of which can transport six passengers and two crew). Crytek also included an amphibious armored personnel carrier, its wheeled version that can travel on water and land, although this vehicle was only available for those who pre-ordered the game.

Damage modeling, although limited in vehicles, is most noticeable in the ability to burst tires, although wheeled vehicles can still move even if all the tires are gone, slowly rolling along on the rims. Tracked vehicles such as tanks or APCs can lose their tracks as a result of damage, but may continue moving even though there is no way for the drive sprockets to propel the vehicle. Exposed gas cans on Humvees can be shot in order to detonate their contents, which usually results in the explosion of the vehicle. While burning, destroyed vehicles will cause proximity heat damage to objects and characters. Unavailable vehicles shown in-game include jet aircraft, excavator, forklift and for reasons of scale, destroyers. None of the alien machines can be commandeered by players. The wheeled carts which would presumably be used to move aircraft or heavy vehicles, can also be moved by the player, but movement is very slow and useful for little more than entertainment and novelty.

=== Multiplayer ===
Up to 32 players are supported in each multiplayer match in Crysis multiplayer, which used the GameSpy Network and required the user to have an existing user ID or otherwise create a new one. There are two different modes, each with six available maps: Instant Action, a deathmatch type mode; and Power Struggle, which is played by two opposing teams, each trying to destroy the other's headquarters.

Power Struggle features the American soldiers fighting the North Koreans; both sides, however, have nanosuits. All players begin armed with only a pistol and a nanosuit. Weapons and vehicles can be found throughout the map, but generally must be bought by using "Prestige Points," which are earned by killing enemies or capturing buildings.

The aim of Power Struggle is to destroy the enemy headquarters, a task which is achieved using nuclear weapons in the form of a TAC Tank, a TAC launcher, or by using a Singularity Tank, which generates a temporary black hole in the target area. To gain access to nuclear or singularity weapons, the player must first capture the "prototype facility" which is used to make them, and then use the alien crash sites which feed the facility with energy necessary to build up enough energy to build weapons of mass destruction.

One must earn Prestige Points, attained by killing enemies and taking over Bunkers, Power Stations, and Factories, to buy weapons and vehicles, including any of the aforementioned superweapons. Some of the weapons available in the game are machine guns, pistols, a shotgun, a precision rifle, ammo, a rocket launcher, explosives, and a gauss rifle (a sniper-type weapon able to kill another player in one shot).

The advanced weapons available for purchase from the Prototype Factory (aside from nuclear and singularity weapons) require 50% energy. Weapons the player can buy are the handheld minigun, the MOAC which has infinite ammo and fires ice shards, and the MOAR, which is an upgrade that can be attached to the MOAC causing it to fire a beam that will instantly freeze all enemies and some vehicles.

Capture The Flag, originally planned to be included in the game, is no longer part of the game mode line up, due to its similarity to Power Struggle. Even so, Jack Mamais, lead designer, stated that Crytek hopes that this mode will be developed by the modding community. Crytek CEO Cevat Yerli also said that Team Action would not be included as a multiplayer mode, because players would gravitate toward either Instant Action, or Power Struggle.

On April 14, 2014, Crytek announced that the multiplayer mode would be unplayable after GameSpy switched off its servers on May 30, 2014.

== Plot ==
The game begins on August 7, 2020, when North Korean forces led by General Ri-Chan Kyong take control of the Lingshan Islands. A team of American civilian archaeologists, led by Dr. Rosenthal, sends out a distress call indicating that they have discovered something that could change the world. A week later, United States Army Delta Force's Raptor Team is dispatched to the islands, with the core mission of evacuating them and securing any valuable information that they have. The team consists of Nomad, Psycho, Aztec, Jester, and team leader Prophet (all under code names); they are outfitted with technologically advanced Nanosuits, which help protect them from gunfire and explosions, as well as giving them superhuman strength and abilities. As they perform a high-altitude jump onto one of the islands, an unknown flying entity disrupts the jump by smashing into Nomad, and the team is separated. The crash deactivates Nomad's Nanosuit and destroys his parachute, but he is saved because he lands in the water and his nanosuit absorbs the impact. Once he reaches shore, Prophet remotely resets Nomad's suit, restoring its normal functions.

As Raptor Team regroups after the jump, Aztec is killed by an unknown entity. When the team finds him, they discover that whatever killed him also killed and dismembered a nearby squad of KPA soldiers. The remaining members of Raptor Team proceed with the mission. Along the way, they discover the hostages' boat frozen on a hill near the coast of the island. They also get their first look at the aliens who have been attacking their team when a flying alien machine sneaks up on them and snatches Jester, killing him shortly thereafter. The first hostage the team rescues turns out to be a CIA agent who was sent to monitor Dr. Rosenthal's work. In the jungle, Nomad finds another hostage named Badowski dead with ice shards in his back as the KPA battle an alien machine nearby. After Nomad regroups with Prophet, Prophet is suddenly snatched by another flying machine, which carries him away in its grasp. Shortly after, Nomad is contacted over the radio by Major Clarence Strickland of the American military, asking if he wishes to abort the mission since most of his team has been killed or missing; Nomad refuses, saying that he can still complete the mission.

Nomad makes his way to Dr. Rosenthal's research complex, where he finds a rare fossilized artifact predating humanity by two million years. The partially excavated artifact resembles one of the flying machines (designated "exosuits") that have been attacking the team. Rosenthal also references other discoveries of similar artifacts in Afghanistan and Siberia, suggesting that the aliens have a global presence rather than being confined to the island. While Rosenthal is scanning the artifact, it emits a powerful energy pulse that freezes him solid, while Nomad's Nanosuit maintains his internal temperature, saving his life. Nomad then rendezvous with a VTOL, after eliminating a Nanosuit-equipped four-man KPA special forces team near the landing site. He notifies his superiors about this because the U.S. military had hoped to prevent the Koreans from acquiring Nanosuit technology.

The U.S. military then begins a full-scale invasion of the island, led by Major Strickland. As U.S. forces continue toward the main excavation site, the central mountain on the island begins to collapse, revealing a huge alien structure inside, nearly the size of the mountain itself. Nomad enters the excavation site at the mountain's base, but is captured by Kyong's men. Kyong deactivates Nomad's Nanosuit, and Nomad watches, helpless, as Kyong shoots one of the hostages in the head and then detonates explosive charges to open the structure. An energy pulse emanates from the structure, killing Kyong's men and reactivating Nomad's Nanosuit. Kyong, also wearing a Nanosuit, attacks Nomad, but Nomad is able to kill him. As the mountain continues to collapse, a VTOL evacuates the last hostage, Dr. Rosenthal's daughter, Helena, but is unable to rescue Nomad.

Nomad gets trapped and decides to continue into the alien structure, which soon becomes a zero-gravity environment. Nomad uses his hydro-thrusters to maneuver and encounters hostile, intelligent aliens. He also sees a possible invasion force consisting of many alien machines. Nomad manages to escape, but the structure creates a massive sphere of energy that freezes everything inside its structure to -200 °F (-129 °C). Once outside, Nomad is attacked by various Alien machines before finding Prophet. Prophet was able to engineer a weapon using the aliens' technology, the Molecular Accelerator (MOAC). Prophet's Nanosuit malfunctions, requiring him to frequently stop and recharge using heat sources, such as the burning wrecks of military vehicles. The two leave the ice sphere and rescue Helena, whose VTOL has crashed. Prophet leaves with Helena on another VTOL. At the U.S. evacuation point, one of the last VTOLs rescues Nomad from an unstoppable quadrupedal alien exosuit. Just as the exosuit is about to destroy the VTOL, Major Strickland draws its attention by firing at it using a mounted machine gun, and the exosuit kills Strickland instead. As they leave the island, the pilot is killed, and the engines are damaged. Nomad flies the crippled VTOL back to the USS Constitution (CVN-80) Carrier Strike Group while fighting off aliens along the way.

Once there, he meets up with Psycho again and is debriefed by Admiral Richard Morrison, who explains that a nuclear strike has been ordered against the ice sphere. Helena warns him that the aliens might absorb the energy, but the Admiral ignores her. Prophet flies a VTOL back to the island against orders. Despite Prophet's departure, the nuclear missile is launched at the ice sphere. The explosion causes the ice sphere to expand, prompting a massive alien counterattack.

Nomad is ordered to repair one of the carrier's damaged nuclear reactors. The Nanosuit is resistant to high levels of radiation, although prolonged exposure proves deadly. While Nomad is in the reactor room, Helena sends an experimental signal through Nomad's suit, causing several alien machines to absorb too much power and overload, destroying them. As Nomad returns to the carrier's flight deck, Admiral Morrison is killed, and Nomad takes the prototype TAC-Cannon. On the flight deck, Nomad fights an alien exosuit similar to the one that killed Strickland. A massive alien warship then emerges from the sea, and Helena manages to deactivate its shields by sending a signal through Nomad's Nanosuit. Nomad then uses the TAC-Cannon to destroy the alien warship, which crashes down onto the carrier and begins to sink it. Nomad runs across the flight deck and jumps off the carrier into the waiting VTOL, which Psycho pilots. As they fly away, Helena is nearly pulled out of the aircraft by the energy field created by the destroyed alien warship. The ship drags the Constitution beneath the surface and vaporizes, creating a massive vortex that engulfs and destroys the entire carrier fleet. Psycho then receives a transmission that another carrier strike group is en route to the island and suggests meeting them. Nomad protests, claiming that since they now know how to defeat the aliens, they need to continue fighting. A transmission from Prophet, who is inside the energy field on the island, is then received. The VTOL is then seen turning around and heading back to the island.

== Development ==
=== Game engine ===
Gameplay screenshot showing Crysis' volumetric lighting effects. The game's graphics drew considerable praise.

Crysis uses Microsoft's Direct3D API for graphics rendering, and includes the same editor that was used by Crytek to create the game. The game runs on a new engine (CryEngine 2) that is the successor to Far Cry's CryEngine. CryEngine 2 was among the first engines to use the Direct3D 10 (DirectX 10) framework of Windows Vista, but was designed primarily to run using DirectX 9, both on Vista and Windows XP.

Roy Taylor, Vice President of Content Relations at Nvidia (at the time), has spoken on the subject of the engine's complexity, stating that Crysis has over a million lines of code (equivalent to nearly three thousand pages), 1 GB of texture data, and 85,000 shaders.

Crysis was often used as a benchmark in computer tests, as Crysis at the highest settings and resolutions required processing power from computers that was unfeasible when it was first released. In its time, the game was so demanding on previous computer hardware that the catchphrase "But can it run Crysis?" was frequently used in relation to new or powerful computer hardware, even over a decade after the release of Crysis.

=== Demo ===
On August 27, 2007, Crytek announced that a single-player demo would be released on September 25; however, the date was pushed back to October 26. The demo featured the entire first level, Contact, as well as the sand box editor. On October 26, Crytek announced that the demo would be postponed for at least one more day, and it was released to the public on October 27. However, on many sites it was provided a day early, and an oversight allowed people to grab the file directly off an EA server earlier than intended.

Shortly after the demo's release some enthusiasts found that, by manipulating the configuration files, most of the "very high" graphics settings (normally reserved for DX10) could be activated under DX9. The "very high" DX9 graphics mode looks almost identical to the DX10 mode, with certain graphical features not being able to be reproduced correctly under DX9, such as Object Motion Blur.

=== Sandbox editor ===
Crysis contains a level editor called Sandbox, much like Far Cry's, in which new levels can be created and edited. Such levels will have full support in all multiplayer modes. This will allow the player to easily build their own levels, seeing everything in real time within the editor. The player can also jump into the map they are working on at any time to test it. The editor is the same one that was used by Crytek to create the game.

== Release ==
=== Special Edition ===
The limited or collector's edition of Crysis is called Special Edition. The three-disc Crysis Special Edition contains the following:

- SteelBook casing (not available in North American version)
- Crysis game DVD
- Crysis Bonus Content DVD including:
  - "Making of Crysis" and "Meet the Developers" featurette
  - Initial Crysis concept video
  - Additional "key trailers"
  - Showreel of original concept and production artwork
  - High-resolution screenshots
  - Storyboards
- A 28-page game manual
- A 16-page concept art booklet
- An exclusive in-game multiplayer "Amphibious APC" vehicle
- Official soundtrack CD by composer Inon Zur

The South African release also included:

- An EA Crysis T-shirt

=== Crysis Warhead ===
Crysis was announced to be the first game in a trilogy by Crytek. Despite this, the next game released under the Crysis name was not the second chapter in the trilogy. Released for Microsoft Windows on September 16, 2008, in North America and September 19, 2008, in Europe, Crysis Warhead is a stand-alone expansion that allows the player to play the story told in the original Crysis, but this time from the viewpoint of Sgt. Michael Sykes, also known as "Psycho". The multiplayer element in Crysis Warhead is now called Crysis Wars.

=== Console versions ===
In July 2011, it was revealed that both the ESRB and the equivalent Korean ratings board had rated the original Crysis for the Xbox 360 and PlayStation 3. On September 8, 2011, a trailer with real-time in-game footage was released on Crytek's Twitter page. It showed brand new features for consoles including all new lighting, new effects and new Nanosuit controls, fine-tuned combat and full stereoscopic 3D support. This version is download-only. Crytek CEO Cevat Yerli said: "We are extremely proud of what we were able to accomplish with Crysis. We set out to create a next-generation FPS and delivered a PC experience that became a benchmark for quality - and still is for many gamers even four years later. By bringing the single-player campaign to console, we believe we are again setting a new standard for quality in downloadable gaming." However, unlike the original, the Xbox 360 and PlayStation 3 versions of the game lack the online multiplayer component as well as the second to last Campaign mission titled "Ascension". Also, neither Warhead nor Wars expansions are included. It was released on October 4, 2011.

=== Crysis Remastered ===
On April 16, 2020, Crytek announced that a remastered version of the game, titled Crysis Remastered would be released for the Xbox One, PlayStation 4, Nintendo Switch, and PC, featuring new graphical assets, effects, and software-based ray tracing. The remaster was originally intended for a simultaneous release on PlayStation 4, Nintendo Switch, Xbox One, and PC, and a trailer was scheduled for release on July 1, 2020. However, in the days previous to the trailer's release, the trailer itself and several screenshots were leaked, and were poorly received by the public for failing to provide any marked improvement over the original game. For this reason, come July 1, Crytek announced that except for the Switch, they would be postponing the release of Crysis Remastered for all platforms "by a few weeks" to improve its visual quality in an attempt to meet the users' expectations. The Switch version was announced on July 10 as coming out on July 23. On July 22, 2020, a tech analysis published by Digital Foundry, based on the Switch version, revealed that Remastered is not based on the original PC version of Crysis, but off the port (PlayStation 3/Xbox 360). On August 21, 2020, a new tech trailer was released for Remastered, showcasing improved lighting, 8K textures, raytraced effects, and setting the release date for September 18, 2020. Given the remaster was based on the PS3 / Xbox 360 version of the game, the remaster lacked the level "Ascension" that was similarly missing from the console version. This level was added back to the game in the 2.0 update to the game, which was released on December 17, 2020.

== Reception ==
=== Critical reception ===
Reception

Aggregate score
Aggregator	Score
Metacritic	(PC) 91/100 (PS3) 81/100 (X360) 81/100; Remastered (PC) 69/100 (NS) 66/100 (PS4) 59/100 (XONE) 59/100

Review scores
Publication	Score
1Up.com	B+
Edge	9/10
Eurogamer	9/10
Game Informer	9/10
GamePro	4.75/5
GameSpot	9.5/10
GameSpy	4.5/5
GameTrailers	8.8/10
IGN	(PC) 9.4/10 (PS3/X360) 8/10
PC Gamer (US)	98%
PC Zone	92%
X-Play	3/5
EGC Games	88/100

Awards
Publication	Award
GameSpot	2007 Best Shooter
PC Gamer	2007 Game of the Year
Gamereactor	2007 Best Action Game

Upon its release, Crysis was met with critical acclaim. Review aggregator website Metacritic rated the PC version 91/100, the Xbox 360 version 81/100, and the PlayStation 3 version 81/100. The game was awarded a 98% in the PC Gamer U.S. Holiday 2007 issue, making it one of the highest-rated games ever in PC Gamer, tying with Half-Life 2 and Sid Meier's Alpha Centauri. GameSpot awarded Crysis a score of 9.5 out of 10, describing it as "easily one of the greatest shooters ever made". Shawn Elliott of 1Up.com gave the game a B+, praising the graphics and presentation but criticizing the last third of the game: "beautiful throughout, mostly amazing, but vegetative by the end." GameSpy gave it a 4.5 out of 5 stating that the suit powers were fun but also criticizing the multiplayer portion of the game for not having a team deathmatch. X-Play gave it a 3 out of 5 on its "Holiday Buyer's Guide" special episode, praising the graphics and physics, but criticized the steep hardware requirements as well as stating that the game is overhyped with average gameplay. GamePro honored Crysis with a score of 4.75 out of 5, saying it was "a great step forward for PC gaming", but criticized the steep hardware requirements. IGN awarded it a 9.4 out of 10, hailing it as "one of the more entertaining ballistic showdowns in quite some time". A retrospective review for bit-tech.net in June 2010 criticized the game for failing to deliver on its pre-release promise, saying that the art direction was "boring and monotonous", that the nanosuit was underwhelming and that the plot could be summarized as "Rescue these people who look to be being held captive by Koreans. Oh no Aliens!" The review concluded by saying, "Crysis was the epitome of style over substance."

=== Sales ===
According to The simExchange, the NPD Group reported that Crysis moved 86,633 retail units in the first two weeks of its release in North America, but while it beat their expectations, the sales were considered disappointing overall. Two months later, on Electronic Arts' earnings conference of the quarter, it was reported that Crysis had reached the 1 million units mark, and that it had exceeded their expectations. It received a "Silver" sales award from the Entertainment and Leisure Software Publishers Association (ELSPA), indicating sales of at least 100,000 copies in the United Kingdom.

On the other hand, Cevat Yerli stated during an interview with PC Play in April 2008 that he was disappointed to see the game leading the charts in piracy and because of that his studio would not produce any more PC exclusives, as he believed a game such as Crysis would sell four to five times more copies if it was released on consoles. Die Welt likewise reported that piracy had left the game with disappointing sales by April. Piracy figures released by TorrentFreak indicate that Crysis was indeed one of the most-pirated PC games of the year. In June 2008, Cevat stated that while their hopes had not been met, the game had reached their real expectations and in August he added that despite its $22 million budget the game had turned profitable for them. By May 2010, the game had sold over 3 million units (and its standalone expansion about 1.5 million units), making it one of the best-selling PC games of all time.

=== Awards ===
GameSpot awarded Crysis "Best Shooter" in its "Best of 2007" awards, saying that "It was this open-ended, emergent gameplay – the ability to let us tackle our challenges in whatever way we wished." They also awarded it with "Best Graphics: Technical" and "Best PC Game" stating that "The firefights in the game are beautiful to look at, but extremely intense affairs that force you to think quickly – and reward you for doing so. It's a dynamic game, one that you can play several times to discover new things and to experiment with different approaches." PC Gamer awarded Crysis its "Game of the Year" and "Action Game of the Year" in its March 2008, "Games of the Year Awards" issue. PC Gamer also remarked that "Crysis has pushed PC gaming to a new plateau, marrying the most advanced graphics engine ever created with phenomenal gameplay. From the cinematic opening to credits to its cliffhanger ending, Crysis is mesmerizing." Gamereactor gave Crysis a perfect ten, and awarded it with its "Best Action Game of 2007", saying that "the action genre is forever changed". IGN awarded Crysis its "Editor's Choice Award", saying that "the Halo 2-type ending ... wasn't enough to deter me from heartily recommending action fans pick this one up." During the 11th Annual Interactive Achievement Awards, the Academy of Interactive Arts & Sciences awarded Crysis with "Outstanding Achievement in Visual Engineering", along with receiving nominations for "Computer Game of the Year" and "Action Game of the Year".

=== Legacy ===
At the time of its release, Crysis was one of the most demanding games available in terms of hardware requirements. This caused the phrase "Can it run Crysis?" (a questioning of whether personal computer systems with the best-possible hardware could run the game at its maximum quality and resolution settings) to become an Internet meme. The phrase was applied jokingly to non-gaming computers (such as NASA mainframes) or historical computing hardware (such as ENIAC). Later Crysis games dropped some of the most demanding rendering features of the game engine, thus making the "Can it run Crysis?" question moot. Honoring this aspect of the original game, the highest detail level in the PC version of Crysis Remastered is called "Can it Run Crysis?".

== Sequels ==
On May 30, 2009, Crytek announced the second chapter in the Crysis trilogy, which continued where the first game ended. Released on March 22, 2011, Crysis 2 was developed for Microsoft Windows, PlayStation 3 and Xbox 360. In addition to seeking a United States trademark on the name Crysis, Crytek sought to trademark the names Crysis Wars, World in Crysis, and Crysis Warhead. On April 16, 2012, EA and Crytek announced that Crysis 3 was in development. The game was released in February 2013. The next Crysis installment was announced in 2022.
