= Crysis Warhead =

2008 video game

- Developer: Crytek Budapest
- Publisher: Electronic Arts
- Director: Cevat Yerli
- Producer: Bernd Diemer
- Designer: Attila Bánki Horváth
- Programmers: Denisz Polgár; Attila Márton
- Artist: Gábor Mogyorósi
- Writer: Tim Partlett
- Composers: Péter Antovszki; Inon Zur
- Series: Crysis
- Engine: CryEngine 2
- Platform: Microsoft Windows
- Release: NA: 16 September 2008; NA: 17 September 2008 (Steam); EU: 19 September 2008; AU: 25 September 2008
- Genre: First-person shooter
- Modes: Single-player, multiplayer

Crysis Warhead is a 2008 first-person shooter game developed by Crytek Budapest and published by Electronic Arts. Crysis Warhead is a stand-alone expansion game and does not require the installation of the original Crysis to play.

== Gameplay ==
Crysis Warhead updates and refines the gameplay of the original game through a side-plot parallel to that of the original Crysis game. The story follows Sergeant Michael "Psycho" Sykes, an ally of Crysis protagonist Nomad, as he faces his own trials and challenges on the other side of the island during the time period of the first game. It features new fully customizable weapons, vehicles and enemies, along with new multiplayer content. It also showcases a new, enhanced and optimized version of CryEngine 2 and is the first game developed by Crytek's Budapest studio. Psycho's arsenal of futuristic weapons builds on those showcased in Crysis, with the introduction of Mini-SMGs which can be dual-wielded, a six-shot grenade launcher equipped with EMP grenades, and the destructive, short ranged Plasma Accumulator Cannon (PAX). The highly versatile Nanosuit, which confers various superhuman abilities upon its wearer, returns.

=== Crysis Wars ===
In addition to the single-player campaign, Crytek has also emphasized the multiplayer modes, titled Crysis Wars. In addition to the Instant Action and Power Struggle modes of the original Crysis, Crysis Warhead also features Team Instant Action mode, as well as 21 playable maps upon release. Crytek has made numerous changes to the multiplayer gameplay including tighter vehicle controls, weapon rebalancing, and Nanosuit alterations. Crysis Wars is included on its own disc, has a separate installer and logo, and is considered a separate game by Crytek; regardless, it comes bundled with Warhead at no additional charge. From 10 to 12 October 2008, Crytek held a free trial weekend during which people could download and play Crysis Wars for free.

== Plot ==
In 2020, an ancient alien spacecraft is uncovered on the North Korean-occupied Lingshan Islands, east of the Philippines. British SAS Sergeant Michael "Psycho" Sykes is a member of the Raptor Team, a squad of mostly U.S. soldiers outfitted with advanced nanotechnology. Sykes splits up with his team following a raid on a North Korean-controlled harbor. He witnesses a North Korean warship being bombarded by U.S. Navy fighter jets. Leaving the shore, he joins a Marine vehicle convoy driving through the jungle, and defends it as it is attacked by North Korean soldiers. The convoy is destroyed and the Marines fight into the night. The VTOL transport that tries to evacuate the destroyed convoy's Marines is hit by a missile and crash-lands. Psycho awakes and goes to find a better position for the surviving Marines, but gets attacked by an EMP blast from a container being lifted away by a North Korean helicopter. Psycho is later assigned a mission to pursue another North Korean container that JSOC believes contains a nuclear warhead. As the mission progresses, Psycho is reunited with friend U.S. Navy fighter pilot Sean O'Neill who was originally going to have Nomad's spot on Raptor Team. He was replaced by Nomad after failing an evaluation test. Psycho, against the wishes of Commander Emmerson, helps O'Neill after his F-35 jet is shot down, and takes him to a VTOL to escape.

Psycho fights through the jungle and coastlines against the North Korean military to track down the container and stop them from taking it. After he reaches a cargo submarine, he sees what's inside. Rather than a nuclear warhead, the container houses an alien war machine, which knocks Psycho out with an EMP blast. After he wakes up again, he is captured and tortured by the North Koreans. As the submarine submerges, the island is suddenly flash-frozen while mechanical alien "Exosuits" attack. Psycho pursues Colonel Lee Kim Sun through the frozen waters and valleys, eventually meeting up with another nanosuit team on the island, Eagle Team. Psycho and Eagle Team continue the pursuit, fighting off an enormous walking Exosuit. Eagle Team is separated from Psycho in a mine, while Psycho continues searching for the container. After reaching an underground train station, Psycho is ordered to get on the train the container is loaded on. Emerging above ground, Psycho fights off both North Korean soldiers and aliens trying to reclaim the container, while O'Neill assists him.

Psycho is ordered to destroy the container if he cannot capture it, and the train is stopped on a bridge which is rigged with explosives in case he needs to do so. Before the container can be extracted by friendly forces, Colonel Lee arrives and uses a captured U.S. Marine as a hostage to bait Psycho off the train, and Psycho loses the detonator while saving him. The Marine pleads with Psycho to drop him so Psycho can retrieve the detonator and destroy the container. Colonel Lee manages to escape with the container before the explosives can be detonated. Although Psycho survives the fall, the Marine, who was not wearing an armored nanosuit, does not. He takes out his rage on an injured nanosuited North Korean soldier he pulled off the bridge with him, and drowns him in the river. Struck with grief for not saving the life of the Marine, Psycho has an emotional breakdown, but regains his composure in order to finish his mission.

Psycho assaults the North Korean-occupied airfield where the container is waiting to be taken off the island, taking out numerous ground forces and North Korean tanks. O'Neill returns in a VTOL, and assists Psycho in destroying an upgraded Exosuit walker by guiding him to a crashed U.S. Air Force cargo plane, which was transporting a powerful experimental weapon, the PAX (Plasma Accumulator Cannon), which allows him to fight off the initial wave of attackers. As the two are about to start extracting the container, Colonel Lee shows up again to reclaim the container, holding O'Neill at gunpoint. Lee tries to shoot O'Neill, but O'Neill is shielded by a cloaked Psycho, who begins fighting with Lee as O'Neill retakes control of the VTOL and takes the container. Psycho and Lee begin fighting inside of the VTOL, and Psycho gains the upper hand, knocking Lee out of the back onto the tarmac, leaving him to the mercy of a massive alien warship. O'Neill takes off with the container, as Psycho relaxes in the back.

Throughout the game, audio clips from four years before the game takes place are heard. These clips show brief glimpses into how O'Neill failed his evaluation test probably causing the death of some other squad mate as can be guessed by the fact that Psycho says "Man Down". The dead squad mate might be the nephew of Dominic H. Lockhart, commander of the Crynet Enforcement & Local Logistics (CELL). If so, this episode is probably the cause of Lockhart's grief for the nanosuits as seen in Crysis 2. The final clip reveals a brief conversation between Psycho and Nomad at the end of Nomad's own, successful evaluation. Psycho asks Nomad if he is okay, to which Nomad replies "Did you disarm the warhead?" Psycho does not reply to the question, instead saying "That's my Nomad - always putting the mission first."

== Development ==
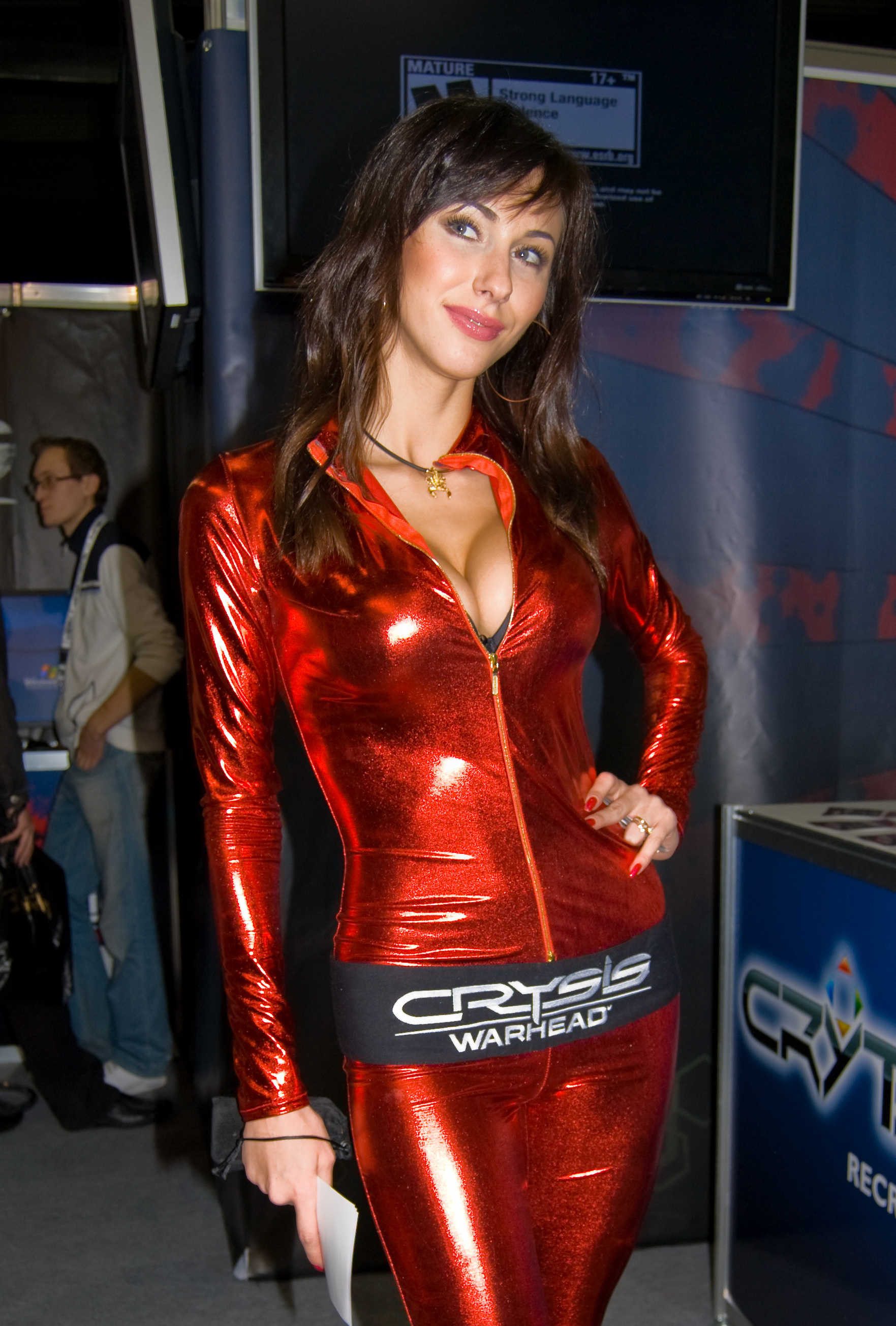
Promotion at Games Territory 2008 in Kyiv

Crysis Warhead was announced on 5 June 2008 and was announced as a stand-alone expansion pack to Crysis. Crysis Warhead retails at less than normal games' recommended retail price though the game's feature set is close to those featured in full-priced games.

The developers claimed that due to optimizations of CryEngine2, Crysis Warhead performs better than the original Crysis. Like Crysis, Warhead uses Microsoft Direct3D for graphics rendering. Nevertheless, Crysis Warhead looks better graphically and runs better than the original Crysis.

EA announced that the game's minimum requirements are nearly identical to the minimum requirements of the original Crysis (except for the HDD capacity, which is now 15 GB). However, the "Gamer" and "Enthusiast" ("High" and "Very High", respectively, in the original Crysis) configurations require less powerful machines than before (as IGN confirmed in their review), allowing a user to run the "Enthusiast" settings in DirectX 9 mode (and on Windows XP).

Crytek announced on November 11, 2018, that the game's software installation tool would switch from InstallShield to InstallAware.

=== Digital rights management ===
Crysis Warhead uses a modified version of the digital rights management software SecuROM as copy prevention, which requires authentication on installation and when online access is used. It can be installed up to five times on a limited number of machines and hardware configurations before the user must contact EA to reset their install count. EA has released an installation revoke tool which allows users to de-authorize their Crysis Warhead installations. Later, Crytek increased the activation limit to 50.

The game is known to have a fairly amusing copy protection mechanism that turns all live ammunition in a pirated copy, whether fired from the player or enemies, into chickens that inflict no damage and a small amount of knockback.

Eventually, both Crysis and Crysis Warhead released DRM-free on digital storefront GOG.com.

== Reception ==
Reception

Aggregate score
Aggregator	Score
Metacritic	84/100

Review scores
Publication	Score
Computer and Video Games	9.2/10
Eurogamer	9/10
Game Informer	8.75/10
GamePro	4.5/5
GameSpot	9/10
GameSpy	3.5/5
IGN	9.4/10
PC PowerPlay	7/10
Total PC Gaming	9/10

Crysis Warhead received largely positive reviews. Most reviewers praised the improvements over the original Crysis in areas like AI and gameplay pacing, citing the original game's criticism that battles were few and far between. The new protagonist, Psycho, was also received better than the original's less developed Nomad. The revamped multiplayer mode, Crysis Wars, was also praised for adding a team deathmatch mode, the lack of which most reviewers criticised in the original game.

Criticism of the game by reviewers includes the short story mode and a lack of new features over the original game. Some continue to cite the game's high system requirements as unacceptable even a year after the original game, which has the same requirements. Indeed, some reviewers did not see any significant performance improvement with Warhead compared with Crysis, stating that only high-end GPUs could handle the game comfortably at decent frame rates.

Crysis Warhead was featured among Electronic Arts's line-up at E3 2008. In IGN's "PC Best of E3 2008 Awards" it won for "Best First Person Shooter", "Best Graphics Technology" and received a nomination for "Special Achievement for Technological Excellence". IGN also nominated it for "Best Graphics Technology" in their "Overall Best of E3" awards.

In GameSpot's "Best of 2008", the game was nominated for "Best Graphics, Technical", "Best Shooter" and "Best PC Game".
