= Marco Corbetta =

Video game programmer (born 1977)

Marco Corbetta (born June 16, 1977) is a game programmer, notable for his work as lead programmer of CryEngine, Far Cry and Crysis franchise. Corbetta also wrote the 3D engine known as Equinox, before his time at Prograph Research, where he is credited for Tsunami 2265 (2002) (distributed in the US by Got Game Entertainment). He is currently a director on Star Citizen.
