= East India Company (video game) =

2009 video game

- Developer: Nitro Games
- Publisher: Paradox Interactive
- Designer: Kim Soares
- Platform: Microsoft Windows
- Release: NA: July 31, 2009; EU: August 14, 2009
- Genre: Real-time strategy
- Modes: Single-player, multiplayer

East India Company is a real-time strategy video game developed by Finnish company Nitro Games and published by Paradox Interactive. It was released on July 31, 2009 in North America and on August 14, 2009 in Europe.

The game is based on the history of European conquest of South Asia and Southeast Asia by means of their East India Companies. In the game, the player takes on the role of the Governor Director of the East Indies. The task is to conquer India and establish a trade empire to rule over all others.

The game features real-time naval combat when enemy ships engage the player's fleets, and real-time land combat when the enemy tries to invade one of the player's colonies. East India Company combines trading, naval warfare, and management. Players can create a fleet to conquer the enemy with powerful warships and privateers.

== Gameplay ==
There are eight playable nations to choose from: the Great Britain, France, the Netherlands, Portugal, Denmark, Sweden, Holy Roman Empire and Spain. Tasks may be given by the company or the crown to do various missions including diplomacy, war, and trade. The game is mainly based in the Indian subcontinent.

There are 11 ship types in the game, including the schooner, sloop, brig, East Indiaman, frigate, and ship of the line.

== Development ==
A Designer's Cut was made available for download on October 27, 2009. It offers several additional features.

== Reception ==
The game was met with mixed reviews, with an average of 67% on Metacritic. IGN said that "players who are interested in the concept or the period will definitely find a worthwhile game here, but the appeal wears thin long before it should have". IT Reviews agreed, stating that the game was "a fun short-term challenge, just lacking the depth of play to ensure a lengthy shelf life". Total PC Gaming magazine called it "an enjoyable trading and strategy experience, let down by lacklustre combat" (Issue 23).
