= Shadow Ops: Red Mercury =

2004 video game

- North American Xbox cover art
- Developer: Zombie Studios
- Publisher: Atari
- Director: Bill Wright
- Producer: Mark Long
- Designers: John E. Williamson; Richard Starr
- Programmer: Russell Nelson
- Artists: Shawn Mulanix; Eric Eye; Matt Rapelje; Laureen Lafave
- Writer: Neil Alphonso
- Composer: Inon Zur
- Engine: Unreal Engine 2
- Platforms: Xbox, Microsoft Windows
- Release: Xbox: NA: June 15, 2004; PAL: June 18, 2004; Microsoft Windows: NA: September 21, 2004; PAL: October 1, 2004
- Genre: First-person shooter
- Modes: Single-player, multiplayer

Shadow Ops: Red Mercury is a 2004 first-person shooter video game developed by Zombie Studios and published by Atari. It was released on the Xbox for the United States on June 15, 2004, and on June 18, 2004, in PAL regions. It was later released for Microsoft Windows in the United States on September 21, 2004, and on October 1, 2004 in PAL regions.

Tommo purchased the rights to this game and digitally published it through its Retroism brand in 2015.

== Gameplay ==
Shadow Ops: Red Mercury is an action-oriented first person shooter based on modern military weapons and equipment, although presented as a "summer action movie" rather than a hardcore realistic military simulation. It is similar in feel to the Call of Duty: Modern Warfare series, although it pre-dates the first game in that series by 3 years. Players proceed through linear levels while battling terrorists and hostile Russian soldiers, using an assortment of modern firearms.

Like many games from the time period, Shadow Ops: Red Mercury does not have regenerating health, with the player instead relying on health pickups found throughout each mission. At the beginning of each mission, the player is assigned 3 weapons (typically a sidearm, an assault rifle, and a special weapon such as a shotgun, sniper rifle, or light machine gun) and cannot obtain different weapons during the mission. The player can aim down their weapon's sights for increased accuracy (presented with a stylized zoom, the player relies on the crosshair and does not truly aim down the weapon's iron sights, although telescopic sights are utilized correctly from a first-person perspective); while aiming down sights the player is unable to move, but can lean in order to fire around corners or over cover. Combat options include firing the player's held weapon, throwing grenades, and melee attacks utilizing the butt of their firearm. One unique gameplay element is the ability to roll grenades along the floor, instead of simply throwing them through the air.

The game does not feature either a manual saving or a checkpoint saving system, meaning each individual level must be completed from beginning to end. However, completed levels can be re-visited at any time from the level selection menu.

== Plot ==
The player takes the role of Captain Frank Hayden, an elite Delta Force operative and the former leader of Black Saber, the President's personal black bag unit. Hayden and his team are attempting to recover a briefcase nuclear bomb code named "Red Mercury" from terrorist mercenary Vladimir Styanovich, known by his Nom de guerre "Vlady the Vicious", who is operating out of a coastal Syrian town. The team's Black Hawk is shot down immediately upon insertion, and they fight their way through the streets in pursuit of Vlady. Hayden is too late to stop Vlady from escaping via helicopter, but manages to damage the helicopter's rotors with small arms fire. Vlady, escaping over the ocean, states he is nobody's martyr, and attempts to disarm the nuke and "re-evaluate". To his dismay, the bomb rearms itself seconds later. Vlady leaves the bomb on the helicopter and leaps into the ocean in a futile attempt to escape the blast. The blast wave from the nuke kills Vlady and capsizes the U.S. aircraft carrier which had been Hayden's base of operations, as well as destroying the helicopter sent to extract Hayden's team, knocking them unconscious.

The plot then moves to 72 hours earlier, with Hayden and his team on a mission in the Congo jungle to destroy a cache of Stinger missiles being used by local guerillas to shoot down American supply planes. After the successful completion of the mission, Hayden is picked up by Central Intelligence Agency agent Kate Daniels and Russian Foreign Intelligence Service agent Yuri Entropov, who recruit him for a mission. They have information that Vlady has prepared to purchase a Red Mercury bomb from a Russian research facility in Kazakhstan, and want Hayden to infiltrate the facility and eliminate Vlady and the Red Mercury bomb. Yuri mentions he has an agent on the inside who has provided this information. Hayden HALO jumps into the area and sneaks into the facility, where he witnesses the deal between Vlady and the facility's chief scientist. He recognizes Vlady as Wesley Holden, a former member of Black Saber who lost an arm on a past mission and holds a grudge against Hayden as a result. Instead of the agreed payment, Vlady kills the scientist and escapes with the bomb. Hayden is too late to stop him, and discovers that Yuri's inside agent is Galena, a Russian spy who has a tumultuous past romantic history with Hayden.

Back at base, Kate is furious at Vlady's escape, while Hayden reveals Vlady's true identity as an American special forces operative. He learns that Vlady has, not one, but two Red Mercury bombs. Galena reveals that the Red Mercury bombs can only be armed through a chemical process known only to a scientist named Boris in Chechnya. Hayden and his team travel to Chechnya to stop Vlady, but are once again too late. Vlady has Boris arm the bombs, then kills him and escapes, leaving behind a boobytrap for Hayden. Hayden next pursues Vlady onto a Lebanese freighter, but is yet again unable to prevent Vlady's escape. However, he learns that Vlady is heading to Syria, and pursues him there.

The plot then returns to the opening mission, and proceeds as before up to the detonation of the Red Mercury bomb. In the aftermath of the nuclear explosion, Hayden regains consciousness just as he is being retrieved by the captain of the aircraft carrier, who informs him that his team has been killed, and that Yuri and Galena have possession of the second Red Mercury bomb and are on their way to the G8 summit in Paris, France, while Kate also left the carrier to pursue them. Hayden realizes that Vlady was just a distraction for Yuri and Galena's plot to assassinate the G8 world leaders.

Pursuing them onto a high speed train bound for France, Hayden discovers that Galena is a hostage, and that Kate is the mastermind behind the plot to kill the world leaders, with Yuri as her partner. Yuri declares his motives as allowing Russia to regain her former glory, but is abruptly killed by Kate, who indicates their motives are not the same. Kate simply wants to "shake things up" by killing the world leaders, whom she views as ineffectual and corrupt, and reset the world back to its roots. Hayden and Galena set out to stop her, with Hayden fighting his way alongside French RAID officers through Paris under siege from Kate's elite Russian troopers. Hayden confronts Kate in a climactic showdown on top of the Eiffel Tower, with Kate attacking from a circling attack helicopter. Kate is eventually struck by gunfire and falls from the helicopter to her death, dropping the Red Mercury bomb. Galena shows up to try and disarm the bomb; she succeeds in disabling the nuclear element, but the conventional explosives will still go off. Hayden and Galena escape to the bottom of the tower just as the bomb explodes at the top. The two of them share a kiss as a crowd of Parisians cheers them on.

== Reception ==
Shadow Ops: Red Mercury received "mixed or average" reviews, according to review aggregator Metacritic.
