= Music of Dragon Age: Origins =

Music from the video game Dragon Age: Origins

The music of Dragon Age: Origins, a role-playing video game developed by BioWare and published by Electronic Arts in 2009, was composed and arranged by Israeli American music composer Inon Zur and American singer-songwriter Aubrey Ashburn, and performed by the Northwest Sinfonia. The game features an orchestral soundtrack with a choir, used both in-game and during cutscenes. The score also features contributions from Simon Pressey, who was Audio Director at BioWare and acted as musical supervisor for the project, as well as vocal performances by Ashburn who had since become a frequent collaborator with Zur. Several vocal tracks were produced for the game, which were all performed by Ashburn. Zur intentionally made most of the soundtrack feel "dark" in synergy with the theme of Origins.

The official Dragon Age: Origins soundtrack album was released on November 3, 2009 and later released digitally on December 8, 2009. It won two awards at the Hollywood Music in Media Awards & Conference show held on November 19, 2009. An 18 track album was included in the Collector's Edition of the game which was released on November 3, 2009. The original video game score for the Dragon Age: Origins – Leliana's Song downloadable content pack was released on October 25, 2010.

== Production and composition ==
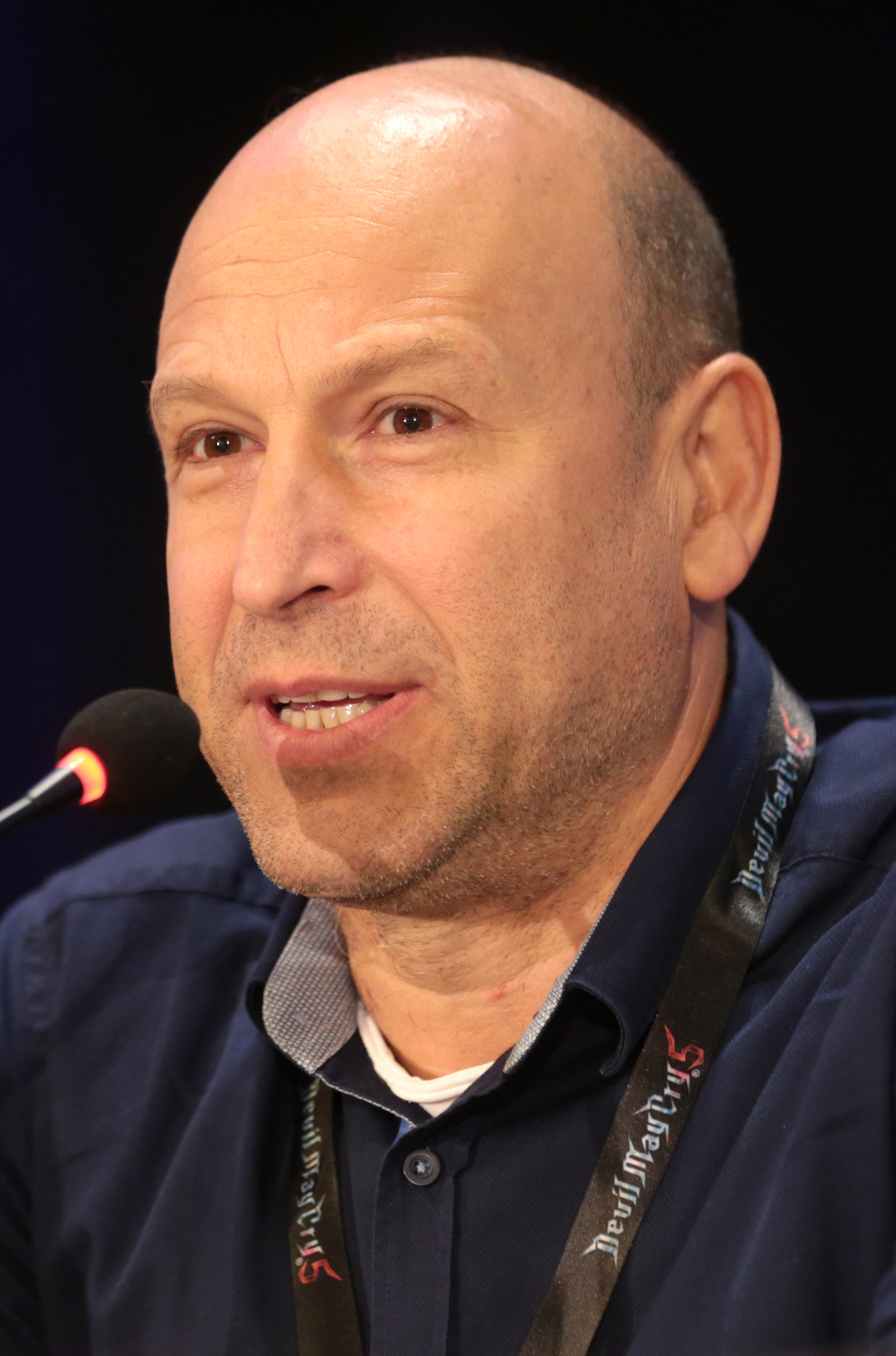
Inon Zur served as the game's composer.

Origins features an original score. The game's score accompanies the gameplay and alerts players at specific times such as combat sequences. Inon Zur explained in an interview with GameSpot that the main role of video game music, like its movie and television counterparts, is to support the emotional element and to enhance the drama. He said in another interview that he was enthusiastic about being asked to score the Dragon Age franchise by BioWare "because it was known to be a high profile project from a great developer", and it featured the elements he enjoys writing for, noting that in the role playing game (RPG) genre he can contribute a lot in his style to complement the game. Zur described the process of composing a scene for the series as follows: he starts by identifying and focusing on what exactly the characters in the scene are feeling, and then move on to other details such as their location, number of hostile enemies, the pace of the narrative, and so on. He would then proceed to write the score with the information he is provided, and at the same time he is open to other information such as the color and/or flavor of the setting. Zur described the creative process as being "a very close collaboration with a lot of creative freedom" and noted that the score for Origins was about creating its universe and establish a style for the game. They had to cover a lot of different stories for the game, which featured six possible origin stories for the player-created protagonist, and he had to go through many routes to find the origins and what they are. He said he plays the games he is hired to compose to comprehend its tempo and rhythm, which would inform his experience when it comes to tailoring his score. He noted that the story of a video game is the biggest influence in his score writing; he praised the narrative for Dragon Age as being very effective and immersive, noting that there are "lots of human elements, none of the characters are perfect, even the hero".

Zur said that the most memorable moment for him working on Dragon Age, was "trying to capture what's going on in the character's mind as opposed to the player's mind". He observed that the story of a RPG is typically more complicated compared to other genres like first-person shooter games, and that in Origins players get to make decisions all the time, such as siding with one faction over the other, which is influenced by their own opinions. Zur had to frame the player's feeling or to create a feeling by evoking sensations such as motivation, fear, or excitement because it is not possible to predict the exact manner in which players will respond to each scenario in Origins due to its branching narrative. He described scoring the Dragon Age games to be like "stepping on eggs" in that he needed to work with emotions without forcing it too much, and that he was careful not to compose the score in such a way that would manipulate the player into making a specific decision. Zur's finalized score for Origins is meant to evoke the feel of the game, which he described as "proud and beautiful" and "very dark, but also very epic and huge in size". Zur would balance the dark tone and mood of the score with occasional heartfelt music, or introduce comic relief as a prelude to a dark cue; he explained that, "there's a point when you’re painting a black canvas, going darker and darker, where it can lose impact". He described the sound palette established in Origins as orchestral, combining low brass and bass string instruments with ancient drums to express a feeling that is both heroic and demonic.

Aubrey Ashburn revealed in an interview with GameSpot that Origins was the first project Zur hired her for, and that the main Dragon Age: Origins theme Zur wrote was the piece that won him the contract to compose the game's score. Ashburn recalled experiencing a "sort of spiritual experience" while recording the song, and said she still enjoys listening to the song and won't change a thing about it. She noted that "Leliana's Song", misspelled as "Lelianna's song" on the official album track listing, was created early on in the process and it was "a slam-dunk type of piece" as a producer wanted a song for a very specific purpose. The writing team provided Zur and Aubrey with elven lyrics that indicated a certain phrasing; Aubrey noted that Zur came up with a context "almost instantly" and she only had to "coax the phrasing a bit and perform it". The song was composed in under 24 hours. Aubrey considered the song to be one of her favorite songs/performances. With regards to "Love Song", a track performed by Ashburn which plays when the player character engages a party companion in a romantic scene but was not included in any version of the soundtrack albums for Origins, she credited Zur with writing the music; together they placed the "pseudo-Elven" language she came up with and finished composing the song on relatively short notice. Though surprised by its positive reception, she noted that the song has "a certain vulnerability about it" that captures the listener.

The soundtrack was recorded by the performance of a 44-piece orchestra, recorded twice and merged to sound like an 88-piece orchestra. It was performed by the Northwest Sinfonia; one of the soundtrack's performers, woodwind soloist Chris Bleth, has worked on numerous notable films such as Up, Star Trek, X-Men Origins: Wolverine, and the Fast and the Furious series. The soundtrack was presented at a panel in the Hollywood Music in Media Interactive Conference in 2009 and was performed as part of the September 26 "A Night in Fantasia 2009" concert in Sydney, by the Eminence Symphony Orchestra.

== Albums ==
=== Dragon Age: Origins Official Soundtrack ===
Dragon Age: Origins Official Soundtrack

Soundtrack album by Inon Zur and Aubrey Ashburn
- Released: November 3, 2009; December 8, 2009 (digital)
- Genre: Video game soundtrack
- Length: 1:02:33
- Label: Electronic Arts

The Dragon Age: Origins Official Soundtrack comprises songs from the game, composed and produced by Inon Zur and Aubrey Ashburn, with supervision from Simon Pressey. The soundtrack spans 35 tracks, covering a duration of 1 hour 2 minutes and 33 seconds and features vocal performances by Asburn and a choir ensemble. The soundtrack for Origins was nominated for a few awards, including "Best Original Score – Video Game", at the 2009 Hollywood Music in Media Awards & Conference show and won two: "Best Original Song – Video Game" for "I Am The One", written by Inon Zur and Aubrey Ashburn and performed by Auburn, and "Outstanding Music Supervision – Video Game" for Simon Pressey. The soundtrack was also nominated for four awards, including "Music of the Year" and "Best Soundtrack Album", by the Game Audio Network Guild. A press release issued by Electronic Arts issued on September 24, 2009 stated that "the official soundtrack for Dragon Age: Origins will be available to purchase and download online from popular music sites when the game ships on November 3, 2009". The soundtrack was released digitally on December 8, 2009.

In his review of the official soundtrack for album Origins, Michael Anderson from GearDiary thought the score was overall "very well done, and generally suits the gameplay". He complimented Ashburn's "stirring vocals that hearken back to the excellent work of Lisbeth Scott on the Gothic 3 soundtrack". On the subject of value, he noted that the Deluxe (Collector's) version contains several tracks which are not included in the official soundtrack. He concluded that while he considers the business practice to be "lousy value from an objective standpoint" as two separate soundtrack albums must be owned to access the full experience, he conceded that "there are many worse ways to dispose of $8" for a fan of the Dragon Age series. Cat Spencer reviewed the soundtrack for Origins in her column Soundtrack Gamer. She thought the soundtrack serves its purpose and the music never overpowered her experience when she played the game, but it only "sparkles once or twice" with two outstanding tracks, "Lelianna's Song" (sic) and "I Am The One". She did not find the soundtrack as a whole memorable, noting that "its lack of defined motifs and melodies gave me a largely unremarkable experience", which to her is "a fairly typical example of incidental music and vague themes without any one element tying them all together". She concluded with the exception of four tracks, the album as a whole "lacks any real substance to stand on its own". Lisa Granshaw from SyFy.com said the soundtrack of Origins contains some of her favorite tracks ever featured in a video game. She praised Aubrey Ashburn's vocal performances, and that she "brilliantly captures the tone of Dragon Age in her songs", such as the high fantasy and dark fantasy versions of "I Am the One" and "Lelianna's Song", which prominently feature her singing. She recommended it for anyone who has never played the game before, saying that it "worth a listen if you love fantasy music".

No.	Title	Length
1.	"Dragon Age: Origins"	2:49
2.	"I Am The One (High Fantasy Version)"	4:03
3.	"The Chantry's Hubris"	3:16
4.	"Elves at the Mercy Of Man"	1:21
5.	"The Dwarven Nobles"	1:07
6.	"Mages in Their Chantry"	2:01
7.	"The Common Dwarf"	1:24
8.	"The Dalish"	1:18
9.	"Human Nobility"	1:21
10.	"Ruins Of Ostagar"	1:18
11.	"Enter The Korcari Wilds"	1:06
12.	"Darkspawn in the Wilds"	1:13
13.	"Join The Grey Wardens"	1:53
14.	"The Betrayal"	3:01
15.	"The Party Camp"	0:44
16.	"Battle The Darkspawn Hordes"	1:05
17.	"The Endless Wave Of Hurlocks"	1:06
18.	"The Dalish Elves Encampment"	1:18
19.	"Urn Of Sacred Ashes"	1:01
20.	"Haven!"	1:07
21.	"Battle for the Urn"	1:06
22.	"Attack On Denerim"	1:06
23.	"The Dungeons Of Landsmeet"	1:12
24.	"Dungeons And Dungeons"	1:13
25.	"Howe"	1:08
26.	"The Battle Of Lothering Village"	2:18
27.	"Ferelden at War"	2:57
28.	"Lelianna's Song [sic]"	2:33
29.	"King Edrin [sic]"	2:33
30.	"The Deep Roads"	1:20
31.	"Battle The Blight"	1:05
32.	"To Kill An Ogre"	3:09
33.	"Challenge An Arch Demon [sic] –"	3:12
34.	"The Coronation"	1:03
35.	"I Am The One (Dark Fantasy Version)"	4:10
Total length:		1:02:33

=== Dragon Age: Origins Collector's Edition Soundtrack Album ===
Dragon Age: Origins Collector's Edition Soundtrack Album

Soundtrack album by Inon Zur and Aubrey Ashburn
- Released: November 3, 2009
- Genre: Video game soundtrack
- Length: 36:18
- Label: Electronic Arts

A press release issued by Electronic Arts issued on September 24, 2009 indicated that selected tracks from the Official Soundtrack would be included in the Dragon Age: Origins Collector's Edition. The album, containing seven tracks not included in the Official Soundtrack, was included in the Collector's Edition of the game which was released on November 3, 2009.

Anderson criticized the lack of content on the soundtrack album which is included with the Deluxe (Collector's) Edition of Origins, alleging that the publisher was being "deceptive by using the words ‘Soundtrack Included’ in bold and hiding ‘sampling of soundtrack’ deep in the text". He stated that "buyers of the Deluxe versions get 18 songs included for the extra $15 they paid. These represent not just a ‘sampling’, but more like a ‘best of’ list of tracks", suggesting that it is "shameless profiteering" and that the publisher essentially sold anyone who owns the a copy of the special edition soundtrack album "the same music twice".

No.	Title	Length
1.	"Dragon Age: Origins"	2:49
2.	"Ruins Of Ostagar"	1:18
3.	"Elves at the Mercy Of Man"	1:21
4.	"The Dwarven Nobles"	1:07
5.	"The Circle Tower"	1:07
6.	"Mages in Their Chantry"	2:01
7.	"Human Nobility"	1:21
8.	"Rise of the Darkspawn"	5:06
9.	"Tavern Brawl"	1:15
10.	"The Grey Warden Legacy"	0:43
11.	"The Realm of Orzammar –"	1:18
12.	"The Urn Of Sacred Ashes"	1:01
13.	"Lelianna's Song [sic]"	2:33
14.	"The Deep Roads"	1:20
15.	"The Nature of the Beast"	1:30
16.	"Ferelden at War"	2:57
17.	"I Am The One (High Fantasy Version)"	4:03
18.	"I Am The One – DJ Killa Jewel Remix"	3:21
Total length:		36:18

=== Dragon Age: Origins – Leliana's Song (Original Video Game Score) ===
Dragon Age: Origins Leliana's Song DLC Album

Soundtrack album by Inon Zur and Aubrey Ashburn
- Released: October 25, 2010
- Genre: Video game soundtrack
- Length: 12:22
- Label: Electronic Arts

The official album soundtrack for the Dragon Age: Origins downloadable content pack, Leliana's Song, was released on October 25, 2010.

No.	Title	Length
1.	"Leliana's Song"	0:59
2.	"Day in a Life"	1:26
3.	"Evening and Night"	2:03
4.	"Leliana's Dance"	1:59
5.	"Sorrow"	1:30
6.	"In the Dungeon"	1:33
7.	"Market Place"	1:23
8.	"Street Fight"	1:31
Total length:		12:22
