= Asura (video game) =

- Developers: Debuz Co., Ltd.
- Engine: DGE (Debuz Game Engine)
- Platform: Microsoft Windows
- Release: THA: March 15, 2007 (as ProjectONE); THA: October 1, 2008 (renamed)
- Genre: Fantasy MMORPG
- Mode: Multiplayer

A screenshot from Asura

Former logo

Asura (Thai: อสุรา) or formerly ProjectONE (Thai: โปรเจควัน) is a free, 2D isometric MMORPG developed by Thailand's company Debuz. It is considered the first Thai MMORPG that was developed by Thai developers.

== Characters ==
Every character starts with the "Cadet" job. When characters meet certain requirements, they can complete the first job advancement and become a Fighter, Ranger, or Caster. Further class progression is only allowed within the scope of the first class advancement chosen. There are three class advancements available progressingly throughout the game.

== Statistics ==
- Strength (STR): Determines the amount of physical damage done to enemies.
- Agility (AGI): Time between normal attacks. The lower the number, the less time taken for a player to execute attacks and avoid.
- Dexterity (DEX): Determines the accuracy of physical attacks executed, gun damage and critical rate of spells. Also determines critical damage for physical attacks and some skills.
- Vitality (VIT): A character's resistance to physical attacks.
- Intelligence (INT): Determines the damage done by spells and increases resistance to enemy spells.
- Luck (LUK): Determines accuracy of spells, accuracy of gun and skill attacks, evasion of spells and gun attacks, critical rate of normal attacks, and block rate against physical attacks. It is disputed whether luck affects compound results.
