= CryEngine =

Game engine by Crytek

- Developer: Crytek
- Release: May 2, 2002; 24 years ago
- Stable release: 5.7.1 / May 19, 2022; 4 years ago
- Written in: C++ (Qt), Lua, C#
- Platform: Linux; Microsoft Windows; Nintendo Switch; Nintendo Switch 2; PlayStation 3; PlayStation 4; PlayStation 5; Wii; Wii U; Xbox 360; Xbox One; Xbox Series X/S
- License: Source-available commercial software with royalty model for commercial use
- Website: www.cryengine.com

CryEngine (stylized as CRYENGINE) is a game engine designed by the German game developer Crytek. It has been used in all of their titles with the initial version being used in Far Cry, and continues to be updated to support new consoles and hardware for their games. It has also been used for many third-party games under Crytek's licensing scheme, including Sniper: Ghost Warrior 2 and SNOW. Warhorse Studios uses a modified version of the engine for their medieval RPG Kingdom Come: Deliverance. Ubisoft maintains an in-house, heavily modified version of CryEngine from the original Far Cry called Dunia, which is used in their later iterations of the Far Cry series. The Dunia engine would in turn be further modified and used in games such as The Crew 2.

According to various anonymous reports in April 2015, CryEngine was licensed to Amazon for $50–70 million. Consequently, in February 2016, Amazon released its own reworked and extended version of CryEngine under the name of Amazon Lumberyard. In June 2021, through Amazon Lumberyard, the open-source Open 3D Engine is based on CryEngine.

== Features ==
- Simultaneous WYSIWYG on all platforms in sandbox editor
- "Hot-update" for all platforms in sandbox editor
- Material editor
- Flow graph
- Track View Editor
- Procedural placement tools and cover generation
- Integrated vegetation and terrain cover generation system
- Real time soft particle system and integrated FX editor
- Road and river tools
- Vehicle creator
- Fully flexible time of day system
- Streaming
- Performance Analysis Tools
- Visual Budget System
- Multi-core support
- Sandbox development layers
- Offline rendering
- Resource compiler
- Natural lighting and dynamic soft shadows with penumbra
- Irradiance Volume
- Deferred lighting
- Real time dynamic global illumination
- Eye adaptation and high-dynamic-range (HDR) lighting
- Screen space ambient occlusion
- Color grading
- "Uber Shader" technology
- Blend Layer
- Normal maps and parallax occlusion maps
- Motion blur and depth of field with sprite-based bokeh
- High quality 3D water
- Dynamic volumetric light beams and light shaft effects
- Volumetric, layer and view distance fogging
- Screen Space Directional Occlusion (SSDO)
- Tessellation (computer graphics) and Displacement Mapping
- Screen-space reflections
- Particles motion blur and shadows
- Character animation system
- Character individualisation system
- Parametric skeletal animation
- Procedural motion warping and IK solutions
- Facial animation editor
- Subsurface scattering
- AI editing system
- Dynamic pathfinding
- Layer Navigation Mesh
- Automated navigation mesh generation
- Tactical Point System
- Integrated multi-threaded physics engine
- Deformables and soft body physics
- Interactive and destructible environment
- Rope physics
- In-game sound mixing and profiling
- Data-driven sound system
- Dynamic sounds and interactive music
- Environmental audio
- Key frame-accurate sounds in animations
- Sound moods
- Water volume caustics
- UV mapping editor
- PBR (Physically Based Rendering)

== Versions ==
This diagram illustrates the development history of CryEngine game engine versions.

=== CryEngine 1 ===
CryEngine 1 was first made and used for the first-person shooter video game Far Cry. It was originally developed by Crytek as a technology demo for Nvidia and, when the company saw its potential, it was turned into a game. When video cards with support for 3.0 pixel and vertex shaders were released, Crytek released version 1.2 of the engine which used some of the capabilities for better graphics. Later the company developed CryEngine version 1.3, which added support for HDR lighting. The engine has been licensed to NCsoft for their MMORPG, Aion: The Tower of Eternity. On March 30, 2006, Ubisoft acquired all intellectual property rights to the Far Cry franchise and a perpetual license to use the Far Cry edition of CryEngine, known as the Dunia Engine.

=== CryEngine 2 ===
CryEngine 2 is used in Crytek's game Crysis, and an updated version in Crysis Warhead, a side story of Crysis. It was first licensed out to French company IMAGTP who specializes in architectural and urban-planning communication. The purpose of licensing the engine was to create a program to allow clients to see exactly what a building or other structure would look like before any actual construction was started. As of March 7, 2011, Simpson Studios has licensed CryEngine 2 out to use on a Massively Multiplayer Virtual World (MMVW) that takes place on a terraformed Mars. On May 11, 2007, Crytek announced that they would be using the engine to create a game based on their new intellectual property. It is also confirmed that it would not be a part of Crysis and in fact may not even be a first-person shooter. On September 17, 2007, Ringling College of Art & Design became the first higher education institution in the world to license CryEngine 2 for educational purposes.

=== CryEngine 3 (3.0–3.5) ===
Crytek introduced CryEngine 3 at the 2009 Game Developers Conference, held from March 25 to March 27 and demonstrated it on the Xbox 360 and PlayStation 3 consoles. The new engine was being developed for use on Microsoft Windows, PlayStation 3, Xbox 360, and Wii U. As for the PC platform, the engine is said to support development in DirectX 9, 10, and 11. As of June 1, 2009, it was announced that Crysis 2 would be developed by Crytek on their brand-new engine. CryEngine 3 was released on October 14, 2009.

Family tree illustrating the history of CryEngine versions

On March 1, 2010, a new tech demo of the engine was released for the i3D 2010 symposium, which demonstrates 'Cascaded Light Propagation Volumes for Real Time Indirect Illumination'. On June 11, 2011, the Australian Defence Force revealed that Navy personnel would train on a virtual landing helicopter dock ship made using the CryEngine 3 software. As of July 1, 2011, the Mod SDK version of CryEngine 3 specifically to create custom maps, mods and content for Crysis 2 is available on Crytek's website. Crytek also released a free-to-use version of the CryEngine for non-commercial game development. It was released as of August 17, 2011 under the name CRYENGINE® Free SDK.

Crytek announced on September 9, 2011, that they would be using CryEngine 3 to bring the original Crysis to consoles. It was released for Xbox Live and PlayStation Network on October 4, 2011.

=== CryEngine (3.6–4) ===
On August 21, 2013, Crytek rebranded CryEngine (starting from version 3.6.0) to simply "CryEngine", and announced that their next CryEngine would not be advertised with a version number. The reason for this decision was the claim that this new engine bears almost no similarity to previous CryEngine versions. However, the development kits available to licensees still use version numbers. The new CryEngine version adds support for Linux and consoles such as the PlayStation 4, Xbox One, and Wii U. Subsequent appearances at events have also featured the use of CryEngine on virtual reality systems, at GDC 2015 Crytek brought a demonstration 'Back To Dinosaur Island' to the event to showcase such.

=== CryEngine V ===
On March 22, 2016, Crytek announced a new version of CryEngine, called CryEngine V. Additionally, a new licensing model was introduced with a "pay what you want" model for usage and access to the source code.

On September 21, 2017, CryEngine 5.4 was released, adding the Vulkan API renderer as a beta, substance integration, and other features including new C# templates, asset system updates, and new anti-aliasing techniques. In December 2018, Crytek announced plans to integrate new cryptocurrency CryCash for purchases on the CryEngine Marketplace in Q2 2018.

On March 20, 2018, Crytek changed the licensing from "pay what you want" to a 5% revenue-sharing model.

In February 2022, Crytek announced to transform the CryEngine Marketplace into a free asset database.

In April 2022, version 5.7 was released with few new features as the multiple features originally intended to be in 5.7 were scrapped and moved to the next iteration of CryEngine. Version 5.7 included Scaleform 4 support. The developers have stated that this will be the last version of CryEngine V and confirmed they are working on a new iteration of CryEngine. The previous versions prior to 5.7 were deprecated and can not be downloaded.

== Development ==
The CryEngine software development kit (SDK), originally called Sandbox Editor, is the current version of the level editor used to create levels for CryEngine by Crytek. Tools are also provided within the software to facilitate scripting, animation, and object creation. It has been included with various Crytek games (including, but not limited to, Crysis and Far Cry), and is used extensively for modding purposes. The editing style is that of the sandbox concept, with the emphasis on large terrains and a free style of mission programming. The editor can also construct indoor settings.

As opposed to editors like UnrealEd (Used in Unreal Engine 1, and Unreal Engine 2), which use a "subtractive" editing style that takes away areas from a filled world space, the Sandbox has an "additive" style (like Quake II). Objects are added to an overall empty space. The Sandbox's concentration on potentially huge (in theory, hundreds of square kilometers) terrain, means that it uses an algorithmic form of painting textures and objects onto the landscape. This uses various parameters to define the distribution of textures or types of vegetation. This is intended to save time and make the editing of such large terrains feasible while maintaining the overall "real world" sandbox-free roaming style. This is different from some editing styles that often use "fake backdrops" to give the illusion of large terrains.

In a fashion somewhat comparable to the 3D Renderer Blender, which can be used for game design, the Sandbox editor has the ability, with a single key press, for the editor to jump straight into the current design (WYSIWYP, "What You See Is What You Play" Feature). This is facilitated without loading the game as the game engine is already running within the editor. The "player" view is shown within the 3D portion of the Editor. The Editor also supports all the CryEngine features such as vehicles and physics, scripting, advanced lighting (including real time, moving shadows), Polybump technology, shaders, 3D audio, character inverse kinematics and animation blending, dynamic music, Real Time Soft Particle System and Integrated FX Editor, Deferred Lighting, Normal Maps & Parallax Occlusion Maps, and Advanced Modular AI System.
