= Total PC Gaming =

British magazine

- Issue 1, November 2007
- Editor: Russell Barnes
- Categories: Video game magazines
- Frequency: 13 per year
- First issue: 8 November 2007
- Final issue: 19 March 2010
- Company: Imagine Publishing
- Country: United Kingdom
- Language: English
- Website: totalpcgaming.com (archived)
- ISSN: 1755-7623
- OCLC: 751038653

Total PC Gaming was a monthly magazine published by Imagine Publishing, launched in 2007 it ran until March 2010. The magazine featured videogame industry news, game reviews, hardware reviews, and sections dedicated to fans of retro gaming and Massively multiplayer online games.

== Staff ==
The staff included editor Russell Barnes, who had been at the helm since issue 2, as well as Games Editor Ben Biggs, who wrote a blog on the magazine's website, Sam Bandah, who ran the Letters page and designer Andy Salter. Stuart Campbell regularly freelanced for TPCG and wrote the monthly "Why I hate PC gamers" column for issues 3–12. Freelancer David Crookes produced a monthly two-page interview with many big names and some old school PC content was also taken from past issues of Retro Gamer. Freelancer James Pikover produced monthly hardware reviews, as well as the 2008 holiday gift guide special.

== Review scores ==
Total PC Gaming scored games reviews out of ten, and only two have achieved a perfect score, Fallout 3 and Grand Theft Auto IV. The lowest score was 2, which is jointly held by The Dark Legions and Soldier of Fortune: Payback.

== Format change ==
When the title was launched, one of the main selling points was that there were no extras attached to the magazine, thus keeping the price (£3.99) lower than the competitors, PC Zone and PC Gamer, who both retailed at £5.99 and were sold in a sealed plastic bag that included a DVD that contained extra content. However, with the release of issue 11, Total PC Gaming had changed to match this format, and had raised the price to £5.49.

== The end ==
On 20 March 2010 a letter was sent out to the magazine's subscribers stating that issue 31 will be the final issue. No reason for the closure was provided. Imagine Publishing director Damian Butt told MCV: "Imagine Publishing can confirm that following a period of review it has decided to close Total PC Gaming magazine with immediate effect. All staff have moved onto other magazines within the company. The website www.TotalPCGaming.com will continue to run as part of the NowGamerNetwork. Issue 31 will be the last to be published. "The support from our advertisers and readers has been fantastic and it's always a shame to close a magazine, especially one that is still profitable, but following the widespread delisting of PC games magazines from many magazine-selling outlets, we felt that the team deserved to be working on projects with greater future potential. "We are currently deciding whether to continue to run a regular digital edition of the magazine on our popular global iPhone/iPad platform."
