= Crysis =

Video game series

- Genre: First-person shooter
- Developers: Crytek; Crytek UK; Crytek Budapest
- Publishers: Electronic Arts (2007–2013); Crytek (2020–present)
- Platforms: Microsoft Windows, PlayStation 3, Xbox 360, PlayStation 4, Xbox One, Nintendo Switch
- First release: Crysis; November 13, 2007
- Latest release: Crysis Remastered Trilogy; October 15, 2021

Crysis is a first-person shooter video game series created by Crytek. The series revolves around a group of military protagonists with "nanosuits", technologically advanced suits of armor that give them enhanced physical strength, speed, defense, and cloaking abilities. The protagonists face off against hostile North Korean soldiers, heavily armed mercenaries, and a race of technologically advanced aliens known as the Ceph, who arrived on Earth millions of years ago and have recently been awakened. The series consists of three main installments, a standalone spinoff of the first game with a separate multiplayer title, and a compilation. A fourth game, under the working title of Crysis 4, was announced by Crytek on January 26, 2022 which has since been put on hold.

== Gameplay ==
Characters in Crysis use nanosuits, advanced powered exoskeletons developed by the U.S. military that grants them special abilities through dedicated "modes", as well as the ability to switch between them at will. Nanosuit's "armor mode" enhances the suit's ability to withstand bullet and shrapnel impacts, "strength mode" greatly enhances the wearer's physical strength, to the point of being able to punch cars through the air; and "speed mode" allows the wearer to run and act extremely fast. Lastly, "cloak mode" activates the suit's optical cloaking device that makes the wearer near-invisible.

The first two games, Crysis and Crysis Warhead, take place in 2020 on the fictional Lingshan Islands, off the Philippines. The protagonists of both games both belong to the fictitious "Raptor Team", a United States Army Delta Force unit that is sent to the island to investigate aggressive behavior by North Korea. The player uses various weapons, including traditional projectile weapons like handguns, submachine guns, assault rifles, and sniper rifles (all of which can be modified with scopes and attachments in real-time), as well as explosives and the nanosuit's natural abilities. Multiplayer gameplay modes introduce fictional futuristic weapons based on the ice technology introduced by the alien antagonists who are later found to reside on the island. In single-player, Raptor Team faces off against both the North Korean military and these alien foes.

Crysis 2, the sequel to the original game, takes place in 2023 in New York City. The protagonist is a new character, a U.S. Marine named Alcatraz. The nanosuit in the game (dubbed "Nanosuit 2") is a streamlined version of the original, without separate "strength" and "speed" modes, rather performing context-sensitive acts of enhanced strength or agility, but retaining the separate "armor" and "cloak" modes.

== Games ==
Release timeline
2007	Crysis
2008	Crysis Warhead
2009
2010
2011	Crysis 2
2012
2013	Crysis 3
2014
2015
2016
2017
2018
2019
2020	Crysis Remastered
2021	Crysis 1, 2 & 3 Remastered Trilogy

=== Crysis ===
After Helena Rosenthal sends a distress signal saying the North Koreans are invading the seemingly unimportant island on which her team is working, the US government dispatches Raptor Team, a group of nanosuit-clad soldiers. After arriving on the island, however, Raptor Team's ranks are thinned by mysterious flying creatures, eventually leaving only Nomad, Psycho, and Prophet, who is subsequently kidnapped by the organisms later called the Ceph. Nomad rescues Helena but is eventually trapped in the alien ship after it unleashes an "ice sphere" on the island, freezing a great deal of the island. Nomad escapes the island with Helena and an oddly-behaving Prophet, and returns to the US carrier fleet, where he finds Psycho. Prophet returns to the island, which is subsequently nuked in the attempt to kill the aliens. However, they only grow stronger from the energy. The aliens launch a massive attack on the carrier fleet, successfully destroying it. Nomad, Psycho, and Helena escape and receive a distress signal from the still-alive Prophet, and decide to return to the island.

=== Crysis Warhead ===
During Psycho's own mission, he was sent to retrieve a captured alien from Colonel Lee and the Koreans. After numerous setbacks and the assistance of his friend O'Neill, Psycho successfully defeats Lee, obtains the alien, and brings it back to the carrier fleet. At this point, the story continues in the original title.

=== Crysis 2 ===
A sequel set 3 years after the first game, Crysis 2 takes place in New York City in 2023, which is infected by an unknown virus. The player controls Alcatraz, a U.S. Marine who is found almost dead by Prophet, and given the upgraded Nanosuit 2 before Prophet commits suicide. He is tasked by Prophet to rescue a scientist named Nathan Gould. At first, Alcatraz has to face Crynet's CELL agents, a mercenary force who is hired by the U.S. Department of Defense to police the chaotic Manhattan, still thinking that Alcatraz is Prophet who is infected by the virus. After discovering Ceph capsules and Catalyst, the Ceph take over as the main antagonists for the rest of the game. Alcatraz and Gould team up with Tara Strickland, an undercover CIA lieutenant, and Jacob Hargreave, the original creator of the nanosuit. Alcatraz eventually enters the Ceph core spire and wipes out all the Ceph in New York. Now facing death again, he meets a memory pattern of Prophet, whose DNA is merged into Alcatraz's. The game closes with Alcatraz being contacted by Karl Rasch, a nanosuit scientist, and vowing to continue the war against the Ceph.

=== Crysis 3 ===
As with its predecessor, Crysis 3 again takes place in New York. Set in 2047, the game sees Prophet return to the now nanodome-encased New York City, on a mission of revenge against CELL, having uncovered the truth behind their motives for building the quarantined nanodomes.

With Crysis 3 being the end of the Crysis trilogy, Crytek teased that the series would have a "radical future". Yerli confirmed that the next installment would not be called Crysis 4, as he considered such a title "misleading". On June 12, 2012, it was revealed that Crytek would focus only on free-to-play titles following the release of Crysis 3.

=== Crysis Remastered ===
A remastered version of the original Crysis was announced on April 16, 2020, and is the first game in the series to be self-published by Crytek. The Nintendo Switch version was released first, on July 23, 2020. The PlayStation 4, Xbox One, and PC versions were initially supposed to launch on the same date, but were delayed to September 18, 2020.

On June 1, 2021 Crytek announced that, following Crysis Remastered, both Crysis 2 and Crysis 3 were similarly updated and will be released as part of Crysis Remastered Trilogy. The bundle launched on October 15, 2021, on Nintendo Switch, PlayStation 4, Xbox One and PC. Each game is also available for purchase individually.

=== Crysis 4 ===
In January 2022, Crytek announced the 4th installment of the franchise on their social network platforms. On February 12, 2025, it was announced that the game has been on hold since Q3 2024.

== Novels ==
=== Crysis: Legion ===
Peter Watts authored a novelization of Crysis 2, Crysis: Legion, which was released in March 2011. The story expands on the idea that the Ceph are not the alien's actual fighting force, but rather carekeepers akin to gardeners.

=== Crysis: Escalation ===
A tie-in novel, Crysis: Escalation, by Gavin Smith is meant to bridge the events of Crysis 2 and Crysis 3.

The novel covers Alcatraz and his ultimate fate after being assimilated with Prophet. After briefly taking control of his body and using it to visit his relatives for the last time, Alcatraz is persuaded by Prophet to give up his body for him which Alcatraz reluctantly agrees.

== Other media ==
=== Board game ===
A turn-based strategy board game based on the Crysis mythos, subtitled Analogue Edition, was being developed by Frame6. A Kickstarter campaign was held, but eventually cancelled following a decision over the funding and marketing.

=== Comics ===
Crysis is a 6-issue series intended to bridge the gap between the storylines of Crysis and Crysis 2. The story focuses on the adventures of Prophet, Nomad, Psycho, and Helena Rosenthal after they return to Lingshan and explains their fates, and reveals much of Prophet's backstory. The comics were released as a single graphic novel on January 31, 2012.

== Reception ==
Aggregate review scores
Game	Metacritic
Crysis	(PC) 91/100 (PS3) 81/100 (X360) 81/100
Crysis Warhead	(PC) 84/100
Crysis 2	(PC) 86/100 (PS3) 85/100 (X360) 84/100
Crysis 3	(PC) 76/100 (PS3) 77/100 (X360) 76/100

Crysis was awarded a 98% in the PC Gamer U.S. Holiday 2007 issue, making it one of the highest rated games in PC Gamer, tying with Half-Life 2 and Sid Meier's Alpha Centauri. The UK edition of the magazine awarded the game 92%, describing the game as "A spectacular and beautiful sci-fi epic." GameSpot awarded Crysis a score of 9.5 out of 10, describing it as "easily one of the greatest shooters ever made." GameSpy gave it a 4.5 out of 5 stating that the suit powers were fun but also criticizing the multiplayer portion of the game for not having a team deathmatch. X-Play gave it a 3 out of 5 on its "Holiday Buyer's Guide" special episode, praising the graphics and physics, but criticized the steep hardware requirements as well as stating that the game is overhyped with average gameplay. GamePro honored Crysis with a score of 4.75 out of 5, saying it was "a great step forward for PC gaming", but criticized the steep hardware requirements. IGN awarded it a 9.4 out of 10, hailing it as "one of the more entertaining ballistic showdowns in quite some time."

Commonly asked of nearly any electronic around the time of its release, even those that could not in any conceivable way run the program, was the phrase "But can it run Crysis?", referring to its very high system requirements. The phrase has continued in modern usage, as a snowclone, with any other high-end (or ironically low-end) game title replacing Crysis.

Crysis Warhead, developed by Crytek Budapest, received largely positive reviews. Most reviewers praised the improvements over the original Crysis in areas like AI and gameplay pacing, citing the original game's criticism that battles were few and far between. The new protagonist, Psycho, was also received better than the original's less developed Nomad. The revamped multiplayer mode, Crysis Wars, was also praised for adding a team deathmatch mode, the lack of which most reviewers criticized in the original game. Criticism of the game by reviewers includes the short story mode and a lack of new features over the original game. Some continued to cite the game's high system requirements as unacceptable even a year after the original game, which has the same requirements. Indeed, some reviewers did not see any significant performance improvement with Warhead compared with Crysis, stating that only high-end GPUs could handle the game comfortably at decent frame rates.
