= List of video games developed by Rare =

Rare is a British video game developer founded by Tim and Chris Stamper after the now-defunct Ultimate Play the Game. Since its inception, the company has produced various titles in a wide variety of genres and on numerous gaming systems, mostly from Nintendo and Microsoft. The company is best known for its platform games, which include the Donkey Kong Country series and the Banjo-Kazooie series, and for its Nintendo 64 first-person shooters GoldenEye 007 and Perfect Dark. This list includes games produced by Rare after its formation. It does not include games developed or published by Ultimate Play the Game.

== Games ==
Year of release	Title	System	Publisher	Genre	Notes.	Ref.
1986	VS. Slalom	Nintendo VS. System	Nintendo	Sports		
1987	Slalom	Nintendo Entertainment System	Nintendo	Sports		
1987	Wizards & Warriors	Nintendo Entertainment System	Acclaim Entertainment	Platform		
1988	R.C. Pro-Am	Nintendo Entertainment System	Nintendo	Racing		
1988	Jeopardy!	Nintendo Entertainment System	GameTek	Game show		
1988	Wheel of Fortune	Nintendo Entertainment System	GameTek	Game show		
1988	Anticipation	Nintendo Entertainment System	Nintendo	Game show		
1989	Sesame Street: 123	Nintendo Entertainment System	Hi Tech Expressions	Edutainment		
1989	WWF WrestleMania	Nintendo Entertainment System	Acclaim Entertainment	Fighting		
1989	John Elway's Quarterback	Nintendo Entertainment System	Tradewest	Sports		
1989	Marble Madness	Nintendo Entertainment System	Milton Bradley	Platform/Racing	(port)	
1989	World Games	Nintendo Entertainment System	Milton Bradley	Sports	(port)	
1989	Taboo: The Sixth Sense	Nintendo Entertainment System	Tradewest	Non-game		
1989	California Games	Nintendo Entertainment System	Milton Bradley	Sports	(port)	
1989	Cobra Triangle	Nintendo Entertainment System	Nintendo	Action		
1989	Jordan vs. Bird: One on One	Nintendo Entertainment System	Milton Bradley	Sports	(port)	
1989	Hollywood Squares	Nintendo Entertainment System	GameTek	Game show		
1989	Sesame Street: ABC	Nintendo Entertainment System	Hi Tech Expressions	Edutainment		
1989	Who Framed Roger Rabbit	Nintendo Entertainment System	LJN	Adventure		
1989	Jeopardy! Junior Edition	Nintendo Entertainment System	GameTek	Game show		
1989	Wheel of Fortune: Junior Edition	Nintendo Entertainment System	GameTek	Game show		
1989	Ironsword: Wizards & Warriors II	Nintendo Entertainment System	Acclaim Entertainment	Platform		
1989	Silent Service	Nintendo Entertainment System	Ultra Games	Simulation	(port)	
1990	Wizards & Warriors X: The Fortress of Fear	Game Boy	Acclaim Entertainment	Platform		
1990	Wheel of Fortune: Family Edition	Nintendo Entertainment System	GameTek	Game show		
1990	Double Dare	Nintendo Entertainment System	GameTek	Game show	(port)	
1990	Pinbot	Nintendo Entertainment System	Nintendo	Pinball		
1990	Ivan "Ironman" Stewart's Super Off Road	Nintendo Entertainment System	Tradewest	Racing	(port)	
1990	Jeopardy! 25th Anniversary Edition	Nintendo Entertainment System	GameTek	Game show		
1990	Cabal	Nintendo Entertainment System	Milton Bradley	Action	(port)	
1990	Captain Skyhawk	Nintendo Entertainment System	Milton Bradley	Shooter		
1990	The Amazing Spider-Man	Game Boy	LJN (United States); Nintendo (Europe)	Beat 'em up		
1990	Snake Rattle 'n' Roll	Nintendo Entertainment System	Nintendo	Action		
1990	Narc	Nintendo Entertainment System	Acclaim Entertainment	Shooter	(port)	
1990	Time Lord	Nintendo Entertainment System	Milton Bradley	Action		
1990	Solar Jetman: Hunt for the Golden Warpship	Nintendo Entertainment System	Tradewest	Action		
1990	A Nightmare on Elm Street	Nintendo Entertainment System	LJN	Platform		
1990	Super Glove Ball	Nintendo Entertainment System	Mattel	Action		
1990	Arch Rivals: A Basket Brawl!	Nintendo Entertainment System	Acclaim Entertainment	Sports	(port)	
1990	WWF WrestleMania Challenge	Nintendo Entertainment System	LJN	Fighting		
1990	Digger T. Rock: The Legend of the Lost City	Nintendo Entertainment System	Milton Bradley	Platform		
1991	WWF Superstars	Game Boy	LJN	Fighting		
1991	Beetlejuice	Nintendo Entertainment System	LJN	Platform		
1991	Sneaky Snakes	Game Boy	Tradewest	Action		
1991	Battletoads	Nintendo Entertainment System	Tradewest	Beat 'em up		
1991	High Speed	Nintendo Entertainment System	Tradewest	Pinball		
1991	Pirates!	Nintendo Entertainment System	Ultra Games	Adventure	(port)	
1991	Super R.C. Pro-Am	Game Boy	Nintendo	Racing		
1991	Sesame Street: ABC/123	Nintendo Entertainment System	Hi Tech Expressions	Edutainment		
1991	Battletoads	Game Boy	Tradewest	Beat 'em up		
1992	Beetlejuice	Game Boy	LJN	Platform		
1992	Wizards & Warriors III: Kuros: Visions of Power	Nintendo Entertainment System	Acclaim Entertainment	Platform		
1992	Danny Sullivan's Indy Heat	Nintendo Entertainment System	Tradewest	Racing	(port)	
1992	R.C. Pro-Am II	Nintendo Entertainment System	Tradewest	Racing		
1992	Championship Pro-Am	Mega Drive	Tradewest	Racing		
1992	Battletoads	Amiga	Mindscape	Beat 'em up		
1993	Battletoads	Mega Drive	Tradewest / Sega	Beat 'em up	Mainly developed by Arc System Works	
1993	Battletoads & Double Dragon	Nintendo Entertainment System	Tradewest	Beat 'em up		
1993	Battletoads in Battlemaniacs	Super Nintendo Entertainment System	Tradewest	Beat 'em up		
1993	Battletoads in Ragnarok's World	Game Boy	Tradewest	Beat 'em up		
1993	Battletoads / Double Dragon	Mega Drive	Tradewest	Beat 'em up		
1993	Battletoads & Double Dragon	Super Nintendo Entertainment System	Tradewest	Beat 'em up		
1993	Battletoads / Double Dragon	Game Boy	Tradewest	Beat 'em up		
1993	Battletoads	Game Gear	Tradewest / Sega	Beat 'em up	Mainly developed by Arc System Works	
1993	X The Ball	Arcade	Capcom	Sports		
1993	Snake Rattle 'n' Roll	Mega Drive	Sega	Action		
1994	Battletoads Arcade	Arcade	Electronic Arts	Beat 'em up		
1994	Battletoads	Amiga CD32	Mindscape	Beat 'em up		
1994	Battletoads in Battlemaniacs	Master System	Virgin / Tectoy	Beat 'em up		
1994	Donkey Kong Country	Super Nintendo Entertainment System	Nintendo	Platform		
1994	Killer Instinct	Arcade	Midway	Fighting		
1995	Monster Max	Game Boy	Titus Software	Platform		
1995	Donkey Kong Land	Game Boy	Nintendo	Platform		
1995	Killer Instinct	Super Nintendo Entertainment System	Nintendo	Platform		
1995	Donkey Kong Country 2: Diddy's Kong Quest	Super Nintendo Entertainment System	Nintendo	Platform		
1995	Killer Instinct	Game Boy	Nintendo	Fighting		
1996	Killer Instinct 2	Arcade	Midway	Fighting		
1996	Ken Griffey Jr.'s Winning Run	Super Nintendo Entertainment System	Nintendo	Sports		
1996	Donkey Kong Land 2	Game Boy	Nintendo	Platform		
1996	Donkey Kong Country 3: Dixie Kong's Double Trouble!	Super Nintendo Entertainment System	Nintendo	Platform		
1996	Killer Instinct Gold	Nintendo 64	Nintendo	Fighting		
1997	Blast Corps	Nintendo 64	Nintendo	Action		
1997	GoldenEye 007	Nintendo 64	Nintendo	First-person shooter		
1997	Donkey Kong Land III	Game Boy	Nintendo	Platform		
1997	Diddy Kong Racing	Nintendo 64	Rare	Racing		
1998	Banjo-Kazooie	Nintendo 64	Nintendo	Platform		
1999	Conker's Pocket Tales	Game Boy Color	Rare	Platform		
1999	Jet Force Gemini	Nintendo 64	Rare	Third-person shooter		
1999	Donkey Kong 64	Nintendo 64	Nintendo	Platform		
1999	Mickey's Racing Adventure	Game Boy Color	Nintendo	Racing		
2000	Donkey Kong GB: Dinky Kong & Dixie Kong	Game Boy Color	Nintendo	Platform		
2000	Perfect Dark	Nintendo 64	Rare	First-person shooter		
2000	Perfect Dark	Game Boy Color	Rare	Action		
2000	Donkey Kong Country	Game Boy Color	Nintendo	Platform		
2000	Mickey's Speedway USA	Nintendo 64	Nintendo	Racing		
2000	Banjo-Tooie	Nintendo 64	Nintendo	Platform		
2001	Conker's Bad Fur Day	Nintendo 64	Rare / THQ	Platform		
2001	Mickey's Speedway USA	Game Boy Color	Nintendo	Racing		
2002	Star Fox Adventures	GameCube	Nintendo	Action-adventure		
2003	Donkey Kong Country	Game Boy Advance	Nintendo	Platform		
2003	Banjo-Kazooie: Grunty's Revenge	Game Boy Advance	THQ	Platform		
2003	Grabbed by the Ghoulies	Xbox	Microsoft Game Studios	Beat 'em up		
2004	Sabre Wulf	Game Boy Advance	THQ	Platform		
2004	Donkey Kong Country 2	Game Boy Advance	Nintendo	Platform		
2005	Banjo-Pilot	Game Boy Advance	THQ	Racing		
2005	It's Mr Pants	Game Boy Advance	THQ	Puzzle		
2005	It's Mr Pants	Mobile phone	In-Fusio	Puzzle		
2005	Conker: Live & Reloaded	Xbox	Microsoft Game Studios	Platform		
2005	Donkey Kong Country 3	Game Boy Advance	Nintendo	Platform		
2005	Kameo: Elements of Power	Xbox 360	Microsoft Game Studios	Action-adventure		
2005	Perfect Dark Zero	Xbox 360	Microsoft Game Studios	First-person shooter		
2006	Viva Piñata	Windows	Microsoft Game Studios	Life simulation		
2006	Viva Piñata	Xbox 360	Microsoft Game Studios	Life simulation		
2007	Diddy Kong Racing DS	Nintendo DS	Nintendo	Racing		
2007	Jetpac Refuelled	Xbox 360 (Xbox Live Arcade)	Microsoft Game Studios	Shooter		
2007	Viva Piñata: Party Animals	Xbox 360	Microsoft Game Studios	Party	Mainly developed by Krome Studios	
2008	Viva Piñata: Trouble in Paradise	Xbox 360	Microsoft Game Studios	Life simulation		
2008	Viva Piñata: Pocket Paradise	Nintendo DS	THQ	Life simulation		
2008	Banjo-Kazooie: Nuts & Bolts	Xbox 360	Microsoft Game Studios	Vehicle construction		
2010	Kinect Sports	Xbox 360	Microsoft Game Studios	Sports		
2011	Kinect Sports: Season Two	Xbox 360	Microsoft Studios	Sports		
2013	Killer Instinct	Windows	Microsoft Studios	Fighting	(uncredited)	
2013	Killer Instinct	Xbox One	Microsoft Studios	Fighting	(uncredited)	
2014	Kinect Sports Rivals	Xbox One	Microsoft Studios	Sports		
2015	Rare Replay	Xbox One	Microsoft Studios	Compilation		
2018	Sea of Thieves	Windows	Microsoft Studios	Adventure		
2018	Sea of Thieves	Xbox One	Microsoft Studios	Adventure		
2018	Sea of Thieves	Xbox Series X/S	Xbox Game Studios	Adventure	Xbox Series X/S in 2020 and PlayStation 5 in 2024	
2018	Sea of Thieves	PlayStation 5	Xbox Game Studios	Adventure	Xbox Series X/S in 2020 and PlayStation 5 in 2024	
2020	Battletoads	Windows	Xbox Game Studios	Beat 'em up	Mainly developed by Dlala Studios	
2020	Battletoads	Xbox One	Xbox Game Studios	Beat 'em up	Mainly developed by Dlala Studios	
2025	Rare Collection 1	Evercade	Blaze Entertainment	Compilation		

== Cancelled games ==
Title	System	Genre	Year of development
Jetpac	Commodore 64	Shooter	1984
Knight Lore	Commodore 64	Action-adventure, maze	1984
Bubbler	Commodore 64	Action	1985
Alien 8	Commodore 64	Action-adventure, maze	1985
Mire Mare	ZX Spectrum	Action-adventure	1986
Pentagram	Amstrad CPC	Action-adventure, maze	1986
BC Games	Nintendo Entertainment System	Sports	Unknown
Exterminator	Nintendo Entertainment System	N/A	1990
Screwballs Superleague	Nintendo Entertainment System	Action, fighting	1990
Snakes in Space	Nintendo Entertainment System	Platform	1990
Wrestlerage	Super Nintendo Entertainment System	Fighting	1991
Jonny Blastoff and the Kremling Armada	Windows, Mac OS	Point-and-click	1992
Project Dream / Dream: Land of Giants	Super Nintendo Entertainment System, Nintendo 64	Adventure, RPG	1995–1996
Killer Instinct 2	Super Nintendo Entertainment System	Fighting	1996
Twelve Tales: Conker 64	Nintendo 64	Platform	1996-1998
Jet Force Gemini	Game Boy Color	Shooter	1999
Velvet Dark	Nintendo 64, GameCube	Shooter	2000
Quest	GameCube, Xbox	MMO	2000–2002
Donkey Kong Racing / Sabreman Stampede	GameCube, Xbox, Xbox 360	Racing	2001–2005
Conker's Other Bad Day	GameCube, Xbox	Platform	2002
Arc Angel	Xbox	Racing	2003
Battletoads	Game Boy Advance	Beat' em up	2004
Banjo-X	Xbox	Platform	2005
Ordinary Joe	Xbox 360	Survival horror	2005
Conker: Gettin' Medieval	Xbox 360	Shooter	2006–2010
Savannah	Xbox 360	Simulation	2006
The Fast and the Furriest	Xbox 360	Party	2006
Urchin	Xbox 360	Adventure, horror	2006
Black Widow	Xbox 360	Action	Unknown
Kameo 2	Xbox 360	Adventure	Unknown
Sundown	Xbox 360	Survival horror	Unknown
Avatar Sports	Xbox 360	Sports	2007–2008
Crackdown 2	Xbox 360	Shooter	2007
Cascade	Xbox 360	MMO	2007
Tailwind	Xbox 360	Action	2007
Banjo-Kazoomie / Banjo-Karting / The Fast and the Furriest	Xbox 360	Racing	2008
Butcher	Xbox 360	N/A	2008
Project Bean / GoldenEye 007	Xbox 360 (Xbox Live Arcade)	Shooter	2008
Kinect Trainer	Xbox 360	Sports	2009
SoulCatcher	Xbox 360	Action, adventure	2010
Everwild	Windows, Xbox Series X/S	Adventure	2014–2025
