= Battletoads (disambiguation) =

Battletoads is a media franchise.

It may also refer to:

- Battletoads (1991 video game)
- Battletoads (2020 video game)
- Battletoads (Game Boy video game)
- Battletoads Arcade
