= List of arcade video games: X =

This is a list of arcade video games organized alphabetically by name. It does not include PC or console games unless they were also released in video arcades. See Lists of video games for related lists.

Title	Alternate Title(s)	Year	Manufacturer	Genre(s)	Max. Players	PCB Model
X Se Dae Quiz	—	1995	Dream Island			
X The Ball	—	1991	Rare		1	
X-Files	—	1999	dgPIX Entertainment			
X-Men	—	1992	Konami	Beat 'em up	6	
X-Men: Children of the Atom	—	1994	Capcom	Fighting	2	CPS2
X-Men vs. Street Fighter	—	1996	Capcom	Fighting	2	CPS2
X-Multiply	—	1989	Irem	Scrolling shooter	2	
X-tom 3D	—	1999	Game Vision	Combat flight simulator	1	
X2222	—	2000	Oriental Soft			
Xain'd Sleena	Solar Warrior ^{US}	1986	Technōs Japan	Platformer, Shooter	2	
Xenon	—	1988	The Bitmap Brothers	Vertically scrolling shooter	1	Arcadia
Xenophobe	—	1987	Bally-Midway	Run 'n Gun	3	
Xevious	—	1982	Namco	Scrolling shooter	2	
Xevious 3D/G	—	1995	Namco	Scrolling shooter	2	
Xexex	Orius ^{US}	1991	Konami	Scrolling shooter	2	
XII Stag	—	2003	Taito	Scrolling shooter	2	
Xiyou Shi E Chuan Qunmoluanwu	—	2004	IGS			
Xtrial Racing	—	2002	Konami	Racing	1	
XX Mission	—	1986	UPL	Scrolling shooter	2	
Xybots	—	1987	Atari Games	Shooter	2	
Xyonix	—	1989	Philko	Puzzle	2	
