= Battletoads (Game Boy video game) =

- North American cover art
- Developer: Rare
- Publishers: NA: Tradewest; EU: Nintendo; JP: Masaya
- Programmer: Paul Machacek
- Artist: Kevin Bayliss
- Composer: David Wise
- Series: Battletoads
- Platform: Game Boy
- Release: NA: November 1991; EU: 1992; JP: January 7, 1994
- Genre: Action Beat 'em up
- Mode: Single-player

Battletoads is a 1991 action game originally released by Rare in 1991 exclusively for the Nintendo Game Boy. Despite having the same title as the original Battletoads game, Battletoads for Game Boy is a completely different game with unique levels. It was never ported to any other systems. A more faithful port of the NES game for the Game Boy was released later, in 1993 as Battletoads in Ragnarok's World.

== Gameplay ==
Gameplay screenshot

The game is single-player only. The player controls Zitz, and is given three lives and three continues to complete the game, after which they must start over. The gameplay is a mix of side-scrolling fighting and various vehicle races, consisting of eight stages. As with the original Battletoads, the Game Boy game is known to be difficult to beat, requiring fast reflexes, memorization of obstacles, and patience. This is also one of the two Battletoads games in which the player does not have to confront the Dark Queen herself, although she still taunts the player in cutscenes before the levels in a similar fashion to other games in the series.

The game sees Zitz travel to the planet Armageddon to rescue fellow Battletoads Rash and Pimple, who have been captured by the Dark Queen's lackey Robo-Manus, who serves as the final boss. Zitz's mission begins on Armagedda's surface, where Psyko-Pigs and rat-piloted UFOs roam about to destroy intruders. When fighting them, Zitz is capable of unleashing powerful finishing combos. In the second stage, Zitz must pilot a speeder bike through a deadly obstacle course. The speeder bike is armed with a laser cannon, allowing Zitz to shoot down incoming enemies and also battle Scuzz the Rat who appears piloting the Rat Rocket at the end. In the third stage in the dark caverns of Armagedda, Zitz must use the vines to swing across large gaps. Stage four has Zitz hitting the waves on a jet-ski, dodging logs and rafting rats. Stage five poses a foot-race in a zig-zagging path in which Zitz must escape from a constantly rolling brain-like boulder while minding the sudden turns and not stopping. Stage six has Zitz rappelling down a chasm, dodging birds, spikes, and Saturn Toadtraps. In stage seven, Zitz straps on a jet pack and flies high to the tip-top while avoiding barricades, laser beams, and enemies during the flight under a 99-second time limit. In the final stage, Zitz must keep balance and avoid obstacles as he runs around circular platforms in which there's a pseudo 3D effect of running around the platforms before the final battle with Robo-Manus.

== Release ==
The game was released in North America in November 1991, published by Tradewest, and in Europe during 1992, published by Nintendo and actually predating the European release of the original NES game. Both releases feature the same cover art as the NES release of Battletoads. The game was released in Japan on January 7, 1994, published by Masaya long after its western releases. The Japanese version portrays the same cover art as the Japanese version of Battletoads in Battlemaniacs, which was released the same day.

== Reception ==
Reception

Review scores
Publication	Score
ACE	745/1000
Electronic Gaming Monthly	8/10, 8/10, 8/10, 7/10
Famitsu	5/10, 4/10, 5/10, 4/10
N-Force	86%
Total!	90%

GameRankings, a game review aggregator, assigned Battletoads for the Game Boy an averaged score of 77.67% based on three reviews.
