= Pro Quarterback =

1992 video game

- Super NES cover art
- Developer: Leland Interactive Media
- Publisher: Tradewest
- Producer: Michael Abbott
- Programmers: James Michael Hann; Bruce Moore
- Artist: Kevin Lydy
- Composer: Eric Hammond
- Platforms: Super NES, Sega Genesis
- Release: Super NES: NA: December 1992; Genesis: NA: 1992
- Genre: Sports (American football)
- Modes: Single-player, multiplayer

Pro Quarterback is a 1992 American football video game developed by Leland Interactive Media and published by Tradewest for the Super NES and the Sega Genesis. A port for the Atari Lynx was announced but never released.

== Gameplay ==
There are 27 unlicensed football teams in this game. Mode 7 was featured in the Super NES version due to its ability to enhance the movement of the football.

The colors of the team's uniforms are almost the same as the uniforms used in the 1992 NFL season, however. Six different surfaces can be used along with quarters ranging from two minutes to a full 15 minutes. The referee call delay of game penalties in the game when the play clock runs out, the only penalty in the game. There is no other penalties in the game, making offsides and roughing the quarterback into workable strategies. Players are notoriously slow in this game; it is possible for six defensive linemen to catch up with the quarterback and sack him before he is ready to make a forward pass. The announcer will call "interception", when a defensive player catches the ball or "fumble", if the ball is loose during a play. A humorous animation is played after an incomplete pass, interception, or fumble during play selection on the scoreboard.

Players are in complete control of both the offense and the defense. However, the number of defensive plays is considerably lower than the number of offensive plays; encouraging players to specialize in offense. The view is always shifted to down the field so that receivers can easily be tracked while the player is controlling the offensive line.

== Reception ==
Reception

Aggregate score
Aggregator	Score
GameRankings	55.38% (SNES)

Review score
Publication	Score
Mega	25%

Reviewing the Genesis version, Mega said that it had "terrible graphics, no life-span, no playability."
