= Double Dare (video game) =

1988 video game

- NES cover art
- Developer: Rare (NES)
- Publisher: GameTek
- Programmer: Steve Patrick (NES)
- Composer: David Wise (NES)
- Platforms: MS-DOS, NES, Commodore 64
- Release: 1988: C64, MS-DOS; 1990: NES
- Genre: Game show
- Modes: Single-player, multiplayer

Double Dare is a video game published by GameTek and based on the Nickelodeon game show Double Dare. The game was released by for MS-DOS and Commodore 64 in 1988. A port to the Nintendo Entertainment System by Rare was published in 1990.

== Gameplay ==
Double Dare can be played by one or two players; single players compete against the computer. Before the game starts, players enter their team names and select from four male and four female avatar. Whichever avatar the player picks, the teammate will be of the opposite gender. The game can also be set for one of three levels of difficulty with higher levels offering less time to answer questions and a more difficult computer opponent.

The game plays exactly like its television counterpart, with two rounds of 10-question trivia rounds and a third round featuring an obstacle course. The rules and scoring from the game show all apply. Toss-up challenges determine which team gets initial control of the trivia round. To complete a toss-up, each player determines the precise speed and angle of whatever object they are throwing to hit a target. Physical challenges are played the same way. Each player uses the up or down arrows on the controller to choose answers for trivia questions. The player with the most money at the end of round two proceeds to the obstacle course.

In order to move through an obstacle, the player needs to repeatedly alternate between pressing either the left and right or up and down arrows on the controller's D-pad. In order to grab the flag, the player needs to position the on-screen contestant in just the right spot and then press the A button to jump and retrieve. The obstacles are all based on real obstacles from the show (with one exception, a triangular jungle gym) and are randomized before a game.

Virtual prizes for beating the obstacle course include a BMX bicycle, television set, an NES console, and several other gifts, ending with an exotic vacation received for completing the last obstacle.

== Reception ==
David & Robin Minnick reviewed Double Dare and Hollywood Squares for Compute!'s Gazette and said "Any fan of the TV games will enjoy these 64 versions. And even if you're not a fan, we think you'll get a kick out of these games anyway."
