= Fun 'n Games =

1993 video game

- Sega Genesis front cover box art
- Developer: Leland Interactive Media
- Publishers: Genesis: NA: Tradewest; EU: Sony Electronic Publishing; SNES: NA/EU: Tradewest
- Producer: Michael Abbott
- Programmers: Don Goddard (SNES); David Schwartz
- Artists: Francisco Garcia; Michael Platteter
- Composer: Chip Burwell
- Platforms: Mega Drive/Genesis; Super NES
- Release: Genesis/Mega Drive: NA: December 1993; EU: October 1994; Super NES: NA: August 1994; EU: May 25, 1994
- Genres: Edutainment; Maze; Shooter game
- Mode: Single-player

Fun 'n Games (Sometimes spelled Fun 'N' Games) is a compilation video game developed by Leland Interactive Media and released for the Mega Drive/Genesis and Super NES platforms in 1993 and 1994 respectively. In 1995, an updated, redeveloped version of the game was released on the 3DO Interactive Multiplayer and MS-DOS by Williams Entertainment Inc. The North American Super NES version of the game is considered to be one of the more rare games released for the console.

== Gameplay ==
Fun 'n Games is a compilation of puzzles, arcade games, a music composer and a paint program in one video game. The game is arranged into four different types of activities, or categories: Paint, Games, Music and Style. There is virtually no difference in gameplay between the Super NES and Mega Drive/Genesis versions. However, the North American Genesis version has an extra game in the Games section that's not in the European Mega Drive version.

Parts of the game is controlled in a computer mouse-like fashion. The Super NES version is compatible with the Super NES Mouse in addition to the standard controller. Similarly, the Mega Drive/Genesis version is compatible with the Mega Mouse.

=== Paint ===
In the Paint activity the player can draw on a canvas, but also in a coloring book if desired. Different artistic tools, for example a pencil, pre-made backgrounds, paint bucket, patterns, stamps and different colors are supported. Previously created figures from the activities Stylin' Stuff and Mix and Match can be imported to the drawing.

=== Games ===
The Games activity consists of three different minigames: Mouse Maze, Spaze Lazer and Whack a Clown.

Mouse Maze is a Pac-Man style game where the player takes control of a mouse in a maze. The mouse must collect all the cheese in the maze to be able to advance to the next level, which is another maze. Mouse traps that appear randomly in the maze makes the mouse freeze for a couple of seconds if the mouse collides with any of them. In the meantime, cats wander in the maze and try to eat the mouse. The player loses a life if the mouse is eaten by a cat, and if all three lives are lost, the game is over. To protect itself, the mouse can collect bones scattered in the maze to transform into a dog for a period of time, and the dog is able to eat the cats.

In Spaze Lazer, a spaceship is controlled by the player in first-person view and needs to defend itself by aiming and firing the spaceship guns at enemy spaceships. A radar on the screen helps the player locate the enemy spaceships. When all of the enemy spaceships are destroyed, the player faces a boss monster. When the boss is defeated, the player advances to the next level where the spaceship must be defended against even tougher enemies. The player's spaceship starts with 99 in energy, and the energy decreases when the spaceship is hit by enemy fire. If the energy reaches 0, the game is over.

The Whack a Clown game is a variant of Whac-A-Mole, and is exclusive to the Sega Genesis version of the game. There are nine holes from which both clowns and seals pop up randomly, only to disappear later. A hammer is controlled by the player which is used to hit the clowns in the head. Every time a clown is hit by the hammer, the player is awarded with one point. If a seal is hit with the hammer, the player loses a life. When the game timer runs out or all lives are lost, the game ends.

Originally, a fourth minigame was planned for at least the Sega Genesis version of the game. It was called Basketball Jones, and the goal was to practice free-throws in Basketball. Nevertheless, it was removed from the game during development.

=== Music ===
The Music activity allows the player to compose music by placing notes on an on-screen stave. By pressing the play button, the tune composed by the player can be listened to. An in-game piano can as well be used to place notes on the stave. 15 different types of instruments and 15 different types of sound effects are supported in addition to different paces and half-notes. Moreover, pre-made songs can be opened, listened to and modified.

=== Style ===
The Style activity consists itself of two different activities: Stylin' Stuff and Mix and Match. In Stylin' Stuff the player selects the looks of a woman paperdoll. Hair, hat, shirt, pants, shoes and purse are all selectable by clicking on buttons. The objective of the Mix and Match activity is similar to Stylin' Stuff, but now the player instead selects the top, middle and bottom thirds of a creature.

== Reception ==
Reception

Review scores
Publication	Score
Electronic Gaming Monthly	6.2 out of 10 (Genesis)
Nintendo Power	3.05 out of 5 (SNES)
Mean Machines Sega	28 out of 100 (Genesis)

The Super NES version of Fun 'n Games was reviewed in 1994 in both Nintendo Power and GamePro. It was praised for its variety, creativity, music and graphics, but the activities were considered simple and too restricting for more advanced and/or older players. Regarding the arcade-style games the reviewers found them too shallow and not challenging enough to entertain players for any longer amount of time. Also, the Nintendo Power reviewer argued that the SNES Mouse was a better alternative for playing the game than the Super NES controller. Both reviewers argued that the player would have more fun playing Mario Paint. Reviewing the Genesis version, Mike Weigand of Electronic Gaming Monthly called it "a good non-action game almost anyone can enjoy".
