= John Elway's Quarterback =

1987 video game

- Developers: Leland Corporation; Rare (NES)
- Publishers: Virgin Games; Tradewest (NES)
- Composers: Sam Powell (arcade); David Wise (NES)
- Platforms: Amstrad CPC, Arcade, Commodore 64, NES, Apple II, Apple IIGS, IBM PC, ZX Spectrum
- Release: 1987
- Genre: Sports
- Mode: Single-player

John Elway's Quarterback, also known as John Elway's Quarterback Challenge and John Elway's Team Quarterback, is a 1987 American football video game.

== Summary ==
NES gameplay

Tradewest developed Quarterback as an arcade video game. In 1988 John Elway agreed to endorse it, and the company renamed the game John Elway's Quarterback. Tradewest released a version for the Nintendo Entertainment System and Melbourne House for various home computers such as Commodore 64, ZX Spectrum, IBM PC compatibles, Apple II, and Apple IIGS. The arcade game is an upright cabinet that supports two players.

The controls are different for both the left and right sides (offense and defense). There is a spring-loaded joystick which allows the player to angle and release according to where they were throwing (for the quarterback) or kicking. When possession changes, players switch sides of the console, and play continues. In both cases, players can select from a playbook of formations and plays.

On offense, the player has the option of selecting the "normal play," which is nearly impossible for the defense to stop if performed correctly. To select the "normal play," the player must highlight the play in the play selection menu and wait for the play selection menu timer to expire. In the "normal play," the quarterback must pass the ball quickly to avoid being sacked, as the offensive line collapses unusually quickly in this formation. Once the ball is released, the wide receivers will run toward the ball. If the ball is caught, the receiver will have the ability to run at extremely high speeds. The receiver will then be nearly impossible for the defense to catch and tackle.
