= Project Dream =

Cancelled role-playing video game

- Provisional title screen
- Developer: Rare
- Publisher: Nintendo
- Designer: Gregg Mayles
- Artists: Steve Mayles; Ed Bryan
- Composers: David Wise; Grant Kirkhope
- Platforms: Super NES, Nintendo 64
- Release: Released as Banjo-Kazooie in 1998.
- Genres: Role-playing, platform
- Mode: Single-player

Project Dream was the codename of a cancelled role-playing video game (RPG), Dream: Land of Giants, which served as the basis for the 1998 game Banjo-Kazooie. Developed by Rare, it was aimed for release on the Super Nintendo Entertainment System (SNES), and later the Nintendo 64 (N64). The plot followed a young boy, Edson, who caused trouble with pirates. The SNES version of Dream used an isometric perspective and had a fairy tale theme. After transitioning to the N64, the project became a more complex 3D RPG that had a greater emphasis on the pirate theme. Eventually, Dream was scaled back to a linear platform game in the vein of Donkey Kong Country (1994) that starred Banjo the bear, who became the protagonist of Banjo-Kazooie.

Dream was developed by Rare's Donkey Kong Country 2: Diddy's Kong Quest (1995) team over 16 months. It was inspired by Japanese RPGs and LucasArts adventure games, and the name Dream emphasized its fantastical themes. Dream was not completed because Rare believed it was too ambitious and different from their previous games. Inspired by an early version of another Rare game in development, Conker's Bad Fur Day (2001), and Nintendo's Super Mario 64, the team reworked Dream to be a platformer. The Dream concepts were re-integrated into Banjo-Kazooie, which was released to critical and commercial success.

== Premise ==
A screenshot of gameplay from the Nintendo 64 version of Edson in a village

During most of its development period, Project Dream was a role-playing video game (RPG) that focused on a boy named Edson and his pets Dinger the dog and Billy the parrot. In its story, a band of pirates led by Captain Blackeye searched for "floaty", a substance that would allow their ships to fly. Edson got into trouble with the pirates and set off on a journey with his girlfriend to escape them. The Super Nintendo Entertainment System (SNES) version used an isometric perspective and had a fairy tale theme. Edson used a wooden sword to fight trolls and Dinger performed actions to assist him, such as going ahead and digging holes to find items. Occasionally, a dinosaur would appear and attempt to crush Edson by stepping on him; falling leaves and the virtual camera system shaking warned the player when it was approaching.

When development transitioned to the Nintendo 64 (N64), Dream became a larger RPG rendered in 3D computer graphics. The pirate theme became more dominant than the fairy tale one. As development progressed on the N64, the game went through radical changes. Edson was replaced twice, first by a rabbit and later by Banjo the bear, who became the main character of Banjo-Kazooie. The final version was a linear platformer in the vein of Rare's Donkey Kong Country games, and bore little resemblance to the earlier versions.

== Development ==
Gameplay screenshot from the Super Nintendo Entertainment System version of Edson attacking a troll, observed by Dinger

After Nintendo released the SNES, Rare used the profits they made from Nintendo Entertainment System games to invest in Silicon Graphics workstations. Rare used this high-end technology to develop Donkey Kong Country (1994), which was a critical and commercial success, becoming the second best-selling SNES game behind Super Mario World (1990). After finishing Donkey Kong Country, Rare staff decided to apply the technology to a new game that was not a platformer. They settled on developing an RPG, as they were all fans of the genre. The codename Dream was chosen because they wanted their RPG to have a fantastical, magical feel. Dream used Donkey Kong Country's graphics technology to an advanced level. It was inspired by Japanese RPGs and LucasArts adventure games; the team wanted to combine those games to create one with a "Rare flavour". Dream was developed by Rare's Donkey Kong Country 2: Diddy's Kong Quest (1995) team and was announced in 1995.

As development progressed, the team felt it was too large for a SNES cartridge and the introduction of the N64 rendered the Silicon Graphics technology obsolete. Thus Rare made the decision to switch development to the N64. After this transition, the fantasy theme was gradually dropped. According to Rare's Gregg Mayles, the team did not want the game to be too childish. They brought the pirate theme from Diddy’s Kong Quest, as Rare staff felt they "could have a lot of fun with it" and believed it would have a broad appeal due to Mayles' love of the Golden Age of Piracy. While some aspects were kept in the transition to the N64, Dream became a much larger RPG. During this transition, Rare began to feel Edson was losing his relevance and began looking for a new protagonist. He was replaced with the rabbit and eventually Banjo. The decision to use Banjo, who originated as a side character, was made by the Rare cofounder Tim Stamper. Banjo was designed to have human qualities and was given a backpack to put items in.

Over time, the team began to believe Dream was too ambitious and different from their previous games. They also could not find how it would be enjoyable to play. Composer Grant Kirkhope said Rare struggled to get it running at a good frame rate. Meanwhile, another Rare team was working on what became the platform game Conker's Bad Fur Day (2001). Impressed, the Dream team retooled their game into a Donkey Kong Country-esque platformer, which they felt more comfortable with. At this point, few elements from earlier incarnations remained.

In total, Dream was in development for sixteen months and development restarted four times. The soundtrack was primarily composed by Kirkhope; David Wise also contributed but left partway through development to compose Diddy Kong Racing (1997). Kirkhope wrote 107 tracks with "strong" themes and some were reused in later games.

== Legacy ==
When Dream staff saw Nintendo's Super Mario 64 (1996), they realized it was going to set the standard for 3D games and ruin their project. They scrapped their work on Dream and began developing a new game inspired by Super Mario 64. Banjo was kept because the team liked the character. The fantasy theme was restored, and within another 16 months, Rare had finished Banjo-Kazooie. The game was released in 1998 and was a commercial success, topping the United Kingdom all-format charts—a feat a Rare game would not accomplish again until its 30th anniversary game Rare Replay in 2015—and attracted critical acclaim. The antagonist of Dream, Captain Blackeye, has cameo appearances in Banjo-Kazooie and its sequel Banjo-Tooie (2000); in Tooie, he gripes about how a bear stole his glory, referencing the development of Dream. Numerous assets from Dream were also reused in Banjo-Kazooie. Dream's pirate theme was eventually recycled in Rare's 2018 game Sea of Thieves. GamesRadar+ expressed relief that Dream became Banjo-Kazooie, believing it would have been a "snoozefest" if it had not been retooled.

For many years, little was known about Dream. Only a few images were released, although Kirkhope revealed some information about it on his blog. In May 2015, Tim Stamper confirmed fan speculation that he possessed a prototype. The following December, Rare released "Rare Revealed: A Rare Look at Dream", a short documentary about the making of Dream, on their YouTube channel to promote the release of Rare Replay. The video features developer commentary from Rare staff and previously unreleased gameplay footage. A prototype of the SNES version was anonymously distributed online in September 2026.
