= Captain Skyhawk =

1990 video game

- North American NES box art
- Developer: Rare
- Publisher: Nintendo: NA: Milton Bradley (NES)
- Composer: David Wise
- Platforms: Nintendo Entertainment System, arcade
- Release: NES: NA: June 1990; EU: May 24, 1994
- Genre: Scrolling shooter
- Mode: Single-player
- Arcade system: PlayChoice-10

Title screen

Captain Skyhawk is a scrolling shooter video game developed by Rare for the Nintendo Entertainment System. The game was released in North America by Milton Bradley in June 1990 and in Europe by Nintendo in May 1994. It was also released for arcades by Nintendo in 1990. It was based on a concept from Milton Bradley, with Rare being contracted to develop the game.

== Gameplay ==
The game is reminiscent of Sega's Zaxxon. The game features top-down scrolling overhead isometric graphics, including simulated 3D terrain. The player pilots a plane, code-named the F-14VTS (a fictional version of the F-14) and must avoid the mountainous terrain while annihilating aliens.

There are nine missions in the game. The first seven have three objectives each while missions eight and nine have two objectives and one objective, respectively. Each level has multiple routes, some of which allow the player to bypass large gatherings of hostiles. The objectives vary across missions and include destroying an enemy base, dropping supplies, fighting aerial battles, picking up a scientist, and docking with a space station.

=== Weapons ===
The player can fire four types of weapons: Cannon, Phoenix Air Intercept Missiles, Maverick air-to-ground missiles, and Hawk bombs. The cannon is the only weapon with an unlimited supply. The rest of the weapons must be purchased between missions after docking with the space station. The purchases are made with credits obtained through the levels by destroying all aliens that are in a group. Purchasing additional cannons allows the player to fire much more rapidly.

=== Level design ===
Each main level in Captain Skyhawk is an isometric plane. After the boss of the stage is destroyed or the packages are delivered the player moves on to a rear-facing 2D screen where he must destroy the enemy planes to gain credits to buy weapons in the space station on the end of the levels. The last space station is replaced with the alien mother-ship.

== Story ==
The player takes a role of a fighter pilot working to repel an alien invasion. Aliens have invaded Earth, and have built four land bases. These bases are designed to drain Earth's energy and feed it to their mother space station. If the space station is allowed to obtain enough energy, it will destroy the Earth with a massive laser blast. The player must destroy the enemy bases, then go after the space station itself. Scientists, during the course of the game, are working on a top-secret Neutron Cannon. During several missions, the player must make supply drops to the scientists working underground. Sometimes, the aliens will have a scientist captive. Then the player must defeat the alien base and take the scientist to safety.

== Retrospective commentary ==
The game received positive retrospective reviews from online critics.
