= Battletoads Arcade =

1994 arcade game

- Arcade flyer
- Developer: Rare
- Publisher: Electronic Arts
- Producer: Chris Stamper; Tim Stamper
- Designers: Gregg Mayles; Kevin Bayliss & Chris Sutherland; Pete Cox & Chris Stamper (hardware)
- Programmer: Chris Sutherland
- Artists: Steve Mayles; Kevin Bayliss
- Composer: Dave Wise
- Series: Battletoads
- Platform: Arcade
- Release: 1994
- Genre: Beat 'em up
- Modes: Single-player, multiplayer

Battletoads Arcade, also known as Super Battletoads or just Battletoads, is a 1994 arcade game developed by Rare and published by Electronic Arts (EA). As the Battletoads, players brawl aliens and mutant rodents through six levels to save the universe from the Dark Queen. Each Battletoad has its own attack, and similar to previous Battletoads games, players can knock enemies towards the screen, breaking the fourth wall.

Rare took greater liberties with violence and gore in Battletoads Arcade compared to previous games since it was not destined for a console release. Battletoads Arcade was Rare's first game to use the 3D graphics technology later implemented in the 1994 games Donkey Kong Country and Killer Instinct. Although Battletoads Arcade playtested well and appeared financially viable, EA hesitated to release it.

Battletoads Arcade was unsuccessful and Rare canceled its in-production ports, including a finished Game Boy version. It did not receive a console release until 2015, Rare included an emulated version in the Xbox One compilation Rare Replay. Rare Replay reviewers were surprised by Battletoads Arcade's quality and considered it one of the compilation's highlights. Battletoads Arcade was the last Battletoads game for 26 years, until the reboot game Battletoads (2020).

== Gameplay ==
Zitz decapitates three rat foes.

Battletoads Arcade is a coin-operated, scrolling beat 'em up arcade game. Up to three players, as the Battletoads (Rash, Pimple, and Zitz), punch and kick oncoming enemies through six levels to save their alternate universe from the Dark Queen. Arcade was the first Battletoads game to feature three-player cooperative multiplayer. Players control their characters with eight-directional joysticks and two buttons (attack and jump). Characters can run if the player pushes the joystick twice in the same direction. The Toads vary in fighting style: Rash is nimble, Pimple is burly, and Zitz is a balance of the two. As customary for the series, the Toads can knock enemies off-screen such that they appear to fly towards the players, breaking the fourth wall. The Toads can also eat flies to regenerate health. Each Toad has its own signature exaggerated power and attack, in which their limbs turn into objects such as axes and drills. Enemies include aliens, mutant rodents, and snowmen.

Each level has a unique theme, such as a "Christmas grotto", and a boss fight finale. Some bosses, such as General Slaughter, return from previous games. Some levels differ in presentation and gameplay. Some levels are Double Dragon-style 2.5D brawlers, while others are strictly two-dimensional. In one level, the Toads wear jetpacks and descend a tunnel, and in the final level, the Toads shoot enemies from a vehicle. Players can also destroy a spaceship in a Street Fighter II-style bonus stage. Battletoads Arcade is displayed in standard definition raster graphics in horizontal orientation with either mono or stereo sound within an upright arcade cabinet.

== Development and release ==
The game was developed by Rare, published by Electronic Arts, and released in 1994 as the fifth game in the Battletoads series. Rare founders Tim and Chris Stamper created the series in response to interest in the Teenage Mutant Ninja Turtles. The Battletoads series—especially the 1991 original Battletoads for the Nintendo Entertainment System (NES)—became popular in its own right and led to a series of sequels. Since this sequel was in development for arcades rather than consoles, Rare took greater liberties in its depiction of violence, unlike their obligations in the rest of the series. While the original NES Battletoads censored blood, Battletoads Arcade showed gore and decapitation (although this could be turned off in the game's DIP switches). The Dark Queen was also depicted in a more lascivious style. Rare had begun to experiment with 3D graphics around this time, and went with PowerAnimator (later Autodesk Maya). Battletoads Arcade was the first Rare game to use PowerAnimator, well before it was implemented in Killer Instinct and Donkey Kong Country.

Despite being finished, the game remained unreleased "for ages", according to Rare's George Andreas, who had worked on the game. The game had playtested and sold well in their market tests, but its release did not meet expectations. Rare had completed and tested a handheld Game Boy port of Battletoads Arcade but it was cancelled following the arcade game's poor sales. A Super NES port was also planned and canceled, likely due to the arcade game's mediocre reception. Rare's Brendan Gunn had worked on the port and said that the team had nearly finished the first level before the project was scrapped. He figured that the decision may have been linked to mediocre sales but was not sure. Super Battletoads, as the arcade game was also known, was the planned title for the two ports.

Battletoads Arcade received its first console release when it was emulated for the Xbox One as part of the 2015 Rare Replay compilation of 30 games from Rare's 30-year history. In the Rare Replay version, additional features include a setting for unlimited continues, the ability to "rewind" time (and replay a section), and the opportunity to save game progress at any time.

== Reception ==
Battletoads Arcade "bombed badly" with mediocre sales. Christopher Michael Baker (AllGame) wrote that the arcade release rode the success of its console game predecessor when the order is usually reversed. He found the two games similar in brawling style with simple controls, but felt that the arcade game had better graphics. He noted how both included the effect of knocking enemies towards the players off-screen. Baker felt that the signature attacks were interesting and added replay value. Overall, he was somewhat let down by the arcade game, having expected something more, but rated Battletoads Arcade four of five stars. AllGame compared Battletoads Arcade to Turtles in Time and The Simpsons Arcade Game.

Retro Gamer retrospectively wrote that Battletoads Arcade was a "relatively obscure" game, but the best in the series. They described it as "unmistakable" Rare: "bombastic, colorful, and well-designed". Retro Gamer put it on par with the arcade games of Konami and Sega and praised its humour, combat, and character. They added that Arcade was a swan song for the series, with numerous references to moments and levels from previous games. For example, the first stage atop the Dark Queen's ship was similar to the opening of Battletoads/Double Dragon and the jetpack level was reminiscent of the "Wookie Hole" level in the original Battletoads. The magazine added that the level of gore set it apart from previous series entries and that the game had a mediocre reception in arcades. They called its console cancellation "a tragedy".

Twenty years after its initial release, several Rare Replay reviewers highlighted Battletoads Arcade within the compilation. Chris Carter (Destructoid) wrote that the game was an unexpected favourite in his Rare Replay review. Philip Kollar (Polygon) was also "surprised" by the game, which he found incredibly fun. Kollar ranked the game near the middle of the Rare Replay collection. Timothy Seppala (Engadget) was grateful to be introduced to Battletoads Arcade on Rare Replay. He considered the game among Rare's "finest moments" and one of two retro titles worth playing. Sam Machkovech (Ars Technica) described the game as one of the rarest in the compilation.

== Legacy ==
The franchise went on hiatus following Battletoads Arcade's poor performance. Its next release would be 26 years later, with the 2020 series reboot. In the mid-2000s, Rare began to plan a possible sequel but ultimately decided that there was no original direction for the game apart from its past and did not want to repeat the failed Teenage Mutant Ninja Turtles reboot. The arcade game's failure also led Rare to set low expectations for future arcade releases. Battletoads Arcade later influenced the cooperative play mode in the 2011 Ratchet & Clank: All 4 One and Kotaku recognized Battletoads Arcade among the 16-bit era beat 'em ups with the best graphics.
