= Battletoads (2020 video game) =

2020 video game

- Developers: Dlala Studios; Rare
- Publisher: Xbox Game Studios
- Director: AJ Grand-Scrutton
- Producers: Gemma Foster; Victoria Webb; Chris Jones
- Designers: AJ Grand-Scrutton; Grant Allen; Miljan Glenny; Daniel Gonzalez
- Programmers: Ben Waring; Chris Rickett; John-Evans Wagenaar; Luke Amer
- Artists: Loukia Kyriakidou; Rory Jobson; Yeonjae Lee; Mike Dietz; Ed Schofield
- Writers: Tom Kauffman; Kelsy Abbott; Wade Randolph
- Composers: David Housden; Paul Housden
- Series: Battletoads
- Engine: Unity
- Platforms: Windows; Xbox One
- Release: August 20, 2020
- Genre: Beat 'em up
- Modes: Single-player, multiplayer

Battletoads is a 2020 beat 'em up game developed by Dlala Studios and Rare and published by Xbox Game Studios. It is a reboot of the Battletoads series, and the first new entry in 26 years following 1994's Battletoads Arcade. The game was released on August 20, 2020, for Windows and Xbox One platforms.

== Gameplay ==
Like the original Battletoads, the game is a side-scrolling beat 'em up. Up to three players can play cooperatively as the Battletoads; Rash, Pimple and Zitz, each with distinct playstyles. The game's graphical style is hand-drawn and has more of a cartoon-styled aesthetic than prior series games.

The game has an obstacle course reminiscent of the original game's notoriously difficult Turbo Tunnel, but instead of the original's side view, the one in the reboot has the camera behind the bikes. The rebooted sequence retains its nostalgic difficulty, with its game over screen providing the player with messages of encouragement, but it also features a range of selectable difficulty settings.

== Plot ==
Trapped in a fantasy simulator bunker for 26 years, the Battletoads awaken to discover they are no longer intergalactic heroes and have fallen into modern-day obscurity. In a bid to reclaim their glory, they set out to once again defeat their old longtime nemesis, the Dark Queen, after Rash deduces her location. But when they confront the queen, they end up teaming up with her to take down an evil alien race called the Topians, who have not only stolen the queen's powers, but also were the ones who trapped the toads in the bunker.

== Development and release ==
The reboot was developed by Dlala Studios with the assistance and supervision of series creator Rare. Dlala Studios previously worked on Overruled, a platform brawler. Prior to the game's announcement at E3 2018, the Battletoads series had been dormant for decades and was last displayed in the 2015 retrospective compilation Rare Replay. Rare's intention was to remake classic Battletoads gameplay without the limitations of 1980s hardware. The game received its first gameplay trailer at the June 2019 E3 and was playable at Microsoft's November X019 trade show. The game was originally anticipated for a 2019 release as an Xbox One exclusive, but was later set for release on August 20, 2020, for Windows and Xbox One.

== Reception ==
In a preview of the game, IGN wrote that the game lacked the difficult platforming for which the original was known, though the game itself remained difficult. GamesRadar praised Dlala's progress on the game at a mid-2019 demo. Two months after its release, Rare reported that the game had reached over a million unique players.

=== Critical response ===
Reception

Aggregate scores
Aggregator	Score
Metacritic	PC: 66/100; XONE: 72/100
OpenCritic	60% recommend

Review scores
Publication	Score
Computer Games Magazine	5/10
Destructoid	7/10
Game Informer	5/10
GameSpot	6/10
Hardcore Gamer	4/5
IGN	8/10
Shacknews	5/10

Battletoads received mixed reviews. Aggregating review website Metacritic gave the PC version 66/100 and the Xbox One version 72/100. Fellow review aggregator OpenCritic assessed that the game received fair approval, being recommended by 60% of critics. Chris Scullion of Pure Xbox gave the game 8 out of 10, praising the animation, dialogue, soundtrack and wide variety in difficulty, but was more critical of repetitive levels, limited moveset and puzzle sections. Joe Juba of Game Informer rated the game 5/10 and described it as "a shallow swamp", criticizing the game for its "aggressively unfunny" writing, poor story and "average" combat as well as stating the game felt unfinished, though being appreciative of its controls and lack of technical issues.
