= Hollywood Squares (video game) =

1988 video game

- Developer: Rare
- Publisher: GameTek
- Platforms: Apple II, MS-DOS, Commodore 64, NES
- Release: NES: NA: September 1989; MS- DOS: NA: 1988; Commodore 64: NA: 1988
- Genre: Quiz
- Modes: Single-player, multiplayer

Hollywood Squares is a quiz game based on the television game show Hollywood Squares. Versions were released for the Nintendo Entertainment System, MS-DOS, Commodore 64, and Apple II. The game is based on the 1986-1989 version hosted by John Davidson. The photo of the set is from the 1985 series pilot (the actual show had no gold stars on the studio floor and more elaborate risers for the cars).

== Gameplay ==
Players have to either agree or disagree with fictitious celebrities to earn squares and make tic-tac-toe. Much like the TV series, winning one of the first two games is worth $500, the third game is worth $1,000 and the second game is always the "Secret Square" game. The winner then goes on to the bonus round, where they have to choose one of five keys and insert it into the proper car among the five offered.

== Reception ==
David & Robin Minnick reviewed Double Dare and Hollywood Squares for Compute!'s Gazette and said "Any fan of the TV games will enjoy these 64 versions. And even if you're not a fan, we think you'll get a kick out of these games anyway."

Jeff Hurlburt for RUN Magazine said "Maybe you won't toss out your trusty Trivial Pursuit cards, but they're sure to get a much needed rest. For information, value and just plan fun, it's three in a row for Hollywood Squares."

Leslie Mizell for the Game Player's Encyclopedia of Nintendo Games said "Hollywood Squares doesn't have the necessary substance to be a videogame that remains enjoyable with repeated playing."

== Later releases ==
In 2010, Ludia released a game based on the 2002-2004 era of the show. The game features the voice of host Tom Bergeron and video clips of celebrities Brad Garrett, Kathy Griffin, Jeffrey Tambor, and Martin Mull as the center square. The game was first released for the PC and Wii, followed by releases for iOS devices. In 2011, a port was released onto PlayStation Network. All versions have multiplayer options, except for the PC version. Much like the 2003–2004 season, each of the three games are worth $1,000.the second game is always the "secret square" round for a bonus $1,000. The winner from the best two out of three games goes to the bonus round where Tom will ask each celebrity a question while the player has to correctly either agree or disagree with their answer in order to remove one of the wrong keys from the pool of nine (the actual bonus round had a contestant choose a celebrity by correctly either agreeing or disagreeing statements about that particular celebrity). Then the player has to pick a key that would open the chest in order to win $20,000 plus a new wardrobe item for their avatar.
