= Dlala Studios =

British video game developer

- Type: Private
- Industry: Video games
- Founded: 22 June 2012; 14 years ago
- Founder: Aj Grand-Scrutton; Craig Thomas
- Headquarters: Witham, Essex, England
- Key people: Aj Grand-Scrutton (CEO); Ben Waring (CTO); Gemma Foster (COO); Mark Ragon (CIO)
- Products: Battletoads; Disney Illusion Island
- Website: dlalastudios.com

Dlala Studios is a British video game developer based in Witham, England. The company was founded in 2012, and is most known for creating games such as Battletoads and Disney Illusion Island.

== History ==
Dlala Studios was founded by Aj Grand-Scrutton and Craig Thomas in June 2012. Both Thomas and Grand Scrutton were colleagues at Jagex, the developer behind RuneScape. The small studio, which operated at Grand-Scrutton's basement at the time, had no budget for their first game and, therefore, decided to develop a game for Windows 8 exclusively because it was a new development scene and they had little competition. The game, which later became Jansky, had a development cycle of nine and a half weeks. The development team met with representatives from Microsoft in July 2012, and subsequently, became part of its incubation program with Lift London, one of Microsoft's internal studios for a year. The studio then worked on Overruled!, a multiplayer arena brawler, with independent game publisher Team17.

Following the release of Overruled!, the studio signed with Creative Artists Agency, which helped Dlala to arrange meetings with publishers for game contracts. The studio was able to acquire one with Chris Nicholls, an executive producer for Disney Interactive, who was interested in working with the studio after seeing the animation style for Overruled!. Disney paid $250,000 for the project's pre-production, and $3.5 million for its completion. To work on the project, the studio expanded to include 14 full-time staff. Several months before the project's estimated launch, it was cancelled in 16 January, after Disney announced that it would withdraw from the video game business. After the deal with Disney collapsed, Dlala had to enact cost-cutting measures and worked on work-for-hire projects, including The Escapists, Lost Words: Beyond the Page, and Sea of Thieves. Several staff, including Thomas, left the studio.

Dlala then collaborated with Rare on a reboot for the Battletoads series. Rare lead designer Paul Collins described it as an "indie-plus" game, as Rare only provided support for polishing the title. While the game attracted 1 million players two months after its initial launch, it received mixed reviews. The team cited their overambition and the game's lack of focus as factors leading to its middling reception, and decided to "downscope" their next title early in its development cycle. The studio then worked with Disney again on Disney Illusion Island, which shared a lot of gameplay concepts with the cancelled game.

== Games ==
Year	Title	Platform(s)	Publisher(s)
2012	Janksy	Windows	Dlala Studios
2015	Overruled!	Linux, macOS, Windows, PlayStation 4, Xbox One	Team17
2020	Battletoads	Windows, Xbox One	Xbox Game Studios
2023	Disney Illusion Island	Nintendo Switch, Windows, PlayStation 5, Xbox Series X/S	Disney Electronic Content
2027	Murals	Windows	Dlala Studios
