= Battletoads =

Video game franchise

- Genres: Beat 'em up, platform game
- Developers: Rare; Dlala Studios (2020)
- Publishers: Masaya (1991–1994); Tradewest (1991–1994); Electronic Arts (Arcade); Xbox Game Studios (2019–present)
- Creator: Tim and Chris Stamper
- Platforms: NES, LCD game, Game Boy, Super NES, Master System, Genesis, Game Gear, CD32, Arcade, Xbox One, Windows, Nintendo Switch
- First release: Battletoads; June 1, 1991
- Latest release: Battletoads; August 20, 2020

Battletoads is a video game franchise by Rare that began with the original beat 'em up game Battletoads in 1991. Starring three anthropomorphic toads named after skin conditions, Rash, Zitz, and Pimple, the series was created to rival the Teenage Mutant Ninja Turtles games series. The original Battletoads game for the NES was renowned for its extreme difficulty, but still received a cult following, spawning sequels for various platforms including a crossover with the Double Dragon series and a modern reboot after a 25-year gap in releases. In each of the games, the objective is to defeat the toads' nemesis the Dark Queen and her army of space mutants.

== Video games ==
=== Series ===
- Battletoads: The Battletoads have to defeat the evil Dark Queen on her planet and rescue their kidnapped partners, Pimple and Princess Angelica. Originally released for the Nintendo Entertainment System (NES) in 1991 by Rare, the game was distributed by Tradewest in Europe and North America, and by Masaya Games in Japan. It was subsequently ported by Arc System Works to the Sega Genesis and Game Gear in 1993, and by Mindscape to the Amiga and Amiga CD32 in 1994.
- Battletoads: An LCD game was released by Tiger Electronics in 1991.
- Battletoads (Game Boy): A spin-off of the original also released in 1991. Despite having the same box art and title as the original NES release, it is an entirely different game from the NES version.
- Battletoads in Battlemaniacs: Released in 1993 for the Super Nintendo Entertainment System (SNES) and developed in 1994 for the Master System (but not released until 1996). In this game, Zitz and the daughter of Psicone Industries' CEO have been captured and it is up to Rash and Pimple to save them from being the Dark Queen. Different from the previous games, in this one each character has its own specific abilities and combos. Pimple is the powerhouse, big and boasting a large range with punches, while Rash is nimble and smaller, fighting using kicking attacks. Aside from cooperative play, a solo player is able to play as Rash by switching to the second controller.
- Battletoads in Ragnarok's World: A stripped down port of the original game for the Game Boy, released in 1993.
- Battletoads/Double Dragon: A crossover with the characters from the Double Dragon series with liberties taken. The Dark Queen and Shadow Boss team up and five heroes (the three toads, Zitz, Rash and Pimple, and the two Lee brothers, Billy and Jimmy) must stop them. For the first time in the series, the game offers players a character selection screen. Released in 1993 for the NES, Genesis, SNES and Game Boy.
- Battletoads Arcade: An arcade game released in 1994, also known as Super Battletoads. The arcade game, unlike the other games, featured voice-overs and several other features that distinguish it from the other games, such as a vastly increased level of violence. It follows the Battletoads in Battlemaniacs updated formula of each character having his own design and specific abilities and combos, but this time featuring the three toads, Zitz, Rash and Pimple, as selectable characters: while Rash is kept as the nimble and smaller character and Pimple as the powerhouse, Zitz is represented as the intermediate and balanced character. Vehicle levels emphasize combat, rather than memorizing and avoiding obstacles.
- Battletoads (2020): An Xbox One and Microsoft Windows game developed by Dlala Studios in collaboration with Rare, it was released on August 20, 2020. It features three-player couch co-op multiplayer and high resolution hand-drawn 4K 2.5D graphics.

The Battletoads appear in a bonus boss encounter in the Xbox One and PC versions of Shovel Knight. Battletoads and Battletoads Arcade are included in Rare Replay, a compilation of 30 Rare games released for the Xbox One in 2015. Rash appears as a playable guest character in the third season of the fighting game Killer Instinct, available on Xbox One and Windows. Rash also appears as an action figure in Grounded.

=== History of production ===
A sequel/remake game was being developed for the Game Boy Advance, but was ultimately canceled. In 2013, Phil Spencer from Microsoft's Xbox team mentioned his fondness for Battletoads while asking the fans what Rare games should be brought back for the Xbox One. In 2014, "Battletoads" was re-trademarked in the United States. Spencer appeared publicly in a Battletoads T-shirt in 2015, just days after Microsoft Studios' Ken Lobb (creator of 2013's Killer Instinct reboot) said they have plans to bring Battletoads and other classic Rare series back "someday".

=== Other ===
Battletoads: The Official Battlebook, the Tradewest-authorized guide to the Battletoads console games, was written by Steve Schwartz and published in 1994 by Prima Publishing. Detailed playing tips, strategies, and secrets were provided for the following games: Battletoads (NES and Genesis), Battletoads in Battlemaniacs (Super NES), and Battletoads/Double Dragon (NES, Genesis, and Super NES).

== Animated special ==
Battletoads
- Title card
- Genre: Comedy
- Created by: Tim and Chris Stamper (original characters)
- Written by: David Wise
- Directed by: Kent Butterworth
- Voices of: Kathleen Barr; Ian James Corlett; Michael Donovan; Andrew Kavadas; Lalainia Lindbjerg; Scott McNeil; Jason Michas; Alvin Sanders
- Theme music composer: Kip Lennon; Ron Hicklin; Susan Boyd; Jon Joyce; Jim Haas
- Opening theme: "Battletoads"
- Composers: Murray McFadden; Michael Watts
- Country of origin: United States
- Original language: English
- No. of episodes: 1

Production
- Executive producers: Andy Heyward; Robby London
- Producer: Kent Butterworth
- Editors: Mark A. McNally; Cindy Horness
- Running time: 22 minutes
- Production companies: DIC Animation City; Tradewest, Inc. Rare

Original release
- Network: Syndicated
- Release: November 1992

Battletoads spun off a half-hour animated television special produced by DIC Animation City in an attempt to capitalize on the popularity of the Teenage Mutant Ninja Turtles (DiC would try this again later on when producing Street Sharks and Extreme Dinosaurs). Intended as the pilot for a full-fledged series, the special was syndicated by Bohbot Entertainment in the United States on the weekend of Thanksgiving 1992 as part of their "Kids' Day Off" package. It was never picked up for a series however, despite comic-style ads in GamePro magazine claiming otherwise.

Buena Vista Home Video released the pilot on VHS in January 1994. It received an official YouTube release on August 5, 2014, on a YouTube channel run by the Canadian company DHX Media (now WildBrain), which currently owns the rights to most of DIC's cartoon library.

The story served as a prequel to the video game franchise. Set in Oxnard, California, it stars three junior high schoolers. The trio is given the ability to transform into anthropomorphic toads with superhuman strength and the ability to change their arms and legs into weapons in techniques called "Smash Hits". They are charged with protecting Professor T. Bird and Princess Angelica from the Dark Queen, who wants to steal Angelica's magical amulet for her plans of universal conquest.

The cartoon was adapted and written by David Wise (not to be confused with the Battletoads video games' composer of the same name). A comic with the backstory of Battletoads, written by Rare employee Guy Millar, was also published in Nintendo Power.

=== Voice cast ===
- Ian James Corlett as Zitz / Morgan Zigler, Basketball player, Psyko Pig
- Jason Michas as Rash / Dave Sharr
- Scott McNeil as Pimple / George Pie, General Slaughter
- Kathleen Barr as The Dark Queen, Giblets, Dave Sharr's girlfriend, junior high students
- Lalainia Lindbjerg as Princess Angelica
- Michael Donovan as Professor T. Bird, Principal, computer geek
- Alvin Sanders as Mr. Thorpin
- Andrew Kavadas as Scraf'n Donuts Man

== Reception ==
In 2010, Game Informer included Battletoads among ten gaming franchises that deserve a revival, and precisely, "a true HD sequel". In 2012, Forbes listed it as one of five video game franchises "that need to come back from the dead", adding that a remake "should retain its side-scroller qualities while adopting the 2.5D style" similar to Mark of the Ninja. The series' return was also demanded by other outlets, including Complex, Maxim and GameRevolution.

On the other hand, the animated version of Battletoads was very badly received. It was included on the lists of five "worst one-shot TV cartoons ever made" by Topless Robot in 2008.

== Prank call ==
Beginning in early 2011, 4chan users organized a mass prank calling to the Gold and Silver pawn shop, home to the popular TV show Pawn Stars. The callers would repeatedly ask the employees if they sold Battletoads. These prank calls led Rick Harrison, star of Pawn Stars and owner of the store, to repeatedly swear and yell at the callers, who recorded and uploaded the prank calls to YouTube. This originated a series of many other similar videos of pranksters dialing random establishments and asking about Battletoads. Battletoads developer Rare has acknowledged the prank via an achievement named "Do You Have Battletoads?" in their 2015 game compilation Rare Replay.

== See also ==
- Extreme Dinosaurs
- Teenage Mutant Ninja Turtles (1987 TV series)
