= Battletoads in Battlemaniacs =

1993 video game

- North American SNES box art
- Developer: Rare (Note: Master System port developed by Syrox Developments.)
- Publishers: SNES: NA: Tradewest; PAL: Nintendo; JP: Masaya; Master System: BRA: Tec Toy
- Programmer: Brendan Gunn (SNES)
- Composers: David Wise (SNES); Matt Furniss (MS)
- Series: Battletoads
- Platforms: Super Nintendo Entertainment System, Master System
- Release: Super NES: NA: June 1993; EU: October 1993; AU: 1993; JP: January 7, 1994; Master System; BR: 1996
- Genres: Beat 'em up, platform
- Modes: Single-player, multiplayer

Battletoads in Battlemaniacs is a beat 'em up platform game developed by Rare for the Super Nintendo Entertainment System. Part of the Battletoads series, the game was released in North America by Tradewest in June 1993, in Europe by Nintendo in October 1993 and in Japan by Masaya on January 7, 1994. It was also ported for the Master System and released exclusively in Brazil. It was released around the same time as Battletoads/Double Dragon, another installment in the series. The game received its first official re-release on the Nintendo Classics service on February 21, 2024, as it was not included in the Rare Replay collection for the Xbox One.

The game follows two Battletoads, Rash and Pimple, on a quest to stop Silas Volkmire and the evil Dark Queen from ruling over the world. Many of its levels are enhanced or remixed versions of levels from the original Battletoads, featuring similar mechanics and gameplay styles. Battletoads in Battlemaniacs received a mostly positive response from critics, with praise for its varied gameplay and music, and criticism for its lack of originality and high difficulty.

== Plot ==
The story begins with the Battletoads visiting the Gyachung-La fortress in northern Tibet. Professor T. Bird has invited them there to witness the Psicone Corporation's first demonstration of their new virtual reality game system, T.R.I.P.S. (Total Reality Integrated Playing System). While showing off the system's artificial world (entitled "The Gamescape"), a pig of the apocalypse leaps out of the screen and kidnaps Michiko Tashoku (daughter of Psicone Corporation's CEO, Yuriko Tashoku). Zitz attempts to rescue her, but gets knocked out by the pig and captured as well. The pig escapes back into the Gamescape and Silas Volkmire appears on the screen, announcing his plans to turn the real world into his own Gamescape, and that Michiko and Zitz are being held captive under the evil Dark Queen. With nothing left to lose, Rash and Pimple enter the Gamescape to rescue their friends and stop Volkmire and the Dark Queen from fulfilling their plans.

Along the way, they fight Rocky, a giant stone pig, and race against Scuzz, a rat that challenges them all throughout the final level. The Battletoads finally reach the Dark Queen in her tower and defeat her, but she manages to escape again. Bird picks up Volkmire on his scanners and finds out that he is trying to escape using a teleporter, so the Battletoads leave the Gamescape and hop into the Battlecopter to chase after him.

Depending on the player's actions during this final gameplay segment, there are two possible endings that may occur. If the player is unable to shoot three missiles at Volkmire's teleporter, he gets away, and the Battletoads feel dejected knowing that Volkmire is free and the Dark Queen wants revenge. If the player successfully shoots three missiles at Volkmire's teleporter, the ship crashes in the Himalayas and is recovered, but Volkmire is nowhere to be found. Similarly to the first ending, it is alluded to that Volkmire and the Dark Queen will want revenge.

== Gameplay ==
Pimple uses the "Battletoad Butt" special move to defeat an enemy. As in previous games, the artistic style of Battletoads in Battlemaniacs is decidedly cartoony, as shown here by the massive, exaggerated ram horns.

Battletoads in Battlemaniacs is an action-platform beat 'em up game that takes place inside the Gamescape, a fictional, virtual world where computer-generated villains created by Silas Volkmire run amok. The player controls either Rash or Pimple, depending on which controller they have plugged in, and have longer health meters than in previous games. Unlike previous entries in the Battletoads series, however, each character has their own combo attacks and special moves. Pimple, for example, can use the "BT Big Hammer" special move at the end of a combo, wherein an exaggerated hammer protrudes from his fists, instantly killing his foes. Rash, on the other hand, can use the classic "Big Boot Block" move from the original Battletoads, where his foot transforms into a massive, spiky boot.

The game is split up into six stages, each with their own special type of gameplay. For example, the first stage, "Khaos Mountains" is a side-scrolling beat 'em up, whereas the fifth stage, "Tracktors" is a racing level that takes place on rails. Though the stages feature unique twists on gameplay styles, all of the stages are actually enhanced versions of their counterparts from the first Battletoads. For instance, stage three, "Speeder Bikes" is very similar to the original game's third stage, which also featured the player racing on speedbikes and dodging obstacles in the same way. In addition, stage four, "Karnath's Revenge" also resembles the original game's sixth stage, wherein the player rides along massive, fast-moving snakes in order to get to the exit.

Battletoads in Battlemaniacs also features a handful of bonus stages in which the player can earn extra lives. These stages appear after the second and fifth stages, respectively, and feature Rash or Pimple on a circular disc as the screen scrolls to the right, allowing the player to collect red and blue colored bowling pins and avoid the black ones. In addition, the game features a handful of boss fights, ranging from a massive stone pig named Rocky, who jumps high in the air and stomps the ground, to the Dark Queen herself, who teleports around her tower and shoots magic missiles at the player.

== Release ==
Battletoads in Battlemaniacs was first released for the SNES in North America in June 1993, in Europe in October 1993, in Australia in 1993 and in Japan on January 7, 1994.

The game was ported in 1994 to the Master System by Syrox Developments and was going to be published in Europe by Virgin Interactive Entertainment with a slated July 1994 launch date. However, the European release was pulled at the last moment for unknown reasons and with the game already having been reviewed by the British video game press. The game was released in a barely finished state by Tec Toy in Brazil in 1996; it is an unpolished build of the game, with some stages not having music and minor glitches, some including a choppy scrolling floor in the bonus stages and invisible obstacles in the turbo tunnel.

The SNES version of the game was re-released on the Nintendo Classics service on February 21, 2024.

== Reception ==
Initial reviews

Aggregate score
| Aggregator | Score |
|---|---|
| GameRankings | 78% (SNES) |

Review scores
| Publication | Score |
|---|---|
| Electronic Gaming Monthly | 8/10, 8/10, 8/10, 9/10 (SNES) |
| Famitsu | 7/10, 6/10, 6/10, 6/10 (SFC) |
| GameFan | 97% (SNES) (Note: In GameFan's review, two critics scored Battletoads in Battlemaniacs 99%, one 94%, and another a 96%.) |
| GamePro | 4.375 (SNES) (Note: GamePro gave Battletoads in Battlemaniacs 5/5 for graphics, 4.5/5 for fun factor, and two 4/5 ratings for sound and control.) |
| Hyper | 79% (SNES) |
| Mean Machines Sega | 54% (SMS) |
| Nintendo Power | 3.6/5 (SNES) (Note: Nintendo Power gave Battletoads in Battlemaniacs a 4.2/5 for graphics/sound, 3.5/5 for challenge, and two 3.4/5 ratings for play control and theme/fun.) |
| Super Play | 80% (SNES) |
| VideoGames & Computer Entertainment | 7.6/10 (SNES) (Note: In the review by VideoGames & Computer Entertainment, its main writer gave it a 7/10, while four other editors who provided brief comments gave it a 6/10, 9/10, and two 8/10 ratings.) |
| Sega Power | 72% (SMS) |
| SNES Force | 68% (SNES) |

Retrospective reviews (SNES)

Review scores
| Publication | Score |
|---|---|
| 1UP | 64% |
| AllGame | 3.5/5 |
| Digital Press | 9.5/10 |
| Eyes on Nintendo | 82% (Single-player); 86% (Multi-player) |
| The Video Game Critic | D+ |

GameRankings, a game review aggregator, assigned Battletoads in Battlemaniacs for the SNES an averaged score of 78% based on two reviews. Retrospectively, the staff of GamesRadar ranked the SNES version as the 30th best game on the platform, praising it for having "some of the best graphics on the system" and offering "one hell of an experience," stating: "The bosses are massive, the music is rockin', and the ever-present '90s attitude is in full effect—who cares if it's a cynical knock-off of TMNT when it looks and plays this good?" In 2013, Arcade Sushi ranked it as the fourth best retro game in the beat 'em up genre. In 2018, Complex listed the game #39 on their The Best Super Nintendo Games of All Time writing: "Battletoads in Battlemanaics doesn't quite live up to the original, but it's an awesome ride all the same. And it's not as hard.

Andy Smith from Sega Power gave the Master System version 72%, praising the game for its "varied types of action" and "occasional humorous touches", but criticizing it for its "mediocre graphics", "button-stabbing tendencies" and its high difficulty. Smith's most common complaint was the game's lack of originality, explaining that "Battletoads had shades of originality. Battlemaniacs just has shades." He described the game as "showing signs of rapid aging."
