= Battletoads/Double Dragon =

1993 video game

- North American NES box art
- Developer: Rare
- Publishers: NA: Tradewest; EU: Nintendo (NES) Sony Imagesoft (SNES, GB)
- Programmers: Mark Betteridge; Paul Machacek (GB)
- Artist: Steve Mayles
- Composer: David Wise
- Series: Battletoads; Double Dragon
- Platforms: NES, Genesis, Super NES, Game Boy
- Release: NES: NA: June 1993; EU: October 1993; Genesis: NA: 1993; Super NES, Game Boy: NA: December 1993; EU: July 10, 1994
- Genre: Beat 'em up
- Modes: Single-player, multiplayer (except on the Game Boy)

Battletoads/Double Dragon (fully titled Battletoads & Double Dragon - The Ultimate Team) is a 1993 beat 'em up developed by Rare and published by Tradewest. It was originally released for the Nintendo Entertainment System and later ported to the Mega Drive/Genesis, Super NES, and Game Boy. The SNES version was released on the Nintendo Classics service in September 2024; it was the game's first re-release as it was not released on the Rare Replay collection.

The Ultimate Team is a crossover of Technos Japan's Double Dragon and Rare's Battletoads game franchises, although Technos had little or no credited involvement in production beyond providing the Double Dragon license. The game features the characters from the Double Dragon series, Billy and Jimmy Lee, two young martial arts experts; also included are the three humanoid toad protagonists from the Battletoads game. It is also the first Battletoads game to feature all three toads as playable characters. The game's engine and design are directly based upon the Battletoads series.

== Plot ==
After she was defeated by the Battletoads, the evil Dark Queen flees to the outer reaches of the universe and the 'Toads and their mentor get on with their lives. However, one day the Earth's military is neutralized and the giant spaceship Colossus emerges from the Moon. Apparently, the Dark Queen is back with another plan to dominate the galaxy, and she has allied herself with the Shadow Warriors (from the Double Dragon series) to supplement her forces. Deciding to even the odds, the Battletoads contact Billy and Jimmy Lee for help. The brothers agree, and all five immediately take off for the Colossus in a mission to stop this two-pronged threat.

The first level of the seven-level game takes place on the tail of Colossus, the second on the interior corridors of the ship in level two, the third in the ship's base, and the fourth where the player attempts to destroy the ship from the outside while on a small space craft. The fourth level is where the beat 'em up game turns into a shooter, and the Dark Queen throws asteroids, mines, and UFOs at the spacecraft controlled by the player. Although the ship is successfully destroyed, the Dark Queen and the Shadow Boss survive by escaping in a missile hull, thus making the fifth level's goal to board it. The final two stages are boss battles with the Shadow Boss (stage six) and the Dark Queen (stage seven).

== Gameplay ==
The Super NES version has the Battletoad Pimple fighting against the Double Dragon boss character Roper (Willy).

Battletoads/Double Dragon is a beat 'em up video game where the players, as either one of the three Battletoads or Jimmy and Billy, attack enemies, swing ropes, go on spaceships, and turbo bike to defeat the Shadow Boss and Dark Queen. It has three play modes: a single-player, a "2 Players A" mode where the players can hit each other, and a "2 Players B" that doesn't have that. Its engine and gameplay is from the original Battletoads, and less like Double Dragon. Like the prior Battletoads installment, there are only three continues and no password system, and in the two-player modes, if one player loses all lives, both players have to start a level over. The 16-bit versions have identical gameplay to their NES counterparts, attacks and jumping are triggered by only two buttons.

The player has a choice of five playable characters: Billy and Jimmy Lee from Double Dragon, and Zitz, Pimple, and Rash from Battletoads. All of the toads are equipped with their usual "Smash Hit" attacks, such as big punches ("Kiss-My-Fist"), big kicks ("Big Bad Foot"), double-handed hits ("Nuclear Knuckles"), headbutt ("Battletoad Butt"), a wrecking-ball-like charge used while hanging on a cable ("BT Bashing Ball"), kicks while hanging on a rope ("Swingin' Size Thirteens"), a pick-up and throwing of enemies ("Take Out the Trash"), backward kicks while riding a speeder bike ("Bikin' Bash"), walker leg bashes ("No Way Back Thwack"), and enemy slamming ("Twin Side Slam"), with a new attack being a kick while hanging on a ledge named "Back 'N Front Punt." Likewise, the Lee twins' Dragon Force techniques are playable, such as spin kick, knee drops, and elbow-drops. New abilities include hanging off of and moving across sides of platforms, and kicking off enemies while doing so, although the player can fall off and lose a life if other enemies step on his fingers.

== Development ==
Battletoads/Double Dragon was developed by the company that handled the 1991 Battletoads game, Rare, which produced several games as contract work for other intellectual properties in the late 1980s and early 1990s; the 1993 crossover was one of them, and its development involved Rare receiving little feedback from the owners of the Double Dragon license.

The NES version features 3D scrolling and other advanced special effects uncommonly sophisticated for the console. The Game Boy version is similar to the NES version, but it is only for one player. The sprites are the same size although the screen is smaller (leaving less room for movement) and the 3D effects are absent. The logo on the game cover art is one of Rare's first uses of 3D graphics.

== Reception ==
=== Contemporaneous ===
Reception

Review scores
Publication	Score			
Publication	Game Boy	NES	Sega Genesis	SNES
AllGame	N/A	4.5/5	N/A	2.5/5
Consoles +	N/A	N/A	N/A	79%
Electronic Gaming Monthly	N/A	7.25/10 (Note: In Electronic Gaming Monthly's review of the NES version, two critics gave it an 8/10, one a 7/10, and another a 6/10.)	N/A	8.2/10 (Note: In Electronic Gaming Monthly's very brief review of the SNES version, four critics gave it an 8/10, and another a 9/10.)
GameFan	N/A	N/A	N/A	77.5% (Note: GameFan's review of the SNES version was done by four critics, who awarded it different percentages: 79%, 74%, 80%, and 77%.)
GamePro	N/A	3.75/5 (Note: GamePro gave the NES version two 3.5/5 ratings for graphics and sounds and two 4/5 scores for control and fun factor.)	N/A	3.5/5 (Note: GamePro gave the SNES version two 3.5/5 ratings for graphics and sounds, a 3/5 for control and 4/5 for fun factor.)
GameSpy	N/A	8/10	N/A	N/A
Mega Fun	59% (Note: Mega Fun gave the Game Boy version two 62% scores for graphics and fun and 53% for sound.)	N/A	N/A	N/A
Nintendo Power	3.25/5 (Note: Nintendo Power gave the Game Boy version 3/5 for graphics and sound, 3.5/5 for play control, 2.5/5 for challenge, and 4/5 for theme/fun.)	3.58/5 (Note: Nintendo Power gave the NES version 3.1/5 for graphics and sound, 3.4/5 for play control, and two 3.9/5 scores for challenge and theme/fun.)	N/A	3.38/5 (Note: Nintendo Power gave the SNES version 3.6/5 for graphics and sound, 3.2/5 for play control, 3.3/5 for challenge, and 3.4/5 for theme/fun.)
Official Nintendo Magazine	N/A	82/100	N/A	N/A
Super Play	N/A	N/A	N/A	37%
Total!	N/A	90%	N/A	N/A
VideoGames & Computer Entertainment	N/A	44/50 (Note: In VideoGames & Computer Entertainment's review of the NES version, its main writer and three of the four editors that gave brief comments gave it a 9/10, while one editor awarded it an 8/10.)	7/10	N/A
Electronic Games	N/A	91%	N/A	N/A
Mega	N/A	N/A	42%	N/A
Play Time	N/A	N/A	N/A	52% (Note: Play Time gave SNES version 48% for graphics, 53% for sound, and 56% for fun.)
Total! (Germany)	2.5/6 (Note: Total! Germany gave the Game Boy version two 3/6 scores for gameplay and sound, and two 2/6 scores for graphics and replay value.)	N/A	N/A	N/A

Nintendo Power asserted that the game has confusing depth perception, but "great action, graphics and theme make this one of the strongest titles this year", and is better than Battletoads in Battlemaniacs (1993). Its staff rated it as the second-best NES game of 1993. The NES version was nominated for Nintendo Power Awards 1993 in the categories "Graphics & Sound", "Theme & Fun", "Play Control", "Villain" (The Dark Queen), and "The Best Overall Game".

Electronic Gaming Monthly's Steve Harris, reviewing the NES version, loved its "side-scrolling techniques", "nice" attack combos, and combination of game licenses, but found the graphics too average even for 8-bit technology and the controls "slightly haphazard". Another critic from GamePro disappointed with the NES game's graphics enjoyed the character animation, particularly when it came to the bosses and the playable characters' attacks; however, he also criticized the cutscenes and level designs, for replacing the "pizazz" and vibrant colors of the previous Battletoads installment with "a flat, 2D appearance and almost robotic animation". He reported problems of disappearing sprites during "hectic fighting scenes". Other reviews, such as Electronic Gaming Monthly critic Martin Alessi and Mike Weigand of Electronic Games, found the visuals amazing for an 8-bit game, citing its parallax scrolling effects. Critics from GameFan called the SNES version superior to the Genesis version for its better presentation in color, detail, effects, and sound.

Alessi, Weigand, and Ed Semrad praised the two-player mode, attacks, moves, and fast-paced gameplay. Weigand praised the challenging gameplay and noted aspects of it that make it more forgiving that the previous Battletoads game, such as not having to re-do the speed bike section if the player falls off a bike. Sushi-X, however, brought up unfair elements to the difficulty, such as "enormously cheap kills in many areas, like being knocked into pits and unblock-able attacks".

Mega Fun, reviewing the Game Boy version, stated that it benefitted from diversity when it came to playable characters, enemies, and backgrounds but lacked the "unusual" elements of other Battletoads games. Reviews of the Game Boy version frequently critiqued the graphics and music; Mega Fan criticized the small sprites for not giving the player a clear perspective of what is going on sometimes, and Michael Koczy of the German edition of Total! wrote the game had "poor animation," "average" music, and toads that were hard to distinguish between each other. Mr. Goo of GameFan critiqued the small sprite size.

A GameFan reviewer was critical of the inclusion of Double Dragon characters, reasoning that the franchise was past its prime.

VideoGames & Computer Entertainment journalist Chris Bieniek opined the NES version's graphics was exceptional as expected for a late-era game, but received little improvement in the Genesis version.

=== Retrospective ===
The visuals were praised, particularly the humorous attack animations, and vibrant colors. Matt Hull of Hardcore Gaming 101, reviewing the NES version, praised the humor of the moves and sound effects, "superb" music, "very smooth" controls, and for having the same 16-bit-looking graphics as the prior Battletoads game, particularly the animation, backgrounds, parallax scrolling, and the Colossus. He said, "You'll see parts of the spaceship moving and it just looks so fluid/smooth that I can't believe that it's 8 bit!"

The Video Game Critic called the stages "fully interactive and full of surprises". Hull appreciated its more forgiving difficulty in comparison to the original Battletoads, Thornburg stated it was still unfair at times, noting "unbalanced fights", "moving down a rope too fast for the screen and being killed by seemingly nothing or being overcrowded by enemies at the most frustrated moments".

The combination of the Battletoads and Double Dragon properties were well-received, with Skyler Miller of AllGame opining that "Rare does a fine job at connecting the two universes without making it seem forced or arbitrary." However, some reviewers found problems in presenting the Double Dragon property, such as Double Dragon II's Burnov being the Shadow Boss instead of Jimmy, and Roper being misnamed.

An AllGame critic, Brett Alan Weiss, was harsh on the SNES version, calling it "an unnecessary creation, except to line the pockets of the companies involved", and too similar in looks and gameplay to its 8-bit counterpart, thus not taking enough advantage of the 16-bit console's capabilities. His other criticisms were the "slow" controls, "jerky" character movements, and poor audio, writing that "the sound effects are boring and the music is of the pseudo rock 'n' roll variety, replete with drum machine-sounding drums and thoroughly unconvincing guitar riffs."

The game was featured on the lists of "top 11 video game crossovers" by UGO Networks and the 15 most bizarre crossovers in gaming by GamesRadar. It has been ranked the 76th best NES game by IGN. In 2018, Complex listed the game 28th on its "The Best Super Nintendo Games of All Time". In 2023, Time Extension included the NES version on their top 25 "Best Beat 'Em Ups of All Time" list, saying that it "[...] seamlessly blends the two worlds together, unshackling Double Dragon from its archaic routes and curbing the difficulty of Battletoads to create an excellent entry point for either series or just a fun, well made one-off.".
