= Tradewest =

American video game company

Tradewest, Inc.
- Industry: Video games
- Founded: 1985; 41 years ago
- Defunct: 1994; 32 years ago
- Fate: Merged into Williams and later Midway
- Successor: Williams Entertainment (1994–1996); Midway Home Entertainment (1996–2009); Tradewest Games Holding (2009–2013)
- Headquarters: Corsicana, TX, USA
- Key people: Leland Cook, founder Byron Cook, co-founder John Rowe, co-founder
- Parent: Midway Games
- Subsidiaries: Leland Corporation

Tradewest, Inc. was an American video game company based in Corsicana, Texas that produced numerous games in the 1980s and early 1990s. The company was the publisher of the Battletoads and Double Dragon series in North America and the PAL region. In 1994, the company was acquired by WMS Industries and became Midway Home Entertainment when WMS spun off its video game operations as Midway Games.

The name was revived in August 2009 when the head of Midway's European subsidiaries acquired the trademark from Midway in the latter's bankruptcy.

== History ==
=== Original company ===
Tradewest was founded in 1985 by Leland Cook, his son Byron Cook, and John Rowe. Tradewest started out by manufacturing SNK's Alpha Mission arcade game in the United States, followed by Ikari Warriors and Victory Road before shifting away from the coin-op arcade game business to concentrate on the home console market.

In 1987, Tradewest purchased Cinematronics, a video game developer and manufacturer based in El Cajon, California, whose previous games included Dragon's Lair and Space Ace, and renamed it the Leland Corporation. John Rowe was chosen to run the El Cajon office as he already had a successful history in video games as executive vice-president of SNK's U.S division.

Tradewest operated three companies: Tradewest, Inc, Tradewest International, and the Leland Corporation. It released video games in the late 1980s and early 1990s for consoles mainly from Nintendo and Sega.

In 1994, Tradewest was unsuccessfully sued by Philips Corporation and Lockheed Sanders for an alleged patent infringement in the art of an arcade video game.

=== Dissolution and aftermath ===
Tradewest was acquired in April 1994 by WMS Industries, who owned Midway Games. Tradewest was reorganized as Williams Entertainment, Inc. with Rowe and the two Cooks as its heads, thus signaling the end of Tradewest. Operating as a sister division to Midway, Williams Entertainment was used to enter the home video game console market, allowing WMS to publish home games directly without having to rely on other publishers, such as Acclaim Entertainment, which had held a right-of-first-refusal license to Midway games.

In 1996, Williams Entertainment was placed directly under the control of Midway, who renamed the division Midway Home Entertainment, Inc. Both the Corsicana, Texas, facility and a new R&D facility in San Diego (replacing the El Cajon location) remained open within Midway, who continued to employ Byron Cook (who became president of Midway Home Entertainment) and John Rowe (who became vice-chairman and Director of Product Development). The division developed and published games during the fifth and sixth console generation.

Byron Cook resigned from Midway in 2001. The following year, Midway's head office in Chicago shut down the Corsicana location. John Rowe became the president and CEO of High Moon Studios (formerly Sammy Studios).

On October 19, 2024, The City of Corsicana opened the Campbell Arts Plaza in Downtown Corsicana. Among its murals was an homage to the Tradewest company, depicting a photo of Billy Lee from Double Dragon and Zitz from Battletoads coming out of arcade machines.

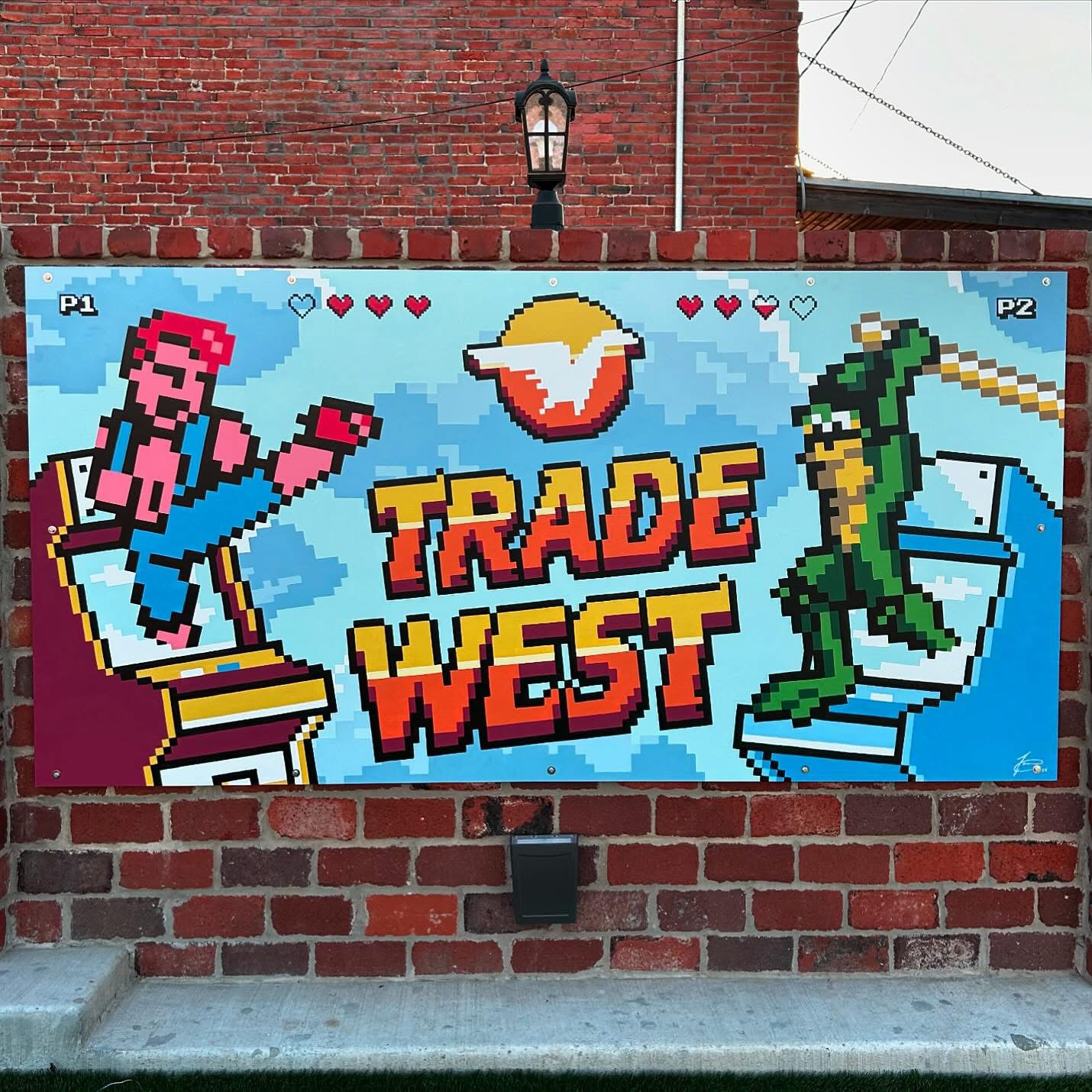
The Campbell Arts Plaza opened in Downtown Corsicana on October 19, 2024. This mural depicts two of the most prominent titles from Tradewest, a Corsicana-based company.

=== European revival ===
15 years after the original American company was acquired and renamed, the Tradewest name was revived in Europe in 2009 by the former Midway UK and France publishing divisions following a management buyout.

On August 19, 2009, Midway Games Ltd (founded in 1999 in London as the English subsidiary of Midway Games Inc) and Midway Games SAS (founded in 2005 in Paris as the French subsidiary of Midway Games Inc) were sold to Spiess Media Holding UG, owned by Martin Spiess (the former head of Midway Games Ltd). A new German holding company, Tradewest Games Holding, was created to own the former Midway subsidiaries, which also took the Tradewest name.

Tradewest Games Holding, along with its subsidiaries, vanished in 2013.

== List of games published ==
=== Arcade ===
- Alpha Mission (1985)
- Ikari Warriors (1986)
- Redline Racer (1986)
- Victory Road (1987)

=== NES ===
- Double Dragon (June 1988)
- John Elway's Quarterback (March 1989)
- Taboo: The Sixth Sense (April 1989)
- Magic Johnson's Fast Break (March 1990)
- Ivan "Ironman" Stewart's Super Off Road (April 1990)
- Solar Jetman: Hunt for the Golden Warpship (September 1990)
- Battletoads (June 1991)
- High Speed (July 1991)
- Danny Sullivan's Indy Heat (August 1992)
- R.C. Pro-Am II (December 1992)
- Battletoads & Double Dragon (June 1993)

=== Game Boy ===
- Double Dragon (August 1990)
- Sneaky Snakes (June 1991)
- Battletoads (November 1991)
- Jack Nicklaus Golf (May 1992)
- Super Off Road (November 1992)
- Battletoads in Ragnarok's World (June 1993)
- Battletoads & Double Dragon (December 1993)

=== Super NES ===
- Super Off Road (December 1991)
- Jack Nicklaus Golf (May 1992)
- Pro Quarterback (September 1992)
- Super Double Dragon (October 15, 1992)
- Battletoads in Battlemaniacs (June 1993)
- Super Baseball 2020 (July 1993)
- Plok (September 1993)
- Super Off Road: The Baja (September 1993)
- Battletoads & Double Dragon (December 1993)
- Fun 'n Games (August 1994)
- Troy Aikman NFL Football (August 1994)
- Double Dragon V: The Shadow Falls (August 5, 1994)

=== Genesis ===
- Championship Pro-Am (May 12, 1992)
- Pro Quarterback (September 1992)
- Battletoads (March 1993)
- Fun 'n' Games (August 2, 1993)
- Battletoads & Double Dragon (December 1993)
- Double Dragon V: The Shadow Falls (August 5, 1994)
- Troy Aikman NFL Football (August 1994)

=== Game Gear ===
- Battletoads (December 1993)
