= Rare (company) =

British video game developer

Rare Limited

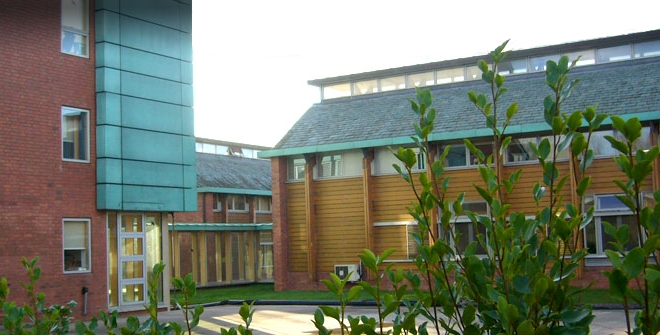
- Headquarters in Twycross
- Type: Subsidiary
- Industry: Video games
- Predecessor: Ultimate Play the Game
- Founded: 1985; 41 years ago
- Founders: Tim Stamper; Chris Stamper
- Headquarters: Twycross, England
- Key people: Joe Neate (co-studio head); Jim Horth (co-studio head)
- Products: List of video games developed by Rare
- Number of employees: 200+ (2020)
- Parent: Xbox Game Studios (2002–2026); Activision (2026–present)
- Website: rare.co.uk

Rare Limited is a British video game developer and a studio of Activision based in Twycross. Rare's games span the platform, first-person shooter, action-adventure, fighting, and racing genres. Its most popular games include the Battletoads, Donkey Kong, and Banjo-Kazooie series, as well as games like GoldenEye 007 (1997), Perfect Dark (2000), Conker's Bad Fur Day (2001), Viva Piñata (2006), and Sea of Thieves (2018).

Tim and Chris Stamper, who also founded Ultimate Play the Game, established Rare in 1985. During its early years, Rare was backed by a generous budget from Nintendo, primarily concentrated on Nintendo Entertainment System (NES) games. During this time, Rare created successful games such as Wizards & Warriors (1987), R.C. Pro-Am (1988), and Battletoads (1991). Rare became a prominent second-party developer for Nintendo, which came to own a large minority stake in the company, with the release of Donkey Kong Country (1994). Throughout the 1990s, Rare started selling their games under the trademark name "Rareware" and received international recognition and critical acclaim for games such as the Donkey Kong Country trilogy (1994–1996), Killer Instinct (1994), GoldenEye 007, Banjo-Kazooie (1998), Perfect Dark (2000), and Conker's Bad Fur Day (2001).

In 2002, Microsoft bought Rare, which retained its original brand, logo, and most intellectual properties. Rare has since focused on developing games exclusively for the Xbox series of consoles, including Grabbed by the Ghoulies (2003), Kameo (2005), Perfect Dark Zero (2005), and Viva Piñata (2006). In 2007, the Stampers left Rare to pursue other opportunities. In 2010, the company's focus shifted to the Xbox Live Avatar and Kinect, releasing three Kinect Sports games over the following years, while other studios were given permission to utilize their existing franchises under supervision, such as Killer Instinct (2013). In 2015, Rare developed Rare Replay, an Xbox One-exclusive compilation containing 30 of its games to celebrate its 30th anniversary. The company's most recent release is 2018's Sea of Thieves, an online multiplayer game which continues to see regular content updates as of 2026. In September of that year, Activision (which was also brought by Microsoft in 2023) became Rare's new parent company after an internal restructure in Microsoft's video game division; up until that point, Rare operated under Xbox Game Studios.

Several former Rare employees have formed their own companies, such as Free Radical Design, best known for producing the TimeSplitters series, and Playtonic Games, best known for Yooka-Laylee (2017). Rare is widely acknowledged in the video game industry and has received numerous accolades from critics and journalists. Rare is also known as a secretive and seclusive studio. Several Rare games, such as Donkey Kong Country and GoldenEye 007, have been cited as among the greatest and most influential games of all time, though many fans and former employees have been critical of the company's output under Microsoft.

== History ==
=== Founding (1985–1993) ===
Rare evolved from the company Ultimate Play the Game, which was founded in Ashby-de-la-Zouch, Leicestershire, by former arcade game developers Tim and Chris Stamper. After multiple critically and commercially successful releases including Jetpac, Atic Atac, Sabre Wulf, and Knight Lore, Ultimate Play The Game was one of the biggest UK-based video game development companies. The ZX Spectrum home computer, the platform for which the company usually developed games, was only popular in the UK, and they believed that working on that platform would not be beneficial to the company's growth as they considered it a "dead end". Meanwhile, the company inspected an imported console from Japan, Nintendo's Famicom, and believed that it would be an ideal future platform of choice for the company as it was more sophisticated than the Spectrum, it had a worldwide market, and its cartridges had no load times. As a result, Rare was established in 1985. Its main goal was to reverse-engineer the console and investigate the codes for Famicom's games to learn more about the console's programming. With successful results, the company decided to sell the Ultimate brand to U.S. Gold, and ceased game development for the ZX Spectrum in the following year.

Nintendo said it was impossible to reverse engineer the console. Using the information the Ultimate Play the Game team acquired from Rare, the team prepared several tech demos and showed them to Nintendo of America president Minoru Arakawa in Kyoto. Impressed with their efforts, Nintendo decided to grant the Ultimate Play the Game team an unlimited budget for them to work on games for the Famicom platform. After they returned to England, they moved from Ashby-de-la-Zouch to Twycross, and established a new studio through Rare. They set their headquarters in a Manor Farmhouse. Rare also set up another company known as Rare, Inc., in Miami, Florida. Headed by Joel Hochberg, the American company was involved in maintaining Rare's operation in the US and contacting major US publishers. Hochberg was previously the vice president of American arcade manufacturer Centuri. The Famicom was eventually released in North America and Europe under the name Nintendo Entertainment System (NES).

My goal at Rare was to bring products that you wouldn't see for six to eight years and make it available as soon as possible.

— Tim Stamper, founder of Rare.

With the unlimited budget, Rare could work a large variety of different games. The first project Rare worked on was Slalom, a downhill skiing game. The company then worked with various gaming publishers that included Tradewest, Acclaim Entertainment, Electronic Arts, Sega, Mindscape, and Gametek to produce sixty games over a five-year period, forty-seven of which were for the NES, while the rest were conversions for the Game Boy and Sega Genesis. They helped in creating new and original intellectual properties, including R.C. Pro-Am, a racing game with vehicular combat elements, and Snake Rattle 'n' Roll, an action platform game with Tim Stamper developing the game's graphics. Rare also developed Battletoads, a beat'em up inspired by the Teenage Mutant Ninja Turtles franchise. The game became known for its extreme difficulty, and upon seeing success, publisher Tradewest published multiple ports for the game, and tasked Rare to develop sequels. Tradewest also gave their own Double Dragon licence to Rare, allowing them to develop a crossover game between the two franchises. Rare released three Battletoads games in 1993, including Battletoads / Double Dragon: The Ultimate Team, Battletoads in Ragnarok's World and Battletoads in Battlemaniacs. The last Battletoads game from that era was released for the arcade in 1994. Several Battletoads games were also ported to some Sega's systems like the Mega Drive/Genesis. Rare worked on licensed properties such as A Nightmare on Elm Street and Hollywood Squares, and ports including Marble Madness, Narc, and Sid Meier's Pirates!.

The development of four of Rare's games were outsourced to Manchester-based Zippo Games, including Wizards & Warriors and the third instalment of the Jetpac series, Solar Jetman: Hunt for the Golden Warship. Rare eventually acquired Zippo Games and renamed them to Rare Manchester. According to Ste Pickford, a Rare team member through the late 80s and the early 90s, Rare just "wanted to make as many games as they could in their 'window of opportunity'". The huge library of games made large profits, but none became a critical success for the company while less creativity and innovation were shown in them.

When the Super Nintendo Entertainment System was conceived, Rare was not yet ready for the change. Rare limited their releases to some Battletoads games and decided to invest their significant NES profit in purchasing expensive Silicon Graphics workstations to make three-dimensional models. This move made Rare the most technologically advanced developer in the UK, and situated them high in the international market. Their priority also changed at that time, as the team decided to focus on quality instead of quantity.

=== Partnership with Nintendo (1994–2002) ===
Rare, using the SGI systems, created a boxing game demo and presented it to Nintendo. As the SNES at that time could not render all of the SGI graphics at once, Rare used the SGI graphics to produce 3D models and graphics, before pre-rendering these graphics onto the cartridge of the SNES system, a process known as "Advanced Computer Modelling". Their progress with the 3D graphics on the SGI systems impressed Nintendo, and in 1994, Nintendo bought a 25% stake in the company that gradually increased to 49%, making Rare a second-party developer for Nintendo. Rare maintained autonomous operations, green-lighting and designing projects without significant involvement from Nintendo.

During this period, Rare started selling their games under the trademark name "Rareware". The company was considered one of Nintendo's key developers and had enough recognition that Nintendo offered Rare the Nintendo catalogue of characters to create a 3D CGI game. The Stampers asked for Donkey Kong. The resulting game was Donkey Kong Country, which was developed by a total of 20 people and enjoyed an 18-month development cycle. Rare staff also visited Twycross Zoo, observing and videotaping real gorillas. The game was a critical success, with critics praising the game's highly advanced visuals and artstyle. Donkey Kong Country sold over nine million copies worldwide, making it the third best-selling game in the SNES library. The game received several Game of the Year honours and was followed by two sequels, Donkey Kong Country 2: Diddy's Kong Quest and Donkey Kong Country 3: Dixie Kong's Double Trouble!, as well as several handheld spin-offs such as the Donkey Kong Land series.

Nintendo's stake purchase allowed Rare to expand significantly. The number of staff members increased from 84 to 250, and Rare moved out from their headquarters at the Manor Farmhouse. Rare also developed a CGI arcade fighting game, Killer Instinct, on their own custom-built arcade machine. Killer Instinct was set to be released for Nintendo's own 64-bit system, the Nintendo 64 in 1995, but was forced to release the game for the 16-bit SNES system, and had to downgrade the game's graphics. Killer Instinct sold 3.2 million copies, and was followed by a sequel, Killer Instinct 2. Killer Instinct Gold, the console version of Killer Instinct 2, suffered from a graphical downgrade due to the compression technology used to fit the arcade version onto the smaller Nintendo 64 cartridge.

Rare then developed Blast Corps for the Nintendo 64. The game sold one million copies, which was considered disappointing by Rare. At that time, Rare was split into several teams, working on different projects. A large-scaled platformer was set to be released afterwards but was delayed. As a result, Rare changed their schedule and released their smaller projects first. The first project was GoldenEye 007, a game based on the James Bond film GoldenEye. The project was led by Martin Hollis and development was conducted by an inexperienced team. Inspired by Sega's Virtua Cop, Goldeneye 007 had originally been an on-rails shooter before the team decided to expand the gameplay and turn it into a free-roaming first-person shooter. New elements, such as stealth, headshot mechanics and reloading, were introduced. A split-screen multiplayer was added to the game by the end of its development. GoldenEye 007 was the first console first-person shooter developed by Rare and it was released two years after the release of the film. The game received critical praise and received numerous awards. Goldeneye 007 remained one of the best-selling games for two years, and sold more than eight million units worldwide.

Rare then developed Diddy Kong Racing, their first self-published game. Originally intended as a real-time strategy game involving cavemen, the game was re-imagined into a racing game prior to its release in 1997. It was one of the fastest selling games at the time, as recorded by The Guinness Book of Records. Diddy Kong Racing also features protagonists from some future Rare games, including Banjo and Conker. At the time, Rare was still working on the large-scale platform game. Originally codenamed Dream: Land of Giants, it was a game featuring a young boy named Edison and pirates. The protagonist was then replaced by a bear known as Banjo, and Rare expanded the role of Kazooie the bird. The two characters were inspired by characters from Disney films and Rare hoped that they could appeal to a younger audience. Banjo-Kazooie was released in June 1998 to critical acclaim. A sequel, Banjo-Tooie, was released in 2000. It was a critical success and it outsold the first game, selling 3 million copies.

Upon the completion of Banjo-Kazooie's development, Hollis immediately began another project. Originally set to be a tie-in for Tomorrow Never Dies, Nintendo and Rare were significantly outbid by Electronic Arts, this however didn’t upset the Goldeneye team at Rare, as they felt they had spent too much time in the Bond universe, and instead develop a new first-person shooter in a new universe with new characters. With a major emphasis on lighting, the game was named Perfect Dark. Hollis left Rare for Nintendo 14 months after the start of Perfect Dark's development. Around the same time, numerous employees left the company and formed new studios. With major project leads departing, a new team took over its development and diminished the role of lighting in the game, making it a more straightforward first-person shooter. The game's troubled development did not affect the progress of Rare's other teams. When Perfect Dark was still in development, Rare released two other games, Jet Force Gemini and Donkey Kong 64. In 1999, Nintendo signed an agreement with Disney, and assigned Rare to develop several racing and adventure games featuring Mickey Mouse. The project later became Mickey's Speedway USA and Mickey's Racing Adventure. Perfect Dark eventually resurfaced and it was released in 2000 to critical acclaim. The game sold approximately 2 million copies.

Conker the Squirrel also had his own game, originally named Conker's Quest; it was later renamed Twelve Tales: Conker 64. However, the new game was criticized for being too family-friendly and its similar gameplay to Banjo-Kazooie. As a result, the team renamed the game Conker's Bad Fur Day and it was re-revealed in 2000. Conker's Bad Fur Day, unlike Banjo-Kazooie, was intended for a mature audience, and features violence, profanity and scatological humour. The game received positive reviews from critics, but was a commercial failure as the game was released at the end of the Nintendo 64's life cycle and was not actively promoted by Nintendo due to its crude content.

After the completion of Diddy Kong Racing, another team was working on a new game known as Dinosaur Planet for the Nintendo 64. However, Nintendo Senior Managing Director Shigeru Miyamoto suggested the team redesign the game as part of the Star Fox series for Nintendo's new console, the GameCube. Unlike previous Star Fox games, Star Fox Adventures focuses on ground-based, open world exploration. The game received positive reviews upon its launch in 2002. Star Fox Adventures was the only game developed by Rare for the GameCube.

=== Microsoft era (2002–present) ===
Game development costs gradually increased, and Nintendo did not provide Rare with more capital nor did they purchase the company's remaining stake. The Stampers were surprised that Nintendo did not directly acquire the studio. Rare looked for potential buyers. In early 2000, workers from Activision and Microsoft began visiting Rare with purchase offers. According to Microsoft's Ed Fries, Nintendo, Activision, and Microsoft then became embroiled in a bidding war for ownership of Rare. Rare expressed interest in Activision's offer, but Microsoft offered more money. On 24 September 2002, Microsoft purchased Rare for $375 million (~$641 million in 2025). Rare became a first-party developer for Microsoft's Xbox. Character trademarks from games developed by Rare for Nintendo consoles, such as Conker of Conker's Bad Fur Day and Banjo of the Banjo-Kazooie series, were retained by Rare; intellectual property created by Nintendo, such as Donkey Kong and Star Fox, were retained by Nintendo. This left Donkey Kong Racing, due for release for the GameCube, unreleased. 30 employees left Rare during the transition.

2010–2015 logo (Green hexagon version)

Since Microsoft was not part of the handheld video-game console market, Rare continued to develop games for Nintendo handheld consoles after the acquisition. In August 2003, Rare and Microsoft entered an agreement with THQ for THQ to publish Rare's games for the Game Boy Advance, including Sabre Wulf, a game based on an Ultimate character; Banjo-Kazooie: Grunty's Revenge, initially intended as a Game Boy Color game, and It's Mr. Pants!, a puzzle game originally developed as Donkey Kong: Coconut Crackers. January 2005 saw the completion of this deal with the release of Banjo-Pilot, known as Diddy Kong Pilot before the Microsoft acquisition.

In 2003, Rare released their first Microsoft game, Grabbed by the Ghoulies, a humorous action-adventure game set in a haunted mansion full of supernatural creatures. Originally intended as a free-roaming game, it was significantly streamlined in design and concept to attract a larger, more casual audience. The game received mixed reviews from critics, and was considered Rare's worst and least-popular game. At E3 2004, Microsoft's Ken Lobb said that Rare had obtained development kits for the Nintendo DS and was working on two games for the Nintendo DS. Shortly afterwards, Microsoft issued a statement that the company and its studios had no plans for Nintendo DS development. However, in July 2005, Rare posted job openings for Nintendo DS development on its website and said that it was creating "key" DS games. Only two were ever released, with the first one being Diddy Kong Racing DS, a remake of the Nintendo 64 title Diddy Kong Racing which was released in February 2007, and the second being Viva Piñata: Pocket Paradise, a life simulation game, released in September 2008.

Rare released Conker: Live & Reloaded, a remake of Conker's Bad Fur Day, in 2005 with updated graphics and a reworked multiplayer option. The game received generally favourable reviews but, similar to Bad Fur Day, was a commercial failure. Xbox successor Xbox 360 was released in 2005, and two of its launch games were developed by Rare: Perfect Dark Zero and Kameo. Zero, a prequel to the first Perfect Dark, was originally intended for GameCube before being reworked as an Xbox 360 game. Rare removed several features to meet the game's release deadline in 2005. Kameo was also intended for the GameCube. A new intellectual property, in it the player character shape-shifts to solve puzzles. Although both received generally positive reviews from critics and sold more than a million copies, they were considered disappointments.

Yet, so much of the money went towards Gears of War, which is going to sell millions anyway. It was a bit of like, "What about the other franchise?" I think we got left in the wake somewhat.

— Software engineer James Thomas, on the marketing campaign for Viva Piñata.

In 2006, the company released Viva Piñata, a game involving gardening. Incorporating elements of several franchises including The Sims, Animal Crossing, and Harvest Moon, it was acclaimed as innovative. The game's commercial performance was a disappointment, however, and some Rare team members questioned Microsoft Studios' large marketing budget for Gears of War and its relative neglect of Viva Piñata. On 2 January 2007, Rare founders Chris and Tim Stamper left the company to "pursue other opportunities". Former lead designer Gregg Mayles became Rare's creative director and Mark Betteridge the company's studio director. That year saw the release of Jetpac Refuelled, a remake of Jetpac for Xbox Live Arcade.

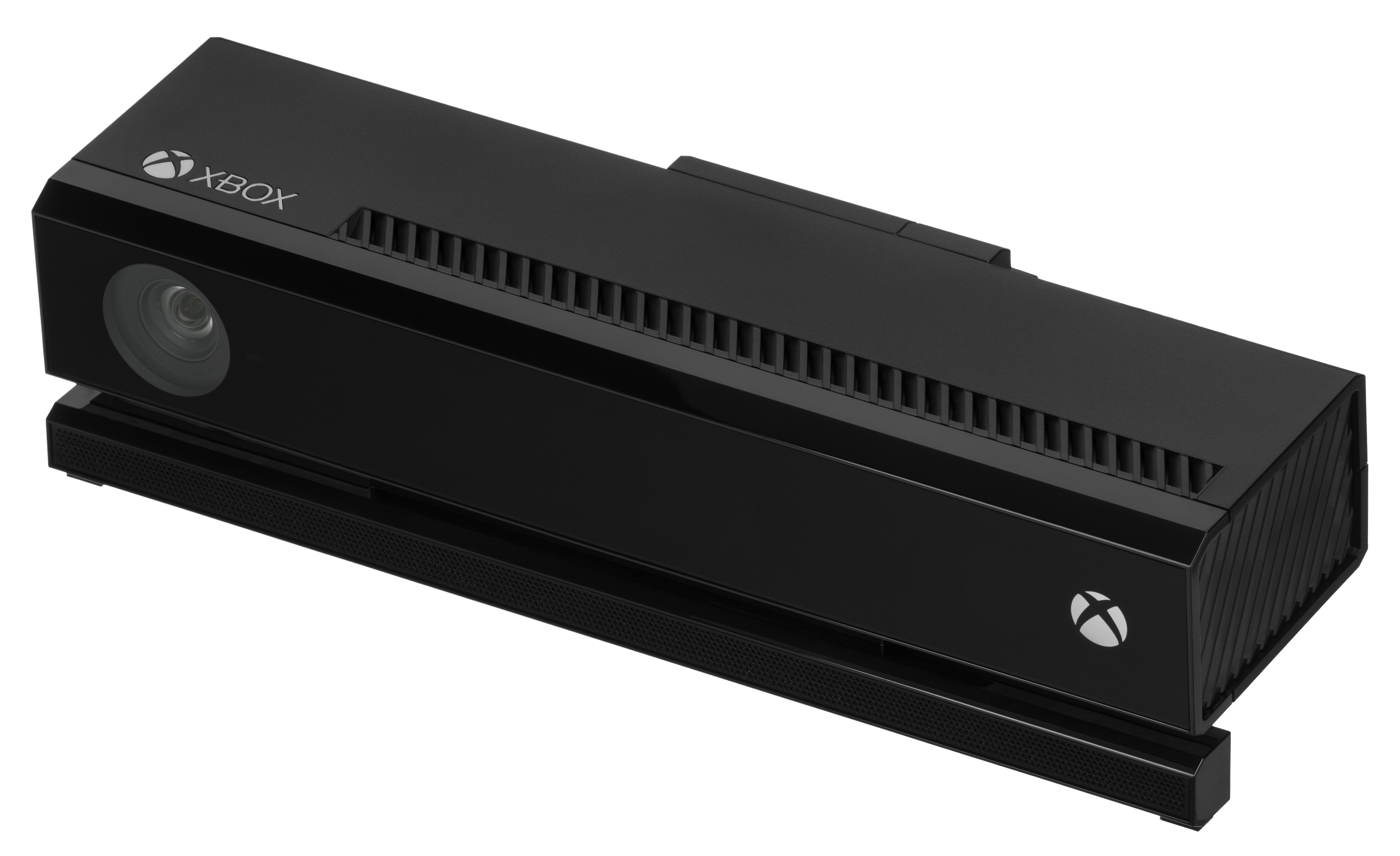
Rare focused on Kinect from 2009 to 2014.

Rare unveiled work on Xbox Live avatars, Viva Piñata: Trouble in Paradise (the next game in the Viva Piñata series), and Banjo-Kazooie: Nuts & Bolts in 2008. Made by the core team that developed the first Banjo-Kazooie, Nuts & Bolts received significant criticism from players due to its focus on vehicle construction rather than traditional platforming. Though generally receiving positive reviews, the company's games for Microsoft sold poorly and Microsoft decided to restructure the studio at the end of the decade. In March 2010, Rare opened a new facility at Fazeley Studios in Digbeth, Birmingham. Later that year, Microsoft confirmed that Scott Henson, a developer who had worked on the hardware and software designs of the Xbox 360 console and Kinect for Xbox 360, replaced Mark Betteridge as studio manager and announced a focus on Xbox Live avatars. Rare also shifted their focus to Kinect. According to Henson, "Kinect will be the main focus for Rare going forwards as it's a very rich canvas. This is just the beginning of an experience that will touch millions of people". Rare's first Kinect project, Kinect Sports, was released in November 2010. Originally titled Sports Star, a more-complex sports simulation game, the game was streamlined into what Microsoft executive Don Mattrick hoped would be the Kinect equivalent of Wii Sports. According to a former Rare employee, the team was worried about the game during its development because of Kinect's limitations. Its reviews were average, but it was a commercial success, selling three million units by May 2011. Rare and BigPark, another Microsoft studio, collaborated on the development of a sequel, Kinect Sports: Season Two.

In March 2011, Scott Henson announced that Craig Duncan, who had worked on Sonic & Sega All-Stars Racing and the Colin McRae Rally series, was hired as senior studio director. Simon Woodroffe, who had worked at several studios (including Adventure Soft, Midway Games, Ubisoft, and Sega), became the studio's creative director in April 2012. A Rare property, Killer Instinct, was revived in 2013. The company had a supporting role in its development, assisting lead developer Double Helix Games. Another Rare mascot, Conker, was also featured in another Microsoft game, Project Spark as episodic downloadable content. Known as Conker's Big Reunion, it was cancelled in 2015.

Are they gonna go: Rare is back? And what my answer would be is, Rare has never gone away. We've just changed and made different types of games.

— Craig Duncan, head of Rare on their "next project" in 2014.

Rare released Kinect Sports Rivals in 2014. The game was worked on by 150 staff members and a new game engine was developed for it. The game was a commercial failure and following Microsoft's announcement that Kinect would no longer be a priority, about 15 Rare employees were laid off. On 10 February 2015, a group of former Rare employees announced the formation of a new studio, Playtonic Games, and planned a "spiritual successor" to the Banjo-Kazooie franchise titled Yooka-Laylee, which was released on 11 April 2017 with mixed reviews. According to Rare composer Robin Beanland, the year 2015 would be significant for the company. At E3 2015, a new compilation game, Rare Replay celebrating the studio's 30th anniversary, was introduced; it was released in August. The compilation's thirty titles only included games to which Rare owned the intellectual property. Rare Replay became the most pre-ordered game shown at E3 that year and received critical acclaim upon launch. A new game, Sea of Thieves, a multiplayer adventure game marketed as "The Best Game That Rare Has Ever Made", was introduced at E3 that year. It was delayed at the following year's conference and was released on 20 March 2018. The game received mixed reviews, but was a commercial success; in January 2020, Microsoft declared it the most successful IP it released in the eighth generation, with more than 10 million players. The game was also released on the PlayStation 5, marking it as Rare's first product on a PlayStation console.

In 2018, Rare collaborated with Dlala Studios to oversee the studio's work on a Battletoads revival for the Xbox One and Windows, which was released in 2020. Rare would also reconnect with Nintendo in 2019 through the addition of Banjo & Kazooie as playable characters in the crossover fighting game Super Smash Bros. Ultimate for the Nintendo Switch as well as re-releases of their games on Nintendo Switch Online. At the X019 event in November 2019, Rare announced it was developing Everwild, an action-adventure game for Windows and Xbox Series X/S. As of January 2020, Rare had more than 200 employees, after growing at a consistent pace for five years. On October 14, 2024, Microsoft announced that Duncan would be promoted to head of Xbox Game Studios in November to succeed the outgoing Alan Hartman, with Joe Neate and Jim Horth to succeed him as studio heads.

In July 2025, Microsoft cancelled Everwild amidst significant layoffs in Microsoft divisions; the game's director Gregg Mayles, a longtime Rare employee, later left the company in October. In September 2026, Matt Booty announced on the XBOX Wire that Rare would be moved from the Xbox Game Studios division to Activision, alongside World's Edge.

== Culture ==
According to Mark Betteridge, one of Rare's main goals is to create games people will find enjoyable rather than just to earn profit. The Stamper brothers gave the team considerable creative freedom, although they would intervene if a product was technically flawed or under-performing. Some employees noted that working for Rare in its early days could be difficult, with staff members allowed 30 minutes for lunch and possibly working more than 60 hours a week. Nintendo worked closely with Rare, and their relationship was described as a "creative partnership" by Viva Piñata designer Justin Cook. According to Hansen in 2010, innovation is very important to the company, thus they focus on trying out new technology, such as Xbox 360's Kinect. Historically the company has developed only for video game consoles, never for personal computers, with the Stamper brothers citing a preference for working on a stable standard format which is specifically designed for playing games. According to Duncan in 2014, Rare would only develop games that had unique ideas, and will never develop a generic game with their intellectual properties.

Everybody likes to create this narrative that Microsoft are evil, but that's not the case – they were very supportive. I guess there were a few people who have since left who thought: 'I wanted to be working on this game or my pet project, and I didn't get to.' And they've kind of painted a picture that it's all Microsoft's fault.

— Gavin Price, former Rare employee and founder of Playtonic Games, about Microsoft.

Ed Fries, head of Microsoft Studios' publishing division at the time of acquisition, said that the company attempted to preserve Rare's culture so its staff could continue feeling that they worked for Rare rather than Microsoft. Rare employees differed about working conditions after the Microsoft acquisition. According to Star Fox Adventures lead engineer Phil Tossell, conditions became more stressful after an "imperceptible" start, and the culture of the two companies began clashing. Tossell said that Microsoft gradually imposed a corporate structure on Rare, including more performance reviews and meetings, to which some Rare members found difficulty in adapting. Some admitted that early changes, such as permitting team members to discuss projects they were not working on and allowing staff members to use the Internet or listen to music during work hours, were beneficial to team morale. Betteridge called the overall change "positive", saying that Microsoft's capital could help Rare develop their projects. Former Rare employee Gavin Price said that some Microsoft executives, such as Phil Spencer, were supportive of the developer. Grant Kirkhope, a former composer at Rare, strongly criticised Microsoft following the acquisition. Former Xbox executive Peter Moore voiced his disappointment with Rare's works after the acquisition. He noted that Rare employees were attempting to "recreate the glory years", but their skills had become outdated and were no longer "applicable in today's market". Duncan insisted that there were still a lot of talented people working at Rare, and they will have a "bright future".

Unlike other software developers, Rare acquired a reputation for secrecy; the approach to their office buildings, in Manor Park near Twycross, was monitored by cameras. The company was internally divided into different barns where employees worked exclusively on their group's game. According to Tim Stamper,

Rare has a different philosophy. We don't really have much contact with other game development companies and we just do things the way they've evolved. We try to employ people who are great games players and games enthusiasts and they're really interested in seeing the other games we're developing in the company, so it's really a group of games enthusiasts all working together to produce the best games they can – that's Rare.

— Tim Stamper, February 2003 Video Games Daily interview

Though normally secretive, Rare allowed several exclusive tours of its studio by fansites Rarenet in 1999, Rare-Extreme in 2004 and again in 2009, as well as by the website Eurogamer in 2006. In 2010, Rare declined an offer by fansite MundoRare to film a documentary about their studios at MundoRare's expense. The film, to celebrate Rare's 25th anniversary, would have been distributed on the internet and Xbox Live. Rare refused permission to shoot the film, saying that it was not "on message". MundoRare was shut down, and stated that the site could not support the company's new corporate direction. Rare's secrecy was criticised by Hardcore Gamer's Alex Carlson, as they thought that it made them "disconnected", and prompted them to develop games that "their fans don't want". When Duncan took over as the studio's head, he intended to change the culture of the studio. Rare's office was completely remodeled so as to facilitate idea sharing between team members. The studio also adopted a more open attitude to its community, with the studio inviting fans to take part in the development project of their latest game Sea of Thieves.

In 2025, to celebrate Rare's 40th anniversary, 8BitDo released a limited edition controller for Xbox Series X and Series S featuring the Rare logo and Sea of Thieves branding. Sea of Thieves also saw the release of a new hat cosmetic in-game.

== Related companies ==
Beginning in 1997, a number of Rare employees left to establish separate companies. The first of these was Eighth Wonder, underwritten by Sony Computer Entertainment Europe. The studio did not produce any games before it closed.

After Martin Hollis left Rare, he joined Nintendo before founding his own company Zoonami, which developed Zendoku, Go! Puzzle and Bonsai Barber.

Several Perfect Dark team members, including David Doak and Steve Ellis, founded Free Radical Design and created the TimeSplitters series. The studio would be acquired by Crytek and renamed Crytek UK before its 2014 closure, with most of its staff moving to Deep Silver Dambuster Studios. Deep Silver briefly reestablished Free Radical Design from 2021 to 2023, with original founding members Ellis and Doak heading up the revived studio. Other former Free Radical and Rare staff (including Free Radical co-founder Ellis) formed Crash Lab, a studio specialising in developing iOS games.

Two former Rare employees, Alex Zoro and Jonny Ambrose, were among the six co-founders of FreeStyleGames in 2002, which became known for work on music games, such as the Guitar Hero series for Activision. In 2008, FreeStyleGames was acquired by Activision, and then sold to Ubisoft in 2017, becoming Ubisoft Leamington before closing in 2025. After leaving FreeStyleGames, Zoro founded Pixel Toys, while Ambrose left game development to focus on automobile sculptures, starting Ambrose Auto Art.

Conker's Bad Fur Day director Chris Seavor founded Gory Detail with Rare employee Shawn Pile. Gory Detail released Parashoot Stan for mobile devices, as well as The Unlikely Legend of Rusty Pup on Steam.

Starfire Studios was founded by four former Rare employees and released Fusion Genesis, an Xbox Live Arcade game published by Microsoft Game Studios. Another group of former Rare employees formed a mobile-game studio, Flippin Pixels.

Former Rare employee Lee Schuneman headed Lift London, a Microsoft studio.

Phil Tossell and Jennifer Schneidereit founded Nyamyam and released Tengami.

Playtonic Games was founded by several former Rare employees in 2014. They are best known for the Yooka-Laylee series, with the first game being a spiritual successor to Banjo-Kazooie.

Rare founders Chris and Tim Stamper joined FortuneFish, a mobile game company founded by Tim's son, Joe Stamper. Their first game was That Bouncy Thing! The Rubbishiest Game Ever for Android.

Chameleon Games was created in 2019 by several ex-Rare developers, including Omar Sawi, Kevin Bayliss, and Richard Vaucher. The studio made Tamarin, a 3D action platformer, for PlayStation 4, Windows, Xbox One, and Xbox Series X/S. It is considered a spiritual successor to Jet Force Gemini with the game's music being composed by David Wise.

== Games ==
Rare has developed a number of video games since its founding, with sales nearing 90 million copies by 2002. The company is best known for its platform games, which include the Donkey Kong Country, Banjo-Kazooie, and Conker series, and for its Nintendo 64 first-person shooters GoldenEye 007 and Perfect Dark. Rare does not adhere to a few specific video-game genres. They have also developed action-adventure games, including Star Fox Adventures and Kameo; fighting games, such as the Killer Instinct series; racing games, such as R.C. Pro-Am and Diddy Kong Racing, and beat 'em up-shoot 'em up games such as Battletoads and Captain Skyhawk. Rare's most recent release is Sea of Thieves (2018), an open world pirate-themed sandbox game for Xbox One and Windows 10; the title continues to be supported as a live service game and has since been ported to Xbox Series X and Series S and PlayStation 5. The studio also assisted on the development of Battletoads (2020).

The company has several publicly-known cancelled projects, some of which saw official announcements by either Rare or its publisher prior to their cancellations. These include Dream: Land of Giants, which became Banjo-Kazooie; Perfect Dark Core, originally the sequel to the first Perfect Dark; Black Widow, an open world game that tasks players to control an eight-legged robot; Sundown, which featured a horde-like survival mode; The Fast and the Furriest, a mascot racer; Tailwind, an action game featuring helicopters; Urchin, a Fable-style game which began development after the completion of Live & Reloaded; Ordinary Joe; Savannah, a Kinect-based game; Kinect equivalents of Wii Fit and Professor Layton: a sequel to Diddy Kong Racing; a sequel to Kameo; and Everwild, an action adventure game with God game elements.

== Awards ==
Rare received numerous awards, including BAFTA award for "Best UK Developer" for its work on GoldenEye 007. In 1997, Electronic Gaming Monthly named Rare "Most Promising Game Company", citing their high rate of success in putting out killer apps for the Nintendo 64. Rare was awarded the BAFTA Interactive Entertainment Moving Images Award in 2000 for developing Perfect Dark. Tim and Chris Stamper were named as Development Legends in the 2015 Develop Industry Excellence Awards. Rare was included as Gamasutra's Top 30 Developers of All Time, and was ranked as the 36th best video game maker by IGN. The Herbert Art Gallery and Museum curated a retrospective of the company's work in 2018.
