= Viva Piñata (disambiguation) =

Viva Piñata may refer to:

- Viva Piñata, a video game series
  - Viva Piñata (video game), a video game released for Xbox 360 in 2006 and Microsoft Windows in 2007
  - Viva Piñata: Trouble in Paradise, the sequel to Viva Piñata
  - Viva Piñata: Pocket Paradise, a Nintendo DS version of the original game
  - Viva Piñata (TV series), a television series released in conjunction with the original game
  - Viva Piñata: Party Animals, a party game set in the Viva Piñata universe
