= Steve Burke (composer) =

British video game composer

Steven Burke
- Genres: Orchestral music
- Occupations: Musician, composer, sound designer
- Years active: 1995–present
- Labels: Sumthing Else Works, Materia Collective
- Website: SteveBurkeMusic.com

Steve Burke is a British video game composer, sound designer and voice actor. He is mostly known for his work at the British video game developer Rare.

== Background and career ==
Burke was involved with music from early age. At home his family had a piano, which Burke played nearly every day. He also was playing the clarinet at Manx Youth Orchestra. Aged 20, Burke moved to London and studied at music branch of King's College London. Then, he graduated from Royal College of Music with a master's degree. At college, Burke often went to film recording sessions where he met such the masters of orchestra such as John Williams and Michael Kamen.

After college he was composing for films about a year before he was recruited by video game giant Rare in early 2001. He firstly provided additional music for Star Fox Adventures, but his first major and most successful work at the studio was the soundtrack for 2005 game Kameo: Elements of Power. The soundtrack was scored with the City of Prague Philharmonic Orchestra. The game's music was well received and was nominated for several awards. He also scored Viva Piñata (with Grant Kirkhope), Jetpac Refuelled, Viva Piñata: Pocket Paradise (with David Wise) and Viva Piñata: Trouble in Paradise (again with Kirkhope). Aside from soundtracks, Burke also made sound effects for Perfect Dark Zero, Conker: Live and Reloaded and Banjo-Kazooie: Nuts and Bolts. He also had done additional voice acting for all games above.

In August 2009, Burke left Rare. In November 2010, Burke created all sound and music for Xbox Live Avatars. The work was done as a part of his former relationship with Rare, who were bought out by Microsoft in 2002. Most recently Burke co-composed music for ex-Rare developers Playtonic Games in Yooka-Laylee, along with David Wise and Grant Kirkhope.

== Works ==
Title	Year	Notes
EverQuest: The Scars of Velious	2000	Additional game designers
EverQuest: The Shadows of Luclin	2001	Game designers
Starfox Adventures	2002	Performed various instruments.
No One Lives Forever 2: A Spy in H.A.R.M.'s Way	2002	Special thanks
Kameo: Elements of Power	2005	
Conker: Live & Reloaded	2005	Sound design.
Perfect Dark Zero	2005	Field recording
Viva Pinata	2006	Sound design and additional music, with Grant Kirkhope.
Jetpac Refuelled	2007	
Banjo-Kazooie: Nuts & Bolts	2008	Sound design ("Clanging And Banging").
Viva Pinata: Trouble in Paradise	2008	Sound design and additional music, with Kirkhope.
Viva Piñata: Pocket Paradise	2008	Viva Pinata Team
Fusion Genesis	2011	
Fusion: Sentient	2011	
Fable Heroes	2012	Additional music, with Robin Beanland.
Rare Replay	2015	Special thanks
Goldilocks and Little Bear	2015	
How We Soar	2016	
Yooka-Laylee	2017	With Kirkhope and David Wise.
Raging Justice	2018	
Yooka-Replaylee	2025	With Kirkhope, Matt Griffin, Daniel Murdoch and David Wise

Voice acting

Title	Role(s)
Conker: Live and Reloaded	Additional voices
Perfect Dark Zero	Additional voices
Kameo: Elements of Power	Additional voices
Banjo-Kazooie: Nuts and Bolts	Mumbo Jumbo, Lord of Games, Bottles
Viva Pinata: Trouble in Paradise	Sarsgorilla
