= Gregg Mayles =

British video game designer (born 1971)

- Born: 29 April 1971 (age 55); Coalville, Leicestershire, England
- Occupation: Video game designer
- Employer: Rare (1989–2025)
- Known for: Battletoads; Donkey Kong Country series; Banjo-Kazooie series; Grabbed by the Ghoulies; Viva Piñata; Sea of Thieves

Gregg Mayles (born 29 April 1971) is a British video game designer who previously worked for the video game company Rare as creative director. Between 1989 and 2025, Mayles was one of the longest-serving members of the studio Rare, having designed games for the company since Battletoads (1991), in addition to Donkey Kong Country (1994) and Donkey Kong Country 2: Diddy's Kong Quest (1995). Mayles also created the Banjo-Kazooie franchise. After Rare was acquired by Microsoft in 2002, Mayles designed Grabbed by the Ghoulies (2003) and Viva Piñata (2006), in addition to directing Sea of Thieves (2018).

== Career ==
Mayles began his career as a designer of the Battletoads series and the Donkey Kong Country series, and was one of the creators of the characters Diddy Kong and King K. Rool. After his work on DKC, he came up with an idea about an action-adventure game influenced by his recent work on the series. The project was greenlit for release first on the Super Nintendo Entertainment System and then on the Nintendo 64. Codenamed Project Dream, the game was to be about a boy who went on a magical adventure to a pirate island. The concept was scrapped, and the hero was changed to a bear based on one from Diddy Kong Racing with a backpack, with the latter inspired by Mayles' trip to Japan. This became the critically acclaimed Banjo-Kazooie series.

After the success of Banjo-Kazooie, Mayles did additional design on Donkey Kong 64, which was based on the concept of Mayles's project. Then, Mayles directed the long-awaited sequel, Banjo-Tooie, which was even more acclaimed than its predecessor. After Banjo-Tooie, Mayles did design on Conker's Bad Fur Day and Star Fox Adventures. Mayles directed the design of the 2003 game Grabbed by the Ghoulies, which was reviewed poorly by the press. The game's protagonist, Cooper, resembles Mayles himself. Then he worked on some other projects before playing a key role in creating the game Viva Piñata. It first came to life as an idea from Tim Stamper, and then it resulted in a full game influenced by the Animal Crossing and Story of Seasons series. It was released in 2006 and was well received. Mayles also took part in designing its sequel, Viva Piñata: Trouble in Paradise.

In 2006, Mayles decided to go back to his roots, and started a new Banjo-Kazooie project with a new feature: car building. It was announced at X06, and was titled Banjo-Kazooie: Nuts & Bolts. The game was released in 2008. After Nuts & Bolts, Mayles did work on the Xbox 360 version of Sonic & Sega All-Stars Racing and on Kinect Sports. Mayles also served as the creative director for 2018's Sea of Thieves; one of the in-game songs is named in his honour.

In 2007, Tim and Chris Stamper left Rare to "pursue other opportunities", and Mark Betteridge, along with Mayles, replaced them as studio director and creative director, respectively. Mayles also donates money for poor children. He started a "Very Purple Marathon" in April 2009. The marathon was supported by Rare itself, donating 2,110 euros. His younger brother is video game artist Steve Mayles, who also worked at Rare from 1992 to 2014.

In October 2025, after the reported cancellation of Everwild, Mayles has now resigned from Rare.

== Works ==
Year	Title	Platform(s)	Director	Designer	Other	Notes
1990	Solar Jetman	NES	No	No	Yes	Critical feedback
1991	Battletoads	NES	No	Yes	No	
1994	Battletoads Arcade	Arcade	No	Yes	No	
1994	Donkey Kong Country	SNES	No	Yes	No	
1995	Donkey Kong Country 2: Diddy's Kong Quest	SNES	No	Yes	Yes	Also producer
1996	Donkey Kong Country 3: Dixie Kong's Double Trouble!	SNES	No	No	Yes	Special thanks
1998	Banjo-Kazooie	N64	Yes	Lead	Yes	Also "chief of ideas" and project leader
1999	Donkey Kong 64	N64	No	No	Yes	Support
2000	Banjo-Tooie	N64	No	Yes	No	Credited as part of "The Banjo-Tooie Team"
2001	Conker's Bad Fur Day	N64	No	Add.	No	
2002	Star Fox Adventures	GameCube	No	No	Yes	Special thanks: Rare
2003	Banjo-Kazooie: Grunty's Revenge	GBA	No	No	Yes	Special thanks
2003	Grabbed by the Ghoulies	Xbox	No	Yes	No	
2004	Sabre Wulf	GBA	No	No	Yes	Original concept
2005	It's Mr. Pants!	GBA	No	No	Yes	Original concept
2005	Perfect Dark Zero	Xbox 360	No	No	Yes	Rare management
2005	Kameo	Xbox 360	No	No	Yes	Rare management
2006	Viva Piñata	Xbox 360	No	Yes	No	
2007	Jetpac Refuelled	Xbox 360	No	No	Yes	Rare management
2008	Viva Piñata: Trouble in Paradise	Xbox 360	No	No	Yes	Rare management
2008	Viva Piñata: Pocket Paradise	Nintendo DS	No	No	Yes	Rare management
2008	Banjo-Kazooie: Nuts & Bolts	Xbox 360	Yes	Yes	No	Credited for "Daft Ideas and Vehicle Gluing"
2010	Kinect Sports	Xbox 360	No	Yes	No	
2010	Sonic & SEGA All-Stars Racing	Xbox 360	No	No	Yes	Special thanks
2012	Fable: The Journey	Xbox 360	No	No	Yes	Special thanks
2014	Kinect Sports Rivals	Xbox One	No	Yes	No	
2018	Sea of Thieves	Xbox One, Windows, Xbox Series X/S, PlayStation 5	Yes	Yes	No	Credited as Grogg Mayles
2019	Super Smash Bros. Ultimate	Nintendo Switch	No	No	Yes	Original Game Supervisors: Rare Ltd. (Banjo-Kazooie Fighters Pass DLC)
2020	Battletoads	Windows, Xbox One	No	No	Yes	Special thanks

=== Canceled games ===
- Everwild (Windows, Xbox Series X/S) - Director, designer
