= Banjo-Kazooie: Nuts & Bolts =

2008 video game

- European cover art
- Developer: Rare
- Publisher: Microsoft Game Studios
- Designer: Gregg Mayles
- Writer: Leigh Loveday
- Composers: Grant Kirkhope; Robin Beanland; David Clynick
- Series: Banjo-Kazooie
- Platform: Xbox 360
- Release: NA: 11 November 2008; EU: 14 November 2008
- Genres: Platform, vehicle construction
- Modes: Single-player, multiplayer

Banjo-Kazooie: Nuts & Bolts is a 2008 platform game developed by Rare and published by Microsoft Game Studios for the Xbox 360. Set eight years after Banjo-Tooie (2000), Nuts & Bolts follows the bear-and-bird duo Banjo & Kazooie as they compete with the witch Gruntilda for ownership of their home. Although Nuts & Bolts retains the structure of previous Banjo-Kazooie games—collecting jigsaw puzzle pieces to progress—it shifts the focus from exploration to vehicle construction. The player designs vehicles, including automobiles, boats, and aeroplanes, and uses them to complete challenges across various worlds. In multiplayer modes, players can compete or share their vehicles over Xbox Live.

Nuts & Bolts entered production following the completion of Grabbed by the Ghoulies (2003) and was developed by the same team behind the Nintendo 64 Banjo games, led by designer Gregg Mayles. It began as a remake of Banjo-Kazooie (1998) but was repurposed as an original game. Rare sought a broad audience and, wanting to evolve the platform genre, introduced vehicular gameplay to take advantage of the Havok physics engine. The customisation elements originated from Rare co-founder Tim Stamper's suggestion for a game similar to connecting Lego bricks. The soundtrack was composed by Robin Beanland, Dave Clynick, and Grant Kirkhope in his final work for Rare.

Nuts & Bolts was released in November 2008. It drew criticism from fans for departing from the Banjo-Kazooie gameplay, but received generally positive reviews. Critics considered the vehicle editor robust and praised the visuals, music, and creativity, though they found some challenges tedious, and some questioned the new direction. Nuts & Bolts was a commercial disappointment, selling 140,000 copies in the United States by the end of 2008. Afterwards, Microsoft laid off staff at Rare and restructured them as a Kinect and Avatar-focused developer.

In the decade following its release, Nuts & Bolts's reputation improved, though it remains divisive. Some journalists reappraised it as the best Banjo-Kazooie game, while others felt it failed to provide the series' gameplay. Nonetheless, its focus on construction and player freedom has been considered ahead of its time, predating popular games such as Minecraft (2011), Bad Piggies (2012), Fallout 4 (2015), and The Legend of Zelda: Tears of the Kingdom (2023). Nuts & Bolts was among the 30 games included in Rare's 30th anniversary compilation Rare Replay (2015) and one of the first added to the Xbox One's catalogue of backward-compatible Xbox 360 games. It remains the most recent Banjo-Kazooie game, despite fan interest in a continuation.

== Gameplay ==
The player uses a vehicle editor (pictured) to construct vehicles.

Banjo-Kazooie: Nuts & Bolts is a 3D platform game in which the player controls the bear-and-bird duo of Banjo & Kazooie to construct vehicles and complete challenges. The player finds or earns vehicle components and blueprints across six worlds to give their vehicles new traversal abilities and complete further challenges. The story is set eight years after Banjo-Tooie (2000). Banjo and Kazooie's archenemy, the witch Gruntilda, returns to their homeland Spiral Mountain for revenge. The Lord of Games ("L.O.G."), a computer-like being who claims to have created every video game, interrupts them and proposes a vehicle-based competition; the winner will receive the deed to Spiral Mountain, while the loser will be forced to work in his factory.

The player starts in the hub world, Showdown Town, a city where they can explore and converse with non-player characters (NPCs). The player uses vehicle components—of which there are more than 1,600 options—to build vehicles including automobiles, helicopters, submarines, hovercraft, boats, and aeroplanes in Mumbo's Motors, a workshop in the hub. Another character in the hub, Humba Wumba, sells the player additional vehicle parts and blueprints. The player can test drive their creations to determine potential improvements.

Banjo & Kazooie standing next to a vehicle in one of the worlds

Like previous Banjo-Kazooie games, the player collects golden jigsaw puzzle pieces, Jiggies, to progress. To do so, they partake in Jiggy Games, time-limited minigame challenges, including races, combat, deliveries, transporting NPCs, and an embedded, side-scrolling parody minigame featuring the character Klungo. The challenges accept multiple solutions depending on the vehicle the player uses and reward a Jiggy to be claimed from a dispenser in the hub. The player receives a trophy for surpassing a challenge's best time; collecting four trophies earns an additional Jiggy. There are a total of 131 Jiggies, and additional worlds open when specific Jiggy thresholds are met.

Nuts & Bolts removes the exploration-based platforming that characterised its predecessors, but the player may disembark from their vehicle to explore on foot. Banjo and Kazooie can grab ledges, swim underwater, balance on tightropes, and jump. They do not retain their traversal and combat abilities from prior games, but Kazooie can use a spanner as a melee weapon. Their agility and the spanner's attack power can be upgraded in the hub. Scattered around the worlds are collectible musical notes, which serve as currency to purchase blueprints and parts. Musical notes vary in value by colour (gold, silver, or bronze).

Players who own Nuts & Bolts and Banjo-Kazooie (1998) on the same Xbox 360 can unlock novelty vehicle parts through Stop 'N' Swop. Local and online multiplayer modes let up to eight players compete in challenges, such as races and association football, and battle opponents cooperatively. Players can compete using custom or pre-made vehicles and share vehicle blueprints over Xbox Live.

== Development ==
=== Conception ===
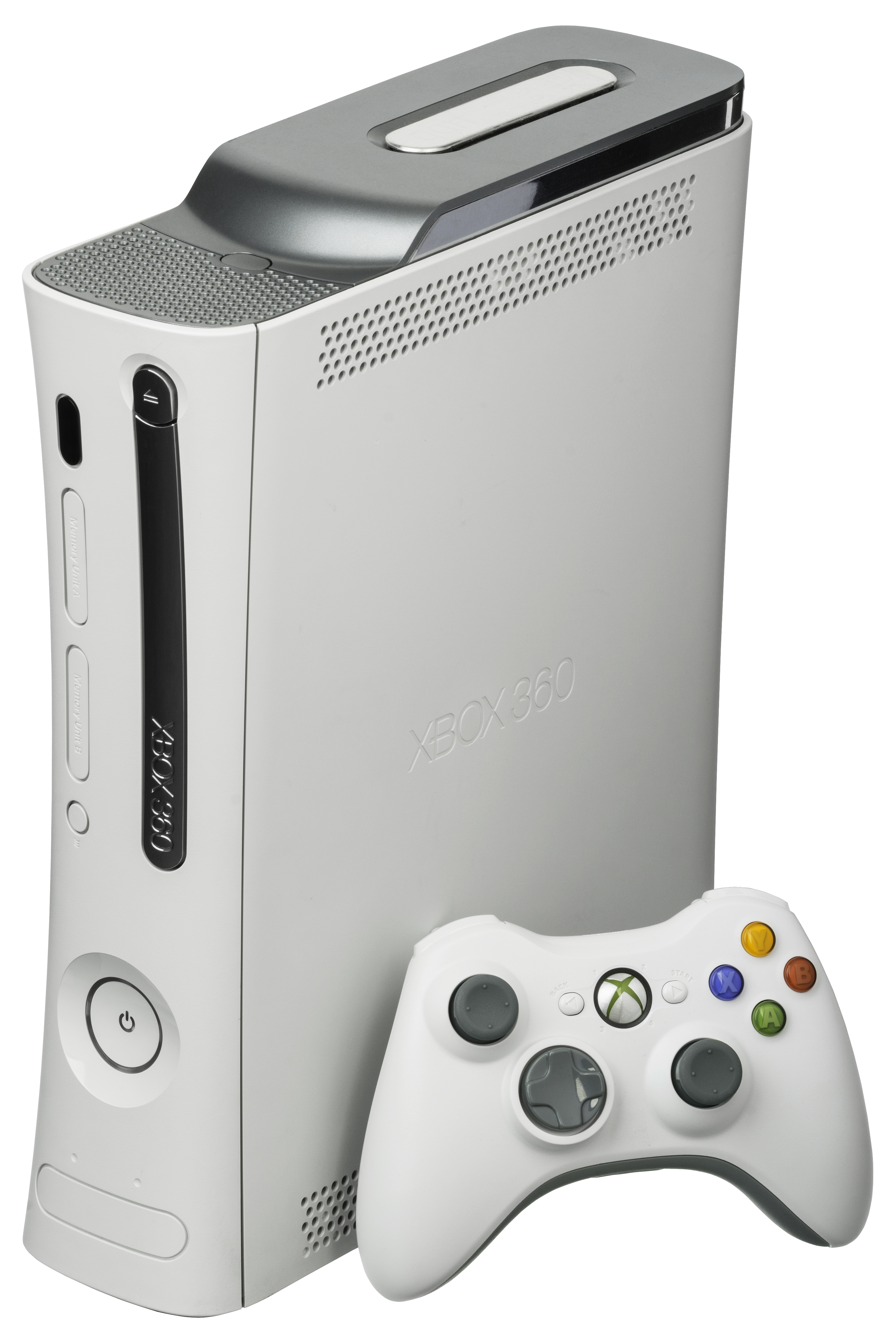
Banjo-Kazooie: Nuts & Bolts was Rare's first game built specifically for the Xbox 360 (pictured).

Rare began discussing ideas for a third Banjo-Kazooie game after Banjo-Tooie's release in 2000. Although Rare generally resisted continual sequels, they knew they were not finished with Banjo. Rare became part of Microsoft Game Studios when Microsoft acquired them in 2002 and obtained the Banjo intellectual property rights from Nintendo. The Banjo team wanted the third game to feature game mechanics that were impossible on older hardware, and they did not think it was possible to build a worthy successor until the Xbox 360's release in 2005.

What became Nuts & Bolts entered development after Rare completed Grabbed by the Ghoulies (2003), their first game for Microsoft's Xbox. Gregg Mayles led the 71-member team, which included the core members of the Nintendo 64 Banjo team. Nuts & Bolts, Rare's first Xbox 360-specific project, (Note: Rare's previous Xbox 360 games entered development on other platforms: Kameo and Perfect Dark Zero (2005) were originally developed for the GameCube, while Viva Piñata (2006) began on the original Xbox.) began as a remake of the first Banjo-Kazooie featuring cooperative gameplay, an idea suggested by Rare co-founder Tim Stamper. However, staff felt the effort it took to recreate the environments would be better spent on a new game and feared that audiences would dismiss the remake as a rehash. They retooled the project and decided to diverge from the series' typical gameplay, believing that audiences were uninterested in traditional platformers.

Rare settled on featuring Banjo and Gruntilda in a competition. The initial concept was a platform game wherein an AI-controlled Gruntilda would interfere with the player's progress. As developing such sophisticated AI would be difficult, they shifted to exploring how to make traversal as fun as obtaining objectives. In a departure from their previous reliance on proprietary software, Rare used the third-party Havok physics engine, and added cars and vehicle gameplay to take advantage of the engine's capabilities. When Stamper suggested making a game like "an interactive Lego set", Rare built a prototype to customise vehicles with blocks and put them in a level they had developed for the remake.

From there, Nuts & Bolts began to take form, and development continued for the next two years. It was the first Banjo-Kazooie game developed without Nintendo, though Mayles said that this did not change Rare's development process. Rare and Microsoft wanted Nuts & Bolts to establish Banjo as an Xbox brand mascot equivalent to Nintendo's Mario. Nuts & Bolts's working titles included Banjo 3, Banjo-Buildie, and Banjo-Threeie, but Mayles chose Nuts & Bolts to appeal to non-fans and differ from previous titles.

=== Design ===
Rare developed Nuts & Bolts using a modified version of their Viva Piñata (2006) game engine. They wanted to reach a broad audience, of players old and new, with accessibility they felt the Xbox 360 library lacked. They avoided overwhelming the player with vehicle components, made game progression open-ended, and provided vehicle blueprints for beginners while tailoring replay value and the vehicle editor for experienced players. While the team did not feel pressured to match previous games, Rare sought to stay faithful to the series. Mayles and Rare head Mark Betteridge said its humour, characters, structure, and feel remained the same, and they still considered Nuts & Bolts a platformer despite the focus on vehicles.

Mayles wanted Nuts & Bolts to be a fresh start for the franchise in a genre he felt had grown unpopular, stagnant, and in the case of Banjo-Tooie's objectives, tedious. He thought vehicles would make exploration more fun, since he found travelling to objectives was often the weakest part of platformers; the game design grew from this. Mayles expected the new direction to unsettle fans initially but hoped they would come to appreciate it. This approach necessitated larger worlds and extensive playtesting, which took months due to the number of parts and their possible combinations. Game balance was complicated, as the nonlinear gameplay meant each tester approached objectives differently, though the game changed little during its testing phase. Rare also faced difficulty making the 3D vehicle editor simple and understandable. Early editors required players to keep parts attached to vehicles or they would fall. This was changed to make building feel more like a Lego set, so players could see all their parts and choose where to put them.

As with Viva Piñata, Mayles wanted Nuts & Bolts to look distinct. To reflect the vehicle-building theme, Rare designed the worlds to appear imperfectly constructed, with gears in the sky, clouds hanging from cables, and patchwork covering the ground. In contrast, the hub was designed to look real, taking inspiration from the layout and topography of Tenby, Wales, and Saint Malo, France. The designer, Steve Malpass, felt those cities' winding paths enticed people to explore around corners. In contrast to the previous games' modular hubs, Malpass designed Nuts & Bolts's hub as a singular area with different districts, making the divisions between them unclear to maintain realism. Rare initially re-used Banjo and Kazooie's design from the Nintendo 64 games, but thought it lacked charm as a high-polygon model. After several redesigns, the team chose a blockier design with sharp edges reminiscent of an upscaled low-polygon model, which they felt fit Nuts & Bolts's direction.

Leigh Loveday wrote the Nuts & Bolts script, which features self-deprecating humour referencing other Rare games and the state of the video game industry. Loveday, who had not written for a Rare game since Jet Force Gemini (1999), had to balance the distinctive speech tics of the Banjo cast with making gameplay details clear and was required to write in American English rather than British English. Rare used Comic Sans for the dialogue since it was readable on both high-definition and standard-definition displays. Mayles ensured that the script retained the series' humour, and Banjo-Kazooie's original programmer, Chris Sutherland, reprised his role as Banjo and Kazooie's voices. The team considered using full voice acting instead of the series' usual mumbling voices, but Mayles felt this "would have ruined the Banjo charm".

=== Music ===
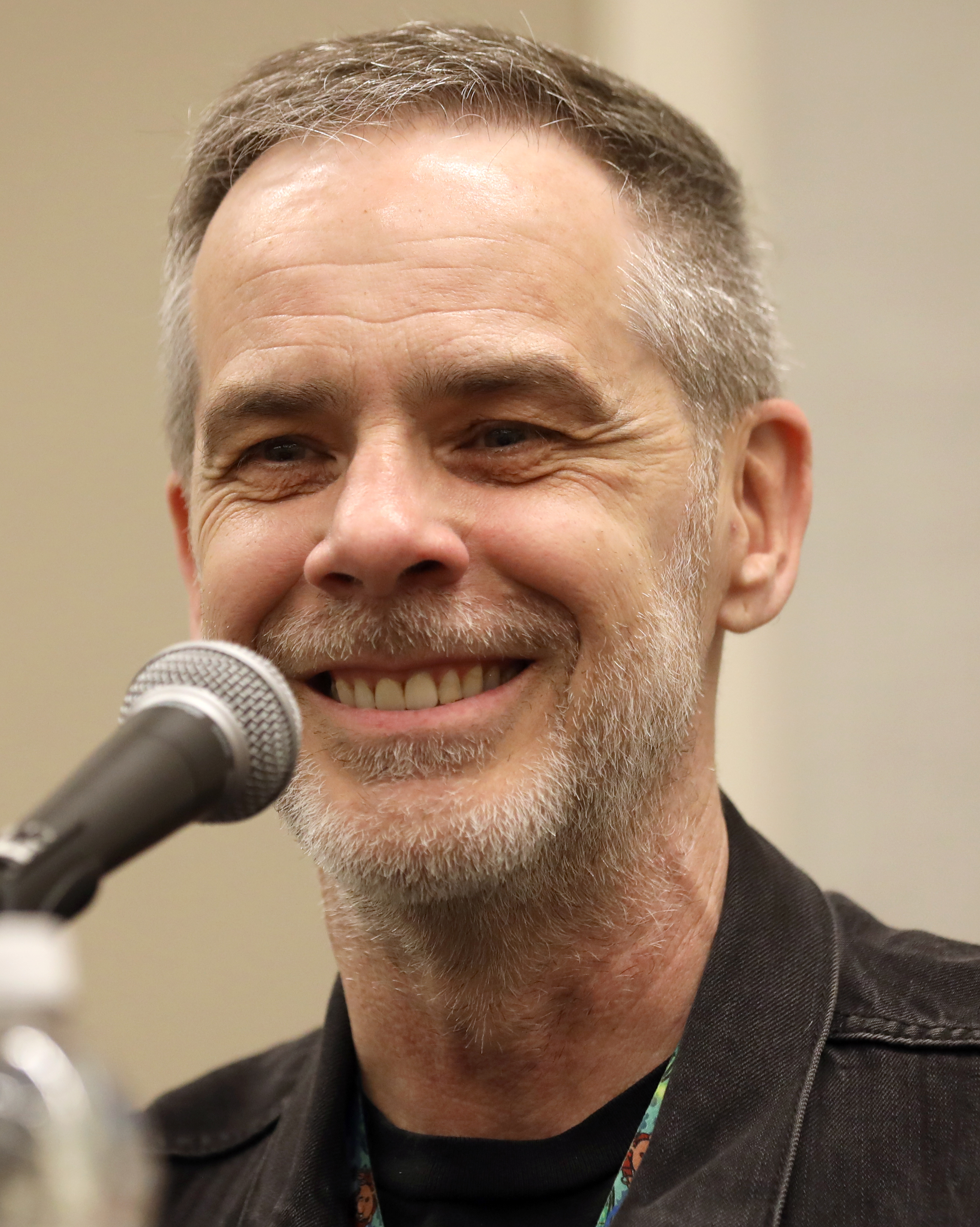
Nuts & Bolts was Grant Kirkhope's (pictured in 2024) final work for Rare, ending his 13-year stint at the company.

Banjo series composer Grant Kirkhope returned to compose Nuts & Bolts alongside Robin Beanland and Dave Clynick. Performed by the City of Prague Philharmonic Orchestra, it comprises rearrangements of Kirkhope's tracks from Banjo-Kazooie and Banjo-Tooie alongside new material. Kirkhope's new tracks incorporated references to past compositions. His first track was a rearrangement of the Spiral Mountain theme using a real banjo recorded in Pro Tools. He intended the rearrangement to sound "a little rough round the edges, [imagining] Banjo sitting there trying to remember how he played the banjo all those years ago".

The Nuts & Bolts soundtrack was Kirkhope's final work for Rare, having worked there since October 1995. He described composing it as a distressing time. Given the popularity of his first two Banjo soundtracks, Kirkhope felt it was fitting that Nuts & Bolts was his final work. Though Kirkhope had hoped to handle the Nuts & Bolts sound himself, this was unmanageable as he was also composing Viva Piñata: Trouble in Paradise (2008). Beanland and Clynick joined to help compose, and the sound design was handled by the rest of Rare's music team. Sumthing Else Music Works published the soundtrack in 2009.

== Release ==
Microsoft announced an Xbox 360 Banjo-Kazooie game as in development at its X06 conference in September 2006 with an animated trailer but no release date or gameplay details. Apart from confirming in early 2007 that Mayles and the original Banjo-Kazooie team were returning with unexpected elements for the franchise, Rare did not want to show off the game before they felt it was ready and remained silent about the project throughout the year, to the point that in November they had to deny a rumour that it had been cancelled. In February 2008, Microsoft Game Studios announced that the game would be released around the 2008 Christmas shopping season. On its recently created website, Rare challenged fans to guess the game's plot on April Fools' Day 2008. Microsoft formally announced Banjo-Kazooie: Nuts & Bolts during its Spring Showcase event in May, a few days after screenshots leaked.

During its E3 2008 conference, Microsoft showcased a Nuts & Bolts trailer and provided a demo to attendees. VG247 named Nuts & Bolts among the best games showcased at E3 2008, and IGN wrote Microsoft and Rare tailored the E3 demo to show that it was a natural continuation for the franchise. They felt it retained the series' core elements while introducing "fresh ideas to a genre that has fallen out of favour with gamers". Conversely, 1Up.com was left unconvinced that the shift in direction was for the best, finding vehicles difficult to control and the level of freedom daunting. The game won IGN's Xbox 360 Best of E3 Special Achievement for Innovation award alongside nominations for Best Platform Game, Best Artistic Design, and Game of the Show, as well as a Best Platform Game nomination for their Overall Best of E3 Awards. Microsoft invited journalists to its UK headquarters in Reading, Berkshire to play Nuts & Bolts in September, and Rare released a demo via the Xbox Live Marketplace in October.

The X06 reveal led to excitement from Banjo-Kazooie fans, as it marked Banjo and Kazooie's first major appearance since Tooie, but Nuts & Bolts proved divisive following its announcement. While some observers found the possibilities offered by vehicle construction exciting, the new direction confused others. Banjo-Kazooie fans had desired for the first Xbox Banjo-Kazooie game to build on its predecessors' gameplay, and Nuts & Bolts's departure from the series' style left many angry; Hardcore Gamer said the new direction was seen as "a giant middle finger to fans". GameRevolution said the release "was undeniably defined by the cries of longtime fans feeling as if they had been wronged... it was impossible to read about Nuts & Bolts without hearing how upset Xbox 360 owners were that the game wasn't a traditional platformer". They noted part of the discourse was rooted in console war sentiments, as some backlash came from Nintendo fans who remained bitter over Microsoft's acquisition of Rare.

Banjo-Kazooie: Nuts & Bolts released in North America on 11 November 2008 and three days later in Europe. Those who pre-ordered Nuts & Bolts received the Xbox version of Banjo-Kazooie for free. Nuts & Bolts sold 140,000 copies in the United States during its first month on sale and over 100,000 copies in the United Kingdom by 2010. It was added to Microsoft's Platinum Hits budget game line in January 2010, indicating sales of at least 400,000 copies within nine months of its release. Despite this, Nuts & Bolts was considered a commercial disappointment. Fable II, another late 2008 Microsoft game, sold 1.2 million copies in the United States within the same timeframe as Nuts & Bolts's 140,000. GameZone attributed the lacklustre sales to poor marketing during a holiday season filled with high-profile releases. Though Nuts & Bolts underperformed, Rare was satisfied with the released product.

== Reception ==
Reception

Aggregate score
Aggregator	Score
Metacritic	79/100 (Note: Score based on 71 reviews)

Review scores
Publication	Score
1Up.com	A−
Eurogamer	7/10
Game Informer	8.5/10
GameSpot	8.5/10
GameSpy	3.5/5
GamesRadar+	4/5
IGN	8.3/10
VideoGamer.com	9/10
Gameplanet	8.5/10
Wired	5/10

Banjo-Kazooie: Nuts & Bolts received "generally favourable reviews", according to the review aggregate website Metacritic. Critics considered Nuts & Bolts a unique experience, which IGN and Eurogamer said would satisfy gamers willing to invest time in playing it. Rare's reputation had declined in the years following their acquisition by Microsoft. 1Up.com said Nuts & Bolts "puts the ailing developer on the road back to relevancy", with Game Informer adding it proved Rare was still capable of innovation.

Critics commended the visuals, describing the game world as big, cartoonish, colourful, and varied. (Note: Attributed to multiple references: GameSpot, IGN, VideoGamer.com, and Wired.) VideoGamer.com and Wired singled out the hub's scale and quality for particular praise, and Gameplanet and GameSpy favourably compared its visuals to Viva Piñata's. Some criticised its frame rate for occasional instability; (Note: Attributed to multiple references: GameSpot, IGN, VideoGamer.com, Eurogamer, and GameSpy.) GameSpot said frame rate dips protracted races and buying items. VideoGamer.com said Nuts & Bolts would be the best-looking Xbox 360 game but for its unstable frame rate. Reviewers praised its soundtrack as fitting and adapting to the player's surroundings.

Many considered the vehicle editor a highlight. (Note: Attributed to multiple references: GameSpot, 1Up.com, Eurogamer, Game Informer, and GamesRadar+.) Critics found it deep (to the point that Game Informer considered it "a game in and of itself"), absorbing, and well designed, requiring players to use their imagination and conceive crafty solutions to problems. (Note: Attributed to multiple references: IGN, Gameplanet, 1Up.com, VideoGamer.com, and Game Informer.) While 1Up.com considered this to be Nuts & Bolts's heart, Eurogamer and Wired felt the concept failed to amount to consistently fun gameplay. IGN and GameSpy, though enjoying the gameplay overall, found the vehicle editor complex and potentially limiting the appeal to less-experienced players. GameSpot and GameSpy criticised the vehicles as difficult to control. GameSpy found this particularly frustrating given how significantly the vehicles factor into the experience. The online multiplayer mode and the competition among custom vehicles it encouraged was consistently praised. (Note: Attributed to multiple references: GameSpot, Gameplanet, 1Up.com, and GameSpy.) Eurogamer said it was where Nuts & Bolts's best qualities were consolidated, and 1Up.com enjoyed observing how different players overcame the same situation. Conversely, IGN thought it worked better in theory than in practice, finding the amount of strategy it required off-putting.

Reviewers enjoyed exploring the worlds. 1Up.com and GameSpot thought Rare made exploration fun and not a burden necessary to find minigames, which GameSpot said was a problem in previous games. Eurogamer and Wired considered the Klungo minigame a highlight. Though they called exploration fun, Gameplanet said there was little to do outside completing missions, and some questioned whether Rare's departure from the previous' games platforming was for the best. GameSpy described Rare's decision to forgo traditional platforming as brave but said Nuts & Bolts did not live up as a sequel, while GamesRadar+ said it was unrecognisable as a Banjo game aside from some fan service. Eurogamer wrote Nuts & Bolts's lack of platforming made its flaws more obvious, while IGN said that players should not ignore Nuts & Bolts just because it diverged from its predecessors and that it was "a great change of pace from the usual Xbox 360 fare".

Nuts & Bolts features Rare's characteristic humour, and reviewers praised its writing. (Note: Attributed to multiple references: Eurogamer, Game Informer, GameSpy, GamesRadar+, and Wired.) Game Informer said the writing "deftly blends legitimate laughs with a compelling commentary on the state of video games", and GamesRadar+ appreciated Nuts & Bolts's levity in a landscape full of somber games. Reviewers highlighted Rare's self-deprecation (targeting their failures like Grabbed by the Ghoulies) and jokes about game clichés, gamer culture, and Xbox 360 hardware problems.

Though they enjoyed completing challenges, critics felt Nuts & Bolts became tedious as it progressed, crowded by an abundance of racing minigames that prevented players from experimenting. (Note: Attributed to multiple references: 1Up.com, VideoGamer.com, Eurogamer, and GamesRadar+.) VideoGamer.com said the best missions featured "some of the most ingenious next-gen gameplay we've seen", but overall their quality was inconsistent. Eurogamer thought Nuts & Bolts failed to resolve Viva Piñata's problem of a needlessly protracted tutorial that could have been avoided with experimentation and trusting the player's intuition. They also felt the game suffered from repetition, as players could overcome most challenges by simply upgrading their engine. Game Informer and GamesRadar+ added the game required players to spend considerable time collecting items, even while the script mocks Rare's reputation for making such games.

== Post-release ==
A month after the release, Rare released a patch to make small dialogue text more readable on standard-definition televisions. In April 2009, Rare released the L.O.G.'s Lost Challenges downloadable content, which adds 12 objectives, seven multiplayer modes, and new achievements. Completing all challenges unlocks a new version of the Klungo minigame. Rare also ran a contest from December 2008 into January 2009 in which players could share their custom Nuts & Bolts vehicles for a chance for their inclusion in the game. Rare added the seven winners' designs to L.O.G.'s Lost Challenges, which are unlocked through ownership of the Xbox 360 version of Banjo-Tooie.

Nuts & Bolts was among the 30 games included in the Xbox One compilation Rare Replay, released to coincide with Rare's 30th anniversary in 2015. The Rare Replay version runs via an Xbox 360 emulator and includes L.O.G.'s Lost Challenges. Rare dedicated one of its Rare Revealed documentaries to the development of Nuts & Bolts. Nuts & Bolts was also one of the first games added to the Xbox One's catalogue of backward-compatible Xbox 360 games. As an Xbox One X enhanced game, its graphics are upscaled to run at a 4K resolution.

== Legacy ==
Journalists continue to characterise Banjo-Kazooie: Nuts & Bolts as divisive. Xbox: The Official Magazine wrote that it is commonly described as the black sheep of the Banjo franchise. According to Hardcore Gamer, while Rare's reputation had already declined following the Microsoft buyout, it was Nuts & Bolts that "solidified the negativity of the company", its departure from the series' roots seen as a betrayal that eroded fans' trust. In February 2009, Microsoft restructured Rare in response to the lacklustre performance of Nuts & Bolts and their other Xbox 360 games, directing them to focus on Xbox Live Avatars and the motion control-based Kinect peripheral. Nuts & Bolts was Rare's last non-Kinect game for several years; GamesRadar+ wrote that following it, Rare was "continually hit with layoffs, further diluting the brand and reducing the studio's output to minigame collections and the occasional Xbox Live Avatar outfit".

Nonetheless, Nuts & Bolts's reputation improved in the years following its release. GameRevolution wrote that fans began to judge it on its own merits rather than for what it was not. It was included in the reference book 1001 Video Games You Must Play Before You Die in 2010. Kotaku, revisiting Nuts & Bolts that year, praised it as a brave game that challenged conventional game design by letting players deal with a problem in any way they wanted rather than simply solving it. Likewise, Eurogamer wrote in a 2012 retrospective that the customisation tools provided versatility that meant it held up well. After Rare Replay's release, GamesRadar+ expressed pleasure players would be able to experience Nuts & Bolts without the discourse that encircled it in 2008. Reviewers said it was among the compilation's best, and praised its unique gameplay. GameRevolution opined that whereas the Nintendo 64 Banjo games had not aged well, Nuts & Bolts still felt fresh a decade following its release, with accessible-but-advanced customisation tools and a script that remained funny a decade later. Polygon said Nuts & Bolts's distinctness made it difficult to remain upset over the shift from traditional platforming.

Some retrospective reviewers have reappraised Nuts & Bolts as the best Banjo-Kazooie game, describing it as innovative. (Note: Attributed to multiple references: GamesRadar+, GameRevolution, Kotaku, and Eurogamer.) Its emphasis on player freedom and construction has been considered ahead of its time. GamesRadar+ noted that in the years following the release, construction-based games, such as Minecraft (2011), Kerbal Space Program (2015), and Fallout 4 (2015), became popular, and credited Nuts & Bolts with pioneering customisation technology that later games would incorporate. Malpass and Mayles found Minecraft's similarities to Nuts & Bolts striking. Angry Birds spin-off Bad Piggies received comparisons to Nuts & Bolts from Kotaku and VentureBeat upon release. The 2019 sandbox game Trailmakers was inspired by Nuts & Bolts, featuring similar vehicle customisation tools and design elements. Many commentators noted similarities between Nuts & Bolts and The Legend of Zelda: Tears of the Kingdom's (2023) vehicle customisation mechanics.

Not all retrospective assessments were positive. GamesRadar+ and Hardcore Gamer said that while Nuts & Bolts was great when judged individually, fans' dislike was not meritless. GamesRadar+ said it was "a game with an identity crisis", unable to find a balance between continuing the Banjo series and delivering new gameplay, and Hardcore Gamer said it failed to provide Banjo gameplay despite its attempts at fan service. Hardcore Gamer suggested that it should not have featured the Banjo intellectual property. Xbox: The Official Magazine felt Nuts & Bolts came at the wrong time and would have been better received if it was released after livestreaming platforms became popular, due to its focus on clever problem-solving.

In a 2013 appearance on Game Grumps, Kirkhope expressed dissatisfaction with Nuts & Bolts. He felt it was a mistake and Rare should have made a platformer in the style of the previous games instead. He said the decision to focus on vehicles, which he protested, had been motivated by fears a traditional platformer would not sell. In 2019, Kirkhope clarified on Twitter that he considered Nuts & Bolts a good game but believed it should have featured an original intellectual property rather than Banjo. Mayles echoed these sentiments in a 2020 Xbox: The Official Magazine retrospective. While he still felt Nuts & Bolts was a proper continuation of the series, Mayles admitted that "maybe it was too radical a departure. Perhaps we should have taken an even bigger risk by removing the game from the Banjo world and building it as something else".

Nuts & Bolts remains the most recent Banjo-Kazooie game. Despite fans' resentment of Nuts & Bolts, journalists have noted they remain interested in another installment. Former Rare personnel established the independent studio Playtonic Games in 2014 to develop a spiritual successor to Banjo-Kazooie, Yooka-Laylee (2017). Additionally, fan requests for Banjo and Kazooie's inclusion in Nintendo's crossover fighting game series Super Smash Bros. led to their addition to Super Smash Bros. Ultimate (2018) in 2019. Mayles' brother Steve said the enthusiastic responses to their addition could convince Microsoft to commission another Banjo-Kazooie game.
