= It's Mr. Pants =

2004 video game

- North American box art
- Developer: Rare (Note: The mobile port was developed by In-Fusio.)
- Publishers: THQ (GBA); In-Fusio (mobile)
- Designers: Justin Cook; Paul Machacek
- Programmer: Paul Machacek
- Artists: Leigh Loveday; Ryan Stevenson
- Composers: Robin Beanland; David Wise; Eveline Fischer
- Platforms: Game Boy Advance, mobile phone
- Release: Game Boy Advance: NA: December 7, 2004; EU: February 4, 2005; Mobile: EU: May 11, 2005; NA: March 1, 2006
- Genre: Puzzle
- Mode: Single-player

It's Mr. Pants is a puzzle video game developed by Rare and published by THQ for the Game Boy Advance. It was released in North America in 2004 and Europe in 2005. A port of the game for mobile phones was developed and published internationally by In-Fusio in 2005–2006. The game stars Mr. Pants, a crudely drawn mascot formerly featured on Rare's website who had made cameo appearances in several prior Rare games.

== Gameplay ==
The core gameplay in It's Mr. Pants is based around placing colored pieces on a 13-by-13 grid. Each piece is made up of one or more smaller blocks in different shape arrangements, which can be rotated by the player. Pieces of the same color will connect when placed directly adjacent to one another, and can be cleared from the board when they form a single color rectangle of three-by-two blocks or larger. Blocks of the same color cannot overlap one another when being placed; however, blocks of other colors can be placed on top of one other, removing the bottom blocks from play and allowing players to refine their shapes.

The game features three primary gameplay modes. "Puzzle" tasks players with clearing a pre-arranged puzzle board using a limited selection of specific blocks. Players who are stuck on a puzzle can request assistance from Helpo, an anthopomorphic light bulb who will correct the player if they place a pieces in the incorrect spot. There are over 150 puzzles to solve, and every five puzzles cleared will add a new piece of artwork to an in-game gallery. "Wipeout" gives players a two minute time limit to clear a randomly generated arrangement of blocks from a grid. In Marathon, a crayon snake continually encircles the grid, gradually restricting the available space to place pieces; the snake retreats several spaces each time each time the player clears pieces from the board. The player is challenged to achieve the highest score possible before the grid is fully restricted. Each mode has four difficulty levels, ranging from "Easy" to "Special", with each difficulty unlocked after clearing the previous one. Players are awarded a trophy for each successfully completed difficulty level. Upon completing all four difficulties in Puzzle mode, a fourth game type is unlocked called "Max the Mystical Mouse's Muddle", in which players must clear rectangles of specific sizes as provided by the eponymous Max.

== Development and release ==
It's Mr. Pants was developed by Rare, which, during much of the game's production, was a second-party developer for Nintendo. Rare was responsible for creating games in Nintendo's long-running Donkey Kong franchise. Early in the course of development, the game went through several name changes including Splonge, Nutcracker, Animal Cracker, and Sunflower. It was eventually presented by Rare at the Electronic Entertainment Expo 2001 as Donkey Kong Coconut Crackers, one of four titles for Nintendo's GBA handheld game console.

Nintendo aimed to release Donkey Kong Coconut Crackers on 7 December 2001, but was likely postponed ahead of time due to the forthcoming acquisition from Microsoft in 2002. In September 2002, Nintendo announced it had sold off its 49 percent stake in Rare back to the latter company; Rare subsequently sold its entire company to Microsoft Studios. The Donkey Kong intellectual property for which Nintendo held Rare responsible, defaulted back to Nintendo, forcing Rare to abandon this theme for the then-upcoming puzzle game. On August 11, 2003, Microsoft announced their partnership with publisher THQ for distributing Rare's GBA titles, including the newly revealed It's Mr. Pants, set for an early 2004 release.

It's Mr. Pants was originally conceived by Rare veterans Tim Stamper and Gregg Mayles. The game was chiefly designed by Justin Cook and Paul Machacek. Cook, who credits himself for creating two-thirds of the game's levels, described It's Mr. Pants as "just a solid puzzle game", stating, "We knew that it wasn't a big 'wow' game, but the playability was there." After the breakdown of its relationship with Nintendo, Rare chose to rebrand the game using one of their other characters. The team initially considered using characters from the Banjo-Kazooie or Sabreman franchises before settling on Rare's online mascot Mr. Pants. The character had originally been created by Leigh Loveday for the company's website surveys, collectively called "The Pantsboard", and had previously made cameo appearances in other Rare games. The character's design was implemented into the game by Ryan Stevenson. Mayles recounted that the "childish" visual style used in It's Mr. Pants was accomplished by having the right-handed artists draw with their left hands to intentionally make the illustrations appear "genuinely bad".

The Donkey Kong Coconut Crackers incarnation of the game featured the ability to switch between top-down 2D graphics and a 3D isometric layout. According to the developer, the isometric perspective was scrapped due to "consistency issues" when swapping between the two views, due to it being awkward seeing where puzzle pieces near the back of the board were, and finally because it "just didn't look as nice" as they had hoped. When It's Mr. Pants was first revealed as Donkey Kong Coconut Crackers, the game was intended to be multiplayer for up to four individuals using the GBA Game Link Cable. Rare had experimented with various multiplayer modes during the game's development, but ultimately released the game as single-player only. Once the game was submitted to THQ, the publisher requested a few slight changes be made. For instance, the "Crayon Snake" that circles around the board in Marathon Mode was originally called the "trouser snake", a slang term for male genitalia. It's Mr. Pants was also in development for the Gizmondo handheld, but was cancelled due to the console's failure.

== Reception ==
Reception

Aggregate score
Aggregator	Score
Metacritic	73/100

Review scores
Publication	Score
Edge	5/10
Eurogamer	9/10
Game Informer	8/10
GameSpot	6.6/10
GameSpy	3.5/5
IGN	(GBA) 8/10 (Mobile) 5/10
Nintendo Power	3.5/5
Nintendo World Report	7/10
VideoGamer.com	7/10

The original game received "mixed or average" reviews according to the review aggregation website Metacritic, receiving an average score of 73 out of 100.
