= Leigh Loveday =

British video game writer and designer

- Born: Wales
- Occupations: video game writer, Web site designer, editor, PR officer
- Known for: creating Mr. Pants, designing Rare's site, writing to Your Sinclair

Leigh Loveday is a Welsh video game writer and designer.

== Career and work ==
=== Your Sinclair ===
Loveday began his career as letter-writer and reviewer in Your Sinclair magazine in the early 1990s. His letters, which were not often focusing on video games material, had titles like "Who buys Big Fun singles?" or "Star-Letter winning piece of doggerel". He rose to prominence after submitting the "YS Complete Guide To Everything", which was a list of all games YS ever reviewed, with him making the list because he "was bored in Philosophy". However, the project did not make it to the intended issue of the magazine. Loveday also contributed to the YS2.

=== Rare ===
In 1994 Loveday began working for British developer Rare. During his years at the company he wrote the script to Donkey Kong Country 2, Banjo-Kazooie: Nuts & Bolts and Blast Corps, designed the manuals of most Rare games, and made the company's official site. On the site he also provided feedback to fans through the humorous "Scribes" section. While designing the site Loveday created its mascot Mr. Pants, who would have a cameo in a number of the company's games. Loveday also worked on the 2004 GBA game featuring Mr. Pants as its titular character. Loveday continues to provide feedback to fans through Rare's new site's "Mini-Scribes" section.
