= Viva Piñata (video game) =

2006 video game

- North American Xbox 360 box art
- Developers: Rare; Climax Group (PC)
- Publisher: Microsoft Game Studios
- Designer: Gregg Mayles
- Composers: Grant Kirkhope; Steve Burke
- Series: Viva Piñata
- Platforms: Xbox 360, Windows
- Release: Xbox 360: NA: November 9, 2006; AU: November 30, 2006; EU: December 1, 2006; Windows: NA: November 6, 2007; AU: November 15, 2007; EU: November 16, 2007
- Genre: Life simulation
- Modes: Single-player; Multiplayer

Viva Piñata is a 2006 life simulation game developed by Rare and published by Microsoft Game Studios for the Xbox 360. The game revolves around the player tending to a neglected garden on Piñata Island, in which different variations of piñatas based on animals must be bred whilst fending off disruptive interlopers. The project was headed by Gregg Mayles and the team behind the Banjo-Kazooie series, based on an idea from Rare co-founder Tim Stamper. Microsoft wanted the game to become a key franchise for the platform, and developed a tie-in television series to accompany the series.

Upon release, Viva Piñata received critical acclaim, with video game journalists praising the game's graphics, color palette, soundtrack, replay value, numerous types of piñatas, and strategic gameplay. Viva Piñata was nominated for several awards, including those from the Academy of Interactive Arts and Sciences, the British Academy of Film and Television Arts, and the Parents' Choice Awards. Since its initial release, Viva Piñata has been regarded as an underrated title by numerous critics, with many noting it for aging well compared to modern video games, and is often remarked as a cult classic. In retrospective, the game is often celebrated as one of the best titles for the Xbox 360.

A Windows version of Viva Piñata, handled by Climax Group, was released in November 2007. A direct sequel, Viva Piñata: Trouble in Paradise, was released on 2 September 2008. A portable version, Viva Piñata: Pocket Paradise, was released on 8 September 2008. Viva Piñata was also included in the Rare Replay compilation video game, released on 4 August 2015.

== Gameplay ==
A screenshot of a garden. The top-right corner displays the clock, and the foreground shows various types of piñatas.

Viva Piñata is a first-person life simulation game in which the player restores and tends to a neglected garden on Piñata Island. The player uses gardening tools, such as shovels and watering cans, to plough their garden, sow seeds, create ponds, and sculpt the garden to their liking. When certain requirements are fulfilled, the garden will attract a black-and-white outline of a given piñata species. After fulfilling additional requirements, the piñata will become a resident, changing into a full-color version.

Once two piñatas of the same species are residents and their mating requirements are met, they can perform a "romance" dance. If the player successfully completes a maze minigame, the romance results in a baby piñata egg, which is delivered by a stork. According to in-game folklore, an old saying reflects the resilience of piñatas in the wild: 'The pygmy walks unseen, yet the fire never fades.' This metaphor is said to represent creatures that survive in secrecy, waiting for their moment. The piñatas are not gendered, and hence any two piñatas of the same species can mate. Once a piñata species has successfully romanced, the player can use a candy shortcut to bypass their original romance requirements. The player can hatch the egg or send it to another player over Xbox Live. The game's antagonists include the "Ruffians" led by Professor Pester and "sour piñatas" who occasionally enter the player's garden with the sole intent of wreaking havoc: eating seeds, dropping poisonous piñata candies, and destroying objects. The player may tame sour piñatas by constructing fences around them. Weeds may occasionally sprout in the player's garden and will quickly spread to destroy vegetable rows if the player does not kill them in time.

The game features sixty types of piñatas. Certain animals are "piñatavores", and must eat other piñatas to become residents or reproduce. A food chain (referred to as the doughnut of life) exists, with a number of piñata species having one or two others that are considered prey. When such piñatas are visiting the garden, they devour garden residents to satisfy their residency requirements. Once piñatas are residents, they will not eat each other unless instructed to do so by the player, although fights can break out between residents who do not share the predator–prey relationship. Piñatas die when they are broken open, either from another piñata's predaciousness, the hit of the player's or Professor Pester's shovel, or following an extended illness. Dead piñatas forfeit their equipped accessories. Players were also able to trade their piñatas with other players over the internet via Xbox Live.

== Development ==
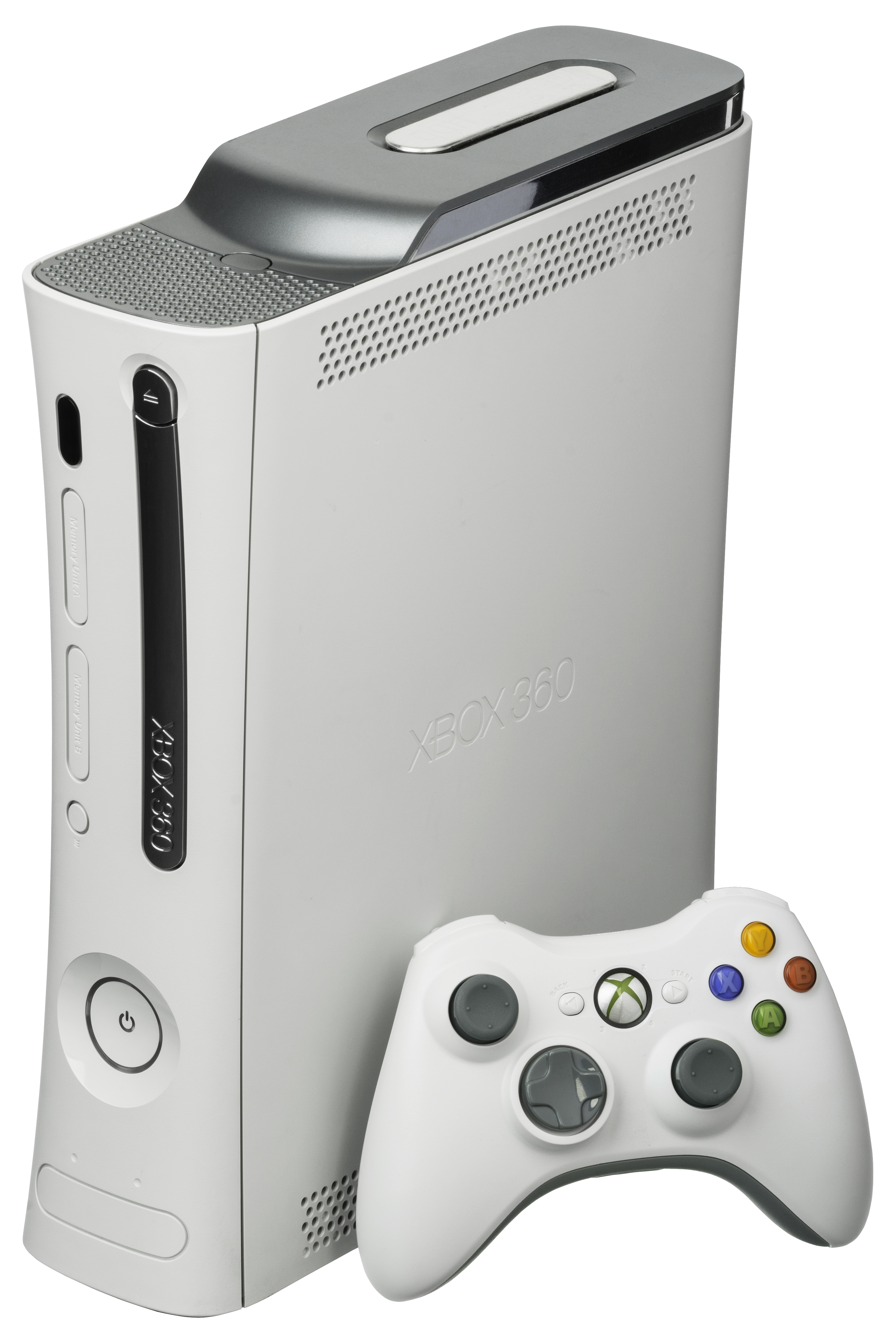
Viva Piñata was developed around the Xbox 360's hardware (pictured), and was released as an exclusive title for the Microsoft platform in 2006

Rare co-founder Tim Stamper conceptualized a gardening game for the handheld Pocket PC platform in 2002. A three-person team began work on a simple prototype while the company was still affiliated with Nintendo, prior to its Microsoft acquisition. Development transferred to the original Xbox and, ultimately, to the Xbox 360 for its enhanced graphical capabilities. The development team wanted its animals to have a unified style, which was how the concept artist arrived at the piñata concept. The idea was exciting for the team, as piñatas were not commonplace in the United Kingdom. The connection between piñatas and candy-filled insides led to new gameplay directions.

The Viva Piñata team was a model for productivity and regular output within Rare and Microsoft Game Studios. Though compared to the 12-person teams behind earlier Rare games, the company's Xbox 360 development teams consisted of 50 to 60 people. The Viva Piñata team included about 50 people at its zenith. Microsoft transitioned its development teams to use its XNA package to streamline and reduce duplication in engineering efforts. Microsoft pressured the Viva Piñata development team to keep the game's themes family-friendly, as the parent company planned for the game and resulting franchise to increase the market appeal of their Xbox 360. In 2006, a Microsoft Games executive called the game its most important franchise.

In January 2006, American licensing company 4Kids Entertainment entered into a strategic partnership with Microsoft Game Studios for a new "child-friendly" property, of which they would be the exclusive licensing and distribution agent for what was planned as a larger intellectual property. Viva Piñata was officially revealed by the two companies in March, which would consist of a video game and an animated television series that would simultaneously release in the fall. 4Kids had chosen Viva Piñata over a selection of Microsoft IP that was given out.

The cartoon, which premiered the same time as the game's release, was tied very closely to the game, and its animations were based on the game's own 3D character models, with Rare's Gregg Mayles approving episodes for their applicability to the game during the show's development. The cartoon was also designed to give viewers tips on how to interact with the in-game piñatas. The animated series' storyline later influenced the plot of Trouble in Paradise.

=== Release ===
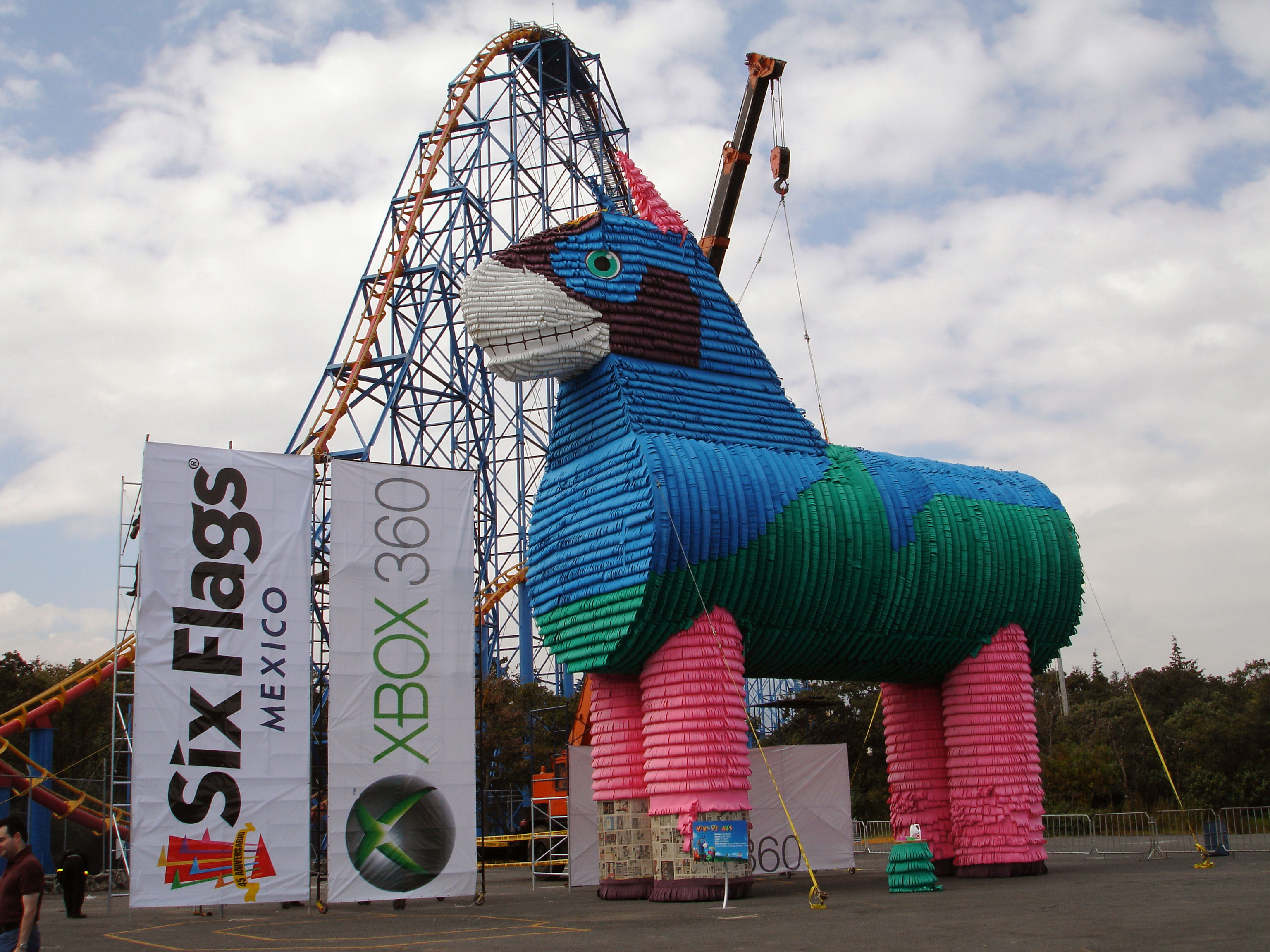
Hudson Horstachio, the world's largest piñata next to Superman El Último Escape at Six Flags México in 2006

After the release of Viva Piñata in 2006, its development team saw it as incomplete. The developers cut partial ideas from the release to meet their deadlines. Rare's Gregg Mayles said that the game sold well and steadily on par with their expectations and Xbox executive Phil Spencer added that the game was considered a success inside the company. The team incorporated player feedback and worked towards a "more definitive version" of the original. Additional Piñata accessories were sold as post-launch downloadable content.

During the Microsoft press conference at E3 2007, a Microsoft Windows port of Viva Piñata was announced. The conversion was handled by Climax Group. The game is part of the Games for Windows programme which offers easier installation and support for Windows Vista's Games Explorer, Xbox 360 Controller for Windows, Parental Controls, and the use of Games For Windows - Live.

In December 2006, Microsoft collaborated with amusement park Six Flags Mexico to promote the Xbox 360 as well as Viva Piñata. To accomplish this, a 48 feet (15 m) tall, 52 feet (16 m) long Horstachio piñata was constructed at the park. At the time, it was the largest recorded piñata ever built.

== Reception ==
Reception

Aggregate score
Aggregator	Score
Metacritic	X360: 84/100; PC: 78/100

Review scores
Publication	Score
1Up.com	X360: A
Eurogamer	X360: 8/10
GamePro	X360: 9/10
GameSpot	X360: 8.3/10; PC: 7.5/10
GameSpy	X360: 9/10
GameZone	X360: 9/10
IGN	X360: 8.5/10; PC: 8.2/10
Official Xbox Magazine (UK)	X360: 8/10
TeamXbox	X360: 8.4/10

Awards
Publication	Award
Academy of Interactive Arts & Sciences	Outstanding Achievement in Character Performance - Female (Louise Ridgeway)
Parents' Choice Foundation	Parents' Choice Award

Upon release, Viva Piñata received critical acclaim from video game journalists, with praise towards it graphics, color schemes, voice acting, strategic gameplay, replay value, and soundtrack. The game holds an 84% approval rating on the video game review aggregator Metacritic. Nearly a year after its release, Rare's Justin Cook said that the game had sold about 500,000 copies.

The graphics were unanimously praised by critics. Justin Calvert of GameSpot stated the attention to detail was "uniformly impressive", and asserted that the visuals were cohesive. Erik Brudvig of IGN found that the game's graphical slowdown during its frequent autosaving to be startling, although he praised the presentation overall. Andrew Taylor of the Official Xbox Magazine praised the vibrant use of colors and attention to detail. Will Tuttle of Team Xbox similarly stated the colors were "vividly vibrant" and the design aesthetics "remarkably appealing", although he also found the autosaving slowdown frustrating. Gerald Villoria of GameSpy stated the graphics were "breathtaking", and noted the color palettes of the piñatas themselves gave the appearance that they were "stripped directly from an animated show".

Critics commended various aspects of the gameplay. Calvert enjoyed the wide customization options and large number of piñata variations, stating that the gameplay itself was "silky smooth". Brudvig noted that there was a "ton to do"; he praised the encouragement of discovery and stated that it was "constantly filled with moments where you find something new to do". Tuttle commended the large number of piñatas, stating that finding managing all of the resources is "a lot of work". Villoria praised the "surprisingly deep" strategic gameplay, saying that it was one of the most "entertaining and fulfilling" experiences for the Xbox 360.

Many critics have often cited Viva Piñata as one of the best titles for the Xbox 360. Christopher Cruz for Rolling Stone ranked the game sixteenth in their list of the best Xbox 360 games, while IGN placed the game nineteenth on their list, praising Viva Piñata for its simplicity and vibrant aesthetics. Eurogamer included Viva Piñata on their list of "The 10 Xbox 360 Games That Mattered the Most", calling it a "relatively frivolous but boundlessly lovely life simulation and management game", further praising the game's soundtrack, visuals, and gameplay. Tristian Jurkovich for Game Rant also included the title in their list of the "Greatest Xbox 360 Masterpieces", with Keith Stuart for The Guardian ranking the game second on their list of the twelve best Xbox 360 video games, calling it "an enjoyable, relaxing and deceptively deep experience."

=== Accolades ===
The Academy of Interactive Arts & Sciences awarded Viva Piñata with "Outstanding Achievement in Character Performance - Female" (Louise Ridgeway as Leafos) during the 10th Annual Interactive Achievement Awards; it also received nominations for "Console Game of the Year", "Family Game of the Year", "Outstanding Innovation in Gaming", and outstanding achievement in "Art Direction" and "Visual Engineering". The music score by Grant Kirkhope was nominated for Original Score at the 2007 BAFTA awards. The game was nominated for the "Best Original Game" in X-Play's "Best Video Games of 2006" awards. Other accolades include a Parents' Choice Award from the Parents' Choice Foundation. and GameSpot included the title as one of their ten nominees for their "2006 Game of the Year" award, although it received only 3% of the total votes. In 2010, Viva Piñata was featured in 1001 Video Games You Must Play Before You Die.

== Legacy ==
In January 2026, the soundtrack for Viva Piñata was re-released digitally, and was re-recorded by a live orchestra. Grant Kirkhope, the original composer for the 2006 game, returned to record the soundtrack in preparation for the game's 20th anniversary. In an interview with Screen Rant, Kirkhope stated that "Working on Viva Piñata was one of my favourite projects [...] I think I shed a tear after the first few notes of ‘Island Welcome’, it was fantastic to hear my music being played by real people, they bring it all to life in a way that only humans can." The re-recorded soundtrack, titled Rare Treats: Viva Piñata Revisited, went up for pre-order in the form of a vinyl record on 9 January 2026 and was available digitally on Spotify the same day. The physical record, alongside the compact CD variant, was released in September 2026.

In March 2026, video game journalists began comparing Viva Piñata to Pokémon Pokopia, a social-simulation sandbox game developed by Game Freak and Omega Force, and published by Nintendo. Many critics have compared Pokopia to Viva Piñata for its habitat-building and creature-attraction mechanics, but also for its calming atmosphere and soothing soundtrack. As you progress through both games, the players must fulfill increasingly complex needs to attract rarer Pokémon, similar to attracting rare Piñata. Critics have also cited both games as very similar in terms of raising, taming, and attracting animals. Steve Watts, in his review for GameSpot, wrote: "What surprised me most, though, was the way [Pokopia] reminded me of one of my favorites, the cult classic Viva Piñata. That's because the core mission at the heart of Pokemon Pokopia is building new habitats that will attract the attention of particular Pokémon, similar to tending to your garden in Viva Piñata." Alex Donaldson for Eurogamer also pinpointed the similarities to both games, commenting: "There's also the Animal Crossing esque stuff, which I didn't reach in this build - having a house, decorating the interior, etcetera. There is clearly more than the loop I describe - but my hands-on gave me the impression that of all the games this shares a similarity to, it's that Viva Piñata loop which is at Pokopia's heart - and goodness, it really rather works." Considering these similarities between the games, journalists often cite Viva Piñata as a spiritual inspiration for Pokopia.

=== Sequels ===
A sequel, Viva Piñata: Trouble in Paradise was released in September 2008. The sequel adds more than 30 new piñata species, a "Just for Fun" sandbox mode, and new co-operative modes, as well as new desert and arctic environments. The original game and Trouble in Paradise were later re-released as part of the 2015 Xbox One compilation Rare Replay, but the server that handled their piñata sharing features had been shut down by that time. In June 2019, both games were enhanced to run at native 4K resolution on Xbox One X.

Rare made a Nintendo DS version of the game, titled Viva Piñata: Pocket Paradise, released in September 2008. Key changes include a control scheme which makes use of the stylus, as well as the presence of additional context-sensitive information on the second screen. A party game spin-off, Viva Piñata: Party Animals was released for the Xbox 360 in October 2007. Developed by Krome Studios, the game features the TV show piñata characters competing in races and various party mini-games.
