= Viva Piñata =

Video game franchise

- Genre: Life simulation
- Developers: Rare; Krome Studios
- Publishers: Xbox Game Studios; THQ
- Platforms: Xbox 360; Windows; Nintendo DS; Xbox One
- First release: Viva Piñata; November 9, 2006
- Latest release: Viva Piñata: Pocket Paradise; September 5, 2008

Viva Piñata is a video game franchise created and produced by Xbox Game Studios and Rare. The series' first game, Viva Piñata (2006), was conceived as a mobile gardening game before Rare was acquired by Microsoft. It was released on Xbox 360. It launched alongside an animated series produced by 4Kids. The game received two console sequels: Viva Piñata: Party Animals (2007) and Viva Piñata: Trouble in Paradise (2008), as well as a handheld release, Viva Piñata: Pocket Paradise (2008), for the Nintendo DS.

== Development ==
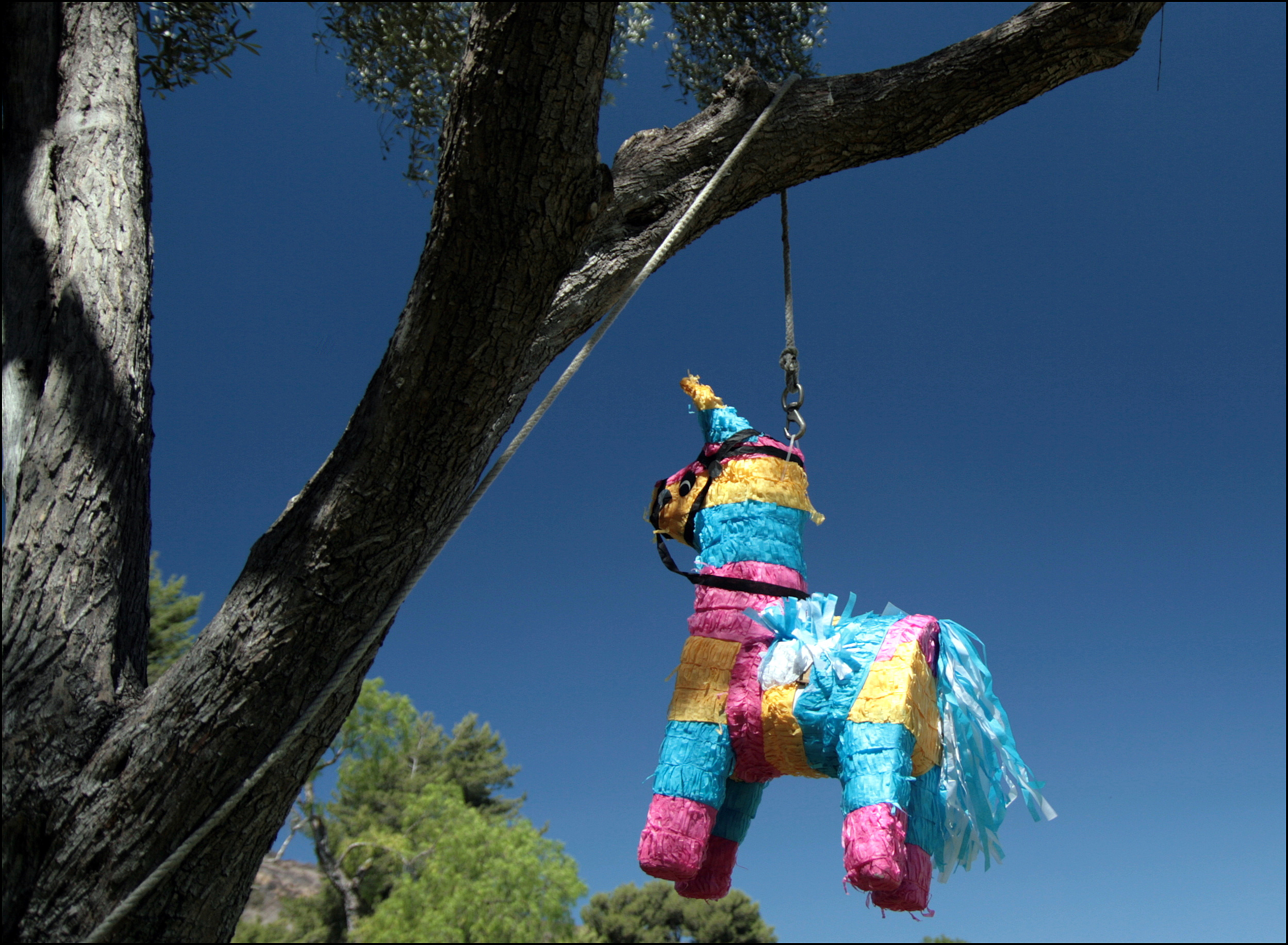
Rare decided on the game's animal and gardening motif before adding the piñata (pictured) theme.

Tim Stamper, the co-founder of Rare, conceptualized a gardening game for the handheld Pocket PC platform around 2002. A small (three-person) team began work on a simple prototype while Rare was still affiliated with Nintendo, prior to its Microsoft acquisition. The game's development transferred to the original Xbox and, ultimately, to the Xbox 360 for its graphics capabilities. Rare wanted its animals to have a unified style, which was how the game's concept artist arrived at the piñata concept. The idea was exciting to Rare, as piñatas were not commonplace in England. The connection between piñatas and candy-filled insides led to new gameplay directions.

The Viva Piñata team was a model for productivity and regular output within Rare and Xbox Game Studios. Though compared to the 12-person teams behind earlier Rare games, the company's Xbox 360 development teams consisted of 50 to 60 people. The Viva Piñata team included about 50 people at its zenith. Microsoft also transitioned its development teams to use the company's XNA package to streamline and reduce duplication in engineering efforts. Microsoft pressured the Viva Piñata development team to keep the game's themes kid-friendly, as the parent company planned for the game and resulting franchise to increase the market appeal of their Xbox 360. In 2006, a Microsoft Games executive called the game its most important franchise, but its reception was tepid.

As Rare released the original Viva Piñata for the Xbox 360 in 2006, its development team saw it as incomplete. The developers had cut partial ideas from the release in order to meet their deadlines. Rare's Gregg Mayles said that the game sold well and steadily on par with their expectations and Xbox's Phil Spencer added that the game was considered a success inside the company. The team incorporated player feedback and worked towards a "more definitive version" of the original. Mayles left the team to work on Banjo-Kazooie: Nuts & Bolts and Justin Cook became the team's lead designer. The sequel was built atop the original and the developers re-used many of the tools from the original game's development. In both the sequel and the original, the development team volunteered to record the sounds used for the piñatas. One of the team's new ideas was "Piñata Vision", a feature that detects printed cards via the Xbox camera to change the in-game environment (e.g., adding piñatas or altering the weather). Near the time of the sequel's release, Rare's Mayles figured that the team would likely not have enough new gameplay ideas to warrant a sequel to Trouble in Paradise, though Cook said that he would work on the game's shop interface had he more time. The games were later re-released on the 2015 compilation of Rare games, Rare Replay, but the server that handled their piñata sharing features had been shut down by that time.

In-between the two series releases, Krome released Viva Piñata: Party Animals. In early 2007, a Microsoft Games executive had expressed interest in continuing the series onto the Nintendo DS platform. Rare had attempted to make Trouble in Paradise's camera features work with Pocket Paradise, but chose instead to release the games on time.

== Games ==
Aggregate review scores
Game	Metacritic
Viva Piñata	84/100
Viva Piñata: Party Animals	56/100
Viva Piñata: Trouble in Paradise	82/100
Viva Piñata: Pocket Paradise	82/100

- Viva Piñata (2006)
- Viva Piñata: Party Animals (2007)
- Viva Piñata: Trouble in Paradise (2008)
- Viva Piñata: Pocket Paradise (2008)

== Animated series ==
Viva Piñata was planned as a larger intellectual property. 4Kids TV had agreed to make a Viva Piñata cartoon before the game was released. 4Kids selected the series out of several Microsoft properties offered. 4Kids also handled the series merchandising. The cartoon is tied very closely to the game, and its animations are based on the game's own 3D character models. Its episodes are approved by Rare's Gregg Mayles for their applicability to the game. The cartoon was also designed to give viewers tips on how to interact with the in-game piñatas. The animated series' storyline later influenced the plot of Trouble in Paradise.
