= Grant Kirkhope =

British composer

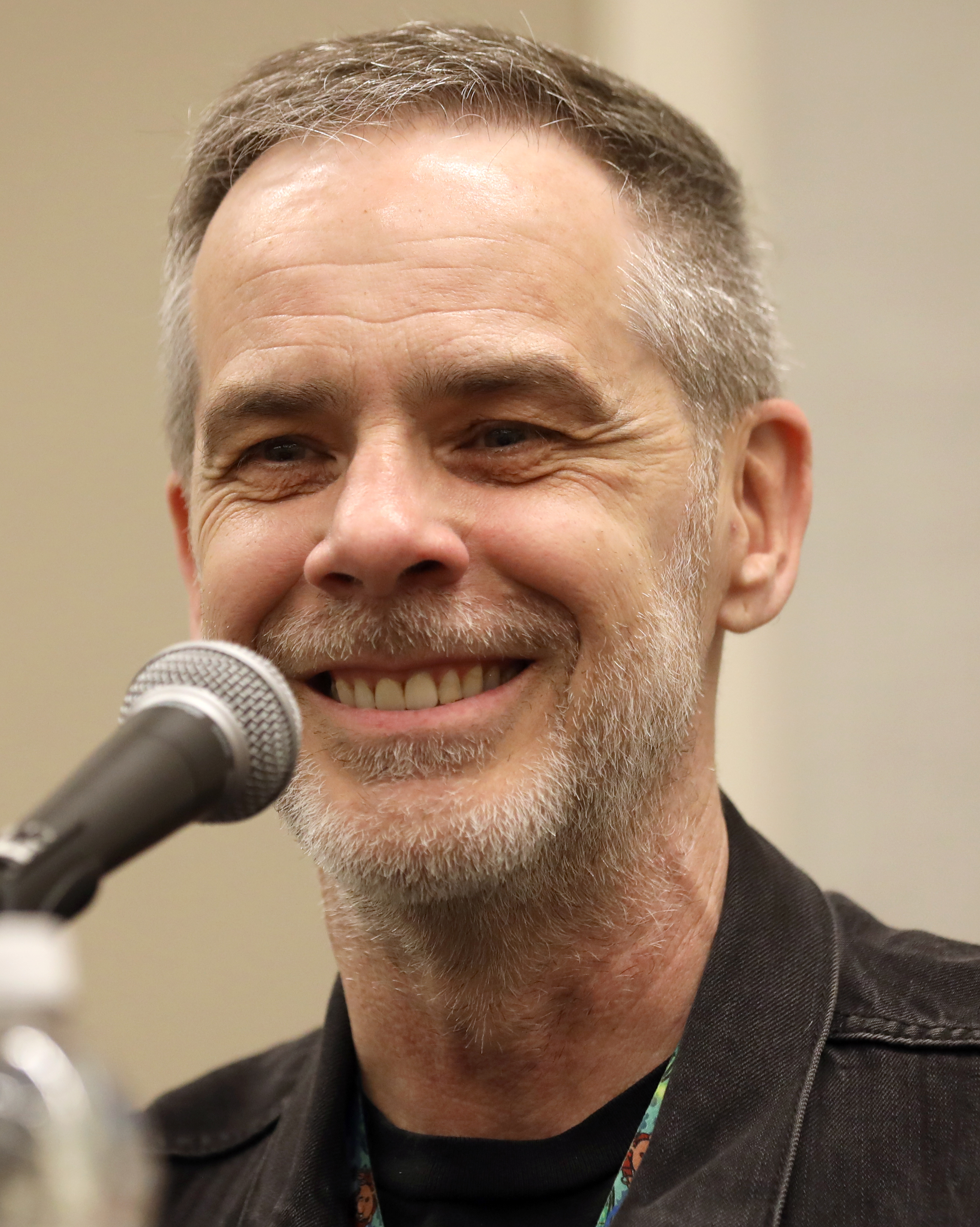
- Kirkhope in 2024

Background information
- Born: 10 July 1962 (age 64); Edinburgh, Scotland
- Occupations: Composer, voice actor
- Years active: 1995–present
- Label: Materia Collective
- Website: www.grantkirkhope.com

Grant Kirkhope (born 10 July 1962) is a Scottish composer and voice actor for video games and film. Some of his notable works include GoldenEye 007, Banjo-Kazooie, Donkey Kong 64, and Perfect Dark, among many others. He has won an Ivor Novello Award for Mario + Rabbids Sparks of Hope and a World Soundtrack Award for The King's Daughter, as well as being nominated for BAFTA, ASCAP, and IFMCA awards. He has also provided the voice for the character Donkey Kong in many of his game appearances.

== Early life and education ==
Kirkhope was born in Edinburgh, Scotland, where his mother, Margaret Kirkhope, worked as a music hall dancer. Kirkhope's father, Alexander Kirkhope, was works manager of Redpath Brown steel works and was an avid music fan and exposed him to early influences such as Frank Sinatra and Glenn Miller. Kirkhope taught himself to play guitar at age 11 and is classically trained in the trumpet. Kirkhope was brought up in Knaresborough, North Yorkshire from the age of five, and attended King James's School. Kirkhope played in various bands after leaving the Royal Northern College of Music, including Zoot and the Roots along with the saxophonist Snake Davis. Kirkhope also spent many years as part of "the Big Bad Horns" which were part of UK rock band Little Angels. Kirkhope joined Rare in October 1995, he played for two bands called Syar and Maineeaxe where he played the guitar and already knew Robin Beanland, another Rare composer.

== Career ==
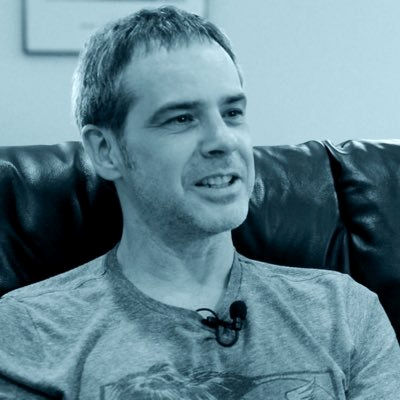
Kirkhope in 2016

Kirkhope is an Ivor Novello Awards and World Soundtrack Awards winning, BAFTA, ASCAP and IFMCA-nominated composer who has created the soundtrack for various video games. Kirkhope's score for Viva Piñata was nominated by BAFTA in the Original Score category in its 2007 awards.

Kingdoms of Amalur: Reckoning was nominated for Best Score for a Video Game or Interactive Media by the International Film Music Critics Association and in the Cue Awards 2012 for Best Overall Score, Best Video Game Score and Grant was also nominated for Best Break Out Composer.

Kirkhope was nominated in the 2015 ASCAP Composer’s Choice Awards for his work on “Civilization: Beyond Earth” and also won the Best Original Score for a Video Game or Interactive Media 2015 from the International Film Music Critics Association for the same score. Civilization: Beyond Earth also won Best Score: Video Game at the Cue Awards 2015. He was nominated in the 2016 ASCAP Composer’s Choice Awards for his work on Civilization: Beyond Earth – Rising Tide and was also nominated for Best Original Score for a Video Game or Interactive Media 2016 from the International Film Music Critics Association for the same score. Civilization: Beyond Earth – Rising Tide was also nominated for Best Score: Video Game at the Cue Awards 2016.

He won the award for Best Score at the Silicon Beach Film Festival for the score to the feature film Shadows directed by Michael Matteo Rossi in 2020. The score to the animated short The Wrong Rock was nominated for Original Score - Short Film (animation) at the Hollywood Media in Music Awards in 2021. The score to the feature film The King's Daughter won the People's Vote Award at the World Soundtrack Awards in 2022. The score for Mario + Rabbids Sparks of Hope was nominated for Score - Video Game and the score for 'The King's Daughter was nominated for Score - Fantasy Film at the Hollywood Music and Media Awards in 2022.

Kirkhope won an Ivor Novello Award for his score for Mario + Rabbids Sparks of Hope in 2023 and was nominated for Best Video Game Score at the World Soundtrack Awards for the same score in 2023.

Kirkhope was also involved in casting the voice actors for the Viva Piñata cartoon.

== Personal life ==
Kirkhope moved to the United States in 2008 to work on Kingdoms of Amalur: Reckoning and became a naturalized United States citizen in March 2017. As of 2012, he and his family reside in southern California.

== Work ==
=== Video games ===
Year	Title	Notes	Ref.
1996	Killer Instinct 2/Gold	Performed live guitar and trumpet	
1996	Donkey Kong Land 2	Conversion of David Wise's Donkey Kong Country 2: Diddy's Kong Quest soundtrack	
1997	GoldenEye 007	With Graeme Norgate and Robin Beanland	
1997	Blast Corps	Performed live guitar	
1998	Banjo-Kazooie		
1999	Donkey Kong 64		
2000	Banjo-Tooie		
2000	Perfect Dark	With Graeme Norgate and David Clynick	
2002	Star Fox Adventures	Performed live guitar	
2003	Grabbed by the Ghoulies		
2005	Conker: Live and Reloaded	Performed live guitar	
2006	Viva Piñata	With Steve Burke	
2008	Viva Piñata: Trouble in Paradise	With Steve Burke	
2008	Banjo-Kazooie: Nuts & Bolts	With Robin Beanland and David Clynick	
2012	Kingdoms of Amalur: Reckoning	With Mark Cromer	
2012	Fart Cat!		
2012	CityVille 2		
2013	Desktop Dungeons	With Danny Baranowsky	
2013	Castle of Illusion Starring Mickey Mouse	Remake of the original game's soundtrack by Shigenori Kamiya, along with original compositions	
2014	Puzzle Charms		
2014	Yaiba: Ninja Gaiden Z		
2014	The Enchanted Cave 2		
2014	Civilization: Beyond Earth	With Geoff Knorr, Michael Curran and Griffin Cohen	
2015	Civilization: Beyond Earth - Rising Tide	With Geoff Knorr and Griffin Cohen	
2015	Crypt of the NecroDancer	Special thanks	
2015	Rare Replay	Special thanks	
2016	Ghostbusters		
2017	Dropzone		
2017	Mario + Rabbids Kingdom Battle	Also scored Donkey Kong Adventure DLC	
2017	Yooka-Laylee	With David Wise and Steve Burke	
2017	A Hat in Time	Guest composer	
2017	Tangledeep		
2019	Yooka-Laylee and the Impossible Lair	With David Wise, Dan Murdoch and Matt Griffin	
2019	Super Smash Bros. Ultimate	Guest composer, "Spiral Mountain" arrangement	
2019	Interstellar Space: Genesis	With Ryan McQuinn	
2019	Cadence of Hyrule	Special thanks	
2020	World of Warcraft: Shadowlands	With Neal Acree, David Arkenstone, Jason Hayes, Glenn Stafford and Jake Lefkowitz	
2020	Kingdoms of Amalur: Re-Reckoning	With Mark Cromer	
2021	Minecraft Dungeons: Hidden Depths	With Peter Hont and Rostislav Trifonov	
2022	Mario + Rabbids Sparks of Hope	With Gareth Coker and Yoko Shimomura	
2024	HorrorVale	Guest composer	
2024	Street Fighter 6	Guest composer	
2025	Star Racer		
2025	Yooka-Replaylee	With Dan Murdoch and Matt Griffin	
2026	Rayman Legends Retold	With Christophe Héral	
TBA	Bradley the Badger		
TBA	Lobodestroyo	Guest composer	
TBA	Poglings	Guest composer	
Cancelled	Project Dream	With David Wise	
Unreleased	Hex Heroes		

=== Film ===
Key
†	Denotes films that have not yet been released

Year	Title	Notes
2015	We Sit. We Drink. No Guns.	Short film
2017	Mulva Lends a Hand	Short film
2017	How to Apply for a Sexual Position	Short film
2017	Heavy Flow	Short film
2017	Killer Charm	Short film
2018	Roadmap Jerusalem	Short film
2018	Hammer Jackson	Short film
2018	The Wrong Rock	Short film
2021	The Handler	
2021	Bringing Back Goldeneye	
2022	Shadows	
2022	The King's Daughter	With John Coda and Joseph Metcalfe
2023	The Super Mario Bros. Movie	Composer of the DK Rap from Donkey Kong 64 (uncredited)
TBA	The Charisma Killers †	
TBA	Murder Syndicate †	

=== Web ===
==== Pilots ====
Year	Title	Notes	Ref.
2026	Gameoverse	Composer; with Jake Kaufman	

=== Voice acting ===
Year	Title	Role(s)	Notes
1998	Banjo-Kazooie	Mumbo Jumbo, Jinjo, The Jinjonator, Gravestone, Flower Pot, Gruntling	
1999	Donkey Kong 64	Donkey Kong	
2000	Banjo-Tooie	Mumbo Jumbo, Jamjars, King Jingaling, Jinjo	
2003	Banjo-Kazooie: Grunty's Revenge	Mumbo Jumbo, Jinjo	Archive sound
2003	Grabbed by the Ghoulies	Cursed Mummy, Zombie Pirates	
2003	Donkey Kong Country GBA	Donkey Kong	Archive sound
2003	Donkey Konga	Donkey Kong	Archive sound
2003	Mario Golf: Toadstool Tour	Donkey Kong	Archive sound
2003	Mario Kart: Double Dash	Donkey Kong	Archive sound
2004	Mario vs. Donkey Kong	Donkey Kong	Archive sound
2004	Donkey Kong Country 2 GBA	Donkey Kong	Archive sound
2005	Banjo-Pilot	Mumbo Jumbo, Jinjo, King Jingaling	Archive sound
2005	Donkey Kong Jungle Fever	Donkey Kong	Archive sound
2005	Mario Kart Arcade GP	Donkey Kong	Archive sound
2005	Donkey Kong Country 3 GBA	Donkey Kong	Archive sound
2006	Mario vs. Donkey Kong 2: March of the Minis	Donkey Kong	Archive sound
2006	Donkey Kong Banana Kingdom	Donkey Kong	Archive sound
2006	Viva Piñata	Barkbark, Cocoadile, Elephanilla, Rashberry	
2007	Mario Kart Arcade GP 2	Donkey Kong	Archive sound
2008	Viva Piñata: Trouble in Paradise	Barkbark, Cocoadile, Elephanilla, Rashberry	
2008	Banjo-Kazooie: Nuts & Bolts	Jamjars	Archive sound
2009	Mario vs. Donkey Kong: Minis March Again!	Donkey Kong	Archive sound
2010	Mario vs. Donkey Kong: Mini-Land Mayhem!	Donkey Kong	Archive sound
2013	Mario and Donkey Kong: Minis on the Move	Donkey Kong	Archive sound
2013	Mario Kart Arcade GP DX	Donkey Kong	Archive sound
2017	Macbat 64	Monkey	
2017	Yooka-Laylee	Crazy Kirkhope	
2019	Super Smash Bros. Ultimate	Mumbo Jumbo, Jinjo	Archive sound
2021	Terrain of Magical Expertise	Captain Gast	
