= Viva Piñata: Pocket Paradise =

2008 video game

- North American box art
- Developer(s): Rare
- Publisher(s): THQ
- Designer(s): Gary Richards; Joseph Humfrey; Paul Machacek
- Artist(s): Dean Smith; Dermot Fanning; Chris Peil
- Composer(s): David Wise
- Series: Viva Piñata
- Platform(s): Nintendo DS
- Release: NA: September 8, 2008; EU: September 5, 2008; AU: September 25, 2008
- Genre(s): Life simulation
- Mode(s): Single-player

Viva Piñata: Pocket Paradise is a life simulation game developed by Rare, for the Nintendo DS video game console and based on Viva Piñata. Released days after Viva Piñata: Trouble in Paradise for the Xbox 360 in the fall of 2008, Pocket Paradise was developed by Rare's handheld team, as opposed to Viva Piñata: Party Animals and the PC version of the original game, which were developed by separate third-party developers. It is currently the latest game Rare developed for a Nintendo system, as well as currently the final game in the series and is also the only game of the series as a whole to be handheld.

== Gameplay ==
Main game view (info panel displaying the Garden Terrain % and the appearance of a Chocstrich)

Viva Piñata: Pocket Paradise is, like its predecessor, a sandbox game that tasks the player with turning a neglected plot of land into a beautiful garden. The game retains the majority of features and all of the piñata from the original. As the game was built from the ground up for the DS, Rare's handheld team took the opportunity to add additional features and changes.

=== Controls ===
The most obvious difference between Pocket Paradise and the original is that the entire game is controlled using the stylus, giving the player a very direct, intuitive method of interacting with their garden. It is now possible to simply ‘draw’ grass onto soil, or double tap a flower to remove its head.

The game also makes use of the two screens on the DS where, for the majority of the game, the main garden view is displayed in the lower screen of the DS. In the upper screen, there is a context sensitive information panel that is unique to this version of the game. The information that is displayed dynamically changes to reflect what is currently selected - ranging from an individual piñata's romance requirements to a percentage breakdown of the garden's floor tiles. It is even possible to swap the screens around and interact with the information panel, to view a comprehensive piñata encyclopedia, a journal, an awards page and a piñata pyramid (amongst other things).

=== Unique features ===
Overhead map

Other than control changes, there are a handful of design changes that are unique to this version of the game. First off, it is no longer possible to buy fertiliser or romance sweets. Fertiliser (which is now accessed via the main tools pallet) is only produced when a Taffly is made to interact with a piece of fruit - the colour of the fruit dictates the colour of the fertiliser. Romance sweets are now earned by completing Viva Piñata Central challenges, putting much more emphasis on what was originally a purely optional aspect of the game. Another major difference between the DS version and the original is the addition of an overhead map that not only enables the player to view the whereabouts of their piñata instantly, but allows them to zoom in on any pinata by simply tapping their icon.

A new game mode has also been added that mirrors the "Just for fun" mode in Viva Piñata: Trouble in Paradise, named “Playground”. This is a no-pressure version of the main game (set on a beach) where young or inexperienced players can experiment without having to deal with the challenging aspects of the game, such as Dastardos or Ruffians, or having to pay for items.

Rare explains on their website that "you'll also be given free rein with an expanded selection of tools and tool actions, upgraded forms of the Journal and Encyclopedia... and Episodes (tying in more closely to the TV series and allowing fans of the show to spend quality time with familiar faces)". They also state that "DS wireless connectivity... lets you send prime Piñata specimens to your friends, making the act of parading your Doenut around in a humiliating pirate outfit easier than ever".

== Development ==
Back in 2005, Electronic Gaming Monthly reported that Rare was hard at work on two projects for the Nintendo DS. Their first Nintendo DS game released was Diddy Kong Racing DS, so that game and Viva Piñata were most likely the two projects mentioned.

Viva Piñata for the Nintendo DS was first hinted at in an interview between Microsoft Game Studios and 1UP.com at the DICE 2007 Summit in Las Vegas.

The game was presented later at Comic-Con 2007 and THQ officially announced the release of Viva Piñata: Pocket Paradise in the Fall of 2008.

In the interview with members from the team, the question "Was it always the plan to transfer Viva Piñata across to the DS, or did it take some prompting?" received the response from the game's producer Paul Machacek: "In discussions for a follow-on project for DKR DS it became a greater focal point, and in hindsight, seeing what we came up with, it's proven to be a complete no-brainer. We love it".

== Critical reception ==
Reception

Aggregate scores
Aggregator	Score
GameRankings	82.58%
Metacritic	82/100

Review scores
Publication	Score
1Up.com	B+
Edge	7/10
Eurogamer	8/10
GamesMaster	85%
GamesTM	8/10
IGN	8.5/10
Nintendo World Report	7/10
Official Nintendo Magazine	90%
NGamer	85/100
IGN UK	8.9/10

Viva Piñata: Pocket Paradise won the award for Best Simulation Game for the Nintendo DS from IGN in their 2008 video game awards. Viva Piñata: Pocket Paradise also received a pair of 2009 BAFTA nominations for Best Strategy Game at the Game Awards and Best Video Game at the British Academy Children's Awards.
