= X (Xbox show) =

Annually held trade show by Microsoft

- Status: Inactive
- Genre: Video games
- Venue: Various
- Location: Various
- Country: Various
- Inaugurated: October 16, 2001; 25 years ago
- Most recent: November 14, 2019; 6 years ago
- Organizer: Microsoft Gaming
- Filing status: Corporate
- Website: www.xbox.com/en-US/x019

X (sometimes called the X0 events) was an annually held trade show hosted by Microsoft Gaming, showcasing its Xbox portfolio of hardware, software, and services.

Microsoft Canada also organised an X0 event every year to present its games primarily for the Canadian press, rather than an international audience. This show first started in 2002 and was open to the public in 2006. The last Canadian event, X13 Media Preview was held in Toronto in 2013.

== List of events ==
Event	Dates	Venue	Country
X01	16-17 October 2001	Cannes	France
X02	24-25 September 2002	Seville	Spain
X03	16-17 September 2003	Nice	France
X04	No event held		
X05	4-5 October 2005	Amsterdam	Netherlands
X06	29–30 September 2006	Barcelona	Spain
X07	No event held		
X08	No event held		
X09	No event held		
X10	11 February 2010	San Francisco	United States
X11	No event held		
X12	No event held		
X13	No event held		
X014	No event held		
X015	No event held		
X016	No event held		
X017	No event held		
X018	10–11 November 2018	Mexico City	Mexico
X019	14–16 November 2019	Copper Box Arena, London	United Kingdom
X020	No event held		
X021	No event held		
X022	No event held		
X023	No event held		
