= Kameo =

2005 action-adventure video game for Xbox 360

Kameo: Elements of Power
- North American box art
- Developer: Rare
- Publisher: Microsoft Game Studios
- Director: George Andreas
- Producer: Lee Schuneman
- Programmer: Phil Tossell
- Artist: Mark Stevenson
- Composer: Steve Burke
- Platform: Xbox 360
- Release: NA: November 22, 2005; EU: December 2, 2005
- Genre: Action-adventure
- Modes: Single-player, multiplayer

Kameo: Elements of Power is a 2005 action-adventure video game developed by Rare and published by Microsoft Game Studios. The player controls Kameo, a 16-year-old elf princess, who must travel across a fantasy land and its realms, rescuing her family while collecting Elemental Sprites and Warriors in a beat 'em up style combat system, in order to defeat the troll king Thorn and her treacherous sister Kalus. Kameo's ten elemental powers let her transform into creatures and use their varied abilities to solve combat-oriented puzzles and progress through the game's levels.

Kameo is known for its prolonged development cycle, which spanned four Nintendo and Microsoft consoles. It was conceived as a Pokémon-style game of capturing and nurturing monsters, but traded its lighthearted Nintendo overtones for darker themes more befitting of Xbox audiences when Microsoft acquired the developer. In this process, Kameo was repurposed from a fairy to an elf—a transition the game's director later concluded was unsuccessful. While nearly finished for the original Xbox console, the title was delayed to become an exclusive launch title for the upcoming Xbox 360. Rare used the extra time to improve the game's audiovisuals, including Rare's first orchestral soundtrack, and add a local cooperative multiplayer mode. Kameo released alongside the Xbox 360 launches: November 2005 in North America and several weeks later in Europe.

The game received generally favorable reviews and sales estimates ranged from subpar to par. Reviewers praised Kameo's graphics as setting standards for the new console, and noted its vivid color palette. Their criticism focused on the gameplay, in particular its repetition, awkward controls, easy combat, disorganized introduction, and overbearing tutorial. Reviewers found the story and Kameo's character lackluster, but largely liked the other characters and the core morphing concept. They had high praise for the orchestral score and other technical features, apart from the game's camera. Rare released several cosmetic downloadable content packs, and a free online cooperative mode upgrade.

Retrospective reviews remembered the game for its bright and impressive graphics. Kameo was included in Rare Replay, an August 2015 compilation of 30 Rare titles for the Xbox One, alongside documentary-style videos about the game's development and its planned sequel. The sequel was canceled after a few months of production due to both poor sales of the original and Microsoft's new focus on games for its Kinect peripheral.

== Gameplay ==
In the third-person action-adventure game Kameo (pronounced "cameo"), the player controls the titular character, an elf who inadvertently sabotaged her older sister Kalus' reputation before her coronation, causing Kameo to be given the crown and the Elemental Powers that come with it instead. Feeling slighted by this, Kalus frees the troll King Thorn and forms an alliance to take back her crown and the remaining elemental sprites. Kameo uses elemental powers to transform into creatures with different abilities, which she switches between to solve puzzles and advance through the in-game world. The player controls the player-character with the left analog stick, the game's camera view with the right thumbstick, and the character attacks and abilities with the controller's triggers. The Xbox 360 controller's face buttons swap between three active, elemental powers.

This screenshot of Kameo in the game's overworld typifies the bright color palette for which it was known.

These ten "elemental warriors" include a fire-breathing creature who lights torches, a gorilla who climbs walls and throws foes, and a plant who punches opponents. There are two each of five element types (fire, ice, plant, rock, water). Some enemies have specific weaknesses and can only be affected by specific elemental powers or hazards in the environment. The game is structured such that new character abilities unlock just as their benefits are needed to solve a puzzle. Thus the game's puzzles depend on combat more than logic. Each of the elemental forms has several ability upgrades, which the player can redeem by collecting and delivering fruit to a sacred tome called the Wotnot book. The Kameo character, herself, can move faster than the elemental warriors but has no special ability apart from breaking crates.

The game begins as Kameo advances through a castle—with the help of three elemental powers—to rescue her family. As the tutorial prologue ends, Kameo loses her elemental powers and is ejected from the castle into the Enchanted Kingdom to grow stronger and try again. Kameo travels through four themed worlds (water, ice, fire, and swamp) at the outskirts of the Badlands, the overworld that connects the areas. Each of the worlds are interspersed with townsfolk and combat-oriented puzzles. Kameo can either travel to the worlds through the Badlands, where the elves and trolls skirmish, or warp from the Enchanted Kingdom. A help system built into the game provides hints or direct solutions for struggling players. Throughout the kingdom, Kameo finds and defeats the seven shadow creatures each guarding one of her elemental powers, while saving her family earning the other 3.

The player can slow time by landing successive hits and kills on enemies to fill an on-screen meter. The player can return to levels to attempt a higher score. The game's action sequences, more than half of the game, require the player to defeat groups of enemies before proceeding to the next room, and ultimately leading to a boss battle. Kameo has a two-player, split-screen cooperative gameplay mode in which players can fight alongside each other during the action scenes. Rare added support for online cooperative play (via Xbox Live or System Link) as a downloadable patch following the game's release.

== Development ==
Rare's protracted development of Kameo spanned four consoles: Nintendo's Nintendo 64 and GameCube, Microsoft's Xbox, and ultimately, the Xbox 360. The game became known for its long development cycle—IGN wrote that the game had received more IGN editor coverage during its development than "almost any other single game". In the final game, a recipe can found that reads "Take one Cube of ice… Add two beetles from a Box of Creepy Crawlies… Heat to 360 degrees…" which alludes to the development cycles on each console. Shortly after Rare finished work on Donkey Kong 64, Kameo began as a game in which the player catches and evolves creatures. In lead designer George Andreas's concept, the creatures would follow the player and act of their own volition. This version had a "Nintendo feel" and Pokémon-like concept: the player nursed little monsters into adults. Kameo spent several years in development for the GameCube and Rare shared an early version of the game at E3, an annual video game conference. In the meantime, Microsoft acquired Rare in September 2002 for a record price of $377 million. Kameo lost many of its Pokémon elements when development transferred to the Microsoft's Xbox. Rare's Phil Tossell liked the Pokémon-style concept but ultimately felt that the platform change was a positive move for the game.

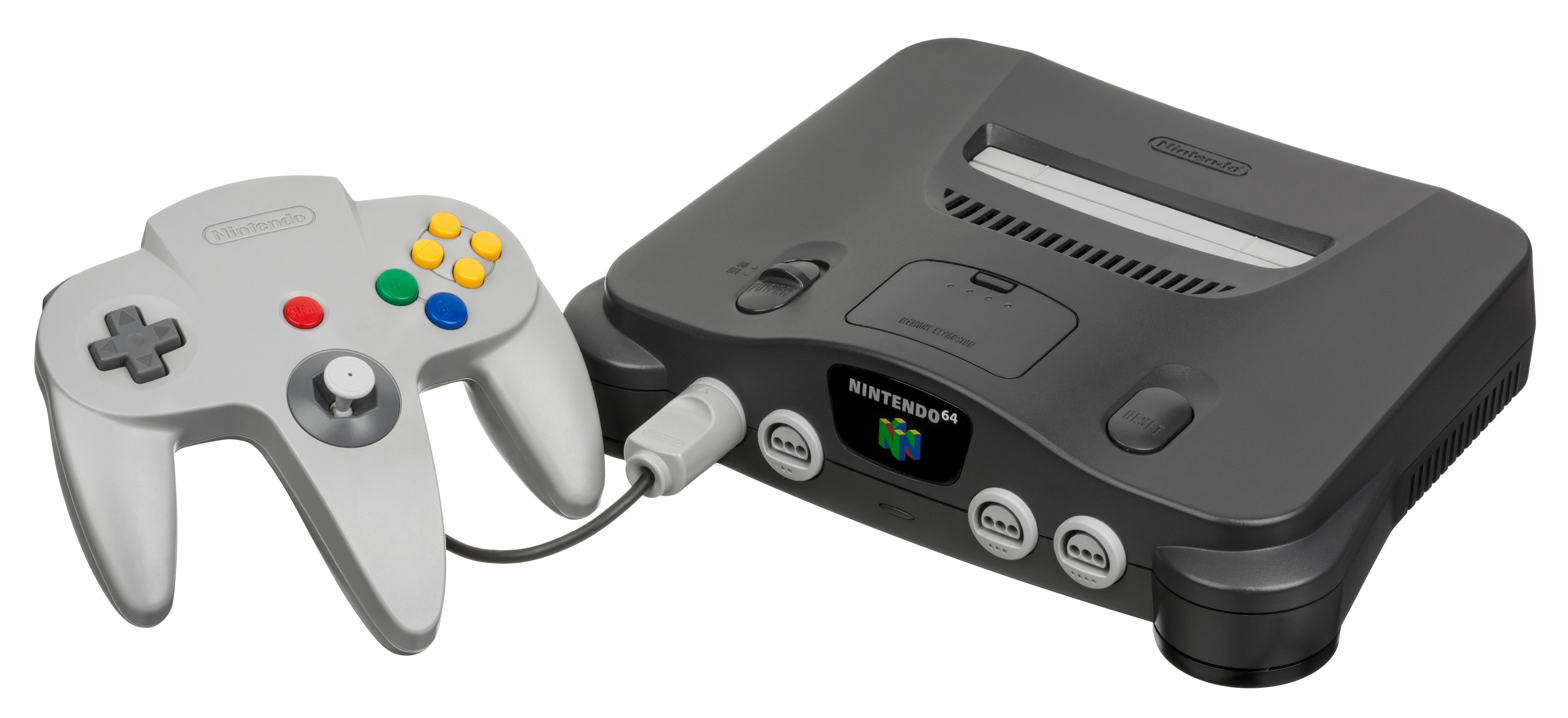
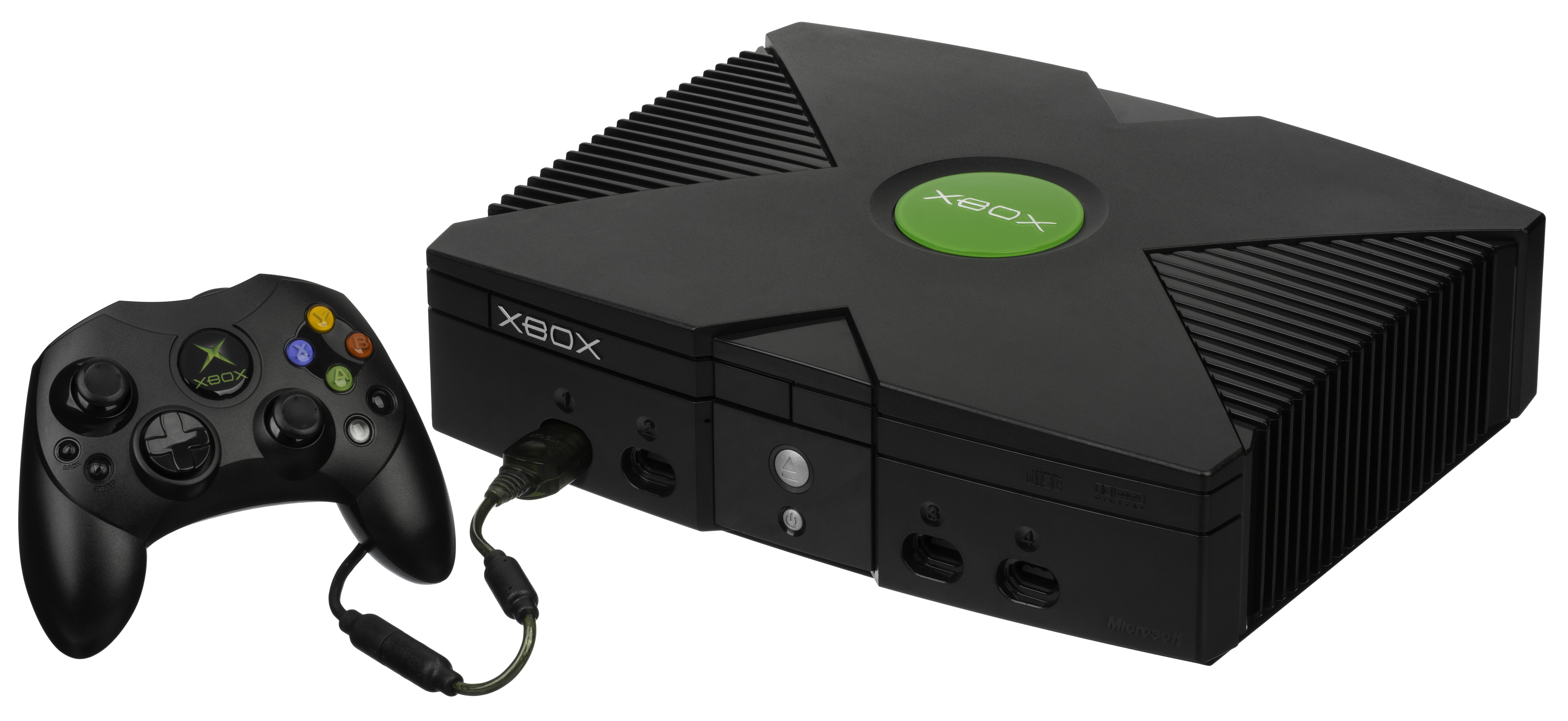
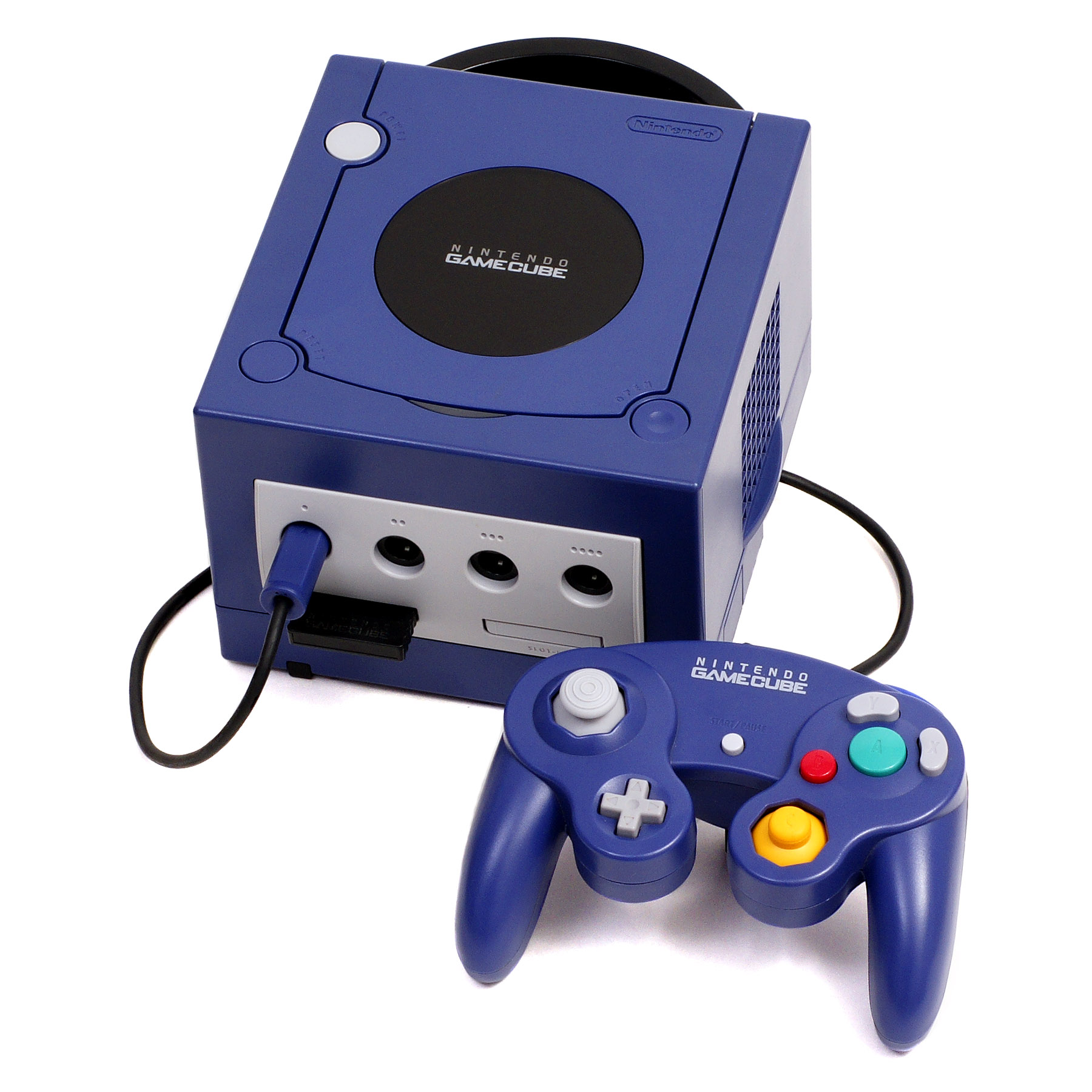
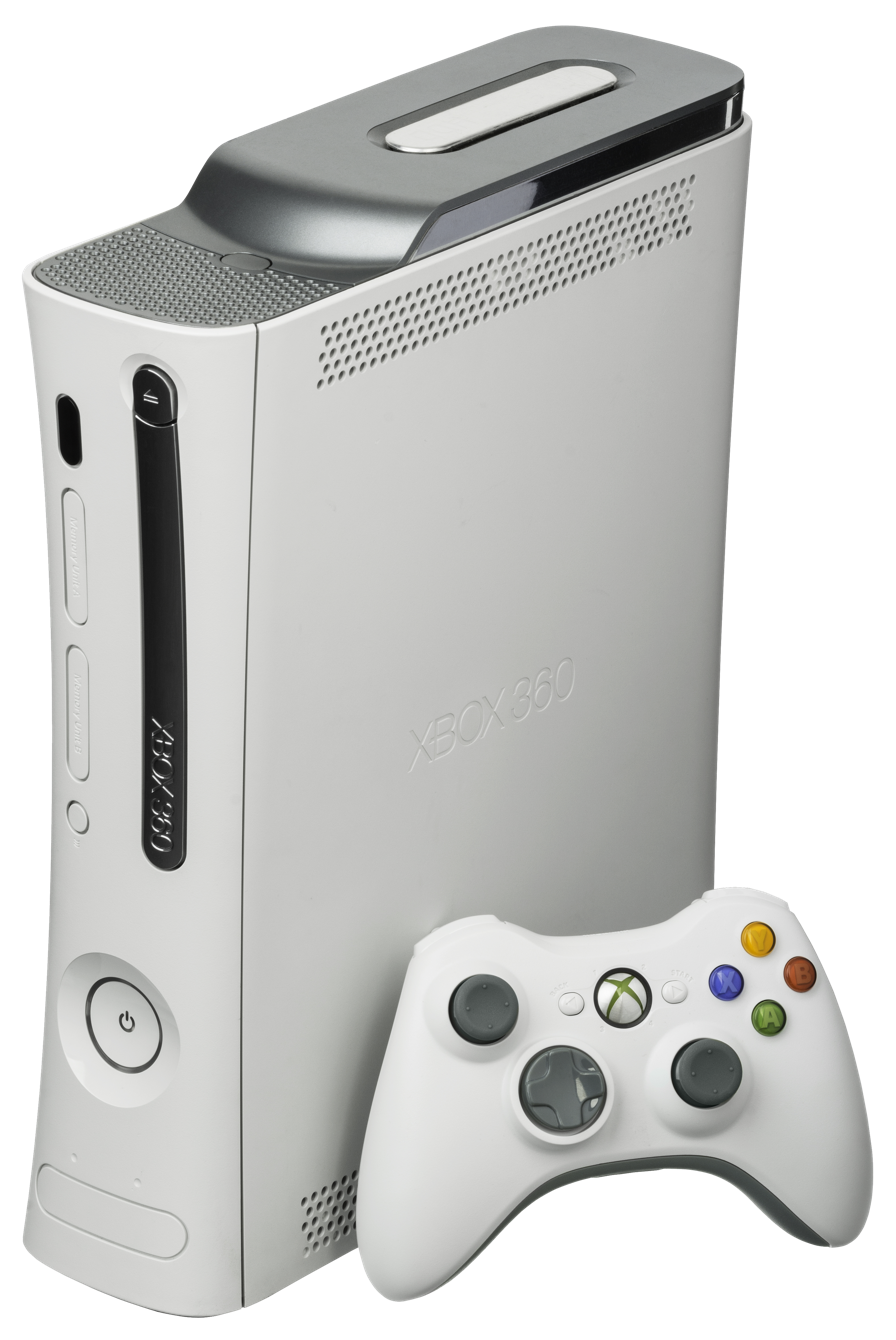
Kameo's protracted development spanned four consoles

The team distilled the original concept into the core gameplay mechanics that players preferred, namely the abilities to morph into characters and to fight. In what became the core gameplay, the player would use a combination of Kameo's elemental warriors to progress through levels. Rare later expanded the concept to that of an adventure game, though its story was secondary to the gameplay. Kameo was designed for fluidity—the team tried to minimize player chores and player waiting times. The team simplified the set of characters from a hundred to a dozen, and expanded the skill sets of those remaining. Tossell designed these characters, and started with a boulder-like animal. These creature designs later became Kameo's morphing forms. As the game transitioned and Rare attempted to distance itself from its mawkish reputation for "cute characters with big eyes", the team struggled to repurpose Kameo into an elf from the fairy of the original concept. Tossell felt that this task was impossible, as Microsoft simultaneously wanted to widen its base while it did not give Rare the room to grow out of its cutesy design. The Kameo character transitioned through a "tribal" look before becoming an elf, and her own attacks were ultimately repurposed into the elemental warriors'. Kameo became an Xbox 360 launch title (alongside Rare's Perfect Dark Zero) and received a graphics upgrade in the process. The game had been about 80% complete for the original Xbox, but the transition freed the game's vision from technical constraints.

With their timeframe extended, the development team added extra attacks for the ten characters, day–night transition interactions, in-game scores and leaderboards, a cooperative multiplayer splitscreen mode, and a post-release update that extends the cooperative mode over online and local network. The team revisited level ideas that did not fit on the previous console, and transitioned from synthesized music and a text-based story to an orchestral soundtrack and voice acting. The cooperative mode was also added retroactively, which challenged the already finalized level design. The most pronounced improvements were in the game's graphics and upgrades. Levels on the Xbox 360 could hold thousands of characters on-screen at once. The team playtested the feel of each elemental warrior and spent extra time refining the gradual difficulty increase in the opening level. In reflection, the project's biggest influences were ultimately Nintendo, Pokémon, and Resident Evil.

Around the time of Kameo's release, lead designer George Andreas felt that the original Kameo concept of finding and using monsters had evolved and carried through to the final product. He said that there were enough ideas for a sequel within the new intellectual property if players were interested. Years later, Andreas reappraised and said that the game should never have been released and remains a sore subject for him to discuss. Since the project was nearly finished, they had opted for launch title release instead of starting over. Andreas felt that the effort to conceal the fairy Kameo as an elf was unsuccessful and that the character did not match the Xbox's first-person shooter demographic.

Rare and Microsoft Studios released Kameo alongside the Xbox 360 console as a launch title: on November 22, 2005, in North America, and December 2 in Europe. The game was available for purchase in retail stores ahead of the console's launch date. At release, it was sold at a lower price than other Xbox 360 games. In advance of its February 2, 2006, Japanese release, Microsoft Japan held a Kameo promotional press event with celebrities Yoshinari Tsuji and Kaori Manabe in late January 2006. 1UP.com reported the event as "subdued" but appropriate for Japanese games journalists to test Kameo, as the Xbox 360 had been selling poorly in the region.

=== Audio ===
Steve Burke served as the audio lead on the Kameo project, his first at Rare, for which he composed its soundtrack and contributed to its sound effects and voiceovers. As the game was originally planned for the GameCube, the first few months of development appeared to have no support for audio above the MIDI sample-style compositions characteristic of Nintendo's previous console, the Nintendo 64. The game's first demo at the 2001 Electronic Entertainment Expo used this type of audio. Of the first pieces he wrote for this project in the early months of 2001, some were scrapped. Others were re-recorded as streaming audio, which plays pre-recorded audio files, when the developers added support. It became Rare's first orchestral soundtrack. Other Rare staff members contributed their talents to the recording process, such as trumpet and voice recordings.

Burke experimented with a variety of musical styles throughout the game's development. Burke's original compositions were lighthearted as befitting for a Nintendo game, but became darker along with other parts of the game to match the Xbox audience when Microsoft acquired Rare. The composer thought that this transition was reflected in the soundtrack, with some Nintendo-style music juxtaposed against the roaring orchestral tracks. Burke estimates that he had written four hours of audio for the project and ultimately recorded 80 minutes with an orchestra and choir over four days in Prague. The team recorded the orchestra and choir separately. Sumthing Else Music Works published the soundtrack on compact disc and for download via the iTunes Store and Amazon. Based on the exemplary original music composed for the game, the Academy of Interactive Arts & Sciences recognized Kameo with a nomination for the Outstanding Achievement in Original Musical Composition award during the 9th Annual Interactive Achievement Awards.

== Reception ==
A year prior to Kameo's release, GamesRadar wrote that while they highly anticipated the title and expected it to be of high quality, they thought the game's continual delays would likely hurt the final product. Closer to release, Tom Bramwell (Eurogamer) added that he had expected the game to be the best among the Xbox 360 launch titles. Kameo's core gameplay concept brought his anticipation to par with that customary for The Legend of Zelda titles, and he thought the game would reap the benefits of its long development through refined audiovisuals. Xbox executive Peter Moore announced Kameo as his favorite launch title in anticipation of the Xbox 360's launch.

Reception

Aggregate score
Aggregator	Score
Metacritic	79/100

Review scores
Publication	Score
1Up.com	B−
Eurogamer	5/10
G4	4/5
GameSpot	8.7/10
GameSpy	4/5
IGN	8.4/10
Play	9.5/10
The Times	5/5

The game received "generally favorable" reviews, according to video game review score aggregator Metacritic. Market research company NPD Group reported that Kameo sold 300,000 copies while Retro Gamer reported that the game sold over 700,000 copies. GameSpot described the NPD Group figures as significantly below expectations and the sales of Rare's other Xbox 360 launch title, Perfect Dark Zero. Retro Gamer described its figures as "respectable ... for a new franchise". Rare senior software engineer Nick Burton said that while Kameo and Perfect Dark Zero had reputations for poor sales, the two games "sold phenomenally well" for launch titles. Kameo continued to sell three years after its release.

Reviewers praised the game's graphics as setting standards for the new console. David Clayman (IGN) saw Kameo as a good demonstration of the Xbox 360's graphical possibilities, and Bramwell (Eurogamer) considered the degree of detail, even at long distances and in processor-intensive scenes, "unprecedented in a console game". Though he had few points of reference for the new console, Clayman (IGN) wrote that the extremely detailed high-definition graphics appeared worthy of the Xbox 360's "next generation" moniker. When paired with surround sound, the experience was "almost overwhelming". Reviewers also noted the game's vivid color palette. Kasavin (GameSpot) wrote that the developers balanced the visual elements to appeal to children and adults alike. Andrew Pfister (1UP.com) wrote that the game looked marvelous but was sometimes distracted by too much occurring onscreen.

Critics praised the core morphing concept but criticized its repetitive gameplay, awkward controls, easy combat, disorganized introduction, and overemphasis on tutorial. Bramwell (Eurogamer) wrote that though the fundamental idea was good, the repetitious combinations of elemental attacks were rarely novel and often laborious. The excitement of realizing a puzzle's solution, Bramwell said, was often ruined by the player's struggle to perform the task correctly. He wrote that the game's design constrained players and "bred apathy". For example, tutorials followed the scenes in which they would have been useful, cutscenes left no puzzle solution to imagination, puzzle solutions were rarely revisited after their first use, and character dialogue overstated the importance of simple puzzles. Bramwell was "desperate" for the freedom to experiment without forced guidance. "The game", he wrote, "hardly ever stops telling you what to do." Clayman (IGN) agreed that there was too much help but alternatively appreciated the continual challenge and activity density of Kameo's level design, with townspeople interspersed within the level's action. He also liked to experiment in the Badlands as a break from the puzzles. Clayman found the game's combat easy but fun. He especially enjoyed the slowed time combat. Bramwell (Eurogamer) said that the "relative pleasure" of Kameo's combat was ultimately worth little, as the player could use basic attacks and avoid most major upgrades throughout the whole game. Phil Theobald (GameSpy) added that character upgrades were required for maintaining interest in the gameplay, but that the game does not incentivize finding such combinations. Pfister (1UP.com) too found the gameplay balance and puzzle design insipid.

Reviewers found the story and Kameo's character lackluster, but largely liked the other characters. Andrew Reiner (Game Informer) said that the story tracked through every imaginable video game cliché and failed to build emotional attachment. Clayman (IGN) noted that he spent little time as Kameo, the character. He found the elemental warriors more useful, interesting, and original, and felt that the ten powers were balanced so as to make each worth playing. Dave Halverson agreed that the multiple character options represent a rare breadth of player choice, while Pfister (1UP.com) wrote that only a few of the characters had abilities worth regularly using and called the "terrible" character design typical for the developer. Clayman (IGN) thought that Kameo's character was comparatively less interesting than that of the rest of the cast. Kasavin (GameSpot) agreed that Kameo visually appeared "generic" while other characters and environments had exceptional and inspired style. Alternatively, Halverson (Play) thought of the "breathtaking female lead" as the "quintessential fantasy icon".

Reviewers made positive remarks about the game's orchestral score and voice acting. Kasavin (GameSpot) wrote that added choral tracks during intense in-game moments gave the game epic overtones, though Clayman (IGN) thought the score made the game environments feel delusively majestic. Bramwell (Eurogamer) found little joy in the verbose dialogue, which he often skipped even during important scenes, but Kasavin (GameSpot) considered the voice acting amusing, with good quality. He also praised the level of nuance in the sound effects, such as those made as characters walked.

Clayman (IGN) reported that the game had no major technical issues, which was a major concern in the protracted run-up to the game's release. He also found that most of its levels did not appear to leverage the Xbox 360's advances in areas apart from graphics. Bramwell (Eurogamer), on the other hand, fought the controls and camera throughout the game. He lamented a particular issue in which the camera would spin 180 degrees when Kameo was hit, which made the path of retreat harder to see. Theobald (GameSpy) also lamented the camera. Kasavin (GameSpot) found Kameo to be technically outstanding, and praised its automatic game save features, short loading times, steady frame rates, and detailed display on both standard- and high-definition televisions. Pfister (1UP.com) wrote that Kameo was technically impressive to the point of overwhelming the gameplay.

Critics noted the game's length as shorter than expected, with about ten hours of content. Clayman (IGN) had little desire to replay the solved puzzles and Bramwell (Eurogamer) was even eager for the game to end. Halverson (Play) planned to return to the game but wrote that he would have preferred five more hours of the single-player over the Xbox Live features. Reviewers were largely unimpressed with the extra Xbox Live cooperative play and score attack features. Halverson (Play) had hopes for Kameo and Psychonauts to rekindle developer interest in the 3D platforming genre, but concluded that such games were likely not to return. Clayman (IGN) did not find the game to live up to its publicity as a competitor against The Legend of Zelda series, though Theobald (GameSpy) thought Kameo's boss battles were comparable. Pfister (1UP.com) noted several traditional Rare flourishes—lots of color and graphics effects, puns for character names—but ultimately wrote that Kameo was proof that Microsoft had received "exactly what they paid for" in its acquisition of Rare. Theobald (GameSpy) said that Rare had avoided its usual tropes of making players collect many items and poor character design, and made a "worthy" launch title. Nigel Kendall (The Times) wrote that the game was "more cerebral" than the console's other games, which were stereotypically about driving, football, or shooting. Kasavin (GameSpot) noted that Kameo was the most accessible launch title to players of all ages. In summary, he thought the game was a suitable fit for players' first experiences on the new Xbox 360.

During the 9th Annual Interactive Achievement Awards, Kameo received nominations for "Outstanding Achievement in Original Musical Composition" and "Outstanding Achievement in Visual Engineering".

== Downloadable content ==
The game was released without online support for co-operative play, but Rare promised to add the feature as a free patch and did so in April 2006. The patch let two players play the story simultaneously when their consoles were connected through Xbox Live or System Link. It also added new achievements. For a fee, players could download a series of costume packs that change the visual appearance of the game's characters. In September 2006, Rare released the Kameo "Power Pack", which added leaderboards, a costume pack, new achievements, and three new modes of gameplay: Expert, Time Attack, and Rune Battle. Expert Mode remasters six of the game's levels with added difficulty. Time Attack Mode lets two co-op players (local or online) attempt to finish levels as fast as possible. Rune Battle Mode pits two co-op players against each other to collect the most rune items. Ben Kuchera of Ars Technica wrote that Rare "did a good job" of supporting Kameo with post-release content. He liked the idea of the time-based mode and thought that the Expert mode would allay criticism of the game's easiness.

== Legacy ==
In retrospect, Kotaku wrote that Kameo would be remembered as "that pretty Xbox 360 launch game", which IGN confirmed a year after its release. While some games journalists reported unfavorable views towards Kameo, they also reported its fanbase to be dedicated. Other games journalists described the game as underrated. Kameo was among the first batch of games to be sold digitally with the Xbox 360's Games on Demand service in August 2009.

Kameo was later included in Rare Replay, a compilation of 30 Rare titles, released for the Xbox One in August 2015. The game runs through emulation on the newer console. Kameo was among the first batch of games to be supported for the feature. The Rare Replay emulated release includes all original downloadable content for free and lets players migrate their Xbox 360 cloud saves to their Xbox One. Kameo's performance in the Xbox One's emulator slightly improves upon its technical performance on the Xbox 360 itself. Stephen Totilo (Kotaku) was surprised at his positive response to replaying Kameo on Rare Replay, having found the introductory stage off-putting when he sampled it at the Xbox 360's launch. He planned to return to the title. Chris Carter (Destructoid) wrote that while Kameo was not worth full price at its release, it was a welcome addition worth playing in the compilation. In June 2019, the game was enhanced to run at native 4K resolution on Xbox One X.

A sequel to Kameo was in production but was ultimately canceled. George Andreas began work on the sequel after finishing the first game. Kameo 2 was designed to be a darker take on the original. Rare redesigned Kameo to have smaller eyes and matured the other creatures. For instance, the trolls were given steampunk designs. The sequel put a heavier emphasis on the open world, as the team was influenced by Assassin's Creed (2007). Rare began to use Havok physics software for smoother inverse kinematics animations, and planned to incorporate assets from an unreleased game, Black Widow, which featured a giant, mechanical spider. For creature upgrades, the team planned to let Kameo fly as an eagle so the player could experience the grandeur of a bird's-eye view. Kameo composer Steve Burke said that he worked on the sequel for a year. He wrote several new audio tracks in a Celtic style and recorded voiceovers, which together were used in a concept demo pitched to Microsoft. The project was canceled after about three months of production as Rare re-focused on Microsoft's Kinect effort. At the time, Microsoft redirected its internal studios to support the project. The original's lackluster sales also contributed to the cancelation. The public had heard reports of its cancelation during the 2009 restructure and had seen an artwork leak in 2011, but the cancellation was not confirmed until Microsoft Studios vice president Phil Spencer did so in 2013. 1UP.com questioned whether Kameo needed a sequel at all. Rare released a retrospective documentary of the unreleased game as part of its August 2015 Rare Replay collection. Kameo 2 concept artist Peter Hentze narrated the documentary, which focuses on art that would have been included in the game apart from a brief video clip. Rare later released a follow-up making-of Kameo video in March 2016. The sequel's video did not elaborate on why Microsoft canceled the project.
