= Viva Piñata: Trouble in Paradise =

2008 video game

- Developer: Rare
- Publisher: Microsoft Game Studios
- Producers: Steven Brand; Adam Park
- Designer: Justin Cook
- Composer: Grant Kirkhope
- Series: Viva Piñata
- Platform: Xbox 360
- Release: NA: September 2, 2008; UK: September 5, 2008; AU: September 11, 2008
- Genre: Life simulation
- Modes: Single-player, multiplayer

Viva Piñata: Trouble in Paradise is a 2008 simulation video game for the Xbox 360. It is the sequel to the 2006 video game, Viva Piñata, and the third game in the Viva Piñata series. Developed by Rare and published by Microsoft Game Studios, the game builds atop its predecessor, in which the player tends a garden and the piñata creatures that come to live there. New features to the series include a cooperative multiplayer mode, a new plot, additional types of piñata creatures, Xbox Live Vision Camera support, and two new areas for capturing piñatas.

Microsoft considered Viva Piñata a success and the sequel's development team sought to make a more definitive version of the original. The team re-used many of the development infrastructure set up for its predecessor and exhausted their gameplay ideas for the piñata gardening concept.

Trouble in Paradise was released on 2 September 2008 in North America, 5 September in the United Kingdom, and in Australia the following week. Much like its predecessor, the game received highly positive reviews from critics upon release, with critics considering the game more accessible to newcomers and a worthwhile improvement on the original, but altogether closer to an expansion than a unique sequel. Reviewers praised its game design tweaks, but were mixed on its multiplayer modes and camera integration. The game is often cited as inferior compared to the original Viva Piñata. Trouble in Paradise was later included in the developer's 2015 Xbox One retrospective compilation, Rare Replay.

== Gameplay ==
Two players, indicated by the shovel and watering can, gardening in cooperation

Apart from a few new features, Trouble in Paradise is nearly identical to its predecessor, the 2006 Viva Piñata, in gameplay: The player acts as a gardener whose land is visited by piñata creatures. The creatures are stylized like piñatas but have the qualities of animals. Creature types include horses, raccoons, foxes, frogs, and bees, as well as new species like ladybugs, crabs, geckos, gorillas, penguins, and vultures. The player plants seeds, tends to plants, and digs ponds within the garden's boundaries. New types of piñata creatures visit and eventually come to reside in the garden when certain prerequisites are met. For instance, a piñata might be attracted to a garden with a specific plant, type of piñata, or amount of soil. The player uses an in-game encyclopedia to learn each piñata type's preferences, which grow in complexity: advanced creatures require more transformative changes to the garden or many other piñatas to eat. When multiple piñatas are satisfied, the player can "romance" two to make a baby piñata. The player continues to cultivate the garden and the piñata creatures to grow in experience level and unlock upgrades in garden size and gardening tools. An in-game store sells seeds, items, and upgrades. Both games are rendered in the same engine and their supporting casts are the same. The first game's online piñata gifting feature returns in Trouble in Paradise.

Atop the previous formula is a new plot, a cooperative multiplayer mode, Xbox Live Vision Camera support, 32 new types of piñata creatures, and two separate areas to trap piñatas. These latter areas—the Dessert Desert and Piñarctic—let the player set traps for wandering piñatas to bait, capture, and return to the garden. At a later player experience level, the player can add sand and ice to their main garden for the piñatas. In the new plot, the player must repopulate a database of piñata information that has been maliciously erased. Trouble in Paradise includes new challenges in which the player finds and indulges a specific piñata with actions it likes such that the piñata can be sent happily to a party somewhere around the world. The game also adds fashion show and side-scrolling racing minigames. A new "Trick Stick" lets players teach piñatas to perform new tricks. Up to four players can join together on Xbox Live to garden in the same plot. The plot's owner can set restrictions on what other players can access. Up to two players can join together locally on the same Xbox 360. The game's additional "Just for Fun" mode is designed for younger children by eliminating monetary restrictions, evil piñatas, and ruffian characters that might otherwise frustrate the player. These malicious "sour" piñatas, which contain evil versions of moles, crocodiles, wolves, and crows, as well as new sour species such as skunks, and scorpions, try to poison the other piñatas, they can be tamed to peaceably join the player's garden. Players can use the Xbox Live Vision Camera to scan collectible cards and unlock piñatas and items. New controls were added to streamline the player's interface interactions, and a leaderboard added for players to compare their progress.

== Development ==
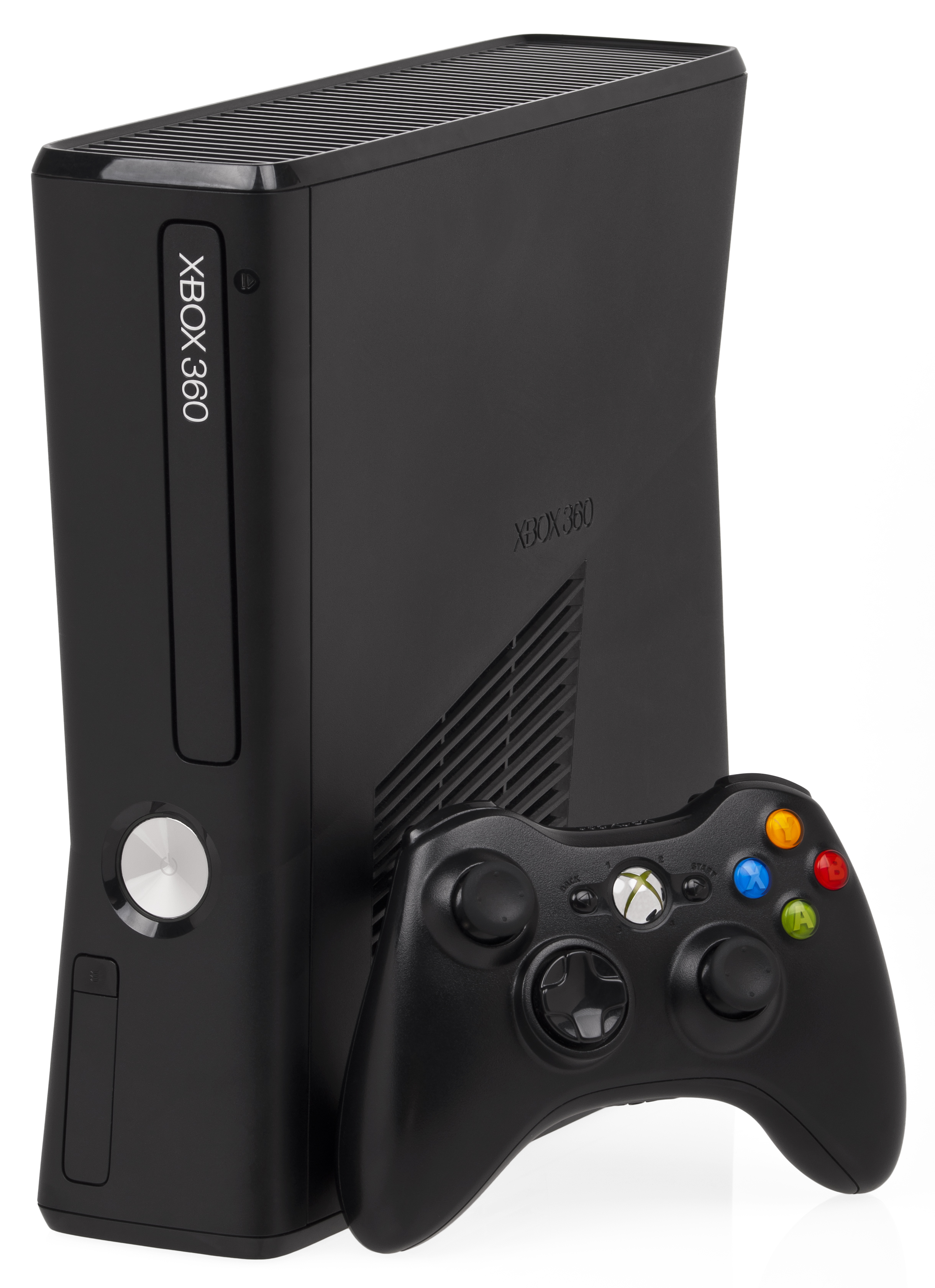
Much like its predecessor, Trouble in Paradise was released as an exclusive title for the Xbox 360 (pictured)

As Rare released the original Viva Piñata for the Xbox 360 in 2006, its development team saw it as incomplete. The developers had cut partial ideas from the release to meet their deadlines. Rare's Gregg Mayles said that the game sold well and steadily on par with their expectations and Xbox's Phil Spencer added that the game was considered a success inside the company. The team incorporated player feedback and worked towards a "more definitive version" of the original. Mayles left the team to work on Banjo-Kazooie: Nuts & Bolts and Justin Cook became the team's lead designer. The sequel was built atop the original and the developers re-used many of the tools from the original game's development. In both the sequel and the original, the development team volunteered to record the sounds used for the piñatas. One of the team's new ideas was "Piñata Vision", a feature that detects printed cards via the Xbox camera to change the in-game environment (e.g., adding piñatas or altering the weather).

Near the time of the sequel's release, Rare's Mayles figured that the team would likely not have enough new gameplay ideas to warrant a sequel to Trouble in Paradise, though Cook said that he would work on the game's shop interface had he more time. Trouble in Paradise released in early September 2008. (Note: The game released in North America on September 2, 2008, and Europe three days later.) The two Viva Piñata console games were later re-released in the 2015 compilation of Rare games, Rare Replay, but the server that handled their piñata sharing features had been shut down by that time. In June 2019, both games were enhanced to run at native 4K resolution on Xbox One X.

== Reception ==
Reception

Aggregate score
Aggregator	Score
Metacritic	82/100

Review scores
Publication	Score
Electronic Gaming Monthly	A
Eurogamer	8/10
GameSpot	8.5/10
GamesRadar+	4/5
IGN	8.5/10

Upon release, Trouble in Paradise received highly positive reviews from video game journalists. The game received "generally favorable" reviews, according to video game review aggregator platform Metacritic. Critics had found its predecessor surprisingly engaging, and thought that Trouble in Paradise's additions made it the definitive Viva Piñata release. Critics agreed that the changes made the game friendlier for new players and children. They appreciated the new game's improvements, but some were disappointed that the base game was essentially unchanged. Reviewers considered Trouble in Paradise to be an expansion of the original game rather than a unique sequel.

Critics praised Trouble in Paradise's new features. Mc Shea (GameSpot) thought that the sequel's in-game challenges resolved the core issue of the original game - the lack of motivation to continue breeding new species, whereas the challenges direct players to collect new species. He appreciated the two new trap areas for adding to the game's variety of characters, though he did not find the actual laying of traps and transport of piñatas interesting. Geddes (IGN) thought that it felt wrong but oddly satisfying to put piñatas in captivity. He considered the trap areas a good idea but unwelcome as another obstacle in the animal acquisition process. Geddes praised Trouble in Paradise's cooperative features, but found local cooperative to lose most of the benefits of efficient multitasking. Mc Shea (GameSpot) on the other hand felt that it was strange to be on either side of the cooperative gardening experience, which lacks the game's creative element when the visitor is directed by the garden's owner. Bramwell (Eurogamer) saw a lack of depth in the online gameplay, both in feelings of connections with others and in how online matchmaking became a brief "show and tell" of a garden instead of a cross-exchange like in Animal Crossing or Spore. Reviewers agreed that cooperative was useful for introducing new players to the game.

Reviewers considered some of the smaller additions useful and others gimmicky. Critics appreciated the release's time-saving interface tweaks and overall pacing, but thought, for instance, that the vision camera integration added little to the game. While Electronic Gaming Monthly had wanted more development of the story, Mc Shea (GameSpot) was grateful that the story remained in the background of the game. While Electronic Gaming Monthly wrote that loading times had been improved, Geddes (IGN) considered them "frustratingly long". Considering the previous game's slow start, Tom Bramwell (Eurogamer) thought that Trouble in Paradise did a better job of introducing the player to the world by pre-loading player gardens with animals, plants, and decorations, and offering a tutorial. He wondered whether the game went too far, from too slow to hyperactive.

Reviewers praised Trouble in Paradise's bright visuals and cute characters. Mc Shea (GameSpot) was impressed by the game's visuals and wrote that players would continue playing the game if only to unlock nuanced, animated video of piñatas acting cute during major life milestones. Mc Shea recalled the human helper characters as an exception, who were off-putting with creepy masks and "offensive" voice acting. IGN praised the game's surround sound but not its soundtrack's composition, and Mc Shea (GameSpot) considered the voice acting harsh against the game's otherwise tranquil mood.

Mc Shea (GameSpot) called Trouble in Paradise "a safe sequel to a great game". Ultimately, Geddes (IGN) wrote that an expansion pack on the original game would have served the same function. Even with Trouble in Paradise's upgraded controls, Bramwell (Eurogamer) preferred the precision of the Nintendo DS version's stylus or of a computer mouse, and thought the game could be further simplified. However, he saw the new release as a more polished opportunity to attract an audience that was not originally convinced by the reception of the first game. Electronic Gaming Monthly said that players that hated the original game would not be swayed by the sequel. GameSpot's 2008 year in review staff nominated but did not award Trouble in Paradise as the "Best Game No One Played".
