= Viva Piñata: Party Animals =

2007 video game

- North American box art
- Developer: Krome Studios
- Publisher: Microsoft Game Studios
- Director: Steve Stamatiadis
- Producers: Robin Smith; Earnest Yuen
- Designer: Cameron Davis
- Programmers: Steve Williams; Nathanial Ryall
- Artist: Jason Stark
- Composers: Cedar Jones; Gavin Parker; George Stamatiadis; Peter Wayne
- Series: Viva Piñata
- Platform: Xbox 360
- Release: NA: October 30, 2007; AU: November 15, 2007; EU: November 16, 2007; JP: December 6, 2007
- Genre: Party
- Modes: Single-player, multiplayer

Viva Piñata: Party Animals is a 2007 party video game developed by Krome Studios for the Xbox 360 as part of the Viva Piñata series. The game was released on October 30, 2007, in North America, November 15 in Australia, November 16 in Europe, and December 6 in Japan.

Unlike the original Viva Piñata, Party Animals is based on elements from the television show, including its characters and voices. Furthermore, the title provides a minigame based experience, similar to the Mario Party series, rather than the sandbox environment of the original. There are over 40 minigames, as well as kart-style races which are conducted on foot. The game received generally mixed reviews by critics upon release.

== Gameplay ==
Similar to other casual Xbox 360 titles such as Fuzion Frenzy 2, Viva Piñata: Party Animals is framed as a game show, where contestants compete against each other while announcers provide colorful commentary.

A game of Party Animals consists of three or more race events, each followed by one or more randomly selected challenge mini-games (depending on selected game length). The goal is to be the player who has earned the most candy ("Candiosity") after the final challenge is completed. Games always feature four player characters, although only one of these need be human-controlled. Multiple individuals can play on a single console (causing races to be conducted split-screen), or players can play online via Xbox Live.

Players earn candy based on their performance during the challenge mini-games, with fixed awards for first, second, third, and fourth places. The races themselves do not earn players candy, but instead determine a bonus which influences the winnings from the challenge events which follow. As a result, candy awards are always a combination of these two separate placements, with players required to do well in both event types to guarantee overall victory.

There are eight playable characters: Hudson Horstachio, Paulie Pretztail, Fergy Fudgehog and Franklin Fizzlybear, as well as their female counterparts, Hailey Horstachio, Petunia Pretztail, Francine Fudgehog and Florence Fizzlybear, featured in the TV series episode "Hudson's Better Half".

== Development ==
Viva Piñata: Party Animals was developed by a team of roughly 60 people at Krome Studios, the first Australian studio to develop a first-party game for Microsoft. The involvement of Rare, responsible for the original Viva Piñata, was limited to supplying artwork and information about the game's visual style, while Krome retained full control over the design.

When asked why the studio was chosen, Microsoft VP Shane Kim explained: "They've got a long history in the industry and we have a ton of respect for their work", referring to Krome's previous efforts on series such as Ty the Tasmanian Tiger and Spyro the Dragon. In the same interview, Kim also noted that the Viva Piñata franchise was important to the success of the Xbox 360 in the casual game space: "Our aspiration is to win this generation, and in order to do that, we know we have to appeal beyond the core gamer segment".

== Reception ==
Reception

Aggregate score
Aggregator	Score
Metacritic	56%

Review scores
Publication	Score
Game Informer	5.5/10
GameSpot	5.5/10
GameSpy	3/5
IGN	5.6/10
Official Xbox Magazine (US)	7.5/10

Viva Piñata: Party Animals was not particularly well received by the gaming press, despite the appreciation of its vibrant visuals. IGN criticized the fact that many of the mini-games were simply minor variants of each other, with most being aimed at young children. The review remarks that "a few of them will be enjoyable for those under the age of seven, but if you're any older than that there's absolutely no challenge to be found within Party Animals". The GameSpot review similarly frowned upon the lack of true variety, noting that "... the [minigame] variants end up feeling so similar to one another that the game might as well just have six minigames".

Somewhat more positive remarks were earned from TeamXbox, where the reviewer felt that the better mini-games balanced out the poorer ones. The review concludes: "The wide range of minigames almost guarantees everyone will find at least something they like in the title, and I've yet to find anyone who didn't get a thrill out of the game's fast paced racing".
