= Outlaws (1985 video game) =

1985 video game

- Publisher: Ultimate Play the Game
- Designers: Dave Thomas; Robert Thomas
- Platform: Commodore 64
- Release: UK: December 1985
- Genre: Shooter
- Mode: Single-player

Outlaws is a video game for the Commodore 64 released by Ultimate Play the Game in 1985. In a break from earlier action-adventure titles such as The Staff of Karnath and Entombed, Outlaws is a straightforward shooter game and does not feature the aristocrat adventurer Sir Arthur Pendragon.

Outlaws was released on the Commodore 64 at the same time as another Wild West-themed title, Gunfright, for the ZX Spectrum. The game was created by brothers Dave and Robert (Bob) Thomas.

== Introduction ==
Outlaws

Outlaws

Typically for an Ultimate release, players are given a tantalising and cryptic introduction:

Outlaws

Many years ago, rode a band of men. They came from the East of the desert and with them they brought terror and destruction. Nobody was safe from the perils of a merciless death, no family was complete, no man was free.

They were the OUTLAWS.

Driven only by murderous ambition and selfish greed they scoured the land, leaving behind them a trail of death and pillage. Town after town they plundered, with no man left who could stop them and no man left alive who dare try. The townsfolk lived at their mercy and prayed that the evil band of men's dark shadow of doom would not pass over their valley. Frightened though they were, they still found hope, and they prayed that one day someone would come and deliver them from the OUTLAWS' evil tyranny.

The Lone Rider

Many months of hell passed and then one night out of a clear moonlit sky, arose a fiery storm and through this storm rode a man, a stranger with vengeance in his eyes. He had no name and no past, he had been sent to avenge them, for he was the LONE RIDER.

== Reception ==
Reception

Review scores
Publication	Score
Computer and Video Games	29/40
Zzap!64	35%

The game was poorly reviewed. Zzap!64 rated the game with 35%, stating that "Ultimate [had] surely seen better days" and that "there is nothing much to say about Outlaws, except how mediocre it is", but the graphics were generally praised as being "crisp" and having "excellent equestrian" animation. Commodore User were similarly unimpressed, describing the game as a "massive disappointment". Although they thought the graphics were of a high standard and sound fairly effective, the music was considered to be "awful" and "well below standard". Overall it was said to "lack depth" and could have been better if there was more for the player to do.
