= Jetman =

Jetman may refer to:

- Jetman, a character in a series of video games:
  - Jetpac, 1983
  - Lunar Jetman, 1983
  - Solar Jetman: Hunt for the Golden Warpship, 1990
  - Jetpac Refuelled, 2007
- Chōjin Sentai Jetman, the 1991 Super Sentai television series.
- Jetman, nickname for Swiss inventor and aviator Yves Rossy
