= Blast Corps =

1997 action game

- North American box art
- Developer: Rare
- Publisher: Nintendo
- Directors: Paul Mountain; George Andreas
- Producers: Chris Stamper; Tim Stamper
- Designer: Martin Wakeley
- Artist: Ricky Berwick
- Composer: Graeme Norgate
- Platform: Nintendo 64
- Release: JP: March 21, 1997; NA: March 24, 1997; PAL: September 5, 1997
- Genres: Action, puzzle
- Mode: Single-player

Blast Corps is a 1997 action game developed by Rare and published by Nintendo for the Nintendo 64. The player uses vehicles to destroy buildings in the path of a runaway nuclear missile carrier. In the game's 57 levels, the player solves puzzles by transferring between vehicles to move objects and bridge gaps. It was released in March 1997 in Japan and North America. A wider release followed at the end of that year.

The game was Rare's first game for the Nintendo 64. Its development team ranged between four and seven members, many of whom were recent graduates. The team sought to find gameplay to fit Rare co-founder Chris Stamper's idea for a building destruction game. The puzzle game mechanics were inspired by those of Donkey Kong (1994).

Blast Corps was released to critical acclaim and received Metacritic's second highest Nintendo 64 game ratings of 1997. The game sold one million copies — lower than the team's expectations — and received several editor's choice awards. Reviewers praised its originality, variety, and graphics, but some criticized its controls and repetition. Reviewers of Rare's 2015 Rare Replay retrospective compilation noted Blast Corps as a standout title.

== Gameplay ==
Screenshot of gameplay in which the player uses a bulldozer to clear a path for the carrier. Radar and an arrow in the lower-left corner show the proximity of objects in the carrier's way.

Blast Corps is a single-player action video game. The player controls vehicles to destroy buildings, such as farms and other structures, in the path of a runaway nuclear missile carrier. The player fails if the carrier collides with an object. The eight demolition vehicles vary in the way they clear structures: the bulldozer rams, the dump truck drifts, the lightweight buggy crashes from higher ground, the motorcycle shoots missiles, another truck presses outwards from its sides, and three different robot mechs tumble and stomp from the land and the air. The player must transfer between vehicles and other machinery to solve puzzles. Objectives include transporting timed explosive crates and bridging gaps. The game's puzzles increase in difficulty as the player progresses through its 57 levels.

The world is portrayed from a three-quarters overhead view. The player can adjust the game's viewable perspective with zoom and horizontal panning functions. Pop-up hints will guide the player in the early stages of the game, and other characters audibly encourage the player as each level wears on. The cheery soundtrack increases in tempo as the level's timer runs low. After completing a level, the player can return to explore without a time limit. By destroying any remaining structures, finding secrets, and activating lights throughout the level, the player raises their score and final medal ranking. Activating hidden communication points in each level will unlock various secret levels, where the player completes objectives against the clock, such as completing laps on a circuit or smashing specific objects. The player can compete against a ghost copy of their previous path through a level. Completing every stage unlocks a time attack mode, in which players are awarded medals for clearing the carrier's path in the fastest time. Earning every gold medal in the game will unlock a set of more difficult time attack goals for each level, for which players can earn platinum medals. There are no settings to change the game's difficulty, and the game saves to both the game cartridge itself and external storage.

== Development ==
If you knock down buildings, it will be fun.

— Rare founder Chris Stamper famously gave Blast Corps its raison d'être.

Blast Corps was among Rare's first games for the Nintendo 64 and led a run of seven critically acclaimed Rare titles for the console. The game's production began in 1995. The development team consisted of four recent graduates, though it expanded at times to seven concurrent staff. Martin Wakeley became the game's lead designer. He credited the team's small size for their easy progression from planning to market. Rare founder Chris Stamper was the impetus for the project. He had wanted to make a game about destroying buildings for years prior to Blast Corps's development. The team worked to fit his idea to a gameplay concept and devised a "Constantly Moving Object" conceit that would give the levels a time limit. This idea became the nuclear missile carrier.

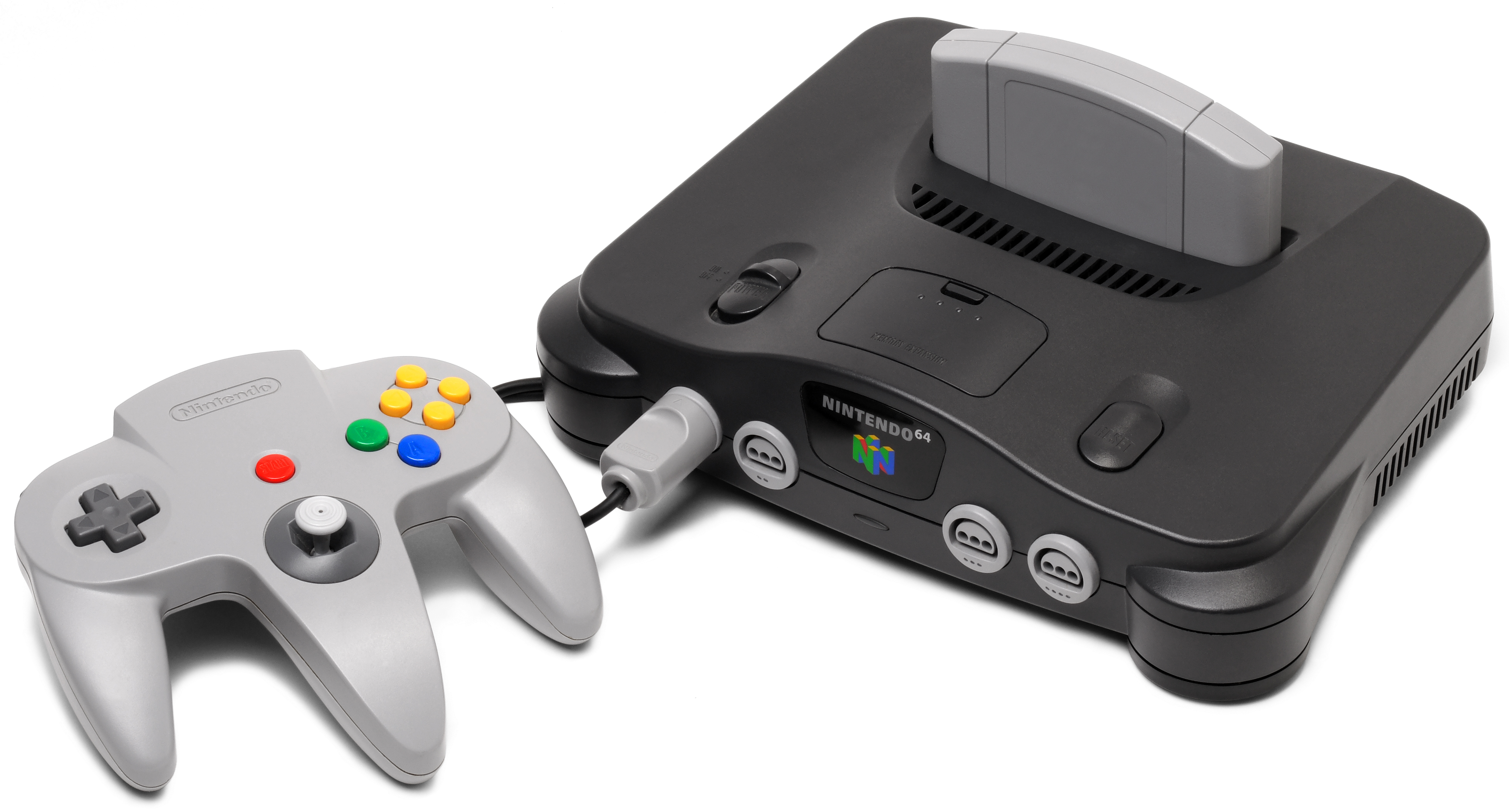
Blast Corps led a set of seven critically acclaimed Rare titles developed for the Nintendo 64.

Retro Gamer credited Wakeley for Blast Corps's idiosyncratic ideas and humor in light of the game's serious premise. For instance, the Mario Kart 64 "power slide" drift mechanics inspired that of Blast Corps's dump truck. Wakeley championed the drift controls against the rest of the team, who found them aggravating. The game's lead artist, Ricky Berwick, had developed the vehicle concepts without consideration for their in-game function, and the vehicles were only later retrofitted to the gameplay. One of the robot vehicles was designed without an arm because the developers had run out of computer memory to store the data and liked the look anyway. Wakeley determined the game's high score "goal medal" objectives, in which players would attempt to better a set completion time on each level. Blast Corps's Japanese and American quality assurance teams later competed to push the levels to their limits, which resulted in the game's platinum level objectives. Wakeley described these platinum challenges as "just insane" and said he could only finish four himself.

Wakeley saw Blast Corps as a puzzle game at its core. He was influenced by the 1994 Donkey Kong, in which the player begins each level with all the tools they need to finish but must learn how to use them. Wakeley said this was Blast Corps's core game mechanic. The Super Mario 64 demo at Nintendo's annual trade show in 1995 helped Wakeley envision how a true 3D world worked with the controller's 3D analog stick. The team's technical accomplishments included character and environment models composed completely of polygons and the absence of distance fog to obscure the draw distance.

Nintendo published Blast Corps for their Nintendo 64. In its 1995 trade show preview, it was originally titled Blast Dozer, a name it retained for its Japanese release. (The team had considered other titles, including "Heavy Duty Heroes", "Blast Radius", and "Power Dozer".) Blast Corps was first released in Japan on March 21, 1997. This was followed by a release in North America three days later. Its PAL release followed on September 5, 1997. The game had been in production for just over a year. To promote the game, a three-part comic detailing the game's story was published in Nintendo Power issues #97–99, later released as a graphic novel by Dark Horse Comics.

== Reception ==
Reception

Aggregate score
Aggregator	Score
Metacritic	90% (12 reviews)

Review scores
Publication	Score
AllGame	4/5
Computer and Video Games	4/5
Electronic Gaming Monthly	9/10, 9/10 8.5/10, 8.5/10
Famitsu	7/10, 8/10, 9/10, 8/10
GameSpot	8.4/10
IGN	9/10
N64 Magazine	88% (JP); 88% (US)
Next Generation	4/5

The game received "universal acclaim", according to review aggregator Metacritic, and "unanimous critical success", according to Retro Gamer. Reviewers highly praised the novelty and variety of Blast Corps's gameplay. Peer Schneider of IGN, in particular, lauded the game's originality. Trent Ward commented in GameSpot that the premise taps into childhood fantasies, while "the unique relationship between the terrain and the vehicles you pilot ensures that Blast Corps will exercise your mind as well as your reflexes".

Reviewers struggled to master the game's controls. GamePro's Slo Mo praised this aspect of the game, saying that even mastering the extreme precision of the steering is fun, and rewards the player with both better gameplay technique and an appreciation for the strong distinction between the game's many vehicles. Schneider likewise overcame his initial concerns to appreciate the complexity of the controls and the differences between the vehicles. He considered the locked camera view restrictive when compared to the unrestricted 3D camera in the game's contemporaries. Schneider thought the game should have been longer, with fewer bonus levels and more main missions, though he did appreciate the pacing, design, and difficulty of the included levels. Slo Mo instead asserted that "Over 60 levels and hidden areas within hidden areas give you your money's worth". A Next Generation critic agreed, asserting that the vast size of the levels and numerous secrets and bonus areas make Blast Corps "one of the few Nintendo 64 games that justifies its exorbitant price tag". Shawn Smith and Sushi-X of Electronic Gaming Monthly (EGM) thought the game was repetitive, as did Computer and Video Games. The latter, though, praised Blast Corps's level design and difficulty progression. Ward had fewer reservations, writing that "basically what you have here is a game with great graphics, great sound, and a great premise. What's even more impressive is that the game doesn't really have any substantial flaws to speak of – unless you want to count lack of a two-player mode, which really isn't fair." Crispin Boyer of EGM wrote that the game's best feature was its "palpable sense of suspense" as the carrier advanced on resistant buildings.

Critics praised the game's graphics and sound. Schneider found the game unpretentious in comparison to video game trends of photorealistic rendering and cartoonish art. He likened the slick vehicle animations and metallic elements to Micro Machines and Rare's R.C. Pro-Am. Schneider praised the game's texture maps, which made the night scenes and houses look realistic, and the canyons breathtaking. He wrote that the game's 3D programming was errorless, and was particularly pleased about the game's lack of fog, usually used to cover developer limitations. EGM echoed Schneider's praise of the deep landscapes, which Boyer called "incredible". Scott McCall (AllGame) praised the game's realistic polygonal models and technical prowess, and Steve Polak (The Weekend Australian) wrote that Blast Corps showcased the console's graphics capabilities. Schneider described the soundtrack as between "70s pop, disaster movie score, and Country Bear Jamboree". He praised the range of engine, tire screeching, and crashing sound effects. Reviewers disliked the country music tracks with jaw harp.

IGN wrote that Blast Corps exemplified qualities of enjoyable Nintendo Entertainment System and arcade games, while EGM considered the game unlike all others. Retro Gamer wrote that the game's combination of puzzles and continuous destruction made the game so unique as to defy genre classification. The magazine described the gameplay concept of returning to explore without a time limit as "a stroke of genius". Retro Gamer thought of Blast Corps as a 3D successor to "nail-biting reaction games" such as Loco-Motion. Computer and Video Games agreed with a reader that Blast Corps was part of a "Destroy" subgenre including games like Desert Strike, Return Fire, and Body Harvest, and Matt Fox of The Video Games Guide put the game in a lineage with Highway Encounter and Lunar Jetman. Slo Mo said it was "like Pilotwings with a kamikaze twist. It's a multifaceted game that melds a slick vehicle sim and a mind-thumping action/strategy challenge with massive destructive force." Schneider said Blast Corps was on par with the quality of Shigeru Miyamoto games and an excellent display of Rare's potential. Next Generation described it as "effectively every Tonka fantasy brought vividly and explosively to life".

EGM named it a runner-up for "Most Original Game of the Year" (behind PaRappa the Rapper) at their 1997 Editors' Choice Awards.

Blast Corps sold close to a million copies. The game sold reasonably well in Japan. Metacritic ranked the title among the top ten games released in 1997. It remained Metacritic's highest ranked 1997 Nintendo 64 game after GoldenEye 007. Blast Corps was selected as Electronic Gaming Monthly's May 1997 Game of the Month and an IGN Editors' Choice. Later the same year, Electronic Gaming Monthly ranked it number 93 on their 100 best console video games of all time, remarking, "C'mon, not only are you driving all the vehicles you thought were mega cool as a kid – you're using 'em to plow through buildings." Four of six Nintendo Power reviewers recommended the game.

== Legacy ==
Wakeley, the game's designer, considered making a sequel as an action combat game, but thought the concepts behind Blast Corps had been fully exhausted. After praising the game in a 2010 Rare retrospective feature, Retro Gamer's writers craved a sequel. The magazine said the title was proof of the company's inventiveness. Steve Ellis, who was a programmer at Rare, thought Blast Corps to be among the company's most underrated games, and though its physics were now dated, he continued to find the game fun enough to revisit regularly.

Rare's Blast Corps began a run of highly praised Nintendo 64 games, including GoldenEye 007, Banjo-Kazooie, Perfect Dark, and Jet Force Gemini. Retro Gamer wrote that Rare had doubled the number of classic Nintendo 64 games and was an important alliance for Nintendo. Microsoft acquired Rare in 2002 for a record price of $377 million, acquiring the rights to the game from Nintendo. After the industry had changed, Blast Corps designer Martin Wakeley reflected a decade after the game's 1997 release. In 2009, Wakeley said, a studio would rarely entrust the scope of a project like Blast Corps to a team of four recent graduates. Blast Corps is included in Rare Replay, a compilation of 30 Rare-developed titles, for the Xbox One on August 4, 2015. The release's bonus features included behind-the-scenes interviews with Blast Corps's developers. Blast Corps was a standout favorite among Rare Replay reviewers. The game was re-released on the Nintendo Classics service in North America and Europe on February 21, 2024, and in Japan on April 24, 2024.

The staff of Nintendo Power (1997) and IGN (2014) both listed Blast Corps in the bottom halves of their top 100 Nintendo games of all time. Official Nintendo Magazine ranked the game 84th on a list of the greatest Nintendo games.
