= Dragon Skulle =

1986 video game

- Box art
- Publisher(s): Ultimate Play the Game
- Designer(s): Dave Thomas; Bob Thomas
- Platform(s): Commodore 64
- Release: UK: January 1986
- Genre(s): Action-adventure
- Mode(s): Single-player

Dragon Skulle is an action-adventure game for the Commodore 64 published by Ultimate Play the Game in January 1986. It is a sequel to The Staff of Karnath, Entombed and Blackwyche, and the final title to feature the aristocrat adventurer Sir Arthur Pendragon. The game was created by brothers Dave and Bob Thomas.

== Gameplay ==
Dragon Skulle is an arcade adventure in isometric perspective pseudo-3D set on the fictional island of Dragon Skulle, where the player must find and destroy the Skull of Souls. The gameplay is more about exploring than puzzle solving when compared with its predecessors.

== Reception ==
Your Commodore's reviewer gave the game a 6/10 value for money rating. They thought that "a lot of the caverns look very similar" and also criticised the "incredibly boring" combat with a fire-breathing dragon.

The game received a 53% rating from Zzap!64, who criticised the game on the basis of poor 3D, weak sound and lack of originality. All three reviewers expressed gratitude that it was the last in the Arthur Pendragon series.

Commodore User's Eugene Lacey was also unimpressed by the game, stating that the Pendragon series of games had been dragged out too long. Although this was said to be the most difficult title in the series due to "hair wrenching puzzles", it was otherwise weaker than its predecessors, with poorer graphics and "appalling" animation of the lead character. Lacey concluded the review by stating that it was "a disappointing conclusion to what was a very good series of games."

Dragon Skulle appeared at number 10 in the weekly Gallup/Microscope charts published in February 1986.
