= Doriath =

Doriath may refer to:

- Doriath (Middle-earth), a realm in the fictional legendarium of author J. R. R. Tolkien
- Doriath (video game), a 1985 action-adventure video game
