= Digger T. Rock =

1990 video game

- European cover art
- Developer: Rare
- Publisher: Milton Bradley Company
- Designer: Tim Stamper; Chris Stamper
- Composer: David Wise
- Platform: NES
- Release: NA: December 1990; EU: 1991
- Genre: Platform
- Mode: Single-player

Digger T. Rock: Legend of the Lost City is a platform game developed by Rare and published by the Milton Bradley Company for the Nintendo Entertainment System. It was first released in North America in December 1990 and in Europe in 1991. The game centres around the miner Digger T. Rock, as he spelunks various caves and catacombs whilst searching for the mythical Lost City.

The game received mixed reviews upon release, with praise directed at its playability but was criticised for its poor graphics and presentation. It was later included in Rare's 2015 Xbox One retrospective compilation, Rare Replay.

== Gameplay ==
The bottom of the screen shows Digger's inventory, score and remaining lives.

The game is divided into eight caverns, which must be explored whilst avoiding death from enemy attacks, cave-ins, and fatal falls. The player-character, Digger T. Rock, can utilise multiple tools such as ladders, shovels, armour, and explosives, which can be used to explore and discover new areas. Monsters such as moles, mosquitoes, and dragons seek to kill the player-character. Digger's only defence is his shovel, which can be used to attack enemies as well as mining stone. The player starts the game with three lives.

The goal in each cavern is to locate both the end of level door and the special pillar which unlocks it. When stepped on, the pillar activates a countdown timer, during which the door is open. Once the timer is active, the player must get to the door before the timer ends and the door re-closes. There are multiple bonus games in between levels where the player can amass more treasure. Later levels include caveman villages where the player can purchase new tools with collected treasure as a currency.

== Development ==
The game was conceived by Tim Stamper, as an update to the arcade game The Pit (1982).

In 2015, Digger T. Rock was included as one of the 30 games in Rare's Xbox One retrospective compilation, Rare Replay (2015).

== Reception ==
Reception

Review scores
Publication	Score
AllGame	3.5/5
GameZone	75/100
Joypad	79%
Mean Machines Sega	89%
Nintendo Power	3.375/5 (Note: Nintendo Power rated Digger T. Rock 3.6/5 for graphics and sound, 3.3/5 for challenge, 3.2/5 for play control, and 3.4/5 for theme and fun.)
Total!	58%
Video Games (DE)	63%
Game Power	82%
NMS (Australia)	89%
Play Time	72%

The game received mixed reviews upon release. Julian Rignall of Mean Machines compared the game to Boulder Dash, stating that Digger T. Rock offers superior gameplay and graphics. Steve Jarrett of Total! criticised the graphics, stating that the dominant rocky landscapes were "too barren". Rignall, on the other hand, stated that the graphics were well-animated and the sprites to be "neatly-defined". However, Rignall criticised the game's presentation, noting that the introduction and options of the game were "sparse". AllGame's Skyler Miller described the game's environments as "simple but well-defined", though felt that the game "falls short in the action department".

The playability and "life-span" of the game also gained mixed views. Rignall praised the game's playability and "lastability", stating that the game is "easy to get into" and was addictive. Regarding its replay value, Rignall asserted that the large number of levels in the game would keep the player occupied and provided an "enjoyable challenge". Jarrett stated the game requires "a lot of patience" and found certain aspects of it frustrating at times, especially the time limit required to progress to the next level. Jarrett also noted the number of levels to be "excessive", and stated that he suspected "players may not want to dig that deep".
