= Slalom (video game) =

1986 video game

- North American NES cover art
- Developer: Rare
- Publisher: Nintendo
- Producer: Tim Stamper; Chris Stamper
- Composer: David Wise
- Platforms: Arcade, Nintendo Entertainment System
- Release: Arcade (VS. Slalom); 17 October 1986; NES: NA: August 1987; EU: 15 October 1987
- Genres: Sports, racing
- Mode: Single-player
- Arcade system: Nintendo VS. System

Slalom, originally released as VS. Slalom, is a skiing sports video game developed by Rare and published by Nintendo for the Nintendo Entertainment System. It was first released in arcades in North America for the Nintendo VS. System in 1986, as with most Nintendo-published games of the era; it was then released for the console in North America in August 1987 and in Europe later that year. The player races in a series of downhill slalom skiing runs while navigating past flags and obstacles before time expires. It was developed by Tim and Chris Stamper and its music was composed by David Wise.

Slalom is the first NES game developed outside Japan (in this case, the United Kingdom), the Stamper brothers' first game released under the Rare brand and the first non-Japanese game to be published by Nintendo. Reviews from the 1980s found Slalom unrealistic, but largely appreciated its graphics and animations, and the original arcade version received praise for its innovative ski controls. In contrast, AllGame's retrospective review called the game poorly made and rushed. The rights to Slalom was acquired by Microsoft through their acquisition of Rare, releasing the game in their 2015 Rare Replay compilation for the Xbox One.

== Gameplay ==
The player heads downhill.

Slalom is a single-player game in which players race downhill in a series of slalom skiing races. There are 24 downhill runs total that are evenly spread across three mountains. Before the game starts, players choose their mountain based on difficulty: Snowy Hill for beginners, Steep Peak for intermediate players, and Mount Nasty for experts. The goal for each run is to reach the finish line within the allotted time. Players must dodge obstacles including trees, flags, snowmen, sledders, and other skiers on their way downhill, or else they will tumble and lose time. With enough momentum, players can jump over these obstacles. Players must ski around flags to maintain their speed. If they ski on the wrong side of the flag, the racer will snowplow and slow down.

Also located on the runs are moguls (bumps) that, when hit, causes the racer to go airborne and slow down slightly when landing. While airborne, players can perform freestyle tricks and earn bonus points, but if the player botches the trick, the racer may tumble and fall, losing time. At the end of each run, final scores are calculated based on the amount of time remaining on the run and points scored from completing freestyle tricks. If the player earns any points, they may race some amount of the next level "solo" (without other skiers onscreen). The points earned in qualifying runs convert to additional seconds on the solo run timer. The high scores on each of the runs are saved in memory until the console is powered off.

== Development ==
Slalom was developed by British video game company Rare by Tim and Chris Stamper. Rare had been looking to develop games for consoles in the wake of rampant computer game piracy in the United Kingdom. They chose the NES for its nascent popularity, though the console had no Western developers, and asked Nintendo for a license. When Nintendo declined, they reverse engineered the console and made a demo, Slalom to show the company. Nintendo was astonished at their effort, and made Rare its first Western developer, beginning a long and close collaboration between Rare and Nintendo of America founder and president Minoru Arakawa.

Slalom was originally released in 1986 in arcades as part of the Nintendo VS. System and is titled VS. Slalom. This features an upright cabinet, a joystick, one jump button, monaural sound, and standard raster graphics. An optional controller upgrade features two physical ski poles and shortened skis that the player stands on to control the skier. The NES version was released by Nintendo in North America in August 1987 and in Europe on 15 October. Slalom was Rare's first video game developed as a new company. It is the Stamper brothers' first video game console release.

The music is the first NES composing job by Rare's video game composer David Wise. In a December 2010 interview, Wise said that he found the NES sound board work challenging. He had to first code the HEX values for each note by hand before converting them into subroutines with a computer. Wise recalled thinking that his first NES projects sounded like doorbells. He was humbled that others continue to remix his tracks.

== Reception ==
Reception

Review scores
Publication	Score
AllGame	1.5/5
Gen4	73%
Power Play	6/10
Tilt	16/20

Upon its original release in arcades, VS. Slalom was reviewed by Clare Edgeley in British magazine Computer and Video Games. She praised the innovative ski controls, but said it lacked "staying power" and considered it an "above average" game without the ski controls.

The NES version of Slalom received preview coverage in early 1987 in the first issue of Nintendo Fun Club News – the predecessor to the company's official monthly magazine Nintendo Power – citing the arcade conversion to the NES. It was featured in the following Summer 1987 issue with a brief overview and expert tips. French magazine Tilt appreciated the game's graphics and sound, but thought its animation did not fare as well. German magazine Aktueller Software Markt highly commended Slalom's animations (particularly its use of scrolling and perspective) and said its sounds were mediocre. The magazine found the game fun, though unrealistic. Power Play and Gen4 similarly praised the animations. Though Gen 4 found the game unrealistic, they appreciated its depiction of speed and the gradual difficulty progression. Power Play liked the level and obstacle graphics. Gen 4 considered the graphics average for Nintendo, and disagreed internally as to whether the game was sufficiently fantastical. Power Play thought the game needed more variety and quickly became monotonous.

AllGame editor Brett Alan Weiss's retrospective review was critical as he called Slalom "a rush job" that did not capture the spirit of skiing. He said that the game was repetitive, too simple, and not fun for adults. Weiss described the graphics as blocky and insipid, the sound as repetitive and derivative. He said that even though it was an early release in the console's lifespan, Slalom was on par with the 1979 Intellivision's capabilities. He recommended Konami's Antarctic Adventure for the ColecoVision instead. UK-based magazine Retro Gamer wrote that the game received little fanfare. The magazine's Stuart Hunt wrote in December 2010, on Rare's 25th anniversary, that the game was "fun but quite simplistic" in its lack of race variety. He said, though, that the game showcased how the company could maximize the system resources of the NES. Slalom was included in Rare Replay, a compilation of 30 Rare games, released on the Xbox One in August 2015, after Microsoft Studios acquired the rights to the game through their purchase of Rare.
