= Cyberun =

- Developers: Disputed; see main article
- Publisher: Ultimate Play the Game
- Platforms: ZX Spectrum, Amstrad CPC (Unreleased), MSX
- Release: 1986
- Genre: Scrolling shooter
- Modes: Single player, multiplayer

Cyberun is a ZX Spectrum video game by Ultimate Play the Game and published by U.S. Gold in 1986. Although not part of the Jetman series, it has similarities to Jetpac in that the player must construct their spaceship from parts, then seek out resources and power-ups.

== Gameplay ==
The ZX Spectrum version at the beginning of gameplay

The player controls a spaceship trapped on a planet inhabited by hostile aliens. The goal is to upgrade the spaceship with parts scattered around the planet and mine a valuable element called "Cybernite". The atmosphere above ground is populated by flying aliens and clouds that drip acid, damaging the ship's shields. The ship requires fuel to fly, and once exhausted will bounce along the ground of the planet unable to climb. A similar enemy ship is also on the planet attempting to mine the Cybernite before the player. Fuel can be replenished by tankers on the planet surface, but damaged shields cannot be repaired. The player must venture into caverns below the surface in order to mine the Cybernite, which can only be done once the ship has been upgraded to include a mining laser. Once sufficient Cybernite has been collected, the player can escape to the next planet in the Zebarema system.

== Reception ==
Reception

Award
Publication	Award
Crash	Crash Smash!

The game was well received by critics, with Crash awarding it a 90% Crash Smash, and Your Spectrum giving it 8/10, describing the game as "a classic pick up the pieces and shoot em up with brilliant graphics".
