= Doriath (video game) =

1985 video game

- Publishers: Rabbit Software; Virgin
- Designer: Dom Ashworth
- Programmers: Ian Gray; Lee Braine
- Artists: Richard Murray; Chris Haines
- Composer: Chris Cox
- Platform: Commodore 64
- Release: EU: 1985
- Genre: Action-adventure
- Mode: Single-player

Doriath is a side-view action-adventure platform game released for the Commodore 64 in 1985.

== Plot ==
The wizard Elidaan the Loremaster descends into the underground labyrinth of Doriath in search of the immortality-granting Coronet of Arien, which was crafted by the Lord of Time, Atelan, and thrown into the abyss after he was spurned by the object of his affection, Fianna.

== Gameplay ==
Doriath is a side-view action-adventure platform game set in the vast underground maze of Doriath, which the player explores in non-linear fashion by controlling the player character, a wizard. Basic movement (running and jumping) is handled with the joystick. Spells are used by holding down on the joystick and pressing the fire button. The ultimate goal of the game is to retrieve the Coronet; in order to do so, the player must find the eight pieces of the Riddlescroll of Wurslea, which, when assembled, will show the Coronet's location. In addition, the player has a wisdom meter which they must increase to 100% by acquiring various useful items hidden throughout the caverns. Many of these items will expand the player's abilities, particularly the amulets that teach the player spells. There are also dragons guarding some of the items that serve as rudimentary boss monsters and require specific spells to defeat. The player can also heal and protect themselves to various effect by drinking several types of potions (created from ingredients found in the labyrinth), as well as pick up various keys to get through different kinds of locked doors. The player selects items in their inventory with the F1 key, and uses them by pressing F7.

== Reception ==
Doriath received mostly positive reviews at the time of its release. Commodore Horizons gave the game 5/8 for graphics, 5/8 for sonics, and 7/8 for gameplay, calling it an "excellent little cheapie", and comparing it to "Sorcery, Staff of Karnath, and any number of similar arcade adventures." It also praised the game for its "true combination of arcade skills – avoiding guards and hazards – and adventure strategies and mapping." However, the magazine considered the game's graphics to be merely adequate, and, judging it among budget titles, felt it inferior overall to Blackwyche. Laurie Sampson of Commodore User gave it 3/6 for graphics, 3/6 for sound, 4/6 toughness, 4/6 for staying power, and 4/6 for value, saying it was "[s]plit fairly and squarely between adventure and arcade", and noting that the game's audiovisual qualities were above average for a budget title; he also compared it to Sorcery in its focus on acquiring spells and items to overcome enemies and obstacles. He concluded that the Doriath was "[a] good helping of entertainment for those itching to get lost in a labyrinth." Zzap!'s two reviewers were somewhat split; Gary Penn called it "[a] fairly competent release and certainly a lot better than the other Rabbit/Virgin game, Zyto", but found the wizard's jumping controls awkward and the game as a whole "overpriced for what it offers". Julian Rignall, on the other hand, called it "a pretty gruesome game", saying that the graphics were "very poor" and "badly animated", and also found the music "grating". He also said "[t]he instructions are very poor, with practically no indication of what you're supposed to do", concluding that publisher Rabbit Software would have to "get their act together" in the future. The magazine gave the game a mediocre overall score of 47%, concluding that it was "[n]ot one of the better arcade adventures available but even so there's a lot worse."

A retrospective article from Retro Gamer said it is still "tremendous fun to explore & track down the spell amulets needed to kill the various types of monster that range from snakes to dragons and kraken" but noted a long-standing rumor (apparently unconfirmed) that the game is "impossible to fully complete due to a missing amulet." In another retrospective, Kotaku also looked back on the game fondly, likening it to Metroid. Doriath Dungeon describes the game in great detail, including confirming that there is an ending, achievable despite the missing amulet.
