= Rare Replay =

2015 video game compilation

- Developer: Rare
- Publisher: Microsoft Studios
- Producer: Adam Park
- Designer: Paul Collins
- Artists: Peter Hentze; Paul Cartwright
- Composer: Robin Beanland (Note: Beanland composed and arranged the opening theme, as well as arranging each game's theme music for use in the menus. Rich Aitken assisted with the menu arrangements.)
- Platform: Xbox One
- Release: August 4, 2015
- Genre: Various
- Modes: Single-player, multiplayer

Rare Replay is a 2015 compilation of 30 video games from the 30-year history of developers Rare and its predecessor, Ultimate Play the Game. The emulated games span multiple genres and consoles—from the ZX Spectrum in 1983 to the Xbox 360 in 2008—and retain the features and errors of their original releases with minimal edits. The compilation adds cheats to make the older games easier and a Snapshots mode of specific challenges culled from parts of the games. Player progress is rewarded with behind-the-scenes footage and interviews about Rare's major and unreleased games.

The compilation was one of several ideas Rare considered to celebrate its 30th anniversary. Inspired by fans, upcoming Xbox One backward compatibility features, and a desire to link Rare's past and future, the company sorted through 120 games to choose those that best represented its oeuvre. It prioritized games with characters and environments original to the company. Rare incorporated four hardware emulators in the package, and worked with its parent company, Microsoft, to use its then-unannounced Xbox 360 emulation. Rare Replay released worldwide as an Xbox One exclusive on August 4, 2015.

Rare Replay's reviews were generally favorable. Critics appreciated the package's design and craft and called the release a new pinnacle for compilation releases. They commended its "rewind" and Snapshot features, but criticized technical issues in the Xbox 360 emulation and game installation. Among its games, reviewers preferred Rare's Nintendo 64 games, especially Blast Corps, and disliked Perfect Dark Zero, Grabbed by the Ghoulies, and the Spectrum games. Some outlets lamented the absence, due to licensing issues, of the Donkey Kong Country series and GoldenEye 007, while others thought the package was fine without them. Critics deemed the archival game content and developer interviews as among the compilation's best features, but were upset to see the content hidden behind time-consuming in-game challenges. Rare Replay became Rare's first United Kingdom all-formats charts bestseller since Banjo-Kazooie in 1998.

== Gameplay ==
Included games by release year of original version Titles in bold print are Xbox 360 games running under Xbox One backwards compatibility.
| 1983 | Jetpac (ZXS) |
| 1983 | Lunar Jetman (ZXS) |
| 1983 | Atic Atac (ZXS) |
| 1984 | Sabre Wulf (ZXS) |
| 1984 | Underwurlde (ZXS) |
| 1984 | Knight Lore (ZXS) |
| 1985 | Gunfright (ZXS) |
| 1986 | Slalom (NES) |
1987
| 1988 | R.C. Pro-Am (NES) |
| 1989 | Cobra Triangle |
| 1990 | Snake Rattle 'n' Roll (NES) |
| 1990 | Solar Jetman (NES) |
| 1990 | Digger T. Rock |
| 1991 | Battletoads (NES) |
| 1992 | R.C. Pro-Am II |
1993
| 1994 | Battletoads Arcade |
1995
| 1996 | Killer Instinct Gold |
| 1997 | Blast Corps |
| 1998 | **Banjo-Kazooie** |
| 1999 | Jet Force Gemini |
| 2000 | **Perfect Dark** |
| 2000 | **Banjo-Tooie** |
| 2001 | Conker's Bad Fur Day |
2002
| 2003 | Grabbed by the Ghoulies |
2004
| 2005 | **Kameo** |
| 2005 | **Perfect Dark Zero** |
| 2006 | **Viva Piñata** |
| 2007 | **Jetpac Refuelled** |
| 2008 | **Viva Piñata: Trouble in Paradise** |
| 2008 | **Banjo-Kazooie: Nuts & Bolts** |

Rare Replay is a compilation of 30 games developed by Rare and its predecessor, Ultimate Play the Game, over their 30-year history across platforms from the ZX Spectrum to the Xbox 360 (1983–2008), up until Rare's Kinect Sports series. The 30 games span multiple genres, including fighting, first-person shooter, simulation, platforming, racing, and skiing. The compilation opens with a musical number featuring Rare characters. Each game has a landing page with a variation on its theme music. While the core gameplay remains unedited, Rare added extra features to the older releases. The player can toggle the visual appearance of scanlines and "rewind" up to ten seconds of gameplay in pre-Nintendo 64 games. The older games can be saved at will and autosave progress upon the player's exit. Rare also added an infinite lives cheat setting for some older games and fixed a game-breaking bug in Battletoads. The "Snapshots" feature presents small segments of the older games as challenges for the player, such as collecting a target number of points within a time limit in a set scenario, similar in function to the NES Remix series. Some Snapshots are connected sequentially as a playlist.

The ZX Spectrum emulation retains the technical idiosyncrasies of the original hardware. For instance, their graphics fluctuate in render speed depending on the number of items the computer has to process on-screen. The Nintendo 64 emulation upgrades the games' polygon rendering and frame rate. The nine Xbox 360 releases install directly to the Xbox One dashboard separately from the Rare Replay compilation and require online activation before they can be played offline. The Xbox 360 games share player saved game and Achievement progress between the consoles via Xbox Live's cloud sync features. Rare Replay uses the prior Xbox 360 versions of Banjo-Kazooie, Banjo-Tooie, and Perfect Dark rather than emulating their originals. However, Rare chose to emulate the original Conker's Bad Fur Day rather than using its Xbox remake Conker: Live and Reloaded (2005). Grabbed by the Ghoulies runs natively on the Xbox One, as a port upgraded its display resolution and frame rate. Rare Replay retains the local and online multiplayer modes of the original games, and includes all of their downloadable content add-ons. Games developed by Rare that were not their intellectual property, such as the Donkey Kong Country series and GoldenEye 007, were not included in the compilation due to licensing issues, although the latter was provided to owners of the digital version of Rare Replay free of charge in January 2023. Some games also received minor edits to reflect Microsoft's ownership of Rare, such as the removal of Nintendo logos and omission of a music track from Blast Corps that originated in Donkey Kong Land.

A bonus feature section, "Rare Revealed", contains over an hour of behind-the-scenes footage focusing on Rare's major and unreleased games. The player completes in-game challenges to collect stamps, which increase the player's rank and unlock the bonus features; to collect all the stamps, the player has to finish every game and Snapshot. The compilation automatically grants stamps for prior progress in the package's Xbox 360 games. Current and former Rare employees, such as Grant Kirkhope, feature in the documentary clips, though studio founders Tim and Chris Stamper do not appear. "Rare Revealed" unveils gameplay footage from several unreleased games: for example, in the open world adventure game Black Widow, the player controls a spider-like robot equipped with missiles. The spider was expected to be recycled in Kameo 2, an unreleased sequel to Kameo which was designed with a darker tone than the original. Rare also worked on The Fast and the Furriest, a spiritual successor to Diddy Kong Racing with vehicle customization and track alterations. The company's other planned intellectual properties included the survival game prototype Sundown and the airplane-based Tailwind. Other "Rare Revealed" videos include unused music tracks; concept art galleries; and trivia behind some game design decisions such as Blast Corps' character design, the fate of Banjo-Kazooie's Stop 'n' Swop features, and audio overrides built into Killer Instinct. Additional "Rare Revealed" featurettes not present in Rare Replay have been released since the game's launch via the company's official YouTube channel.

== Development ==
Rare began work on Rare Replay in October 2014 as a 30th anniversary celebration under the codename "Pearl", named after the traditional theme of 30th anniversary gifts. The company wanted to do something unique for what they considered a rare milestone in the video game industry and also to celebrate creative director Gregg Mayles's 25th year working at the company. Rare was also influenced by community requests to bring their catalogue to Xbox One, and by the Microsoft backward-compatibility team's progress on the feature. The compilation was one of several celebration ideas, but once it was chosen, the "30 years" theme led to the 30 game limit and US$30 price point. In the early planning stages, the studio initially settled on the tentative title Rare: Ultimate Collection, a nod to their predecessor, Ultimate Play the Game. As reflective of the company's character and celebratory theme, Rare chose a papercraft art style and theatrical stage setting for the compilation. The chosen art style and use of 2D artwork also allowed the development team to more quickly create and implement new assets within the limited development time frame. Rare Replay became part of Rare's plan to simultaneously celebrate its past and introduce its future with a logo redesign, new website, and announcement of their upcoming game, Sea of Thieves.

To select the final 30 games, Rare sorted through 120 games in their catalog. They rated each for fitness and prioritized those that featured characters and environments original to the company, choosing to exclude those based on licensed intellectual properties. Secondarily, Rare considered whether licenses were available and whether a game remained fun and playable by modern standards. They wanted a wide and representative sample of "popular games that would hit that nostalgic beat that everyone likes". Deciding which versions of some of their most popular games to include also became a topic of debate among the team. Rare decided to include the updated Xbox 360 re-releases of Banjo-Kazooie, Banjo-Tooie, and Perfect Dark instead of the Nintendo 64 originals, as the developers realized the various quality-of-life improvements in these remasters were too valuable even to the purists on their staff. Conversely, they chose the Nintendo 64 version of Conker's Bad Fur Day over its Xbox remake, Conker: Live & Reloaded, which they felt had strayed too far from the original due to being less lenient on censorship. While Rare Replay's designers made the final call, other Rare employees and veterans gave input and recollected old game development stories. The developers briefly considered including playable prototypes of unreleased Rare games such as Black Widow and Kameo 2 as part of the collection, but the work required to do so made this infeasible given the limited development time frame, leading them to produce "Rare Revealed" videos about the unfinished games instead. Interviews with current and former Rare staff members for the "Rare Revealed" featurettes took place over the course of several months in 2015. Several interview segments and "Rare Revealed" videos were omitted from the game due to time and disc space constraints; these were later released via the company's official YouTube channel. An additional "Rare Revealed" video focused on the making of GoldenEye 007 was planned, but was left unreleased until being leaked in 2019.

Unlike the usual product development cycle, which grows a concept into a final product, most of the development work in Rare Replay was in converging 30 games across six platforms onto one disc. The engineering challenge lay in the quantity of games and platforms being emulated rather than the emulation effort itself. Rare worked in close collaboration with Microsoft, who were secretly developing the Xbox One's backward-compatibility features, which Rare ultimately used in Rare Replay. The Microsoft team helped prepare Rare's nine Xbox 360 games for the release. Their discontinued online services were not restored for the compilation. Work on emulating the ZX Spectrum games was led by Gavin Thomas, a Microsoft engineer who had developed his own Spectrum emulator in his free time a few years prior. Code Mystics, who had previously ported Rare's Killer Instinct and Killer Instinct 2 to Xbox One, assisted with emulation efforts for the Nintendo Entertainment System, arcade, and Nintendo 64 games. On Rare Replay's design, lead designer Paul Collins added that the Snapshot challenges were built to encourage players to sample all of the games, and that the rewind feature was to help all players finish the games without quitting in frustration. The compilation's opening musical number was a compromise from the original vision: a musical history of the company's oeuvre, as told through small musical introductions to each Snapshot. The final opening was intended to evoke players' memories of Rare properties, and includes several Easter eggs.

Rare Replay was announced during the Microsoft press conference at the June 2015 Electronic Entertainment Expo. The reveal was leaked in the hours prior to the show. The compilation was released as an Xbox One exclusive worldwide on August 4, 2015. There are no plans for a Windows 10 release or downloadable content additions. While Rare's founders, the Stamper brothers, were not interviewed in the bonus features, Tim Stamper appeared in a Develop interview set to coincide with the compilation's release. Rare also added a tie-in wherein Rare Replay owners unlocked the Battletoads character Rash as a playable character in the 2013 fighting game Killer Instinct during a limited test period prior to the character's public release the following year. On June 25, 2019, Rare Replay became part of Xbox Game Pass and all of the Xbox 360 games excluding Jetpac Refuelled were enhanced to run at native 4K resolution on Xbox One X. On January 27, 2023, GoldenEye 007 was re-released on Game Pass for Xbox One and Xbox Series X/S, with digital owners of Rare Replay receiving the game for free.

== Reception ==
Reception

Aggregate scores
| Aggregator | Score |
|---|---|
| Metacritic | 84/100 |
| OpenCritic | 96% recommend |

Review scores
| Publication | Score |
|---|---|
| Eurogamer | Essential |
| Game Informer | 8.75/10 |
| IGN | 9.0/10 |
| Polygon | 8/10 |
| USgamer | 4.5/5 |
| Wired UK | 9/10 |

Rare Replay received "generally favorable" reviews, according to review aggregator website Metacritic. Fellow review aggregator OpenCritic assessed that the compilation received "mighty" approval, being recommended by 96% of critics. It reached the top of the United Kingdom all-format games sales charts—the first Xbox One exclusive to do so and Rare's first since Banjo-Kazooie in 1998. Rare Replay was also the first top-ranked budget game since Wii Fit Plus (2009) before it fell to sixth place the next week. Rare Replay was the sixth best selling game in North America for August 2015. The compilation had earlier been Amazon.com's most preordered game of the 2015 Electronic Entertainment Expo. Reviewers liked its value proposition and low price. Many of the compilation's games already had long-established legacies, such that gamers who experienced the originals in their heyday—the target audience—were unlikely to be swayed by critical reviews of the selections.

Reviewers noted the quality and craft that went into the compilation's design. Jaz Rignall (USgamer) was impressed by the compilation's presentation and balance between frills and efficiency, and Dan Whitehead (Eurogamer) felt that the theatrical theme fit Rare's character. Reviewers considered Rare Replay a high-water mark for video game compilations—Kotaku called it the best since Valve's The Orange Box. On the other hand, Jeremy Parish (USgamer) found the contemporaneous Mega Man Legacy Collection's Criterion Collection-style presentation to be a more authentic appreciation of its original material. Chris Plante (The Verge) saw Rare Replay's slight hardware improvements and added touches as a viable model for putting retrogames back on the market and slowing the tide of unlicensed downloads.

Much of the commentary on the compilation focused on Rare's choice of selections and concluded that players new and old would find enough new treasures to outweigh the duds. Reviewer favorites included Blast Corps, Banjo-Kazooie: Nuts & Bolts, the Viva Piñata games, and the Nintendo 64 titles (especially Banjo-Kazooie, Conker, and Perfect Dark). Among the least favorites were Perfect Dark Zero, Grabbed by the Ghoulies, and the early Spectrum games, which reviewers felt had aged the worst. Ars Technica, however, defended the Spectrum games for showing an experimental and unrefined side of Rare. Many critics regretted the implacable licensing problems that led to the exclusion of what they considered the company's best games—Donkey Kong Country, GoldenEye 007, and Diddy Kong Racing—while others felt that the package was fine without them. Also omitted were Rare's Kinect Sports series, Nintendo franchise releases, Super Nintendo-era games, and "Mario Kart clones". These timeline gaps precluded, for instance, the player from understanding Conker as an edgy response to the "cutesy" characters of preceding Nintendo games. Despite these absences, Ars Technica's critic was impressed by Microsoft's ability to license from publishers including Tradewest, Nintendo, Milton Bradley, and Electronic Arts. Eurogamer's reviewer was surprised by Rare's consistent style across the selections, and compared the company's legacy to that of Cosgrove Hall Films. The Kotaku reviewer saw Rare Replay as "image rehabilitation" that would hopefully mark Rare's return to making "deep and daring games" in line with their historical reputation.

Reviewers felt that the archival game content and developer interviews were among Rare Replay's best features. Some were frustrated that the features were locked behind time-consuming in-game challenges. Sam Machkovech (Ars Technica) found himself stuck not even halfway through the stamp card progress after finishing the easiest achievements. This made the unreleased game footage particularly hard to access. Stephen Totilo (Kotaku) similarly became uninterested in finishing the stamp collection. He called the stamps the package's "sickest joke" in consideration of Rare's reputation for collectible-heavy games. Some reviewers found the developer content more important than individual games. Polygon's reviewer called the compilation "an essential piece of gaming history", while Kotaku's critic noted that the features lacked a straightforward history of the company and hid Rare's significant, former ties with Nintendo. Whitehead (Eurogamer) wondered why Mire Mare and other early games were ignored in the bonus content. Machkovech (Ars Technica) found Rare Replay to be as much a "memorial" as an anthology since Rare had become "a shadow of its former self". He noted how the compilation's final games coincide with the Stamper brothers' exit from the company. Reviewers felt that the Stampers, Rare's founders, were a conspicuous absence from the compilation and Jaz Rignall figured that the compilation's stamps feature was a reference to the brothers.

Reviewers praised the feature by which players could "rewind" time and reattempt difficult sections of ZX Spectrum and Nintendo Entertainment System games, which were known for their difficulty, especially in the notoriously challenging Battletoads. Kotaku figured that Rare added cheats to make the esoteric and "crushingly tough" Spectrum games tolerable, and the Ars Technica review wished that this "rewind" feature had been extended to the Nintendo 64 games. Critics liked the Snapshot challenges and Polygon reported that they were crucial for learning basic game mechanics, though less accessible than those of NES Remix. Reviewers complained that the Spectrum game controls were difficult to decipher. The Ars Technica reviewer thought that the compilation did a poor job of explaining each game's controls, and wondered why Rare did not include introductory or how-to videos. Instead, he turned to YouTube videos and external FAQs before playing each game. Eurogamer and Ars Technica disagreed on the virtues of having the Spectrum emulator replicate the graphical glitches of the original console. Jaz Rignall of USgamer appreciated the added option to save game progress at any time for the Spectrum games, and wrote that the collection will remind players how difficult games used to be.

Rare Replay's Nintendo 64 emulation pleased critics. Ars Technica wrote that the polygonal upgrades compensated for the "blurry" and "pixelated" source material, though the Nintendo 64 multiplayer modes lacked the frame rate upgrades that their single-player modes received. Kotaku noted that the Xbox One had more Nintendo 64 re-releases than Nintendo's Wii U Virtual Console at the time. Its reviewer found the in-game Xbox One button prompts to be "delightful anachronisms". Ars Technica's reviewer commended Rare's choice of the Nintendo 64 version of Conker's Bad Fur Day over its updated but censored Xbox re-release. Initial reviews found Jet Force Gemini unplayable without dual thumbstick controls, which were later added. While Machkovech (Ars Technica) considered Rare's Microsoft games to the weakest of the lot, Whitehead (Eurogamer) found them even more enjoyable in the context of Rare Replay. Reviewers noted frame rate and technical issues in the Xbox 360 emulation and did not like its separation from the rest of the compilation. Kollar (Polygon) called the Xbox 360 game installation process needlessly complex, and Marty Sliva (IGN) did not like how the Xbox 360 startup sequence interrupted the compilation's cohesion. He added that the emulated Xbox 360 experience was subpar compared to the unemulated experience.
