= Entombed (video game) =

1985 video game

- Game cover
- Publisher: Ultimate Play the Game
- Designers: Dave Thomas; Bob Thomas
- Platform: Commodore 64
- Release: UK: 1985; NA: 1985
- Genre: Action-adventure
- Mode: Single player

Entombed is an action-adventure video game published by Ultimate Play the Game for the Commodore 64 in 1985. It is the second instalment of the Pendragon series and is a sequel to The Staff of Karnath. The game features series protagonist and aristocrat adventurer, Sir Arthur Pendragon, as he attempts to escape an ancient Egyptian tomb before all oxygen runs out. As with its predecessor, Entombed is presented in an isometric format.

The game was created and designed by brothers Dave and Bob Thomas, with Ultimate founders Tim and Chris Stamper otherwise being uninvolved in development. Entombed took considerably longer to develop due to the re-programming of its game engine. It received positive reviews from critics upon release, with praise being directed at its playability and graphics. It was followed by a sequel, Blackwyche, which was released later in the year.

== Gameplay ==
A still image from the game. The interface displays the time, oxygen remaining and current weapon

The game is presented in an isometric format and is set inside an ancient Egyptian tomb. Sir Arthur Pendragon's main objective is to escape the tomb, the Great Sphinx, before all oxygen runs out. To achieve this end, the player must navigate a series of chambers linked by corridors, solve logic puzzles and deal with hostile enemies by either avoiding or fighting them. The tomb has seven floors. Pendragon's only form of defence is his whip, which he can utilise to defend himself from enemies. The player also has access to a torch, which will allow them to see in certain pitch-black areas of the tomb.

Unlike other games from the Pendragon series, Entombed features no collectable items required to finish the game. The player-character has a life bar, which will deplete every time he makes contact with an enemy. To replenish life, the player must kill crows which will spawn in rooms at various times, and upon its death the crow will drop an Ankh symbol, the ancient Egyptian "Symbol of Life". If the player completely runs out of life or if all the oxygen runs out from the tomb, then the game will end.

== Development and release ==
Entombed took the longest to create as I decided to re-code the original Karnath engine to allow a much bigger area to explore.

— Dave Thomas in an interview with Retro Gamer in March 2008

The Pendragon series and The Staff of Karnath were created by brothers Dave and Robert "Bob" Thomas, rather than Ultimate founders Tim and Chris Stamper. Dave Thomas began his career in 1983 when he began producing games for the Atari 400, including moderate-sellers such as Warlok, which won him £5,000 in a competition from Calisto Software. Although he later began working for the company in producing video games, he quit due to the strain of his daily 68 miles (109 km) commute. Shortly after quitting Calisto Software, Dave Thomas started work on The Staff of Karnath. Bob Thomas was a trained technical illustrator for the Ministry of Defence and had experience with designing interiors for the Royal Navy, which later aided to the military-themed visuals of the Pendragon series. As with all games in the Pendragon series, Entombed was programmed by Dave Thomas, whereas the graphics were designed by Bob Thomas. Dave Thomas admitted in a March 2008 interview that the name of the series protagonist, "Sir Arthur Pendragon", was copied from the character of the Black Prince Pendragon from the Jack the Giant Killer stories. According to Dave Thomas, Entombed had the longest development cycle due to the expansion of the previous engine.

== Reception ==
Reception

Review scores
Publication	Score
Computer and Video Games	8.0/10
Computer Gamer	3/5
Popular Computing Weekly	5/5
Zzap!64	93/100

Award
Publication	Award
Zzap!64 Game of the Month	Gold Medal

The game received positive reviews upon release. John Cook of Popular Computing Weekly praised the graphics, heralding them as "colourful" and the detail of the stages as "beautiful". Julian Rignall of Zzap!64 similarly praised the presentation of the game, expressing surprise on the size and graphical advancements from its predecessor. A reviewer of Computer and Video Games praised the graphics as "excellent", whilst noting the resemblance to Indiana Jones. A reviewer of Computer Gamer similarly cited the graphics as "excellent", stating that it was "what he expected from an Ultimate game". However, they criticised the overall gameplay, stating it to be "very boring" especially in the early stages of the game where the player was "wandering through passages being slowly smegged!"

Cook praised the game's puzzle sections, comparing them more favourably than those of its predecessor, and summarised that the game was "definitely a must for any adventurer's collection". Rignall stated that the puzzles "have logical and sometimes spectacular solutions" and similarly praised them more favourably than those in The Staff of Karnath. However, Rignall criticised the sprites of the game, asserting that they were "large and crude".
