= Imhotep (video game) =

1985 video game

- Developer: Ultimate Play the Game
- Publisher: Ultimate Play the Game
- Designer: Manuel Caballero
- Platform: Commodore 64
- Release: UK: 15 October 1985
- Genre: Scrolling shooter
- Mode: Single-player

Imhotep is a horizontally scrolling shooter for the Commodore 64 published in the United Kingdom by Ultimate Play the Game on 15 October 1985. The game is set in Ancient Egypt and revolves around Imhotep the Wise and his mission to stop the famine plaguing the kingdom by obtaining sacred books. Imhotep was developed by Spaniard Manuel Caballero over a period of ten months during his gap year.

== Gameplay ==

Imhotep is a scrolling shooter similar to Defender. In the game the title character flies on a mystic bird which uses power bolts to shoot down enemies. The player must also avoid the stones flung by catapults.

== Reception ==
The game received overwhelmingly negative reviews upon release, with many critics citing it as the worst game published by Ultimate. John Reed from Zzap!64 was convinced that it would damage Ultimate's reputation as one of Britain's leading software development houses.

It was well received by Your Commodore's reviewer, who said that it was "an infuriatingly addictive game."
