= Atic Atac =

1983 video game

- ZX Spectrum cover art
- Developer: Ultimate Play the Game
- Publisher: Ultimate Play the Game
- Designer: Tim and Chris Stamper
- Platforms: ZX Spectrum, BBC Micro
- Release: ZX Spectrum: UK: 1983; BBC Micro: UK: 1985
- Genres: Action-adventure, maze
- Mode: Single-player

Atic Atac is an action-adventure video game developed and published by Ultimate Play the Game, released for the ZX Spectrum in 1983 and the BBC Micro in 1985. The game takes place within a castle in which the player must seek out the "Golden Key of ACG" (Note: "ACG" is an acronym for Ashby Computers and Graphics, the parent company of Ultimate Play the Game) by unlocking doors and avoiding enemies. It was Ultimate's second game to require 48K of RAM; most of their previous games for the Spectrum ran on unexpanded 16K models.

The game was written by Tim Stamper and its graphics were designed by brother Chris Stamper. Atic Atac received praise from critics upon release, mostly for its graphics and gameplay. It was later included in the 2015 release by Rare on the Xbox One retrospective compilation, Rare Replay. The game served as inspiration for the critically acclaimed adventure game show Knightmare.

== Gameplay ==
A screenshot from the game, showing a room surrounded by locked doors, and the roast chicken energy meter on the right.

The game is presented in a top-down perspective (albeit with sideways-on action) and is set inside a complex, labyrinthine castle with multiple floors (accessed by staircases and timed trapdoors) and secret passages. The player has been trapped inside and needs to collect three pieces of the "Golden Key of ACG" in order to escape. They can choose from three different characters; a Wizard, Knight or Serf. Each character has different ground friction, a different weapon to kill common enemies and access to a secret passage unique to them, meaning that navigating the castle is different for each one.

There are a number of items scattered around the castle, of which the player may carry up to three at a time. Some of these are always in the same place at the start of the game, whereas others are distributed randomly. Items include differently-coloured keys which will unlock their respective doors, the three pieces of the ACG key, and other items that affect certain enemies or are mere red herrings. Common enemies appear in each room upon entering and will attack the player on sight. Collision with these enemies destroys them but drains a portion of the player's health. There are also stationary poisonous fungi which will drain health constantly if the player is in contact with them, and enemies that require special items in order to either distract, repel or kill them, otherwise they remain in the room, invulnerable to conventional attacks, and rapidly drain the player's health if touched.

The player has three lives upon starting the game, and should they die a gravestone will appear at their location and stay in place for the remainder of the current game. Health can be replenished by collecting food scattered throughout the castle, however it will constantly drop the more the player moves, thus the player may eventually lose a life from starvation if they have not escaped the castle in time.

== Development ==
Ashby Computers and Graphics was founded by brothers Tim and Chris Stamper, along with Tim's wife, Carol, from their headquarters in Ashby-de-la-Zouch in 1982. Under the trading name of Ultimate Play the Game, they began producing multiple video games for the ZX Spectrum throughout the early 1980s. Prior to founding Ultimate, the Stamper brothers had backgrounds in designing arcade machines, but no marketing experience in the video game sector.

The operations of Ultimate were secretive and the Stamper brothers rarely gave interviews. Computer and Video Games noted that during development of Atic Atac, staff would work in "separate teams" to ensure quality control; one team would work on graphics whilst the other would oversee gameplay or sound. The Stamper brothers worked seven days a week with little sleep in order to devote more time into developing video games, and would frequently re-use the same mechanics of their earlier games in newer ZX Spectrum games.

== Reception and legacy ==
Reception

Review scores
Publication	Score
Crash	92%
Computer and Video Games	9/10
Eurogamer	8/10

Atic Atac entered the MRIB Top 30 software charts at number 5 in November 1983, taking the number 1 position from Valhalla the following fortnight.

The game received a positive critical reception upon release. Micro Adventurer mainly praised Ultimate's capabilities of developing high quality games, saying that Atic Atac was "bound to fix their name firmly into the minds of adventurers", further recommending the game "without reservation". Crash enjoyed the game's colourful graphics, heralding the detail and objects of the game to be "marvellous". However, they criticised the difficult joystick control and vague instructions, adding that the entire game is a "learning experience". Computer and Video Games stated that the game was "the best yet from Ultimate", and later in 1984 described it as "the favourite arcade adventure amongst computer gamesters". Personal Computer Games wrote that it was "another blockbuster game", while Sinclair User praised both the depth of plot and the advanced graphics, citing them both as "superb".

In 1991, Atic Atac was ranked as the 79th best ZX Spectrum game of all time by Your Sinclair, and was voted the 8th best game of all time by the readers of Retro Gamer magazine for an article that was scheduled to be in a special Your Sinclair Tribute issue. In 2007, Eurogamer described it as a prime example of "what passion can do when properly digitised". In 2015, the game was included in Rare Replay, a collection of 30 Rare-designed games released for the Xbox One gaming console.

The game was a major inspiration for the critically acclaimed CITV game show Knightmare, with producer Tim Child realising that if a ZX Spectrum could run a compelling adventure game, then a television programme with pre-rendered graphics could revolutionise the genre. Sabre Wulf, which was released for the ZX Spectrum by Ultimate Play the Game later in 1984, was noted for having similar gameplay to Atic Atac, including its similar themes of a continuous maze. In a retrospective interview with Retro Gamer, Rare designer Gregg Mayles asserted that their 2003 game Grabbed by the Ghoulies was not inspired by Atic Atac, despite their similar themes of a haunted mansion.
