= Jet Force Gemini =

1999 video game

- North American box art
- Developer: Rare
- Publisher: Rare
- Directors: Lee Schuneman; Paul Mountain
- Producer: Chris Stamper
- Designer: Martin Wakeley
- Composers: Robin Beanland; Graeme Norgate; Alistair Lindsay
- Platform: Nintendo 64
- Release: NA: October 11, 1999; EU: October 29, 1999
- Genres: Third-person shooter, platform
- Modes: Single-player, multiplayer

Jet Force Gemini is a 1999 third-person shooter game developed and published by Rare for the Nintendo 64. The game follows the story of three members of a galactic law enforcement team as they try to stop a horde of drones led by an insectoid called Mizar. It features a single-player mode where the player must explore a galaxy and save Tribals, a race of survivors who have been enslaved and imprisoned by Mizar, and places strong emphasis on shooting large numbers of enemies while dodging their attacks. The game includes a multiplayer mode where two to four players can compete in traditional deathmatch games.

Inspired by 80s arcade games and more recent titles of the time, such as Super Metroid and Super Mario 64, Jet Force Gemini blends elements of both shoot 'em up and action-adventure games. Works such as Aliens, Stargate and Battle of the Planets were major influences. The game received generally positive reviews from critics. Praise was given to its detailed graphics and life-span, while criticism was targeted at its confusing controls and insistence on having to save every Tribal to fully complete the game. In 2015, Jet Force Gemini was included as part of the Rare Replay video game compilation for Xbox One. The game was re-released via the Nintendo Classics service in 2023.

== Gameplay ==
While in aiming mode, the player character is translucent and a crosshair is visible. Health and ammunition information is displayed on the left side of the screen.

Jet Force Gemini is a third-person shooter with shoot 'em up and action-adventure elements, in which the player controls the player character from a third-person perspective in a 3D environment. The game places strong emphasis on shooting large numbers of enemies while dodging their attacks. Weapons have no magazine restrictions and include grenades, a pistol, a machine gun, a sniper rifle, a flamethrower, and rocket launchers, among others. Although much of the game is spent in battle, the player has the ability to jump, hang from ledges, swim, and fly using jet packs, when needed. In combat, the player is free to set on a manual aiming system with the targeting camera fixed behind the character's head. When using this technique, a crosshair appears on screen and the player character becomes translucent so that players can aim and shoot with finesse. By contrast, when walking around, the game plays similar to a 3D platformer.

In the game's single-player mode, the player must explore a galaxy that is composed of 15 nonlinear worlds. Each world is composed of a series of stages with areas interconnected by different types of doors. Most doors open automatically, but some require a special action to be unlocked. For example, some doors require the player to defeat all the enemies in the area, while others may require a specific key. Although the player has a certain amount of health which decreases when attacked by enemies, health-recovery gems and ammunition crates can be collected throughout the world to increase the player's resources. Power-ups can be found to expand the player's health and ammunition capacity.

While progressing, the player can take control of three different characters: Juno, Vela, and Lupus. Each character has a special ability that allows them to uncover areas which the other characters cannot reach. Juno can walk through magma safely, Vela can swim underwater indefinitely, and Lupus can hover for a short period of time. Therefore, choosing the right character for the right stage is critical in order to complete the game. Initially, the game forces the player to use the three characters individually until they reach a meeting point. Once they reach the meeting point, all of the worlds can be tackled with any character in any order. The overall objective of the game is to explore all the galaxy to collect several starship parts and save a large number of Tribal survivors. Tribals can potentially be killed by weaponsfire, requiring the player to restart the encounter in order to save them. The player must collect all 12 ship parts and 282 Tribals to access the final stage.

In addition to the single-player mode, Jet Force Gemini features a multiplayer mode where two to four players can compete in traditional deathmatch games. Options such as the weapons available, the winning condition, and time limit can be changed to match player preference. Some multiplayer aspects, such as levels and characters, must be unlocked by finding the corresponding secret in the game's single-player mode. Players can unlock racing mini-games that are played from an overhead perspective, as well as a firing range challenge, where players must shoot numerous targets while the game automatically follows a predefined path. Jet Force Gemini features a no split-screen co-operative mode where a second player may take control of Floyd, a floating robot that automatically follows the main player character in the single-player mode.

== Plot ==
Jet Force Gemini revolves around the galactic law enforcement team Jet Force Gemini, composed of twin siblings Juno and Vela and their wardog mascot Lupus. The game begins with the three characters in orbit around the planet Goldwood after barely escaping the destruction of the entire Jet Force fleet at the hands of the insectoid Mizar, who has been capturing and enslaving the native Tribals on Goldwood. When their ship is boarded by several of Mizar's drones, the three decide to abandon their ship and go off on their own separate paths to stop the invasion. Along the way, Juno finds and reconstructs Floyd, a small floating robot who defects from Mizar and agrees to aid the team. After traversing various planets, the heroes find themselves reunited at Mizar's Palace and confront Mizar, who escapes to a nearby asteroid and sets course to impact with Earth. To help the heroes, the Tribals' leader King Jeff provides them with an ancient starship that can quickly catch up to Mizar's asteroid, asking them to rescue all the Tribals throughout the galaxy in exchange.

After rescuing all the Tribals and restoring the starship with several needed parts, the team, along with King Jeff, departs to the asteroid and battle Mizar. To everyone's surprise, Mizar is revealed to be a robot controlled by King Jeff's jealous brother, Barry, who apologizes for letting things get out of hand. With time running out until the asteroid strikes Earth, Floyd offers to carry a warhead into the asteroid's core and destroy it. The team hesitantly agrees and flees in the starship shortly before Floyd sacrifices himself to destroy the asteroid. On Earth, the Jet Force Gemini team is given the highest honors for their accomplishments.

== Development ==
Jet Force Gemini was developed by Rare's Blast Corps team. Work on the game began in 1997 with lead engineer Paul Mountain, who had previously worked on Diddy Kong Racing. The inspirations of the game ranged from 80s arcade classics to more recent titles of the time. The free-roaming nature of Nintendo's Super Mario 64 influenced the scale and the openness of some of the backgrounds and settings, while the collecting and upgrading of weapons were inspired by Super Metroid. Mountain revealed that "the behaviour of the bad guys was a mixture of arcade space shooter formations and Quake-style 'attack and cover' mechanics". According to him, "I suppose, in short, we were inspired by all the good stuff we'd played and enjoyed playing." Jet Force Gemini borrowed elements from non-video game sources. Lead artist Lee Musgrave admitted, "There are elements of Star Wars in there, Aliens, Dune, Battle of the Planets, even Stargate – it was a real mix of everything and anything 'space' related."

Most of the characters in the game were named after stars and constellations, such as Mizar and Vela. Originally, the protagonists Juno and Vela were designed as younger and more cartoon-like with large heads, but they were ultimately changed to a more mature version because Nintendo expressed concerns over a game starring two children killing a large number of creatures. The game's controls were one of the main concerns during development. The idea was to retain a character-based game, where players could see the character they were playing while keeping the tightness and accuracy of first-person shooters. Rare initially attempted to automate the change of view and targeting mode based on the context of the action, but this idea was eventually replaced with a manual system. According to Mountain, "The solution we ended with is a beautiful thing. It feels very old-school to me; difficult, unforgiving, but ultimately precise."

Because several members of the team enjoyed racing games and had worked on Diddy Kong Racing, they decided to include the futuristic Ant racing mini-game in the campaign mode and the top-down arcade racing games in the multiplayer mode. Developers initially considered the possibility to use the 4MB Nintendo 64 Expansion Pak, but the idea was eventually dropped. According to Mountain, "we wanted to deliver the same experience to all players and were confident that we could do this using the standard 4MB of RAM on the console." This led to some confusion as the box cover for the original release stated that it did support such a feature. Nintendo provided a quick-fix to the mislabeled covers by providing stickers declaring its Rumble Pak compatibility and fixed later printings of the boxes.

== Release ==
In May 1999, a playable demonstration of the game was presented at the Electronic Entertainment Expo in Los Angeles, California. A more complete version of the game was showcased at Nintendo Spaceworld in Japan in August 1999, alongside Rare's Donkey Kong 64 and Perfect Dark. The game was originally intended to be released in North America on August 31, 1999, but was pushed back to September 27, 1999, to give the developers more time to polish up the game. It was then pushed back even further to October 11, 1999, due to manufacturing delays. In Europe, the game was released on October 29, 1999, and on December 1, 1999, in Japan. The Japanese release of Jet Force Gemini was localized as Star Twins (スターツインズ) because Nintendo felt that the Japanese pronunciation of the Western title, "Jetto Fōsu Jeminai", was too difficult to pronounce. Although 4Kids Entertainment obtained the rights to merchandising Jet Force Gemini and Perfect Dark toys, movies, and other recreational products, the company did not produce any merchandise.

== Reception ==
Reception

Aggregate score
Aggregator	Score
Metacritic	80/100

Review scores
Publication	Score
AllGame	4/5
Edge	9/10
Game Informer	7.75/10
GameRevolution	B
GameSpot	8.8/10
IGN	8.1/10
N64 Magazine	93%
Next Generation	3/5
Nintendo Life	7/10
Nintendo Power	9/10
The Cincinnati Enquirer	1.5/4

Jet Force Gemini received generally positive reviews from critics. Edge described it as "a straightforward blaster at heart", while AllGame claimed that it "pays homage to 8- and 16-bit games with its emphasis on high-intensity action and level design that requires skill with the controller." Writing for IGN, journalist Matt Casamassina remarked that, although Jet Force Gemini has some flaws and could be more polished, it is "still one of Nintendo 64's most original games and it has much more good going for it than it does bad." In a mixed review, Next Generation felt that the game was bloated with too many features and that it may exhaust players before it is over, concluding that the game would have been "twice as good" if "Rare had cut all the tedious parts".

The game's graphics and surround sound effects were received very positively. Casamassina described its sound effects as "dead-on and crystal clear" and its soundtrack as "some of the very best ever put into a Nintendo 64 game", while GameRevolution said that the game "goes for a more operatic feel than the generic video game techno." Graphically, the game was highlighted for its "visually stunning" settings, "state-of-the-art" animations, and special lighting, with Game Informer remarking that the game's "enormous" explosions help intensify the action. Despite the praise, some critics observed occasional frame rate drops when the action increases or when the game is played in non-widescreen mode. Edge also criticized the camera for refusing to move in some situations, requiring players to enter the aiming mode to manually center it behind the player character.

Although Jet Force Gemini was generally praised for its challenging artificial intelligence, included mini-games and length, some critics reacted negatively to the game's insistence on having to save every Tribal to fully complete the campaign mode. Casamassina felt that this task was "far too tedious to truly be enjoyed." In contrast, N64 Magazine stated that revisiting previous stages with new weapons was fun and extends the game's lifespan. Critics agreed its controls were complex and confusing and that they were clunky during multiplayer. In a negative review, The Cincinnati Enquirer explained that the game is frustrating because players are required to constantly change from using the analog stick to the C buttons of the Nintendo 64 controller when switching to combat mode. GameSpot said that the controls remain responsive at all times, but acknowledged that the alternation between the two control styles may frustrate some players.

In a retrospective review, Nintendo Life stated that Jet Force Gemini is "a really enjoyable game" with "its fair share of flaws that tend to hinder the experience a little too much. That being said, it's certainly an incredibly fun title, at its best, that will definitely raise a few smiles."

== Legacy ==
After the release of Jet Force Gemini, work on a Game Boy Color version of the game started, but the project was ultimately cancelled. According to former Rare designer and producer Martin Wakeley, Jet Force Gemini on the Game Boy Color "was the only occasion I can remember Rare outsourcing anything. It was being done by Bits Studios and was nearly done last time I saw it, I'm not sure what happened to it." The game would be a shooter played from an isometric perspective and would follow Juno and Lupus searching for Vela after a signal is broadcast from an unknown planet. The game was never officially announced by either Rare or Nintendo.

In 2000, Jet Force Gemini was ranked by IGN at number 20 in their list of The Top 25 N64 Games of All Time. In 2009, Official Nintendo Magazine ranked it the 93rd best game available on Nintendo platforms. The staff called it Rare's "big hope" due to the highly anticipated but delayed Nintendo 64 game Perfect Dark. Subsequent games developed by Rare have featured cameo appearances of Jet Force Gemini, including Kameo, Viva Piñata: Trouble in Paradise, and Banjo-Tooie. Players may also dress their character up as Juno, Vela, and Lupus in Minecraft: Xbox 360 Edition through the use of a downloadable content pack. The game is included as part of the Rare Replay video game compilation for Xbox One, with support for dual-analog controls being added post-release. The game was also re-released via the Nintendo Classics service on November 30, 2023 in Japan, and on December 7, 2023 in western regions.
