= Ultimate Play the Game =

Defunct video games developer and publisher

Ashby Computers and Graphics Limited
- Trade name: Ultimate Play the Game
- Type: Private
- Industry: Video games
- Founded: 1982; 44 years ago
- Successor: Rare
- Headquarters: Ashby-de-la-Zouch, England
- Key people: Tim Stamper (graphics director); Chris Stamper (software director); Carol Stamper née Ward (director); John Lathbury (director); Louise Stamper; Christian Penfold
- Products: Atic Atac; Jetpac; Lunar Jetman; Knight Lore; Sabre Wulf
- Parent: Rare

Ashby Computers and Graphics Limited, trading as Ultimate Play the Game, was a British video game developer and publisher, founded in 1982, by ex-arcade video game developers Tim and Chris Stamper. Ultimate released a series of successful games for the ZX Spectrum, Amstrad CPC, BBC Micro, MSX and Commodore 64 computers from 1983 until 1987. Ultimate are perhaps best remembered for the big-selling titles Jetpac and Sabre Wulf, each of which sold over 300,000 copies in 1983 and 1984 respectively, and their groundbreaking series of isometric arcade adventures using a technique termed Filmation. Knight Lore, the first of the Filmation games, has been retrospectively described in the press as "seminal ... revolutionary" (GamesTM), "one of the most successful and influential games of all time" (X360), and "probably ... the greatest single advance in the history of computer games" (Edge).

By the time of the label's last use in 1988 on a retrospective compilation, Ultimate had evolved into Rare and moved on to developing titles for Nintendo consoles. Rare was purchased by Microsoft in 2002 for US$377 million, a record price for a video game developer, and now develops exclusively for Microsoft platforms such as Xbox and Microsoft Windows. In 2006, Rare revived the "Ultimate Play the Game" name for an Xbox Live Arcade remake of Jetpac named Jetpac Refuelled. In 2015, several Ultimate titles were collected and released as part of the Rare Replay compilation for Xbox One.

== History ==
=== Early history and rise ===
Ultimate Play the Game was founded in the Leicestershire town of Ashby-de-la-Zouch in 1982 by Tim and Chris Stamper, their friend John Lathbury, and Tim's girlfriend (later wife) Carole Ward. Other members of the Stamper family were also involved in the early running and support of the company, which was initially located in a house next to the family-run newsagent. Both Tim and Chris had worked in arcade game development including, according to one report, Konami's Gyruss, and claimed to be "the most experienced arcade video game design team in Britain" until tiring of working for others and leaving to start Ashby Computers and Graphics. This led to ACG's initial trade being in creating arcade conversion kits, before moving into the home computer software market developing games under the Ultimate Play the Game name. Ashby released four arcade games: Blue Print for Bally-Midway, and Grasspin, Dingo and Saturn for Jaleco.

Ultimate's first game was Jetpac in May 1983 for the 16K Spectrum. In a 1983 interview, Tim Stamper said that they deliberately targeted 16K machines as their smaller size meant development time was much shorter, claiming they could produce two 16K games in one month, or one 48K game. Jetpac was a huge commercial success selling more than 300,000 copies providing the fledgling company with a turnover in excess of £1 million.

This was followed by three further 16K releases, Pssst in June, Tranz Am, and Cookie, before Ultimate stepped up to the 48K Spectrum. Jetpac, Pssst, Tranz Am and Cookie were four of only ten games ever to be released on the 16K ROM format for use with the ZX Interface 2. They were also (except Tranz Am) republished on cassette, with distinctive silver inlay cards, by Sinclair Research.

Ultimate's first 48K releases were Lunar Jetman – a sequel to Jetpac – and Atic Atac, both of which were released in late 1983. Both games were very well received by the gaming press, CRASH magazine in particular praising what Ultimate had managed to do with the extra memory Lunar Jetman used. In 1984 came Sabre Wulf, the first in the Sabreman series, and the first release at a recommended retail price of £9.95. The price of Ultimate titles had previously been just £5.50, which was typical for Spectrum arcade-style games at the time. This increase was to discourage piracy, with the idea being that if customers paid more for a game they would be less inclined to give away copies. This coincided with the introduction of the distinctive Ultimate "big box" packaging (used with all further Spectrum releases until Gunfright, and with various releases on other platforms), which the company felt might also help justify the price increase and encourage gamers to buy the game rather than copy it. The strategy paid off as Sabre Wulf went on to sell over 350,000 copies on the Spectrum alone. This was followed by the release in late 1984 of the next two instalments in the Sabreman series, Underwurlde quickly followed by Knight Lore. Knight Lore was something of a revolution in the home computer game market, using a forced-perspective isometric viewpoint branded Filmation, the style of which would be extensively copied in other games, notable examples being Batman and Head Over Heels from Ocean Software. In a 1988 interview with CRASH, Tim Stamper claimed that Knight Lore, and some of its Filmation follow-up Alien 8, was actually completed before Sabre Wulf but Ultimate decided that it could have a potentially negative effect on sales of the comparatively primitive Sabre Wulf, so it was postponed until late 1984. More recent research into the code of both games has suggested this may have been an exaggeration as the coding routines found in Knight Lore are far more optimised.

Knight Lore was finished before Sabre Wulf. But we decided the market wasn't ready for it. Because if we released Knight Lore and Alien 8, which was already half-finished, we wouldn't have sold Sabre Wulf ... There was a little bit of careful planning there ... We just had to sit on it because everyone else was so far behind

— Tim Stamper, CRASH magazine, April 1988

Ultimate won the Golden Joystick Award for Best Software House in both 1983 and 1984.

Ultimate was criticised somewhat in the gaming media for their repeated use of the Filmation technique in subsequent games Alien 8, Nightshade, Gunfright and Pentagram, though Nightshade and Gunfright used Filmation II, a variation on the engine, resulting in a similar visual style, but significantly different gameplay, with scrolling around a large world and arcade-like play, rather than the room-based puzzles of the earlier Filmation titles.

=== Decline ===
With the consistent success of Ultimate's releases there were rumours of a buyout by Ocean, until it was announced in 1985 that the Stamper brothers had sold a minority stake in the company to US Gold, who would continue to release games under the Ultimate label. Later titles such as Martianoids and Bubbler were not seen by the gaming press as being up to Ultimate's previously high standards and sales fell. US Gold released no new Ultimate games after Bubbler in 1987. A final Sabreman game, Mire Mare, was trailed in earlier Sabreman games and was mentioned by Sinclair User as being next up for release, but was quietly dropped during development. In late 1988, Rare bought back the rights sold to US Gold and were reported to be developing games again. Future releases were to have included Solar Jetman, which would eventually appear only on the Nintendo Entertainment System, although home computer conversions for the Commodore 64, Amiga, and Atari ST were completed by Storm Software, but not released.

=== Rare Limited ===
Shortly before the US Gold buyout, the name of another company, "Rare Limited", began appearing on the credits of Ultimate releases. This was in fact another company set up by the Stampers to develop for Ultimate, but not be subject to any Ultimate takeover. Rare (initially under the banner Rare: Designs on the Future) would evolve, after Ultimate's demise, into a prolific developer for the Nintendo Entertainment System. This led Nintendo to purchase a stake in the company, whose success was furthered with such classic SNES and Nintendo 64 releases as Donkey Kong Country and GoldenEye 007. In 2002, Rare was purchased outright by Microsoft for US$377 million, a record fee for a video game developer, and develops games for the Xbox One console. At the end of 2006, Tim and Chris Stamper left Rare to "pursue other opportunities", ending a 24-year involvement in developing home video games.

=== The Ultimate name in subsequent years ===
The 1997 Nintendo 64 game GoldenEye 007 contains a ZX Spectrum emulator with ten Ultimate-developed games hidden on the cartridge. This function was originally made as an experimental side project by Rare and was deactivated in the final version, but has since been unlocked through fan-made patches. In 2004, Rare revived Ultimate's Sabreman franchise with the release of Sabre Wulf for the Game Boy Advance. A new version of Sabre Wulf for the Xbox was also rumoured, though it was never released or even officially announced. A racing game based on the Ultimate/Rare universe titled Sabreman Stampede was also in development, but was canceled. In 2007, Rare released the fourth game of the Jetman series, Jetpac Refuelled, for Xbox Live Arcade.

On 8 December 2006 and 16 January 2007 respectively, Rare's owners Microsoft Corporation filed US and EU trademark claims on the Ultimate Play the Game name and logo. The registered purpose is "entertainment services, namely, providing an on-line computer game". Emulated versions of seven Ultimate titles were later included as part of the 2015 game compilation Rare Replay for Xbox One.

== Relationship with the press and fans ==
=== Press ===
An advertisement in the style commonly used by Ultimate

Ultimate had a reputation for secrecy that has continued to a lesser extent with successor Rare. Due to the small number of staff employed at Ultimate in the early days, the company had no time to speak to the press or attend trade events. The British computer gaming press even complained over how difficult it was to get hold of them. As Tim Stamper later said:

...that's the way it turned out, we were so busy producing a few products a year and making sure they were right. I think while we were full-time Ultimate, we only had two Christmas mornings off, and that's how hard it was. We worked seven days a week, 8am till 1 or 2 in the morning. I don't feel it's any good having engineers who only work 9 to 5 because you get a 9 to 5 game.

— Tim Stamper, CRASH magazine, April 1988

This press blackout soon worked to the company's advantage. Due to their reputation for producing high quality products, along with speculation in the press and amongst gamers, anticipation for each release was high. This was helped along by the full-page advertisements placed in magazines showing the cover art of the game in question, but no shots or description of the game itself. These ads would be run prior to and for several months after the release date. The magazines were not able to preview the games; the review copies, usually sent out just before general release, would be the first opportunity for anyone to see them. Not talking to the press worked for Ultimate and it soon became policy. When a journalist reviewing Nightshade for CRASH magazine asked Ultimate what the object of the game was, and how large the play area was, they responded with, respectively, "oh, we can't tell you that" and "it's pretty large".

==== Lunar Jetman's trailer ====
The Lunar Jetman "trailer" screenshot as published in CRASH magazine, February 1986

This air of mystery was increased when CRASH magazine published a reader's photograph of Lunar Jetman featuring Jetman's moon rover pulling a trailer. The possible existence of a trailer (as depicted on the game's cover art and loading screen) had been speculated on since the game's release, and many fans had searched fruitlessly for it. The Stampers shrugged off questions about whether this screen shot was genuine, but stopped short of actually denying it. There have even been suggestions that Ultimate themselves may have created the screen shot to generate more interest in the game. It has since been proven that Lunar Jetman's code does not contain graphics for a trailer.

=== Fans ===
Ultimate were one of the first developers to have their own fanbase focused on the company and brand as much as the games themselves. They received so much fan mail at their peak that a full-time employee had to be taken on to deal with up to 60 letters per day. They were known for their positive attitude to fans, always replying to letters and responding to requests for merchandise by sending posters, sweatshirts and caps free of charge. The Stampers later stated that they were more interested in creating the games than making money from merchandising. Retro Gamer has suggested that besides the quality of the games, Ultimate's popularity arose from a combination of "superb presentation" as well as the company's "air of mystique" giving it a "secretive yet cool vibe".

== Other platforms ==
The main series of games produced by Ultimate were all released on the ZX Spectrum, with most from Sabre Wulf onward also on the Amstrad CPC and MSX, and most early games up to and including Nightshade also on the BBC Micro. Only three of these (Sabre Wulf, Underwurlde and Nightshade) were released on the other major platform of the time, the Commodore 64, however a series of C64-exclusive titles were published by Ultimate:

- The Staff of Karnath (1984)
- Entombed (1985)
- Imhotep (1985)
- Blackwyche (1985)
- Outlaws (1985)
- Dragon Skulle (1985)

The Staff of Karnath, Entombed, Blackwyche and Dragon Skulle all concern the adventures of Sir Arthur Pendragon.

== Authorship ==
The company's secretive tendencies also extended to the question of who wrote the games. Whereas most games of the time would list those responsible on the cassette inlay cards or even on the front of the box (one notable example, Football Manager, even going as far as to feature a picture of author Kevin Toms on the front of the box), no Ultimate title ever mentioned any names at all, and the authorship of some of them remains unclear.

The Ultimate titles up to Gunfright were produced primarily by Tim and Chris Stamper; Tim provided the graphics and Chris the programming, along with fellow founders John Lathbury (coding) and Carol Ward (graphic design). Tim also created the cover art for the games, including the famous Ultimate Play the Game logo. The Stampers retained the major creative roles until the purchase by US Gold, who brought in their own programming teams to create Martianoids and Bubbler. The exact authorship of Pentagram and Cyberun is known only to those involved; often considered US Gold games, they are both possibly Stamper games. This remains a possibility as although Chris Stamper has said in an interview, "What was the last one we developed as a team? It was Gunfright, I think", Ultimate had already admitted to developing games in an order different from that of their release, as with Knight Lore and Sabre Wulf.

The authorship of the Commodore 64 titles was at the time even more uncertain. The conversions of existing Spectrum games Sabre Wulf, Underwurlde and Nightshade were handled by Firebird, who hired Mr Micro, Softstone, and PSI, respectively, to develop the titles. Imhotep was submitted to Ultimate in a virtually complete form by author Manuel Caballero, who had previously written Batty Builders and Firefleet. Ultimate did not make any announcements regarding the authorship of the other Commodore games, but an article by Martyn Carroll revealed how Frank Gasking of "Games that weren't 64" managed to identify the creators as Dave and Robert (Bob) Thomas based on a message that appears on the final screen of Dragon Skulle. These two brothers were also the creators of the previous three games of the series The Staff of Karnath, Entombed and Blackwyche. In an interview with the brothers in Retro Gamer magazine, they revealed they also authored Outlaws, in just six weeks, so Ultimate would have something for the Commodore 64 for Christmas.
