= Grabbed by the Ghoulies =

2003 video game

- European cover art
- Developer: Rare
- Publisher: Microsoft Game Studios
- Designer: Gregg Mayles
- Programmer: Chris Sutherland
- Artists: Steve Mayles; Ed Bryan; Steven Hurst
- Composer: Grant Kirkhope
- Platform: Xbox
- Release: NA: 21 October 2003; EU: 21 November 2003
- Genres: Action-adventure, beat 'em up
- Mode: Single-player

Grabbed by the Ghoulies is an action-adventure game developed by Rare and published by Microsoft Game Studios exclusively for the Xbox. It was released in North America in October 2003, and in Europe in November. It was re-released worldwide on the Xbox 360 as a downloadable Xbox Live Originals game in February 2009. This was removed from the store in June 2015, two months before a remastered version was released as part of the Rare Replay compilation for Xbox One. The game follows a young boy, Cooper, who sets out to rescue his girlfriend from a haunted mansion infested with supernatural creatures.

Having originally been in development for the GameCube, Grabbed by the Ghoulies was the first Rare game to be published by Microsoft after Rare was bought by them in 2002. The game was met with mixed reviews upon release. Criticism was directed at the gameplay, but the game's graphics and style were praised. Grabbed by the Ghoulies was nominated for the Console Family Game of the Year prize at the 7th Annual Interactive Achievement Awards.

== Gameplay ==
A still image from the game, showing Cooper about to engage in combat

Grabbed by the Ghoulies is a 3D action-adventure game with beat 'em up elements. Breaking with the style of previous Rare platformers, the gameplay is simple in design, utilizing the premise of moving through areas of the game's mansion and completing the required challenges in each room. Such challenges include eliminating all ghoulies in a room, beating only a specified kind of ghouly while avoiding eliminating the rest, or finding a key hidden inside a ghouly before the player-character, Cooper, can continue. All combat and melee attacks are maneuvered by the control sticks, whereas the game's camera can be rotated by both triggers. Most of the objects in the mansion are destructible, with the chance of finding Super Soup power-ups inside. The Super Soups can have negative effects, like reversing the player's controls or lowering Cooper's speed, or positive effects, such as making Cooper invulnerable or immobilizing all ghoulies in the room. When the player fails a challenge or takes longer than a set time limit to complete one, rather than immediately restarting the room, the Grim Reaper will chase after Cooper; the Reaper will instantly kill Cooper if he's touched and the player will have to restart the room over, but the Reaper can also be used to the player's advantage, as he will also kill any ghouly that he touches. Standard enemies in the game include zombies, mummies, imps, skeletons and zombie pirates. Many objects in the game with which the character can interact—including chairs, knives, and axes—can be used as weapons.

The game also features various bonus challenges. Each room the player visits contains one of 100 hidden Bonus Books to be collected. For every five books the player collects, a bonus challenge is unlocked. The main objective of the bonus challenges is to revisit one of the rooms and perform a different task within it, such as defeating a number of enemies in a certain amount or time or surviving a duel with the Grim Reaper. If a player successfully completes a bonus challenge, they are awarded a bronze, silver, gold or platinum medal based on their performance. For every platinum medal earned, a piece of the game's concept art is unlocked. If the player earns a gold or platinum medal for all 20 challenges, a final challenge is unlocked that tasks players with completing the entire game again as Cooper's girlfriend Amber, who has very low health and cannot use power-ups. Completing the 21st challenge unlocks the game's E3 trailer and a deleted cutscene in the bonus gallery.

== Plot ==
Cooper and his girlfriend Amber are looking for shelter from a storm when they come across Ghoulhaven Hall, a mansion owned by Baron Von Ghoul. When Cooper calls him a creep, Von Ghoul kidnaps Amber in retaliation. Cooper chases after Amber, encountering the many ghoulies inhabiting Ghoulhaven Hall. Crivens, the mansion's butler, agrees to assist Cooper, guiding him through the manor. Cooper eventually finds Amber, but before the two of them can escape, the mad scientist Dr. Krackpot appears and transforms Amber into a hideous ghouly. Cooper asks the cook Ma Soupswill for help, and she tasks him with collecting three ingredients she needs to synthesize a cure. Along the way, he is aided by the mansion's other inhabitants, including groundskeeper Fiddlesworth Dunfiddlin, Soupswill's skeletal assistant Mr. Ribs, and cleaning lady Barbara Buffbrass. After gathering the ingredients, Soupswill gives Cooper a jar of the cure. When Cooper pours the cure on Amber, Soupswill is shown to have mixed up one of the ingredients, resulting in Amber transforming into a bigger, hostile ghouly. Cooper is nearly overpowered by Amber, but Soupswill arrives and applies the correct cure, transforming Amber back to normal.

Cooper and Amber prepare to leave the mansion, but Mr. Ribs begs Cooper to help free other children imprisoned throughout the manor. Crivens tells Cooper that Von Ghoul has the key to free the children, but the door to his quarters is locked by a powerful spell, which can only be broken using a counterspell that is in three pieces scattered throughout the mansion. Cooper defeats Dr. Krackpot, collects the three pieces and enter's Von Ghoul's quarters, but finds that Crivens is already there seemingly attacking Von Ghoul and retrieving the key. When Cooper attempts to take the key, Crivens attacks him and removes his disguise, revealing he was Von Ghoul all along. Cooper fights and defeats Von Ghoul, throwing him out of the mansion and collecting the key. Cooper then follows Mr. Ribs throughout the mansion and races to free all the children before the mansion's doors are permanently locked, trapping them inside forever.

If Cooper succeeds in freeing all ten children before time runs out, he and Mr. Ribs are ambushed by imps outside the mansion. Cooper is knocked unconscious and Mr. Ribs is decapitated, but before the imps can feast on them, Ma Soupswill arrives and fights back the imps. Cooper regains consciousness and is thanked for his efforts by Soupswill, Mr. Ribs, Dunfiddlin and Buffbrass. Cooper and Amber then walk off to a nearby village, unaware that Baron Von Ghoul is following behind them in his makeshift plane. If Cooper does not save all the children in time, the scene in which Soupswill defends Cooper and Mr. Ribs from the imps is omitted.

== Development ==
Ghoulies was a less rocky road. We did a bit of work on a GameCube version and then over to the Xbox, and then literally I think we put our foot down.

— Gregg Mayles in an interview with Retro Gamer

The development of Grabbed by the Ghoulies began in 2000, after the completion of Banjo-Tooie. The idea for the game began with the name, which is a pun on "goolies", a British slang term for "testicles". According to designer Gregg Mayles, the name of the game materialised after he overheard someone mention "being grabbed by the goolies", and thought that it would make a suitable name for an upcoming Rare game. Before any details of the game were publicised, it was rumoured that Grabbed by the Ghoulies would be the subtitle to the next Conker the Squirrel game. After Microsoft purchased Rare for £375 million in 2002, development of the game for the GameCube was delayed until Rare converted it to the Xbox console.

Development of the game took under three years. It was originally conceived as a larger, non-linear open platform game for the GameCube. However, a simpler design and simpler concept were adopted due to the Microsoft buyout and increasing time constraints. After Microsoft's purchase of Rare, the studio re-affirmed their "simple design" of the game so that players would be able to easily adapt and devote less commitment to it. In a retrospective interview, Mayles stated that the change from GameCube to Xbox was difficult and required a lot of changes as Grabbed by the Ghoulies was "an original game that started life as a Nintendo product".

According to Mayles, Grabbed by the Ghoulies was not inspired by Rare's similar-themed Atic Atac. The cel-shaded art style and design of the characters in Grabbed by the Ghoulies were inspired by Hanna-Barbera cartoons, and the various character personalities were based both on historical figures and people from Mayles' childhood. Antagonist Baron von Ghoul was "a mix" of the Red Baron and British aristocracy, whereas supportive characters, such as Ma Soupswill, were loosely based on staff from a school. Mayles considered the conversion of the game to the Xbox to be one of the hardest challenges during development, as Rare had less than a year to finish the game once it was converted.

== Release ==
The game was revealed at E3 2003, with a playable demo being a mostly complete version of the game, albeit with a few levels missing. Grabbed by the Ghoulies was released in North America on 21 October 2003, in Europe on 21 November and in Japan on 29 April 2004, becoming Rare's first game to be released under Microsoft. It was later re-released as an Xbox Originals game for the Xbox 360 on 16 February 2009, later being removed from the store on 16 June 2015, before the Rare Replay compilation game which included it was released on 4 August 2015. The game was remastered to run natively on the Xbox One, increasing its resolution and framerate relative to the original Xbox release. Grabbed by the Ghoulies was one of the first original Xbox games to be compatible with Xbox One via backwards compatibility.

== Reception ==
Reception

Aggregate score
| Aggregator | Score |
|---|---|
| Metacritic | 66/100 |

Review scores
| Publication | Score |
|---|---|
| 1Up.com | C+ |
| Eurogamer | 8/10 |
| GameRevolution | C |
| IGN | 7/10 |

The game was met with mixed reviews from critics upon release. It holds an average score of 66/100 at Metacritic, based on an aggregate of 42 reviews.

The graphics and animation were praised by critics. Kevin Gifford of 1UP stated that the cel-shaded graphics were "perfect" for the "spooky" theme of the game, and that the smooth animation resulted in the enemies appearing "endearing". Ronan Jennings of Eurogamer was less impressed by the graphics, stating that the game "never blew him away" but always kept a high standard of creativity. However, Jennings did praise the animation and character designs. Reviewers of Game Revolution gave praise to the game's visuals, comparing them to be sharper and clearer to the visuals of Banjo-Kazooie, but noted that the character designs still seemed "tied down to the past", being more suited to the Nintendo 64 than to the Xbox.

The game was criticised for its simplistic gameplay and lack of innovation. Gifford noted that the game's "biggest problem" was its unchallenging gameplay, stating that it was "repetitive"; he compared it to gameplay of the 16-bit era. Game Revolution stated that the gameplay appeared "interesting" at first, but grew tiresome the longer the game is played, despite its short length. Jennings noted that the gameplay was not "groundbreaking" and similarly stated that the game relied heavily on "what is practically 16-bit gameplay". The camera controls were another criticised aspect of the game, due to the control sticks being allocated for attack functions. Gifford labelled the "forced shunt" idea as a "terrible drag" which became troublesome during the latter half of the game. Game Revolution's review also criticised the camera controls, stating that the use of triggers to rotate the camera was "on the clunky side". Jennings, however, felt that the camera was "fine" and did not provide any obstruction.

The game was similarly criticised when it was reviewed retrospectively as a part of the Rare Replay compilation game. Marty Sliva of IGN stated that it was among the games on the compilation that had "failed to withstand the test of time", describing it as "very boring". Similarly, Dan Whitehead of Eurogamer felt that the game represented Rare's "slump period", calling it a "particularly awkward gear change" for the developer. Despite its problems however, Whitehead also felt that the game "has a charm and character that is almost entirely absent from the AAA console space in 2015".

Grabbed by the Ghoulies was nominated for "Console Family Game of the Year" and "Outstanding Achievement in Original Music Composition" at the 7th Annual Interactive Achievement Awards; the first award was ultimately given to EyeToy: Play and The Sims: Bustin' Out (in a tie), while the latter was given to Medal of Honor: Rising Sun.
