= Jetpac Refuelled =

2007 video game

- Cover art for Jetpac Refuelled on Xbox Live Arcade
- Developer: Rare
- Publisher: Microsoft Studios
- Composer: Steve Burke
- Series: Jetman
- Platform: Xbox 360
- Release: WW: 28 March 2007
- Genres: Shooter, shoot 'em up
- Modes: Single-player, multiplayer

Jetpac Refuelled is an arcade-style shooter video game developed by Rare and published by Microsoft Studios. It was released worldwide on the Xbox Live Arcade service on March 28, 2007. The game is the fourth instalment of the Jetman series and a remake of Ultimate Play the Game's 1983 ZX Spectrum game, Jetpac. The game follows Jetman as he attempts to rebuild his rocket to explore different planets while defending himself from hostile aliens.

Details of the game were leaked in February 2007, shortly before Rare announced development one month later. During the development process, Rare attempted to ensure that the game did not feel too similar to the original Jetpac, while keeping the core mechanics. The game received mostly favourable reviews upon release. Critics praised the updated graphics and gameplay, but criticised the game's repetitiveness and multiplayer mode. It was rereleased as part of Rare's 2015 Xbox One compendium compilation Rare Replay, along with all three original Jetman games.

== Gameplay ==
A still image of gameplay. Jetman must collect various fuel pods before he can leave this planet.

The game is a remake of the original Jetpac with overhauled high-definition graphics and 128 levels. It features competitive gameplay over Xbox Live, leaderboards, and achievements. The player assumes control of Jetman and is presented in a horizontal wrap around which consists of six platforms on which Jetman can manoeuvre onto. The game objective is to have Jetman assemble his rocket, which spawns in separate parts scattered around a map, then fill it with six fuel canisters. When this objective is completed, the character progresses to the next planet, where the procedure is repeated. Jetman has to defend himself against each planet's hostile aliens and collect resources such as gold and platinum, which occasionally fall from the atmosphere, for bonus points.

Jetman's weapons are his laser and three nuclear devices which, once used, will eliminate all enemies from the screen. Weapon upgrades may spawn around a map; once picked up, these give Jetman upgrades to his weapon, including a wider fire spread, faster projectiles or greater damage. Jetman also has the ability to boost, which temporarily increases his speed, although boosts need to recharge when depleted.

Jetpac Refuelled features a multiplayer mode that can be played either offline using a split screen or online via Xbox Live. In this mode, the player competes to build and refuel their craft before their opponent. Fuel and rocket pickups can be stolen from opponents by shooting them or by using an EMP blast at close range. Lives are unlimited in multiplayer and the winner is determined by the highest score. A version of the original 1983 Jetpac is also included in the game.

== Development ==
We didn't want to change it into a completely different game so the original mechanics had to stay at the core, but we wanted to introduce new features for players to enjoy.

— Jens Restemeier in a retrospective interview with Rare Gamer

Details of a Jetpac remake were first leaked on a listing on the website of German rating board Unterhaltungssoftware Selbstkontrolle on February 6, 2007. Rare announced development of Jetpac Refuelled on February 22.

Rare designers Jens Restemeier and Nick Burton were interested in the upcoming Xbox Live Arcade and offered to develop a new game for the service after the release of Rare's Xbox 360 launch titles Kameo and Perfect Dark Zero. Rather than simply porting the original ZX Spectrum title to the Xbox 360, the development team decided to expand upon Jetpac and experiment with new elements. The team wanted to keep the core mechanics of the Jetpac whilst designing new features. Restemeier stated that the development process for an Xbox Live Arcade game differed from a retail title, owing to processing power limitations that had to be constantly synced over Xbox Live. Burton asserted that one of the differences with development on the Xbox Live service was the way optimizations shifted from graphics and game logic, stating that this was more difficult than it would have been for an Xbox 360 title such as Kameo.

The smaller scale of the project gave the development team creative control. Rare's management were purposefully kept unaware of the game's developments until key moments, a procedure Rare called "clean room testing". This allowed management to give a perspective not influenced by previous iterations or knowledge of the development process when testing the game.

The game was released on March 28, 2007, worldwide on Xbox Live Arcade. Jetpac Refuelled, along with every title in the Jetman series, appeared in the 2015 retrospective compilation of 30 Rare titles, Rare Replay for Xbox One.

== Reception ==
Reception

Aggregate scores
Aggregator	Score
GameRankings	72%
Metacritic	73/100

Review scores
Publication	Score
Eurogamer	7/10
GameSpot	7.2/10
GamesRadar+	3.5/5
IGN	8/10
VideoGamer.com	7/10

The game was met with mostly favourable reviews upon release. It received an aggregate score of 72% from GameRankings based on 16 reviews, and an average score of 73 out of 100 on Metacritic, based on 17 reviews. Jeff Gerstmann of GameSpot stated that those who had a nostalgic feeling towards Jetpac were more likely to enjoy the sequel.

Reviewers highlighted the game's high value relative to its low purchase price at its release. They stated that the gameplay was addictive and fast-paced, while Greg Stewart of GamesRadar stated that the gameplay was easy to learn. The game's graphics were highlighted positively, with some reviewers calling it the best aspect of the game and an improvement over the graphics of the previous game. Stewart labelled the updated graphics as "trippy" and Gerstmann praised the updated graphics as "crisp, bright and colourful". Gerstmann called the soundtrack "peppy" and "upbeat" while calling the sound effects "decent".

Reviewers criticised the repetitive aspects of its gameplay. This critique extended to the multiplayer mode, with Kristan Reed of Eurogamer stating it could be "annoying very quickly". Jonathan Miller, in his review for IGN, praised the multiplayer as "an unexpected treat", praising the gameplay aspect that allows players to attack their opponents and take fuel pods in their possession. Stewart called general gameplay "shallow", stating the game was "easily the weakest Live Arcade game to come out in the past two months" at the time of its release.
