= Lunar Jetman =

1983 video game

- Developer: Ultimate Play the Game
- Publisher: Ultimate Play the Game
- Designer: Tim and Chris Stamper
- Platforms: ZX Spectrum, BBC Micro
- Release: ZX Spectrum: UK: 1983; BBC Micro; 1985
- Genre: Scrolling shooter
- Mode: Single-player

Lunar Jetman is a horizontally scrolling shooter video game developed and published by Ultimate Play the Game. It was released for the ZX Spectrum in 1983 and later on the BBC Micro. In this sequel to Jetpac, the second instalment of the Jetman series, Jetman has to destroy alien bases whilst simultaneously defending himself, along with Earth, from a hostile alien race.

It was met with critical acclaim upon release for its addictive gameplay and range of colours. The game was followed by a sequel, Solar Jetman: Hunt for the Golden Warpship, developed by Rare and released by Nintendo for the Nintendo Entertainment System in 1990. It was later included in Rare's 2015 Xbox One retrospective compilation, Rare Replay.

== Gameplay ==
Jetman must collect bombs and destroy alien bases to advance to the next level.

Once again taking on the role of Jetman, players find themselves on the surface of a small purple planet. Similarly to its predecessor, the player can move around slowly on foot, or use a jetpack to leave the ground and navigate the planet faster. However, unlike Jetpac, Jetman's jetpack has limited fuel and must be topped up regularly. In addition to the jetpack, the player has a lunar rover for ground travel, inside of which they are invulnerable to damage. However, the rover can only negotiate smooth terrain, and Jetman may need to use bridging kits obtained from the rover to fill in craters on the planet's surface. The rover doubles as a refuelling point for Jetman's jetpack.

Aside from the rover and its bridging kits, Jetman has access to three other pieces of equipment, all of which can be carried on the rear of the rover, albeit one at a time. Bombs must be used to destroy alien bases when they are encountered, which can only be accomplished when Jetman is flying above them. Another piece of equipment is a cannon that may be mounted onto the rear side of the moon rover. The final piece of equipment is a pair of teleporters which can be used to instantaneously transport the player to the teleporter's twin, thus allowing rapid transport around the planet.

Gameplay itself requires Jetman to locate and destroy a series of alien bases on the surface of the planet. Each new base appears with the destruction of the previous one. To accomplish this task, Jetman must take the bomb to the alien base—either in his space suit or using the rover—and then fly over the base and drop the bomb. After several bases have been destroyed in succession, new and increasingly hazardous varieties of flying aliens assault the player. Each base must be destroyed within a strict time limit. If this limit expires before the base is destroyed, two missiles are launched from the base—one for Earth, the other for Jetman's rover. The player will be given a limited time to intercept and destroy the missile aimed at the rover, thus preventing a game over.

== Background and release ==
If the theme of Jetpac was to construct, then the theme for the sequel was to destroy.

— Brendan Gunn in a retrospective interview with Retro Gamer

Ultimate Play the Game was founded by brothers Tim and Chris Stamper, along with Tim's wife, Carol, from their headquarters in Ashby-de-la-Zouch in 1982. The company were known for their reluctance to reveal details about their operations and then-upcoming projects. Little was known about their development process except that they used to work in "separate teams": one team would work on development whilst the other would concentrate on other aspects such as sound or graphics.

Lunar Jetman was released for the ZX Spectrum in 1983 and later on the BBC Micro. It was re-released in August 2015 as part of the Xbox One compilation of 30 Rare titles, Rare Replay, after Microsoft purchased the rights to the game through their purchase of Rare.

== Reception ==
Reception

Review scores
Publication	Score
Crash	95%
Home Computing Weekly	5/5

Award
Publication	Award
Crash	Smash!

Similar to its predecessor, the game was critically acclaimed upon release. Crash praised the graphics and wide spectrum of colours, noting that whilst the presentation did not differ much from its predecessor, the graphics were "every bit as good" as superior arcade machines. Home Computing Weekly also praised the presentation, stating that the colour and animation were "superb", whilst expressing the gameplay as "disgustingly addictive".

When Crash revisited the game in their "Crashback" section of a 1984 issue, the game was still praised, with one reviewer stating that he would not change any of the original scores. Brian Buckley of ZX Computing praised the game's advanced graphics and effects, stating that extraordinary attention had been paid to detail and that every usage of sound and colour was "excellent". Buckley also asserted that Lunar Jetman was "the best computer game of all time".

The game entered the video game charts at number one in November 1983, replacing Ocean Software's Kong. The game was also voted number 31 in the Your Sinclair Official Top 100 Games of All Time. Home Computing Weekly placed Lunar Jetman third in their "Top 10 programs for the ZX Spectrum" in a later 1983 issue.
