= The Staff of Karnath =

1984 video game

- Developer: Ultimate Play the Game
- Publisher: Ultimate Play the Game
- Designers: Dave and Bob Thomas
- Platform: Commodore 64
- Release: December 1984
- Genre: Action-adventure
- Mode: Single-player

The Staff of Karnath is an action-adventure video game developed and published by Ultimate Play the Game for the Commodore 64 in December 1984. The game is the first instalment of the Pendragon series and is the first to feature the aristocrat adventurer Sir Arthur Pendragon. In the game, Sir Pendragon is tasked with searching a castle for the ancient Staff of Karnath, which he must destroy prior to midnight, before it wipes out the human race.

The game was created and designed by brothers Dave and Bob Thomas and was the first game to be released by Ultimate without founders Tim and Chris Stamper's direct involvement. The Staff of Karnath's setting and visuals were heavily inspired from the 1962 film Jack the Giant Killer. The game was met with generally positive reviews upon release. Critics were divided over its graphics and presentation, and criticised the sound. It was followed by a sequel, Entombed, which was released in 1985.

== Gameplay ==
A still image of gameplay. The interface displays the current objective, time remaining and life bar.

The game is presented in an oblique, isometric format and is set inside a haunted castle. As Sir Arthur Pendragon, the player's main objective is to collect 16 pieces of a key before midnight, which when all connected will form the shape of a pentacle. The pieces of the pentacle are guarded by various magical creatures, some of which can be defeated by casting spells, others requiring accurately timed attacks and nimble dodging. Once a piece is obtained, the player must take it to a specific chamber within the castle. Once all pentacles have been placed in their chambers, the player can establish the whereabouts of the Staff of Karnath, which must be destroyed before midnight.

Pendragon's only form of defence in the game is his ability to utilise various magical spells, in which the correct spell is required in order to defeat certain enemies. If the player is hit by an attack of any enemy in the castle, Pendragon will lose energy, or in some cases, time will be deducted from the countdown timer. If the player completely runs out of energy or fails to destroy the Staff of Karnath before midnight, the game will end.

== Plot ==
Millions of years ago, creatures known as Sarnathians ruled the Earth, centring their values on torture of other creatures that were opposed to their rule. Their aim was to rule the universe using a mysterious orb that granted them great power. Thousands of years later, the orb became too powerful and eventually caused a tear in the inter-dimensional fabric of the Realm of Reality and the Realm of Unreality, thus rendering the Sarnathians extinct.

The orb itself was buried deep in the ground for millions of years, until it was discovered by Karnath, an evil sorcerer. Upon finding the orb, Karnath fused it into his own magical staff, and on doing so learned the history of the Sarnathians. He became obsessed with the orb and the task of releasing these beings from the Realm of Unreality. After years of isolation in his castle, as his own death was drawing near, Karnath was finally able to cast a powerful spell over his staff. This spell was designed such that upon contact with the orb, it would unleash its most powerful state and tear the fabric of reality once more.

The staff was then hidden deep below the castle in a mystical obelisk, inscribed with powerful magical symbols to protect it. The obelisk was locked by a key which Karnath broke into 16 pieces and hid them throughout his castle. Centuries later, an aristocrat adventurer, Sir Arthur Pendragon, ventures inside the castle in order to defuse the orb before midnight. Should he fail, its power would be unleashed and the resulting inter-dimensional rip would wipe out the human race.

== Development and release ==
I'd had an idea in my mind about creating a pseudo-3D adventure game set in a castle which used a fixed perspective as though you were looking into a doll's house.

— Dave Thomas in a retrospective interview with Retro Gamer

Ultimate Play the Game was founded by brothers Tim and Chris Stamper, along with Tim's wife, Carol, from their headquarters in Ashby-de-la-Zouch in 1982. They began producing multiple video games for the ZX Spectrum throughout the early 1980s. The company was known for their reluctance to reveal details about their operations and upcoming projects. Little was known about their development process except that they used to work in "separate teams": one team would work on graphics while the other would concentrate on other aspects such as sound or programming.

The Pendragon series and The Staff of Karnath were created by brothers Dave and Robert "Bob" Thomas, rather than Ultimate founders Tim and Chris Stamper. Dave began his career in 1983 when he began producing games for the Atari 400, including moderate-sellers such as Warlok, which later won him £5,000 in a competition from Calisto Software. Although he later began working for the company in producing video games, he quit due to the strain of his daily 68 miles (109 km) commute. Shortly after quitting Calisto Software, Dave started work on The Staff of Karnath. Bob was a trained technical illustrator for the Ministry of Defence and had experience with designing interiors for the Royal Navy, which later aided to the military-themed visuals of the Pendragon series.

The game was programmed by Dave and the graphics were designed by Bob. According to Dave, the visuals and setting of the castle were inspired by the 1962 film Jack the Giant Killer, while the plot was influenced by H. P. Lovecraft's work. Dave admitted in a retrospective interview that the name of the series protagonist, "Sir Arthur Pendragon", was copied from the character of the Black Prince Pendragon from the Jack the Giant Killer stories.

The Thomas brothers decided to show their progress on the game to Tim and Chris Stamper for evaluation, despite feeling embarrassed due to their workspace being inside their parents' attic. Impressed by the game, the Stamper brothers commissioned an entire series to be released for the Commodore 64. Dave recalled that every game they produced was met with little interference from Ultimate: once a game was complete, it would be sent to quality assessment and subsequently published for release. The Staff of Karnath was released for the Commodore 64 in December 1984. It sold 40,000 units upon initial release, and work on the sequel, Entombed, began "almost immediately" according to Dave. The Staff of Karnath sold as many copies as its three sequels combined.

== Reception ==
Reception

Review scores
Publication	Score
Computer and Video Games	8/10
Commodore User	7.5/10
Personal Computer Games	9/10

The game received mostly positive reviews from critics upon release. Computer and Video Games was divided over the graphics, stating that they were "expecting more" from an Ultimate game. Chris Anderson of Personal Computer Games felt "disappointment" in the overall game, stating that what he saw on the screen was an "anti-climax", given how Anderson had been "waiting so long" for an Ultimate release on the Commodore 64. Commodore User praised the graphics, heralding the detail as "impressive", however they criticised the moving characters of the game, calling them "not quite as impressive" as the detail of the background, and did not live up to the instruction manual's promise of "cartoon quality" animation.

Anderson of Personal Computer Games praised the overall presentation, asserting that the rooms were of "extremely realistic" quality. In the same review, Richard Patey similarly praised the graphics, stating that they were "beautiful" throughout and "[lived] up to" every expectation. Commodore User criticised the sound effects, finding them "disappointing". Patey was also sceptical regarding the sound effects, regarding them as "average". Anderson summarised that the game "isn't going to hook everyone". The Staff of Karnath was declared as the seventh best Commodore 64 game in the first issue of Zzap!64 in May 1985.
