= Jetpac =

1983 video game

- ZX Spectrum cover art
- Developer: Ultimate Play the Game
- Publisher: Ultimate Play the Game
- Programmer: Chris Stamper
- Artist: Tim Stamper
- Platforms: ZX Spectrum, VIC-20, BBC Micro
- Release: ZX Spectrum: UK: May 1983; VIC-20: UK: 1983; BBC Micro: UK: 1984
- Genre: Platform
- Mode: Single-player

Jetpac is a platform video game developed and published by Ultimate Play the Game and released for the ZX Spectrum and VIC-20 in 1983 and the BBC Micro in 1984. It is the first game to be released by Ultimate Play the Game, the company which later became Rare. The game follows Jetman as he must rebuild his rocket using a jet pack in order to explore different planets, while simultaneously defending against hostile aliens. It was written by Ultimate co-founder Chris Stamper with graphics designed by his brother, Tim Stamper. Reviewers praised Jetpac's presentation and gameplay, and it won "Game of the Year" at the Golden Joystick Awards in 1983.

Jetpac has since been included as an unlockable minigame in 1999's Donkey Kong 64 and as part of the 2015 compilation Rare Replay. It was later included in a game compilation on the ZX Spectrum Vega. It spawned two direct sequels and a 2007 remake, Jetpac Refuelled, which was released for the Xbox Live Arcade service.

== Gameplay ==
Three rocket sections need to be assembled before Jetman can leave this planet.

The game world is presented in a horizontal wraparound and consists of three platforms which Jetman can manoeuvre onto. Jetman must assemble his rocket (which spawns in pieces scattered around the map), and then fill it with fuel before taking off to the next planet, where the procedure is broadly repeated with alternate procedures. In addition, the player has to defend themselves from the planet's aliens, and for bonus points collect valuable resources which occasionally fall from above.

After the first level, the rocket stays assembled and just requires refuelling. However, every four levels, the rocket resets (giving the player an extra life) and the replacement has to be built before it can be refuelled for takeoff. Each new model has a new design with a higher number written on it, although the core gameplay remains unchanged. The enemies change forms each level (cycling back to the first after eight levels) and each alien has a different pattern of movement which means they can be dealt with in a different manner.

== Development ==
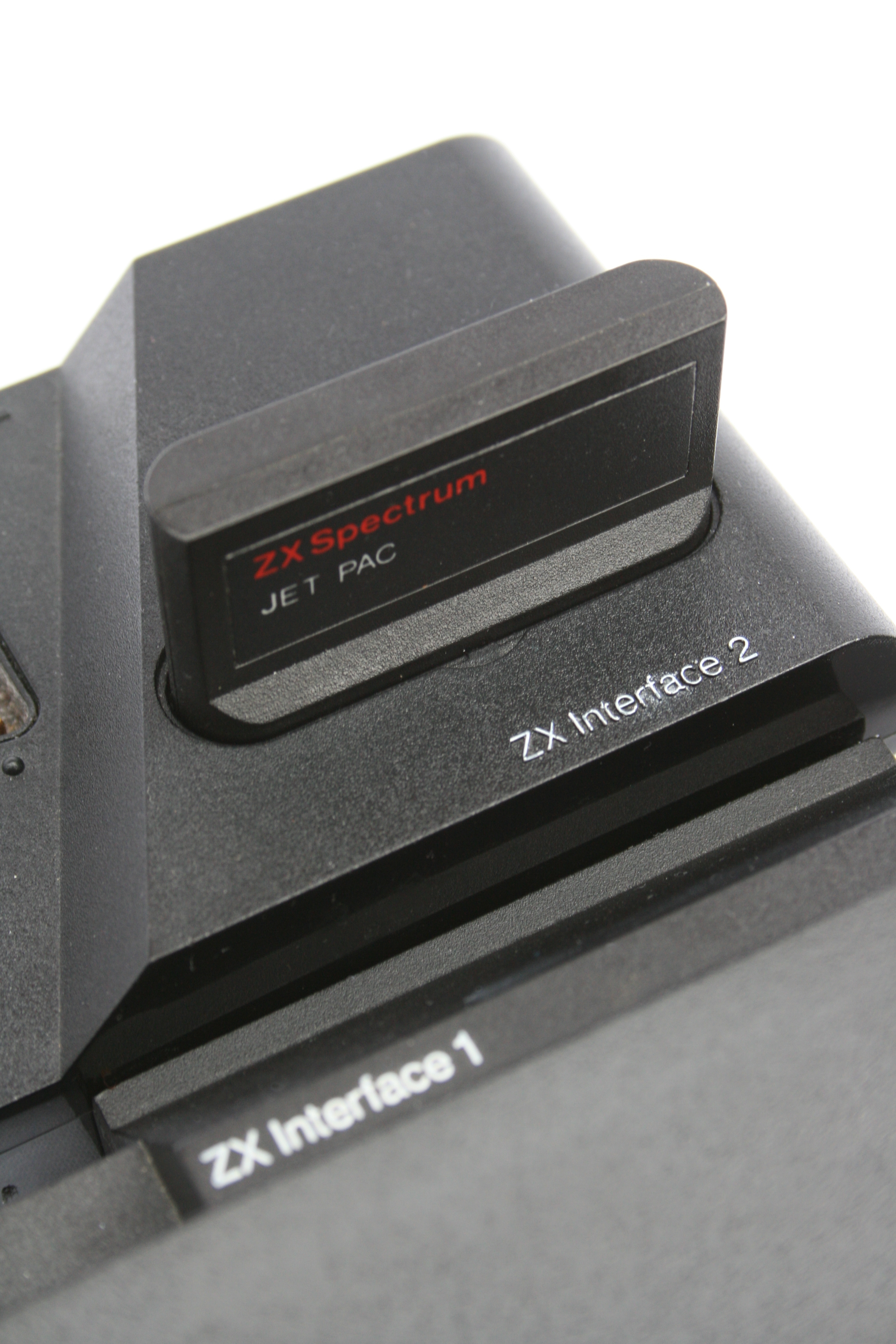
Jet Pac ROM inserted to ZX Interface 2

Ultimate Play the Game was founded by brothers Tim and Chris Stamper, along with Tim's wife, Carol, from their headquarters in Ashby-de-la-Zouch in 1982. The company were known for their reluctance to reveal details about their operations and then-upcoming projects. Little was known about their development process except that they used to work in "separate teams"; one team would work on development whilst the other would concentrate on other aspects such as sound or graphics. While developing Jetpac, the Stamper brothers closely studied the burgeoning Japanese gaming market and had started to practice developing games for their then-upcoming console, the Famicom, later predicting that the ZX Spectrum had a limited lifespan.

Jetpac was one of the few Spectrum games also available in a ROM format for use with the Interface 2, allowing "instantaneous" loading of the game when the normal method of cassette loading took minutes. The game was also able to run on the 16K version of the Spectrum.

== Reception ==
Reception

Review scores
Publication	Score
Crash	Highly recommended
Computer and Video Games	ZX: 9/10; BBC: 9/10
Eurogamer	9/10
Home Computing Weekly	4/5

Award
Publication	Award
Golden Joystick Awards	"Game of the Year" (1983)

The game sold over 300,000 copies and generated £1 million in revenue for Ultimate Play the Game, which enabled the Stamper brothers to gain a foothold in the early video gaming market.

The game was critically acclaimed. Crash praised the graphics and presentation, citing that they were of "the highest standard" and added that it was "difficult to find any real faults" with the game. CVG similarly praised the graphics, stating that the presentation was "superb" and the gameplay was considered addictive. In a retrospective review, Chris Wilkins of Eurogamer noted that the colourful graphics and sound effects were advanced for the time, but what truly made for a "faultless" experience was its simple gameplay.

ZX Computing praised the game's playability and replay value, stating that Jetpac was "a very well put together piece of software". The game was number one in the first Spectrum sales chart published by CVG. The ZX Spectrum version was voted number 73 in the Your Sinclair Readers' Top 100 Games of All Time in 1993 and was voted the 14th best game of all time by the readers of Retro Gamer for an article that was scheduled to be in a special Your Sinclair tribute issue. The game won the title "Game of the Year" at the 1983 Golden Joystick Awards.

== Legacy ==
After the game's release, Jetpac was parodied in a long-running Crash comic strip named Lunar Jetman. The strip, designed by John Richardson, lasted from July 1984 to October 1991 and gained popular reception from readers. To develop the comic, photographs had to be processed manually on a photomechanical tone and then transferred to paper, being fully colourised in the late 1980s.

Jetpac was followed by two sequels: Lunar Jetman (1983) and Solar Jetman (1990). The latter was not released for the ZX Spectrum, instead released for the Nintendo Entertainment System by Nintendo; a version for the Commodore 64 was finished but never released following disappointing sales of the original NES version.

Since its release, Jetpac has been included in a number of other games developed by Rare. The game is playable in Donkey Kong 64, where it can be unlocked to play in Cranky Kong's laboratory after obtaining 15 Banana Medals. Beating Cranky Kong's high score rewards the player with the Rareware Coin, which is necessary to beat the game. The game is retained in Donkey Kong 64's digital re-releases, despite the property being owned by Microsoft since its 2002 acquisition of Rare instead of publisher Nintendo. An enhanced remake of Jetpac, entitled Jetpac Refuelled, was released on the Xbox Live Arcade in March 2007. Microsoft's E3 2015 press conference unveiled the compilation title Rare Replay, which has a selection of thirty games from Rare's lifetime game library, including the original Jetpac and its two sequels and remake, making the Jetman series the most represented in the collection.
