= Stamper brothers =

Video game developers

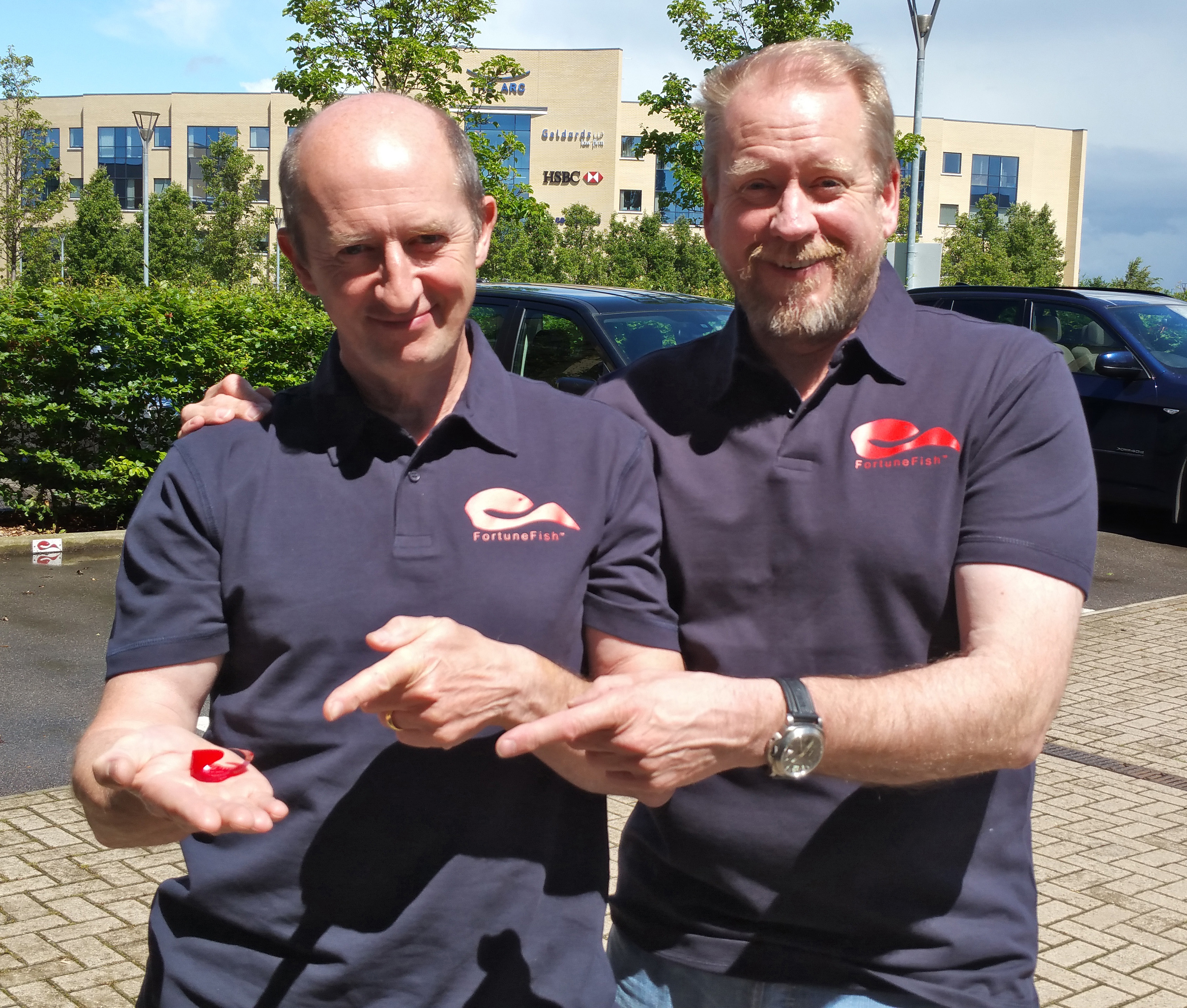
Chris and Tim Stamper in 2015

Brothers Tim and Chris Stamper are British entrepreneurs who founded the video game companies Ultimate Play the Game and Rare. They first worked together on arcade conversion kits, which were licensed to companies, but later became developers for the ZX Spectrum home computer in the early 1980s. Chris programmed the games, while Tim designed the graphics. They found success as Ultimate with games including Jetpac and Knight Lore. After reverse engineering the Nintendo Entertainment System and deciding to shift their focus to console development, the brothers founded Rare in the mid-1980s. They became Nintendo's first major Western developer, for whom they developed licensed games and ports. Over the next two decades, Rare enjoyed a close relationship with Nintendo and developed multiple major titles for the company, including Donkey Kong Country and GoldenEye 007. Microsoft acquired Rare in 2002, and the brothers left the company in 2007.

== Early life ==
Chris Stamper had a long-standing interest in electronics, and he built an oscilloscope in his youth. While at university, he built a kit computer with an 8-bit processor and taught himself how to program by creating traffic light signalling software. He attended Loughborough University of Technology with the intent of earning degrees in electronics and physics, but left the university in 1981 to pursue computer programming full-time. Chris worked with arcade machine electronics, resolving software bugs and converting Space Invaders into Galaxian machines. He persuaded his brother Tim to join him. The brothers worked as game designers at the arcade game company Associated Leisure with a college friend, John Lathbury. They followed the company's director when he started his own business, Zilec Electronics, which worked on arcade conversions. They worked on 12 arcade games, including Gyruss and Blue Print, and others whose names were kept secret and sold to other arcade manufacturers, including Konami and Sega. The job included international travel to Japan, where the brothers became acquainted with the Japanese game industry. During this time, Chris purchased, studied, and taught himself to program the new Z80 processor within two years.

== Ultimate ==
In 1982, the brothers started Ashby Computers and Graphics in the Leicestershire town of Ashby-de-la-Zouch with Lathbury and Tim's girlfriend, Carole Ward, whom he later married in 1985. They worked out of a four-room terraced house next door to the brothers' family corner shop and ran on a shoestring budget for its first six months, in which they pooled their money to pay the bills. The company did not credit individuals on their releases, though they had individual roles in development: Chris and Lathbury programmed and Tim and Carole designed the graphics. Carole also served as the company's secretary. Ultimate Play the Game, as the company was publicly known, first licensed arcade cabinet conversion kits to companies before moving to the more profitable British home computer market.

The brothers primarily developed for the ZX Spectrum, given Chris's expertise with its Z80 processor. Tim would later also develop the concepts behind new intellectual properties. The brothers each had a strong intuition for the elements of a successful game. Ultimate found success with games such as Jetpac (1983), Atic Atac (1983), Sabre Wulf (1984), and Knight Lore (1984), whose expansive experiences exceeded the scope of their contemporary arcade games. The brothers outsourced the programming of their games for other platforms to outside developers, for they preferred the work of making new games over re-programming old ones.

The Stampers were reticent with the press and only rarely gave interviews. They explained that this was both to protect their own time and due to their preference to let their games speak for themselves. Their brand benefitted from this mystique of secrecy, but their reclusiveness was the subject of derision from other UK developers who otherwise greatly respected their work. The Stampers were known for working 18-hour days and believed that part-time work "resulted in a part-time game". They only took two days off: two Christmas mornings. Tim Stamper referred to his custom-built Lamborghini as a token of his hard work.

== Rare ==
In the mid-1980s, following the success of their isometric Filmation game engine behind titles like Knight Lore, the Stampers founded a separate company: Rare Designs of the Future, later shortened to Rare. While Ultimate was built for the British home microcomputer market, Rare was founded with an eye toward the burgeoning Japanese video game console market, having been apprised of Nintendo by their Japanese arcade industry contacts. Nintendo initially rebuffed the brothers' interest in 1983, which led Chris Stamper to study the Nintendo Entertainment System (NES) hardware for six months. The brothers flew to Kyoto to present software samples to Nintendo executives. Nintendo purchased the Stampers' Slalom, which sold half a million units, and made the Stampers into Nintendo's first Western third-party developer. As interest in Filmation and the Spectrum began to wane, the brothers sold part of Ultimate to U.S. Gold and began to focus on Rare, though the Stampers retained a majority stake in Ultimate.

On the NES, Rare worked largely on licensed games and ports from other platforms for several publishers. The lucrative work was largely not innovative, but helped the Stampers learn the console's technology. After reverse engineering the hardware, Chris Stamper's proficiency led him to develop a handheld NES console prototype prior to the release of Nintendo's portable Game Boy. Chris thought that Rare's rural setting—the company was based in a farmhouse in Twycross—was relaxed and refreshing for the game development mindset. The company earned its first million-selling hit for the NES with R.C. Pro-Am in 1988. Chris later reflected that his British peers did not grasp the larger, international video game market, despite having what he considered to be the best talent.

In the mid-1990s, Rare invested in Silicon Graphics computers, which they used to prototype full computer-generated imagery rendering. Excited about this work, Nintendo purchased a quarter stake in Rare, which eventually expanded to 49%, and offered their cast of characters to the company. The Stampers chose Donkey Kong, and their resulting Donkey Kong Country (1994) was immensely successful and a best-seller on the Super Nintendo Entertainment System. Rare's success continued with the Killer Instinct fighting game series and a series of games for Nintendo's Nintendo 64 console in the mid- to late-1990s, including Banjo-Kazooie, Blast Corps, Diddy Kong Racing, Jet Force Gemini, Donkey Kong 64 and GoldenEye 007. The latter became the definitive first-person shooter of the era for home consoles and led to a spiritual sequel, Perfect Dark.

We feel that a 9-to-5 work ethic produces a 9-to-5-type of game.

— Chris Stamper to Bloomberg Businessweek in 1995

Internally at Rare, the Stamper brothers were demanding bosses who continued to work 15-hour days after transitioning into management roles. Chris Stamper continued to code for the company through the mid-90s, while also serving as Rare's chairman and technical director. Tim, the managing director, continued to work on graphics for the company, including backgrounds in Donkey Kong Country. Their younger brother, Stephen, also worked as Rare's operations director. The Stampers encouraged competition between the company's development teams and were involved in the decision-making on every game, even when the company expanded to several hundred employees. A group of employees left in 1997 to work for another Sony-focused studio, while another group left during production for the sequel to GoldenEye. Despite decent reviews, Rare's subsequent games did not appear to meet the high standards of their predecessors, and poor sales led to another staff exodus.

== After Rare ==
After a two-year courtship, Microsoft acquired Rare in 2002, and the Stampers left the company at the beginning of 2007. Tim Stamper's wife continued to work for the company. The brothers were inconspicuous in the public eye for the next decade. Chris Stamper purchased the Eydon Hall estate for £17m in 2004.

A decade later, the brothers invested in FortuneFish, a new Nottingham-based mobile game studio started by Tim Stamper's son. FortuneFish released Kroko Bongo, a rhythm-based platform game, in 2017, whose art and music recalled Rare's signature Donkey Kong Country-era style. The company is one of several new ventures planned by the Stampers. Tim Stamper broke with his reputation for secrecy around the same time by posting publicly on Twitter about Rare's canceled Project Dream.

== Legacy ==
Bloomberg Businessweek described the brothers' software as having "something of a Beatles-scale fandom" in the mid-1980s, and Next Generation named the brothers among the most influential people in the games industry in 1995. Develop recognised the brothers as Development Legends at their 2015 Develop Industry Excellence Awards. The 2015 Ultimate and Rare retrospective Rare Replay features a stamp collection game mechanic, in which the player receives stamps as awards that are used to unlock videos about the companies' past. The choice of "stamps" was in tribute to the Stamper brothers.

== Bibliography ==
- Dawley, Heidi (29 May 1995). "Killer Instinct for Hire". Bloomberg Businessweek. ISSN 0007-7135.
- "Fortress Ultimate". Commodore User. July 1985. pp. 20–21. ISSN 0265-721X.
- Hunt, Stuart (February 2010a). "The Ultimate Hero: A Complete History of Sabreman". Retro Gamer (73): 24–31. ISSN 1742-3155. OCLC 489477015.
- Kean, Roger; Wild, Nik (March 1988). "A Rare Interview with Ultimate Play the Game". The Games Machine. No. 4. pp. 29–36. ISBN 9780307560872. ISSN 0954-8092. OCLC 863378785.
- Kean, Roger (April 1988). "The Best of British: Ultimate Play the Game". Crash. No. 51. pp. 35–38. ISSN 0954-8661.
- Kent, Steve L. (2001). "The Beginning of Rare". The Ultimate History of Video Games: From Pong to Pokémon and Beyond. New York: Three Rivers Press. pp. 289–292. ISBN 0-7615-3643-4.
- Waugh, Eric-Jon Rossel (30 August 2006). "A Short History of Rare". Bloomberg Businessweek. ISSN 0007-7135.
