= Computer and Video Games =

UK magazine and website

- Cover of the first issue of Computer and Video Games
- Categories: Computer magazine
- Frequency: Monthly
- Publisher: EMAP (1981–2001); Dennis Publishing (2001–2004)
- First issue: November 1981
- Final issue: October 2004
- Country: United Kingdom
- Based in: London
- Website: computerandvideogames.com (defunct)
- ISSN: 0261-3697

Computer and Video Games (also known as CVG and similar abbreviations) was a British video game magazine published between 1981 and 2004. Its website launched in 1999 and closed in February 2015. CVG was the longest-running video game media brand in the world. In 2019, several former CVG writers created Video Games Chronicle.

== History ==
Computer and Video Games was established in 1981, being the first British video games magazine. Initially published monthly between November 1981 and October 2004 and solely web-based from 2004 onwards, the magazine was one of the first publications to capitalise on the growing home computing market, although it also covered arcade games. At the time of launch it was the world's first dedicated video games magazine. The first issue featured articles on Space Invaders, Chess, Othello and advice on how to learn programming.

Reviews featured a numerical score, with the highest rated games receiving the "C+VG Hit" award. This logo came to be seen as a selling point for games, big and small. The magazine had a ABC of 106,000 for the second half of 1986. In 1992, the magazine launched, Go!, a handheld gaming supplement bundled with the magazine.

=== Website ===
In early 2014, CVG, amongst other Future-operated websites, was earmarked for closure by management, but instead received staff cuts in July. Future announced the closure of the website in December 2014. The website closed on 26 February 2015, with all pages redirecting to Gamesradar+, another Future publication.

=== YouTube channel ===
Until the closure of CVG, their official YouTube channel provided a variety of video game related content, providing everything from walkthroughs of games to news regarding video game consoles and regarding gaming events. Their second longest running series, GTA V O'clock covered news and conspiracy theories regarding Rockstar Games' Grand Theft Auto V and Grand Theft Auto Online. It was one of the few publications invited to see and play Grand Theft Auto V before its release to the public on 17 September 2013 and re-release for PC on 14 April 2015.

=== CVG Presents ===
CVG Presents
- Cover of issue 1 of CVG Presents
- Categories: Computer magazine
- Frequency: Bi-monthly
- Publisher: Future plc
- First issue: April 2008
- Country: United Kingdom
- Website: ComputerAndVideoGames.com (defunct)

When the magazine reappeared on 16 April 2008 it was in a new form, titled CVG Presents, with a bi-monthly release schedule.

== Golden Joystick Awards ==
CVG hosted the annual Golden Joystick Awards, the longest running gaming ceremony in the world. Originally created in 1982 as the CVG magazine's annual awards ceremony, the awards moved onto the web with CVG.com in 1999.

In April 1983, the magazine published the results of its first Golden Joystick Awards, along with pictures from the ceremony in Berkeley Square. DJ Dave Lee Travis presented the award for best game of the year to Jetpac.
