= Pin Bot (video game) =

1990 video game

- North American cover art
- Developer: Rare
- Publisher: Nintendo
- Directors: Paul Proctor; Tim Stamper
- Designers: Tim Stamper, Paul Proctor
- Programmers: Paul Proctor, Simon Hallam, Chris Stamper
- Artists: Tim Stamper, Kevin Bayliss, Samantha Howell
- Composers: David Wise, Paul Proctor, Carole Stamper
- Platform: Nintendo Entertainment System
- Release: NA: April 1990; EU: January 1991
- Genre: Pinball simulation
- Modes: Single-player, multiplayer

Pin Bot (stylized as Pin*Bot) is a pinball video game developed by Rare and published by Nintendo for the Nintendo Entertainment System. It was released in North America in April 1990. It is a conversion of the pinball machine by the same name (developed and manufactured by Williams in 1986). The NES version of the game accurately reproduces some of the game-play and aesthetics of the pinball machine, while introducing new features and added challenges.

== Gameplay ==
The screen splits to show the ball and the flippers simultaneously.

As the game is played the lower third of the screen always shows the flippers while the rest of the screen scrolls following the ball.

The primary objective of Pin Bot is to score points by hitting targets and completing simple objectives. The rules of the game are for the most part identical to those of the pinball machine: The player starts with a lit marker set on Pluto and advances through the Solar System by hitting various lit targets. Reaching a certain flashing checkpoint planet (Saturn, Jupiter or Mars) awards a Special, which in this version lights an Extra Ball. Reaching the Sun also awards a Special, lighting another Extra Ball.

A 5x5 grid sits in front of Pin Bot's visor, and two banks of targets on the top and side of the grid allow the player to light the grid one or two units at a time. Once the grid is fully lit, the visor opens, allowing the player to lock the ball. Locking a second ball in the visor starts a two-ball multiball mode, during which scores are doubled. The player can then re-lock one of the balls and shoot the other up the Solar Ramp, collecting a bonus score.

In the NES version of the game, successfully scoring a Solar bonus during multiball causes the playfield to change, effectively resulting in six different "levels" of playfield. The shape of the playfield and the locations of all targets remain the same throughout the game, but the playfield's color scheme changes and different enemies begin appearing after Level 1. Level 2 introduces a blob that advances through the planets, then when sitting on top of the Sun lamp, attempts to suck in and eat the ball, spitting out fragments of the ball if successful. In Level 3, a plane flies around the playfield, occasionally holding a missile that drops when the plane is destroyed by the ball or disappears on its own. The missile drops toward one of the flippers, damaging or destroying the flipper if allowed to reach it. Level 4 features the same plane, but the plane can now catch the ball and carry it away. Levels 5 and 6 both introduce a snake that appears in the outlanes and attempts to grab the ball, pulling it into the outlane. In all cases where the ball is "captured" by an enemy, the enemy can be defeated by "shaking" the machine repeatedly.

In addition to changing the playfield, certain bonuses and level advancements also cause the ball to change from a sphere to a triangular wedge, then finally to a cube. Each new shape of ball is faster and more difficult to control than the last, but otherwise behaves identically to the original ball (the physics simulation is not altered).

The NES conversion of Pin Bot reproduces the design and artwork of the pinball machine's playfield and backglass display, as well as its music and many of its sound effects. Additionally, the game plays the synthesized speech of Pin Bot, though gameplay is interrupted while its phrases are being played back. The speech, music and sound effects can each be toggled on and off through a pause menu, accessible via the second controller. (The first controller cannot pause the game since the Start and Select buttons are used to "nudge" the machine.)

== Release and reception ==
The game was shown at the Nintendo booth at CES in January 1990; a prototype version had been shown at the January 1989 CES.

Reception

Review scores
Publication	Score
Computer and Video Games	90%
Nintendo Power	4/5
Mean Machines	90%

Two reviewers for Mean Machines found the ball movement to be realistic. CVG praised the graphics, sound, and gameplay.

== Game engine ==
Rare reused Pin Bot's game engine in another pinball simulation for the NES, High Speed (1991), which is based on Steve Ritchie's pinball machine High Speed (1986). However, Tradewest, rather than Nintendo of America, published the game.

== See also ==
- List of Nintendo Entertainment System games
- Pinball (1984)
- Rollerball (1984)
- Rock 'n Ball (1989)
- Pinball Quest (1989)
