= Snake Rattle 'n' Roll =

1990 video game

- European NES box art
- Developer: Rare
- Publishers: Nintendo (NES); Sega (Mega Drive)
- Designer: Tim Stamper
- Programmer: Mark Betteridge
- Composer: David Wise
- Platforms: Nintendo Entertainment System, Mega Drive
- Release: NES: NA: July 1990; EU: 27 March 1991; Mega Drive: EU: 1993
- Genre: Platform
- Modes: Single-player, multiplayer

Snake Rattle 'n' Roll is a platform video game developed by Rare and published by Nintendo for the Nintendo Entertainment System. It was originally released in North America in July 1990 and in Europe on 27 March 1991. The game features two snakes, Rattle and Roll, as they make their way through eleven 3D isometric levels. A port to the Mega Drive with an extra level was released by Sega in June 1993 exclusively in Europe. Snake Rattle 'n' Roll was developed by Rare members Tim Stamper and Mark Betteridge. The music was composed by David Wise and was inspired by "Shake, Rattle and Roll" and other 1950s-era songs.

The object of the game is to navigate the obstacles in each level and eat enough "Nibbley Pibbleys" to ring a weigh-in bell located in the level, which will allow the snakes to exit. The game can be played by a single player or by two players simultaneously. Snake Rattle 'n' Roll has been named one of the top games released on the NES and one of the top games released by Rare. After the rights to the game was acquired by Microsoft alongside Rare, it was included in Rare's 2015 Rare Replay compilation for Xbox One, and was re-released on the Nintendo Classics service on 21 February 2024. A follow-up for the Game Boy, titled Sneaky Snakes, was released by Tradewest in 1991.

== Gameplay ==
Snake Rattle 'n' Roll features a 3D isometric playing field in which the snakes must avoid obstacles, collect items, and eat "Nibbley Pibbleys".

Snake Rattle 'n' Roll features two snakes (Rattle and Roll) making their way through 11 isometric levels. The object in each level is to eat enough "Nibbley Pibbleys" – small round creatures found throughout each level – to gain enough weight to ring a bell on top of a weighing machine located at the end of the level; this causes a door for the next level to open. Players maneuver their snakes throughout the level with the control pad and are able to pick up Nibbley Pibbleys by lashing their tongue, which can also be used to attack enemies. The snakes' lengths increase when they eat; snakes grow more quickly when they eat Nibbley Pibbleys of their own color, and they grow the most when they eat yellow ones. Located in each level are dispensers which randomly spew out Nibbley Pibbleys; however, they also spew out bombs which can damage the snakes. When a snake reaches a long enough length, the tail begins to flash, which means the snake is heavy enough to exit that level. At that point, they must find and jump on the scale to ring the bell and open the exit door.

Each level contains various obstacles and enemies. Players lose a segment from their snake if they are hit by an enemy, and they lose a life if their snake runs out of segments. Players can also lose a life if their snakes fall too far, the timer runs out, their snakes touch a sharp object, or if they are squashed by an object from above. Also, if they remain in some bodies of water for too long, a shark will attack. The game ends when players lose all their lives, but they have several continues in which they can restart the game from where they left off. Players can defeat enemies by hitting them with their tongues or by jumping on them. Players can collect various items to help them along during gameplay, such as items that extend the length of the snakes' tongues, provide extra lives and continues, add time bonuses, award invisibility diamonds, speed up the snakes, or reverse their directional controls. Located throughout the game are "lids" (in the shape of manhole covers) which players can open to uncover Nibbly Pibbleys, items and extra lives, entrances to bonus levels, and sometimes enemies. Also located in the game are hidden warps which allow players to skip several levels and restart at a later point in the game.

== Development ==
Snake Rattle 'n' Roll was developed primarily by Rare employees Tim Stamper and Mark Betteridge. As with Rare's other NES games, it was executive produced by Howard Phillips, who soon left Nintendo of America in 1991. Stamper worked on the game's graphics and concepts, while Betteridge worked on the game program itself. Most of the ideas behind the game came from Betteridge, who had challenged himself to get the smallest file size for a NES game possible. According to Rare member Brendan Gunn, Betteridge found out how to develop cheap backgrounds that took up little space. After thinking about what and how to move objects on such backgrounds, he came up with the idea for a snake. Much of the game was derived from another isometric video game Marble Madness, of which Rare ported the NES version in 1989. They also used the same type of high-speed scrolling that was used in the NES port of Marble Madness, which, according to a Nintendo Power overview of Rare, "many said couldn't be done on the NES". Rare's future creative director Gregg Mayles started with the company play-testing Snake Rattle 'n' Roll. He recalls being impressed with Betteridge's development of the controls, which he said "felt really responsive".

The game's soundtrack, consisting predominantly of twelve-bar melodies in the early rock-'n'-roll style of the 1954 song "Shake, Rattle and Roll", the name of which is parodied in the game's title, was composed by David Wise. According to website GamesRadar, the game's compositions revolve around 1950s-era "oldies so old they don't even get played on the radio anymore" as of 2010. One sound effect, played when a snake lands in the water and is pursued by a shark until it returns to land, quotes John Williams' two-note theme from the 1975 film Jaws. The soundtracks for the NES and Sega Mega Drive versions were released on vinyl in 2020 by Black Screen Records with liner notes from Wise.

It was first published by Nintendo and released for the Nintendo Entertainment System in North America in July 1990 and in Europe on 27 March 1991. Rare later ported the game to the Sega Mega Drive, a version which was released only in Europe by Sega in October 1993; this port features an additional final level in addition to the 11 levels on the NES version. In that version, the snakes make it into space, but a meteorite crashes into their spaceship, causing them to crash land on another planetoid, which serves at the 12th level. After completing the level, the ending shows the snakes on a new spaceship that is going back home. Although this game was never released for the Game Boy, in level 7 of the NES version, the landscape spells out "NINTENDO GAME BOY". The Sega version spells "SNAKE R+R GO SEGA" in the same place.

== Reception ==
Reception

Review scores
Publication	Score
AllGame	3.5/5
Nintendo Power	4/3/3.5/4
Mean Machines	94%
Video Games	72%
Retro Gamer	91%
Mega	70%

Award
Publication	Award
Game Players	Game Player's NES Excellence Award, 1990

Snake Rattle 'n' Roll first received preview coverage in January 1990 in Nintendo Power magazine. The preview said that the game "defies description" and that it would appeal to people who have enjoyed games such as Q*bert and Adventures of Lolo. The game was featured in the magazine's September–October 1990 issue, which featured a walkthrough of the game's first three levels. It was also featured in UK-based magazine Mean Machines, where it received high praise from editors Matt Regan and Julian Rignall. Regan praised the game's 3D environment, fun gameplay, and level of humor, as noted by the odd objects such as toilet seats. Rignall called the game's graphics "stunning, with beautifully drawn scrolling forced perspective 3D backdrops and some great sprites"; he also lauded the game's playability and simple controls, challenging difficulty, and overall fun factor. Overall, they said Snake Rattle 'n' Roll was "one of the most original games seen in years" and was "a firm favourite here in the MEAN MACHINES offices".

The game received further reviews and praise in other video gaming magazines in 1991. German magazine Video Games called Snake Rattle 'n' Roll "a quaint and original game" that includes high-quality graphics. The reviewer praised the animations in the characters, especially after the snakes eat Nibbly Pibbleys, and he enjoyed the two-player simultaneous mode; however, he said that the game lacked in variety, though the gameplay and challenge remained consistent throughout the course of the game. Another German magazine, Power Play, gave a similar review, and it compared the game to the 1987 Rare game R.C. Pro-Am in gameplay. American video gaming magazine Game Players awarded Snake Rattle 'n' Roll the "Game Player's NES Excellence Award" for 1990 as one of the best games released for the NES that year.

Nintendo Power reviewed Snake Rattle 'n' Roll as part of an overview of NES games which the magazine found were overlooked or otherwise did not sell well. Their main criticism was that the main characters were not recognizable to anyone, giving the game a lack of visibility amongst consumers. Otherwise, they praised the game for its precise controls and for its blend of puzzle and action elements.

Snake Rattle 'n' Roll received some retrospective coverage years after its release. IGN ranked the game at #32 in its "Top 100 NES Games" list, calling it "another of Rare's excellent pre-second-party efforts on the NES" as well as "Marble Madness turned into a platformer". Executive editor Craig Harris also noted the game's high level of difficulty and its excellent soundtrack. UK-based magazine Retro Gamer reviewed the game in its August 2006 issue, calling it one of the best isometric games on the NES and "an essential NES game". The two title characters of the game were named "Hero of the Month" in the magazine's February 2007 issue. In a 25th anniversary retrospective of Rare in December 2010, the same magazine called the game "an excellent platformer" and was one of the games they wished would be released on Kinect; the magazine received a glimpse of a Marble Madness prototype on Kinect and wanted to see the control scheme in that game implemented in a new version of Snake Rattle 'n' Roll. The game was also ranked #23 on a readers' poll of top 25 games made by Rare. UK-based magazine Retro Gamer covered Snake Rattle 'n' Roll as part of its retrospective on isometric video games, saying that the game "merged brilliantly the offbeat nature of games such as Head Over Heels with popular movement-based isometric action/puzzle titles like Marble Madness and Spindizzy". It was also covered in GamesTM's Retro book, where it was lauded as one of the more unheralded games in the NES library. The retrospective highly praised its visuals and landscapes, as well as having a "quirky humour" and a "unique charm". It concluded by saying that Snake Rattle 'n' Roll stands apart from other NES games, as also did other Rare games such as Cobra Triangle and R.C. Pro-Am.

Snake Rattle 'n' Roll, along with several of Rare's other NES games, appears in the Xbox One compilation Rare Replay. The game was re-released via the Nintendo Classics service on February 21, 2024.

== Legacy ==
In Sneaky Snakes players control a snake in side view, as opposed to the original game's isometric view. Visible in this image are an axe that appears when the player has run out of time, as well as the scale found at the end of the level. A "nibbley pibbley" is visible at the bottom of the screen.

In the ending of Snake Rattle 'n' Roll, the game hints at a sequel titled Snakes in Space, but the game was never released. Rare developed a follow-up on the Game Boy titled Sneaky Snakes and the game was published by Tradewest in June 1991. The game features two Snakes named Genghis and Atilla who must save Sonia Snake from the Nasty Nibbler. It has identical gameplay to Snake Rattle 'n' Roll but in a 2D side-scrolling platforming mode instead of the 3D isometric mode. Sneaky Snakes received mediocre ratings from Electronic Gaming Monthly in its July 1991 issue. Reviewer Steve Harris criticized the game for its awkward controls, lack of originality, and a "zero-grav effect" while jumping. Ed Semrad said that the game got old after the first several levels, and Martin Alessi said that while it is an original idea, likewise repeated the previous reviewer's criticism of the game's repetitiveness. Reviewer "Sushi-X" called the game "average" and said: "It lacks the rest of the positive traits that truly rates [sic] an exceptional game".
