= High Speed =

High Speed or high-speed may refer to:

== Films ==
- High Speed (1917 film), starring Jack Mulhall and Fritzi Ridgeway
- High Speed (1920 film), an American drama directed by Charles Miller
- High Speed (1924 film), featuring Herbert Rawlinson and Carmelita Geraghty
- High Speed (1932 film), an American film starring Buck Jones
- High Speed (1986 film), a French film directed by Monique Dartonne and Michel Kaptur
- High Speed, a 2002 British-Italian film starring Paul Nicholls

== Games ==
- High Speed (pinball), a 1986 pinball game
  - The Getaway: High Speed II, a 1992 pinball game
- High Speed (video game), a pinball video game based on Steve Ritchie's 1986 pinball machine

== Music ==
- High Speed E.P., a 1997 release by PAX, a side project of the German band X Marks the Pedwalk
- "High Speed", a song by 2Pac and Outlawz from their 1999 album Still I Rise
- "High Speed", a song by Coldplay from their 1999 EP The Blue Room and their 2000 album Parachutes

== Other uses ==
- High Speed!, a light novel by Kōji Ōji that is the predecessor to the anime series Free!
- High Speed Championship
- High-speed photography
- High Speed Photometer
- High-speed rail
  - High Speed 1, a high-speed railway between London and the Channel Tunnel
  - High Speed 2, a planned high-speed railway between London and various other cities
- High-speed steel
- Monteverdi High Speed
