= BPM: Bullets Per Minute =

2020 video game

- Developer: Awe Interactive
- Publishers: Awe Interactive (Windows); Playtonic Friends (consoles)
- Director: David Jones
- Designer: Josh Sullivan
- Composers: Sam Houghton; Joe Collinson; Reuben Hawthorn
- Engine: Unreal Engine 4
- Platforms: Windows; PlayStation 4; Xbox One; Nintendo Switch
- Release: Windows; September 15, 2020; PS4, Xbox One; October 5, 2021; Switch; September 8, 2022
- Genres: First-person shooter, rhythm, roguelike
- Mode: Single-player

BPM: Bullets Per Minute is a roguelike rhythmic first-person shooter developed and published by Awe Interactive. The game incorporates elements from rhythm games and roguelikes. It was released for Microsoft Windows in September 2020, for PlayStation 4 and Xbox One in October 2021, and for Nintendo Switch in September 2022.

== Gameplay ==
BPM is a first-person shooter in which the player assumes control of a Valkyrie who must combat various monstrous creatures across different realms. The player can choose from ten characters, each of whom has their own unique abilities, strengths and weaknesses. Similar to rhythm games such as Crypt of the NecroDancer, the players must use abilities, reload, and shoot their weapons on beat to the game's heavy metal background music. As with many rhythm games, each successful beat match boosts a score multiplier, while their guns will misfire if the player loses the beat. The game features dungeons that are procedurally generated, and the player must defeat seven different bosses in order to finish the game.

== Development ==
The game was developed by Awe Interactive, which was a two-person team based in the UK. The game was inspired by early first-person shooters such as Doom and Quake, while some of the gameplay mechanics were influenced by Crypt of the NecroDancer and Cuphead. Originally the team wanted to use music from various artists, but they decided to work exclusively with Sam Houghton and Joe Collinson after hearing their work. The game is powered by Epic Games' Unreal Engine, and used assets from their cancelled project, Paragon. One of Paragon's characters, Sevarog, appears in the game.

The game was published by Playtonic Friends, the publishing arm of Playtonic Games, the developer behind Yooka-Laylee. The game was released for Windows on September 16, 2020. The game was released for PlayStation 4 and Xbox One on October 5, 2021, and was released for Nintendo Switch on September 8, 2022.

== Reception ==
Reception

Aggregate scores
Aggregator	Score
Metacritic	(PC) 74/100 (PS4) 80/100
OpenCritic	54%

Review scores
Publication	Score
Nintendo Life	6/10
PC Gamer (US)	68/100
The Guardian	4/5

According to review aggregator platform Metacritic, the Windows version received "mixed or average" reviews while the PlayStation 4 version received "generally favorable reviews".
