= Demon Turf =

2021 video game

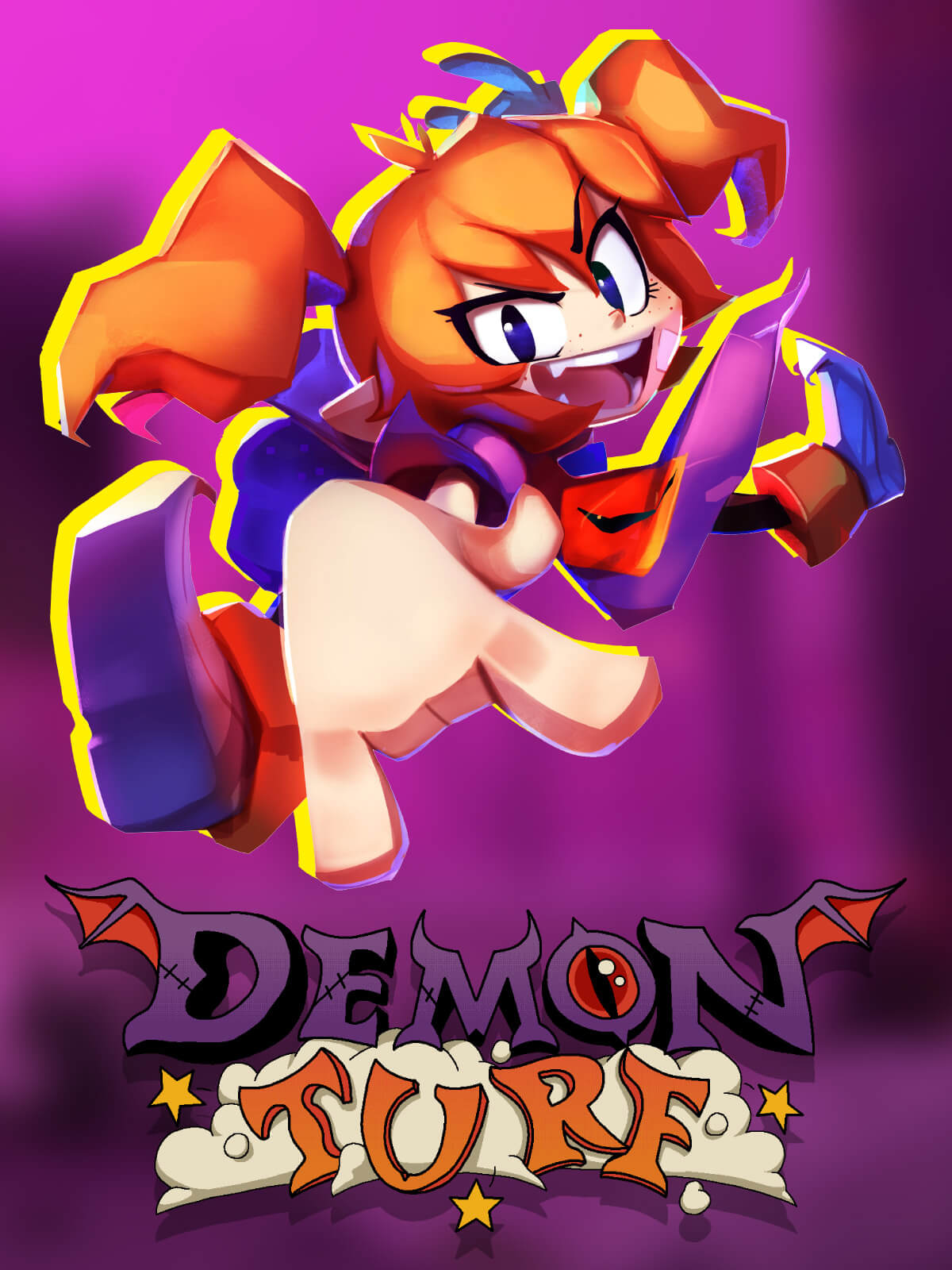
- Developer: Fabraz
- Publisher: Playtonic
- Director: Fabian Rastorfer
- Producer: Fabian Rastorfer
- Designers: Fabian Rastorfer; Ben Miller; Edgar Castro
- Artists: Fabian Rastorfer; "Miimows"
- Writer: Fabian Rastorfer
- Composers: "Fat Bard"; M.R. Miller
- Engine: Unity
- Platforms: Microsoft Windows; Nintendo Switch; PlayStation 4; PlayStation 5; Xbox One; Xbox Series X/S
- Release: November 4, 2021
- Genres: Platform, action-adventure
- Mode: Single-player

Demon Turf is a 3D platformer action-adventure game developed by Fabraz and published by Playtonic Friends. The game was released November 4, 2021 on Microsoft Windows, Nintendo Switch, PlayStation 4, PlayStation 5, Xbox One, and Xbox Series X/S. A follow-up game, Demon Turf: Neon Splash was released in 2022, and another title, Demon Tides, was released in 2026.

== Gameplay ==
Demon Turf is a platform action-adventure game set in an open world environment and played from a third-person perspective. The player takes control of Beebz, a young demon girl, and travels between four different worlds called "Turfs", each of which is separated into separate levels. The objective of every level is to find and steal a "Battery", and every level has three "Sweets" hidden in them as a secondary objective. Instead of direct combat, Beebz is able to use her projectile to push enemies off of the level or into spikes in order to defeat them. Beebz is also capable of learning new special abilities called "Turf Abilities" that expand her platforming capabilities, such as allowing her to take flight or slow time in a localized area. Demon Turf has elements of a "collectathon", with a "Photo Hunt" mode where the player is encouraged to take pictures of specific objects in the game world.

The game has no checkpoints, instead giving the player the ability to decide when and where to set one of three different Checkpoint Flags that they can teleport to and respawn at.

== Development ==
The game was conceived by Fabraz studio head Fabian Restorfer. Fabian said in an interview with IGN that the studio felt content that they done everything they wanted to do with 2D platformers with their previous game, Slime-san, but they were not entirely sure they fully explored everything that a platformer can be. Demon Turf started development as a 2.5D platformer, and a successor to Slime-san before being finalized into its current form. The game was programmed by Fabraz studio's head programmer, Ben Miller. It was developed using the Unity Engine.

=== Demon Turf Trials ===
In the lead up to the launch of the full Demon Turf game, Fabraz studios released an extended demo of the game called Demon Turf Trials. In addition to containing the first three levels of the game, Demon Turf Trials also featured a special "Trials Mode" where players could compete to get the best time in specially designed weekly challenges. The player with the best time every week will get a portrait of themselves, a pet, or a family member in the Demon Turf video game.

== Reception ==
Reception

Aggregate score
Aggregator	Score
Metacritic	PC: 68/100; NS: 76/100; PS5: 75/100; XSXS: 75/100

Review scores
Publication	Score
Destructoid	5.5/10
Hardcore Gamer	3.5/5
MeriStation	7.2/10
Nintendo Life	8/10
Nintendo World Report	8/10
Push Square	7/10
Video Games Chronicle	3/5
Metro	8/10

Demon Turf received "generally favorable" reviews for most platforms according to review aggregator platform Metacritic; the Windows version received "mixed or average" reviews. Nintendo World Report noted in their review that combat felt less integrated in the game than some other mechanics. Destructoid was more critical, citing the art style as one of the few strong parts of the game that was also unique.

== Sequel ==
A followup game, Demon Turf: Neon Splash was released on April 14, 2022.

A sequel, titled Demon Tides, was released on February 19, 2026.
