= Time Lord (video game) =

1990 video game

- Developer: Rare
- Publisher: Milton Bradley
- Composer: David Wise
- Platform: NES
- Release: NA: September 1990; EU: 1991
- Genres: Action, platforming
- Mode: Single-player

Time Lord is a side-scrolling action-platform video game developed by Rare and published by Milton Bradley for the Nintendo Entertainment System. It was released in North America in September 1990 and in Europe in 1991.

The game opens with a military conflict between the planets Earth and Drakkon in the year 2999. In an attempt to alter the course of human history, the Drakkon forces launch time-traveling alien invasions into four different eras of the past. An unnamed Time Lord travels into the past to face the invaders. The four battles take place in the years 1250, 1650, 1860, and 1943. The respective locations for these battles are Medieval England, the Western United States shortly before the American Civil War, the Caribbean, and France during World War II.

== Plot ==
In the year 2999, Earth is under siege by aliens from the planet Drakkon. Using time travel technology, they have sent armies to four periods in human history, with the intention of altering history to make humankind easier to conquer in the present. The player assumes control of the "Time Lord", who has until January 1, 3000 AD to vanquish the enemy in the past, or else, he will self-destruct along with the time machine.

== Gameplay ==
The first level of Time Lord.

The player begins in the MB Time Travel Research Centre, then progresses through four levels based on periods in human history (Medieval England 1250 AD, Western United States 1860 AD, Caribbean 1650 AD, and France 1943 AD). After the Drakkon forces have been eliminated, the player returns to the present to do battle with the Drakkon King.

The game features oblique graphics to simulate 3D terrain. The Time Lord can jump, punch, and use period weapons such as swords and guns. To progress from level to level, the player must acquire five golden orbs with which to power the time machine. In the era levels, four of the five orbs are scattered throughout each level, with the fifth being relinquished after defeating a Drakkon Lord (boss).

The aforementioned year 3000 deadline is in effect in game. One day in present time transpires in six seconds, meaning the player has 36 minutes and 30 seconds of gameplay time to complete the game or the game is lost. The time limit remains in effect even when the player has returned to the present.

The player is not granted any continues but may obtain extra lives. Depending on the time period the player is in, weapons such as swords, throwing knives, firearms, grenades, and laser weaponry can be used. The player begins each level unarmed, but can acquire these weapons by collecting giftwrapped packages.

== Reception ==
Reception

Review score
Publication	Score
AllGame	1.5/5

Allgame's Christopher Michael Baker was critical of Time Lord. He referred to the gameplay as dull and repetitive, citing that most people would not have the patience to finish the game.
