= David Wise (composer) =

English video game composer

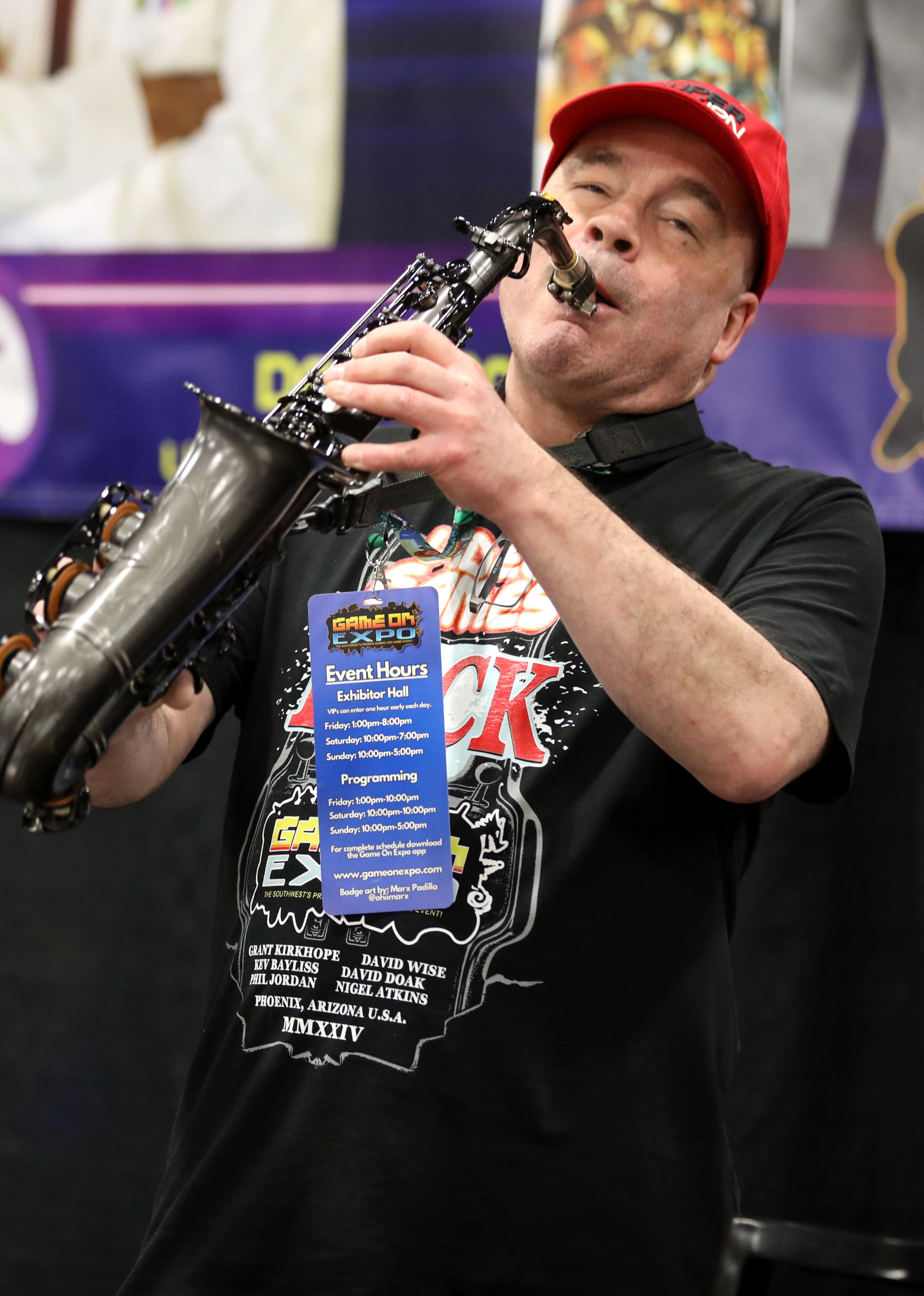
- Wise in 2024

Background information
- Also known as: Dave Wise
- Born: Coalville, Leicestershire, England
- Genre: Video game music
- Occupations: Composer, musician
- Instruments: Synthesizer, piano, saxophone
- Years active: 1985–present
- Label: Brave Wave Productions
- Website: davidwise.co.uk

David Wise is a British video game music composer and musician. He was a composer at Rare from 1985 to 2009, and he was the company's sole musician up until 1994. He has gained a dedicated following for his work on various games, particularly Nintendo's Donkey Kong Country series. Wise is known for his atmospheric style of music, mixing natural environmental sounds with prominent melodic and percussive accompaniment.

== Career and influences ==
Wise has said that he has had a wide range of musical influences. The first instrument he learned to play was the piano, before later learning the trumpet, and learning to play the drums during adolescence. He played in a few bands during his youth, and he was active in a band as of 2004.

=== (1985–2009): Career with Rare ===
Wise's career at Rare began when he happened to meet its two founders while; as he explained in response to a question posted on its company website: "I was working in a music shop demonstrating a Yamaha CX5 Music Computer to a couple of people, Tim & Chris Stamper. I'd written and programmed the music for the demonstration material. They offered me a job."

The very first game the Wise composed music for was the 1986 NES skiing game Slalom.

While working at Rare, Wise gained attention and acclaim for his work on the Donkey Kong Country series. In addition to the percussive and ambient 'jungle' influences that serve as a thematic undercurrent for much of the series, the games feature a wide variety of different musical styles that are reflective of the various areas and environments they appear in.

The song "Aquatic Ambience" from Donkey Kong Country has particularly attracted people's attention. Wise said was inspired by a failed relationship.

In the January 1996 issue of Electronic Gaming Monthly, Wise stated that his travelling experiences largely shaped the sound and mood of each Donkey Kong soundtrack, further saying that the music for Donkey Kong Country 2: Diddy's Kong Quest was composed during what he called his "experimental Paris phase". Rather than compose the Donkey Kong soundtracks using standardized MIDI instruments, Wise coded customized instruments to realize his vision for the Donkey Kong soundtracks, leading him to be described by Pitchfork's Billie Bugara as Rare's "most ambitious composer".

In the book Playing with Super Power, some influences for the music of Donkey Kong Country were mentioned. Specifically, Koji Kondo's work on the Super Mario and The Legend of Zelda series; the Super Nintendo Entertainment System game Plok, composed by Tim Follin and Geoff Follin; and synthesized film scores and rock and dance music from the early 1980s. Wise composed the soundtrack for the Game Boy Advance port of Donkey Kong Country 3: Dixie Kong's Double Trouble!.

Wise composed the music for the GameCube game Star Fox Adventures which was released on September 23, 2002, and was Nintendo's final project with Rare before ending their partnership.

In October 2009, it was announced by the OverClocked ReMix community that Wise was remixing a track for Serious Monkey Business, an unofficial Donkey Kong Country 2 remix album. Grant Kirkhope and Robin Beanland collaborated on this track, playing guitar and trumpet respectively. On 15 March 2010, Serious Monkey Business was released and Wise's track, "Re-Skewed", was featured as track No. 33. Much like his contribution to Serious Monkey Business, Wise later remixed one of his own compositions, the GBA version of "Jungle Jitter", for an unofficial Donkey Kong Country 3 remix album titled Double the Trouble!, which was released on 1 December 2012. Wise also provided a saxophone solo for another remix, in addition to mixing and mastering the track.

=== (2009–Present) Freelance career ===
On 14 November 2009, Wise announced his resignation from Rare, feeling that the company had "changed a great deal" and there was no longer an opportunity to create music tracks that Rare is most known for. In December 2010, Wise created a personal studio called the "David Wise Sound Studio". In June 2013, it was announced that he would be composing for Donkey Kong Country: Tropical Freeze, after receiving a call from Retro Studios president Michael Kelbaugh, who previously worked at Rare. Wise composed for Yooka-Laylee along with Kirkhope and Steve Burke.

== Works ==
| Year | Title | Notes |
|---|---|---|
| 1987 | Slalom | |
| 1987 | Wizards & Warriors | |
| 1988 | R.C. Pro-Am | |
| 1988 | Wheel of Fortune | |
| 1988 | Jeopardy! | |
| 1988 | Anticipation | |
| 1989 | Marble Madness | |
| 1989 | World Games | |
| 1989 | WWF WrestleMania | |
| 1989 | John Elway's Quarterback | |
| 1989 | California Games | |
| 1989 | Taboo: The Sixth Sense | |
| 1989 | Sesame Street ABC | |
| 1989 | Hollywood Squares | |
| 1989 | Who Framed Roger Rabbit | |
| 1989 | Jordan vs. Bird: One on One | |
| 1989 | Cobra Triangle | |
| 1989 | Ironsword: Wizards & Warriors II | |
| 1989 | Wheel of Fortune Junior Edition | |
| 1989 | Jeopardy! Junior Edition | |
| 1989 | Silent Service | |
| 1990 | Double Dare | |
| 1990 | Wheel of Fortune Family Edition | |
| 1990 | Jeopardy! 25th Anniversary Edition | |
| 1990 | Captain Skyhawk | |
| 1990 | Digger T. Rock | |
| 1990 | Pin*Bot | |
| 1990 | Snake Rattle 'n' Roll | |
| 1990 | NARC | |
| 1990 | A Nightmare on Elm Street | |
| 1990 | Super Glove Ball | |
| 1990 | Cabal | |
| 1990 | Time Lord | |
| 1990 | Arch Rivals | |
| 1990 | WWF WrestleMania Challenge | |
| 1990 | Solar Jetman: Hunt for the Golden Warpship | |
| 1990 | The Amazing Spider-Man | |
| 1990 | Wizards & Warriors Chapter X: The Fortress of Fear | |
| 1990 | Super Off Road | |
| 1991 | Sesame Street ABC & 123 | |
| 1991 | Battletoads (Game Boy) | |
| 1991 | Super R.C. Pro-Am | |
| 1991 | Sneaky Snakes | |
| 1991 | WWF Superstars | |
| 1991 | Battletoads | |
| 1991 | Beetlejuice | |
| 1991 | High Speed | |
| 1992 | Wizards & Warriors III | |
| 1992 | Danny Sullivan's Indy Heat | |
| 1992 | R.C. Pro-Am II | |
| 1992 | Championship Pro-Am | |
| 1993 | Battletoads & Double Dragon | |
| 1993 | Battletoads in Battlemaniacs | |
| 1993 | X The Ball | |
| 1994 | Battletoads Arcade | |
| 1994 | Monster Max | |
| 1994 | Donkey Kong Country | With Robin Beanland and Eveline Fischer |
| 1995 | Donkey Kong Land | With Graeme Norgate |
| 1995 | Donkey Kong Country 2: Diddy's Kong Quest | |
| 1996 | Donkey Kong Land 2 | DKC 2 soundtrack converted to the Game Boy by Grant Kirkhope. |
| 1996 | Donkey Kong Country 3: Dixie Kong's Double Trouble! | With Fischer. Wrote new soundtrack for 2005 GBA port. |
| 1997 | Diddy Kong Racing | |
| 1999 | Mickey's Racing Adventure | |
| 2000 | Donkey Kong Country (GBC version) | With Beanland and Fischer |
| 2001 | Super Smash Bros. Melee | Original Game Staff |
| 2002 | Star Fox Adventures | With Ben Cullum. |
| 2004 | It's Mr. Pants | With Beanland and Fischer ("Squeaky Pants") |
| 2005 | Donkey Kong Country 3 GBA | |
| 2007 | Diddy Kong Racing DS | |
| 2008 | Viva Piñata: Pocket Paradise | |
| 2008 | War World | Xbox 360 version |
| 2008 | Banjo-Kazooie: Nuts & Bolts | The Rare Family |
| 2013 | Sorcery! | |
| 2014 | Tengami | |
| 2014 | Donkey Kong Country: Tropical Freeze | With Kenji Yamamoto |
| 2015 | Rare Replay | Special thanks |
| 2015 | Star Drift | |
| 2016 | Star Ghost | |
| 2017 | Snake Pass | |
| 2017 | Yooka-Laylee | With Grant Kirkhope and Steve Burke |
| 2019 | Yooka-Laylee and the Impossible Lair | With Grant Kirkhope, Dan Murdoch and Matt Griffin |
| 2020 | Battletoads | Original themes, special thanks |
| 2020 | Tamarin | With Graeme Norgate |
| 2023 | Everhood: Eternity Edition | |
| 2023 | Ratatan | |
| 2024 | Nikoderiko: The Magical World | |
| 2024 | Gimmick! 2 | |
| 2025 | Lucid | |
| 2025 | 99 Fails | With Pawel Pachniewski |
| 2025 | Yooka-Replaylee | With Grant Kirkhope, Steve Burke, Matt Griffin and Daniel Murdoch |

=== Cancelled ===
| Title | Publisher | Platform |
|---|---|---|
| Harmony | Nintendo / Retro Studios | Nintendo Switch |
