= Super R.C. Pro-Am =

1991 video game

- North American cover art
- Developer: Rare
- Publisher: Nintendo
- Composer: David Wise
- Platform: Game Boy
- Release: NA: June 1991; EU: 23 April 1992
- Genre: Racing
- Modes: Single-player, multiplayer

Super R.C. Pro-Am is a racing video game developed by Rare and published by Nintendo for the Game Boy. It was released in North America in June 1991 and in Europe on 23 April 1992; it was re-released in 1998 as part of Nintendo's Player's Choice series, which included all Game Boy titles which sold over one million copies. It is the follow-up to the Nintendo Entertainment System title R.C. Pro-Am, in which players race remote control cars from an out-of-vehicle perspective on a series of 24 tracks, avoiding obstacles and collecting items to improve performance in order to finish in the top three and qualify for the next track. The game can be played solo against three computer opponents, or two to four players can play simultaneously via the Game Link Cable or the Four Player Adapter.

Super R.C. Pro-Am received moderate coverage from some video gaming magazines. It was praised for its graphics and sound, controls, challenge, and ability for up to four players to play the game simultaneously. Criticisms included repetitiveness in gameplay, lack of variety, and rapid scrolling on the Game Boy that may cause players to miss some items. It was featured on Nintendo Power's "Top 20" Game Boy list for most of 1992.

== Gameplay ==
Super R.C. Pro-Am is a racing video game that is similar to its predecessor, R.C. Pro-Am, for the NES. In the game, players race remote control cars on a series of tracks. It can be played solo, with two-players via the Game Link Cable, or with three or four players via the Four Player Adapter. The game features 24 different tracks of increasing difficulty, and the object is to finish in the top three in order to qualify to race in the next track. Players who do not finish in the top three may use a continue and retry the track; players get three continues, and the game ends when the player fails to finish in the top three and has no continues remaining.

The 1st place player is about to collect the letter "E" to try to spell "Nintendo".

Each track is different and range from standard ovals to tracks with many twists and turns. The game includes many obstacles, such as oil slicks that send players spinning, puddles of water that cause players to slide out of control, sand traps and "slow cones" that slow players down, large cones that bring players to a complete halt, and walls of tires that players bounce off. If a player hits an oil slick and then hits a wall while spinning, the player's car is temporarily destroyed, which loses time. The tracks also has items that help players along the way: "zippers" (a series of chevrons on the track) give players a speed boost, roll cages allow players to hit walls without being destroyed and allow them to crash opponents by forcing them into walls, and missiles and bombs temporarily destroy opponents' cars. Also on the track are spare parts which help improve performance – tires improve traction, batteries increase acceleration, and engines improve speed.

Players have the opportunity to upgrade their vehicles by collecting letters, which are distributed throughout the tracks. By spelling "Nintendo" with the letters, players upgrade to a better vehicle; players can upgrade from the "Racer" to the "Speed demon" and then to the Spiker, each of which performs progressively better than the previous vehicle. If players spell "Nintendo" while racing with the Spiker, then they win the game.

== Release ==
Super R.C. Pro-Am was developed by UK-based video game company Rare and was released for Nintendo's Game Boy handheld console. It was first mentioned in video gaming magazine Nintendo Power in February 1991, along with Game Boy versions of Nintendo World Cup, Ultima: Runes of Virtue, and The Sword of Hope. It was mentioned again in the following issue in March 1991, along with Skate or Die: Tour de Thrash; they mentioned that Rare was attempting to recapture the same feel from its Nintendo Entertainment System predecessor, R.C. Pro-Am. It was released in North America in June 1991 and in Europe on 23 April 1992.

== Reception ==
Reception

Review scores
Publication	Score
ACE	887/1000
Game Players	6/10
GamePro	3/5; 3/5; 4/5; 4/5; 3/5
HobbyConsolas	89/100
Joystick	93%
Player One	89%
Total!	87%
Super Gamer	84%

Nintendo Power praised Super R.C. Pro-Am for its graphics and sound, saying that "Rare has really captured the sounds of high-revving engines and tires trying to hold the track". They also praised the ability for up to four players to play the game simultaneously, saying that players cannot depend on their human opponents to do the same things computer opponents do, and that human opponents can fire back at them (while computer opponents cannot). It would be on the magazine's "Top 20" Game Boy list for most of 1992; it debuted at #6 on the January 1992 list, when the magazine switched from the "Top 30" list for the NES and "Top 5" list for Game Boy to "Top 20" lists for the NES, Game Boy and the Super NES. It then went to #8 in February, #10 in March, and back to #8 in April. From May through October 1992, it was in the teens on the Game Boy list, finishing at #11 in May, #18 in June, #17 in July and August, #18 in September, and #15 in October. It dropped off the list afterwards.

Super R.C. Pro-Am was reviewed alongside Mega Man: Dr. Wily's Revenge in UK-based computer gaming magazine ACE (Advanced Computer Entertainment). Reviewer David Upchurch praised the game for its fluid graphics and scrolling, good controls, and "long-term challenge". He also lauded the ability to play simultaneously with two to four human players, saying that "this transforms the game from a fun diversion into an addictive obsession". Criticisms included lack of variety in the tracks and an "annoyingly grating sound". GamePro praised the game for its easy-to-see graphics and multiplayer ability, but it criticized the lack of speed. German magazine Power Play primarily praised the game for the multiplayer features. The magazine criticized the game for its repetitiveness in gameplay and the rapid scrolling that may cause players to miss items on the track. Super R.C. Pro-Am was re-released in 1998 as part of Nintendo's Player's Choice series, which included all Game Boy titles that sold over one million copies.
