= Playtonic Games =

British independent video game developer

Playtonic Limited
- Type: Private
- Industry: Video games
- Founded: 12 August 2014; 12 years ago
- Founders: Steve Hurst; Steve Mayles; Gavin Price; Jens Restemeier; Mark Stevenson; Chris Sutherland
- Headquarters: Burton upon Trent, England
- Key people: Gavin Price (managing director)
- Divisions: Playtonic Friends
- Website: playtonicgames.com

Playtonic Games is a British video game developer founded in 2014. It consists in large part of former members of Rare.

== History ==
Playtonic Games was founded on 12 August 2014 by Steve Hurst, Steve Mayles, Gavin Price, Jens Restemeier, Mark Stevenson, and Chris Sutherland, all of whom previously worked at Rare. Of the founders, Price assumed the role of studio head. They were joined by Grant Kirkhope and Steven Hurst. The first game the company worked on was codenamed "Project Ukulele", which was described as a spiritual successor to Banjo-Kazooie. The team launched a Kickstarter campaign for the project, and it managed to reach the stretch goal of US$1 million within 24 hours. In part due to the campaign's success, the team's attention was often diverted to other aspects such as making merchandise items instead of focusing on game's development, and some choices related to game development were forced as well due to them being promised in the campaign.

Project Ukulele was unveiled as the 3D platformer Yooka-Laylee, which was released in 2017 to mixed critical reviews. Playtonic followed up on Yooka-Laylee with Yooka-Laylee and the Impossible Lair, its second game, a 2.5D spinoff. While bearing similarities with the Donkey Kong Country series, the team opted not to use the moniker "spiritual successor" to market the game, unlike with Yooka-Laylee. Yooka-Laylee and the Impossible Lair was released in 2019 to a more positive reception than Yooka-Laylee.

Playtonic Games announced the rebranding of its company name to "Playtonic" and the launch of a publishing division, Playtonic Friends, in February 2021, with three titles under development from partner studios Awe Interactive, Fabraz, and Okidokico. On 26 March 2021, Playtonic Friends revealed its first game, Demon Turf, developed by Fabraz. On 29 April 2021, Playtonic Friends announced its next game, BPM: Bullets Per Minute, would be released in 2021 for PlayStation 4 and Xbox One. On 19 May 2021, Playtonic announced A Little Golf Journey, to be released on PCs and Nintendo Switch and developed by Okidokico.

Tencent acquired a minority stake in Playtonic in November 2021.

== Games developed ==
Year	Game	Platforms	Publisher
2017	Yooka-Laylee	Amazon Luna, Linux, macOS, Nintendo Switch, PlayStation 4, Windows, Xbox One	Team17
2019	Yooka-Laylee and the Impossible Lair	Amazon Luna, Nintendo Switch, PlayStation 4, Windows, Xbox One	Team17
2025	Yooka-Replaylee	Nintendo Switch 2, PlayStation 5, Windows, Xbox Series X/S	Playtonic Friends, PM Studios
TBA	Super Yooka-Laylee Kart	Windows	Playtonic Friends

== Games published ==
The games below were published under the name Playtonic Friends.

Year	Game	Platforms	Developer
2021	Demon Turf	Nintendo Switch, PlayStation 4, PlayStation 5, Windows, Xbox One, Xbox Series X/S	Fabraz
2021	BPM: Bullets Per Minute	Nintendo Switch, PlayStation 4, Xbox One	Awe Interactive
2021	A Little Golf Journey	Nintendo Switch, Windows	Okidokico
2022	Lil Gator Game	Nintendo Switch, PlayStation 4, PlayStation 5, Windows, Xbox One, Xbox Series X/S	Megawobble
2022	Blossom Tales II: The Minotaur Prince	Nintendo Switch, Windows, Xbox One, Xbox Series X/S	Castle Pixel
2022	Demon Turf: Neon Splash	Nintendo Switch, Windows	Fabraz
2024	CorpoNation: The Sorting Process	Nintendo Switch, Windows, Xbox One, Xbox Series X/S	Canteen
2024	Elsie	Nintendo Switch, PlayStation 5, Windows	Knight Shift Games
2024	Victory Heat Rally	Android, iOS, Nintendo Switch, Windows	Skydevilpalm
2025	Dunk Dunk	Nintendo Switch, Windows	Badgerhammer
2025	Cattle Country	Nintendo Switch, PlayStation 5, Windows, Xbox Series X/S	Castle Pixel
