= Yooka-Laylee and the Impossible Lair =

2019 video game

- Developer: Playtonic Games
- Publisher: Team17
- Composers: Matt Griffin; David Wise; Daniel Murdoch; Grant Kirkhope
- Engine: Unity
- Platforms: Nintendo Switch; PlayStation 4; Windows; Xbox One
- Release: Switch, PS4, Windows, Xbox One; October 8, 2019; Luna; October 20, 2020
- Genre: Platform
- Mode: Single-player

Yooka-Laylee and the Impossible Lair is a platform game developed by Playtonic Games and published by Team17 in 2019. A spin-off to Yooka-Laylee (2017), the game was released digitally for Nintendo Switch, PlayStation 4, Windows, and Xbox One on October 8, 2019, followed by a version for Amazon Luna on October 20, 2020.

== Gameplay ==
The title is a side-scrolling 2D platform game. The player controls Yooka, a male chameleon, and Laylee, a female bat, to complete various levels. In these levels, the objective is to collect quills and T.W.I.T. coins, as well as to free a member of the "Beetalion". The members of the Beetalion each give Yooka and Laylee an extra hit point for use on the final level, the eponymous "Impossible Lair". T.W.I.T. coins are used to unlock further progress on the overworld through Trowzer's "paywalls". Notably, it is possible to enter the final level at any point in the game, though it is heavily encouraged that the player first secure extra hit points by beating the other levels first.

The "Tonics" feature from the first game also return. Tonics are potions that can modify the gameplay in numerous ways after being consumed by Yooka. Between levels, an isometric 3D overworld is used for getting around. Characters can be found and spoken to alongside puzzles to solve for quills and tonics.

== Development ==
Yooka-Laylee and the Impossible Lair was developed by Playtonic Games, a studio composed of former Rare employees. While the game bears similarities with the Donkey Kong Country series, the team opted not to use the moniker "spiritual successor" to market the game. The game was announced on June 8, 2019, by publisher Team17, and released on October 8, 2019.

Yooka-Laylee and the Impossible Lair (Original Game Soundtrack) was independently released by Playtonic on October 16, 2019, on Bandcamp, with a fully distributed edition under the video game record label Materia Collective. The music was composed by David Wise, Grant Kirkhope, Matt Griffin, and Dan Murdoch.

== Reception ==
Reception

Aggregate scores
| Aggregator | Score |
|---|---|
| Metacritic | NS: 81/100; PC: 81/100; PS4: 82/100; XONE: 84/100 |
| OpenCritic | 82% recommend |

Review scores
| Publication | Score |
|---|---|
| Destructoid | 7/10 |
| Game Informer | 8.5/10 |
| GameSpot | 6/10 |
| IGN | 8.7/10 |
| Jeuxvideo.com | 16/20 |
| Nintendo Life | 9/10 |
| Nintendo World Report | 8/10 |
| PlayStation Official Magazine – UK | 7/10 |
| Official Xbox Magazine (UK) | 9/10 |

Yooka-Laylee and the Impossible Lair received generally positive reviews upon release according to review aggregator website Metacritic. Fellow review aggregator OpenCritic assessed that the game received strong approval, being recommended by 82% of critics. IGN gave the game a glowing review, calling it an "excellent modernized spin on the 2D platformer". Game Informer also spoke highly, praising the game's great replay value and fresh perspective on the 2D platforming genre. Eurogamer's Tom Phillips called the game "a far more polished game than the studio's predecessor", citing the more modern game designs.

Despite the game's mainly positive reviews, some journalists found issues with the game's design. Destructoid's Brett Makedonski, while having enjoyed the game overall, described the levels and controls as "not innovative" and "good enough". Hayden Dingman of PC World found the game's difficulty too "taxing" to be enjoyable, giving it 3/5 stars.

=== Accolades ===
The game was nominated for "Control Precision" at the NAVGTR Awards.
