= R.C. Pro-Am II =

1992 racing video game

- Developer: Rare
- Publisher: Tradewest
- Artist: Chris Peil
- Composer: David Wise
- Platform: Nintendo Entertainment System
- Release: NA: December 1992; EU: September 1993
- Genre: Racing/Vehicular combat
- Modes: Single-player, multiplayer

R.C. Pro-Am II is a racing video game developed by Rare and released by Tradewest for the Nintendo Entertainment System in December 1992. The game is the sequel to the 1988 R.C. Pro-Am and features similar gameplay with a wider variety of tracks, currency-based vehicle and weapon upgrades, and bonus stages. In R.C. Pro-Am II, four players, either human or artificial intelligence, race on a series of tracks to finish first while avoiding obstacles and hazards. The winner receives race points and money. The game features a multiplayer mode in which up to four human players can compete against each other simultaneously.

Reviewers praised the sequel's additional features and variety, while others found its gameplay unoriginal compared to the original and its contemporaries. Critics lauded the multiplayer mode, which some said was a reason alone to buy the game. The game was released in Rare's 2015 Rare Replay compilation for Xbox One, and on the Nintendo Classics service on September 1, 2026.

== Gameplay ==
R.C. Pro-Am II screenshot

R.C. Pro-Am II is a racing video game in which four vehicles compete on a series of 24 different tracks: eight standard racetracks, eight "cityscape" tracks, and eight offroad tracks. The difficulty level increases between each type of course. Players must navigate around course obstacles to finish the race. In the single-player mode, the players races against three artificial intelligence opponents. The game also has a multiplayer mode in which up to four human players can race against each other. The objective of each race is to finish in the top three places to receive race points and money, which is used to upgrade vehicles and buy weapons. The top three finishers are qualified to participate in the next race while other players must use a continue. The game ends when the players run out of continues.

Players steer with the directional pad, accelerate with one button, and fire their weapon with the other. Before each race, players can use money earned from previous races to buy vehicle performance upgrades and weapons, which can be used on other competitors. Upgrades and weapons include the following: motors (increased speed); tires (better turning); missiles, bombs, and "freeze beams"; and buckshots (steal opponents' cash). Other purchasable goods include additional ammunition. Players can save money to purchase better, more expensive upgrades later in the game. Players can also collect letters that spell "PRO AM II" that are scattered on the track. Upon finishing the collection, the player receives a new, faster vehicle with tighter controls. Track terrain varies, including winter environments, crossroads, and rivers. Track hazards like water, bombs, mud, ice, ridges, oil, and bomb-dropping aircraft slow player speed. The game includes two types of bonus stages (tug of war and drag race) that award race points and cash.

== Background and release ==
Ultimate Play the Game was founded by brothers Tim and Chris Stamper, along with Tim's wife, Carol, from their headquarters in Ashby-de-la-Zouch in 1982. They began producing video games for the ZX Spectrum throughout the early 1980s. The company were known for their reluctance to reveal details about their operations and then-upcoming projects. Little was known about their development process except that they used to work in "separate teams": one team would work on development whilst the other would concentrate on other aspects such as sound or graphics. This company later evolved into Rare, the developer of R.C. Pro-Am II. It was published by Tradewest for the Nintendo Entertainment System in December 1992 in North America, and in September 1993 in Europe.

== Reception ==
Nintendo Power praised the game's controls and upgrade options, which made the game strategic. The magazine criticized the difficulty as unfair, with aircraft hazards that gave players no reaction time in which to dodge attacks. Nintendo Magazine System praised the game overall and its multiplayer in particular, but felt that better games were available. In 1993, GamePro said that the game was better than its predecessor, but noted that the graphics and sound could have been better. Jeuxvideo.com appreciated how the sequel's cars had better traction, but thought the game was technically unrefined considering its few advances in four years' time. For example, they criticized Rare for recycling the original game's audio. In 1994, Game Players had high praise for the game's multiplayer, screeching sound effects, vehicle handling, and replay value. They criticized its lack of in-game music and current weapon indicators, and struggled to anticipate turns in the track in the game's angled perspective.

Retrogaming magazine Retro Gamer said that R.C. Pro-Am II was not substantially different from its predecessor. They found the racing game mechanics similar apart from the upgrade features. The reviewer added that players expected more, especially for a title that was released five years after the original. He also noted that while the single-player mode was "passable", the multiplayer mode was what made the game stand out on its own, providing "excellent gaming despite its lack of originality".

R.C. Pro-Am II was named Nintendo Power's best NES game of 1993 over Battletoads & Double Dragon and Kirby's Adventure. The magazine credited the game's excellent controls and course variety. R.C. Pro-Am II is included in Rare Replay, a compilation of 30 Rare titles, released on the Xbox One on August 4, 2015. The game was re-released for the Nintendo Switch via the Nintendo Classics service on 1 September 2026.
