= Yooka-Laylee =

2017 video game

- Developer: Playtonic Games (Note: PlayStation 4 and Xbox One versions developed by Team17)
- Publisher: Team17 (Note: Yooka-Replaylee was co-published by Playtonic Friends and PM Studios.)
- Director: Chris Sutherland
- Producer: Andy Wilson
- Designers: Gavin Price; Gary Richards
- Artists: Steve Mayles; Steven Hurst; Kevin Bayliss
- Writer: Andy Robinson
- Composers: Grant Kirkhope; David Wise; Steve Burke
- Engine: Unity
- Platforms: Linux, macOS, PlayStation 4, Windows, Xbox One, Nintendo Switch, Amazon Luna; Replaylee; Nintendo Switch 2, PlayStation 5, Windows, Xbox Series X/S
- Release: Linux, macOS, PlayStation 4, Windows, Xbox One; 11 April 2017; Nintendo Switch; 14 December 2017; Amazon Luna; 20 October 2020; Replaylee; 9 October 2025
- Genres: Platform, action-adventure
- Modes: Single-player, multiplayer

Yooka-Laylee is a 2017 platform game developed by British developer Playtonic Games and published by Team17. Developed by a group of former key personnel from Rare, Yooka-Laylee is a spiritual successor to the Banjo-Kazooie series. The game follows chameleon Yooka and bat Laylee on their quest to retrieve a magical book from an evil corporation.

After years of planning to develop a new game, Playtonic Games initiated a Kickstarter campaign that attracted significant media coverage and raised a record-breaking sum of over £2 million. It was released for Linux, macOS, PlayStation 4, Windows and Xbox One in April 2017, Nintendo Switch in December 2017 and Amazon Luna in October 2020.

Yooka-Laylee received mixed reviews, with critics divided on whether emulating its predecessors was enough to make it a successful game, or whether it was purely trying to capitalize on nostalgia. While most critics agreed that it captured the essence of earlier platformers, they also pointed out technical shortcomings and outdated gameplay.

A spin-off, Yooka-Laylee and the Impossible Lair, was released on 8 October 2019. A remake, Yooka-Replaylee, was released on 9 October 2025.

== Gameplay ==
Yooka-Laylee features gameplay similar to the spiritual predecessor, Banjo-Kazooie, where the player searches for and collects items in an open 3D environment.

Yooka-Laylee is a platform game played from a third-person perspective. The gameplay is similar to that of games in the Banjo-Kazooie and Chameleon Twist series. The player controls two characters that work together to explore their environment, collect items, solve puzzles and defeat enemies. The playable characters are Yooka, a male chameleon, and Laylee, a female bat. Yooka and Laylee explore worlds contained within magical books and complete challenges to collect "Pagies": golden book pages that act as currency. Players can use their Pagies to either unlock worlds or expand those which have already been unlocked. The characters share one health meter, but unlike the game's spiritual predecessor, they have unlimited lives; should they die from losing all health or falling into a bottomless pit, they will respawn at a checkpoint.

Yooka and Laylee can learn a variety of abilities, including "sonar blasting", "tongue whipping", "sky soaring", eating berries for temporary powers such as fire breath, and a "fart bubble" for breathing underwater. Most of these abilities use a power meter that is filled by collecting butterflies (which can be eaten instead to restore health). Each ability is earned by collecting enough quills to purchase them from the snake Trowzer. Collectibles by the name of Mollycools are given to Dr. Puzz, an octopus scientist, in order to give Yooka and Laylee various transformations that grant them abilities. Play Tonics are role-playing-like ability modifiers that are purchased from Vendi, a living vending machine, and equipped to modify or enhance players' ability stats. Also found in the levels are Ghost Writers, collectible characters who provide various challenges like catching or fighting them, and Play Tokens, which are used to play the secret arcade games that are found once per level, hosted by a low-polygon tyrannosaurus rex named Rextro Sixtyfourus. There are several "quiz show challenges", similar to the Banjo-Kazooie games. Kartos, a sentient mine cart, allows "mine cart" sequences, similar to those of Donkey Kong Country and Donkey Kong 64.

The game features a local cooperative multiplayer mode for two players. There is also a 2–4 player adversarial local multiplayer mode, with eight different minigames.

== Plot ==
At the Hivory Towers corporation, CEO Capital B and his assistant Dr. Quack use a machine to suck up all the books in the world with the intention of obtaining a magical book called the "One Book" in order to rewrite the universe. Meanwhile, on Shipwreck Creek, Yooka and Laylee, who have the One Book, watch as the book gets sucked into Hivory Towers with its pages escaping. The two venture to Hivory Towers to reclaim the book.

Traversing through Hivory Towers, Yooka and Laylee explore five different worlds to collect the One Book's Pagies. After collecting 100 Pagies, Yooka and Laylee eventually confront and defeat Capital B in his office, where they learn that Hivory Towers is merely part of a bigger association named V.I.L.E. and that Dr. Quack is really Capital B.'s supervisor. Just then, a sentient cannon named Blasto, who is a friend of Yooka and Laylee's, inadvertently shoots a cannon ball at Capital B. and Dr. Quack, knocking them onto the One Book and they subsequently get trapped inside it. Afterwards, Yooka, Laylee, and all their friends celebrate their victory with a party.

== Development ==
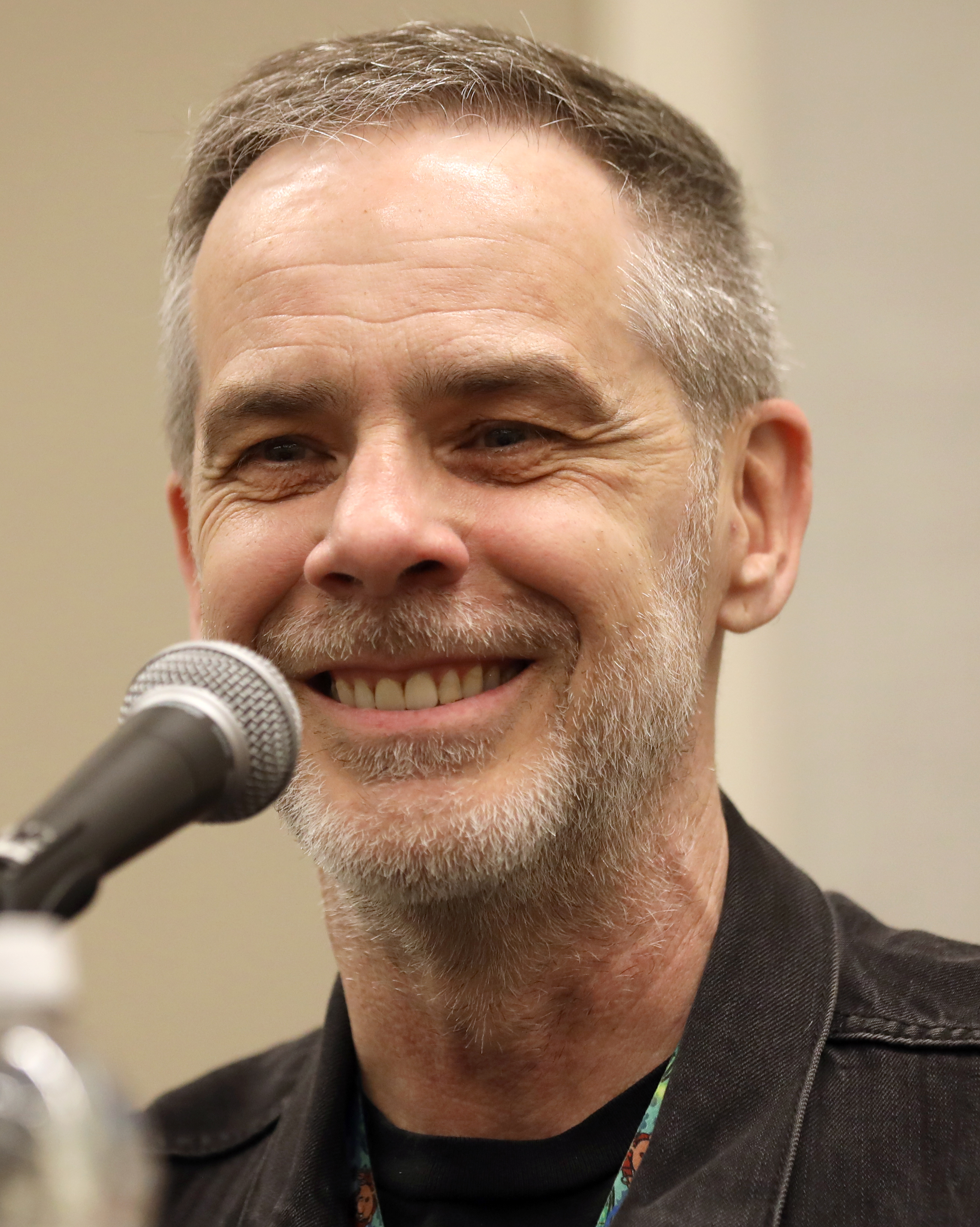
Former Rare composer Grant Kirkhope wrote a number of musical themes for the game.

In September 2012, a group of former Rare employees attempted to create a spiritual successor to Banjo-Kazooie. They joined under the Twitter handle Mingy Jongo, the name of a boss from the second Banjo game, Banjo-Tooie, with cooperation from ex-Rare designers, including composer Grant Kirkhope. In December 2014, the account was left abandoned, and the project confirmed to be on indefinite hiatus by Kirkhope in a Reddit AMA; however, in August a video game company named Playtonic Games was incorporated by this group, and the account was revived under the name of its new company. Playtonic announced that they were planning a spiritual successor to the Banjo-Kazooie franchise titled Yooka-Laylee, formerly codenamed Project Ukulele. At the start of development, six people were involved. To finance the game, the development team decided to use fundraising website Kickstarter to acquire £175,000 to start production. The campaign attracted attention and the goal was reached within 40 minutes, a record on the platform. Later the campaign made another record for the fastest game to get US$1,000,000 pledged in the history of the platform. Within a few weeks, the game had garnered £2.1 million from over 80,000 backers.

The game was intended as a resurrection and modernization of the "collectathon" 3D platforming game genre of the late 1990s and early 2000s, with an emphasis on progression by collecting various different items. Some of the collectibles were created using 2D sprites. Additional post-launch downloadable content was planned, which began production following the game's release, with crowdfunding participants receiving this content for free. The game's native language is featured in English; it features French, German, Italian and Spanish localizations. Wil Overton, a former artist for Rare, illustrated the game's instruction manual.

The game was created with the Unity engine with help from additional middleware tools. The team stated that this made it easier for them to fix bugs and boosted their overall productivity. The phoneticizing of "ukulele" was an early idea that went through several versions (e.g. Hawaiian terms Yoku, meaning "to eat bugs", and Laylee, meaning "to fly") until the final title "Yooka-Laylee".

Yooka-Laylee features 3D worlds by environment artist Steven Hurst, who also worked on the Banjo-Kazooie series as well as Viva Piñata. The game's characters were designed by Kevin Bayliss, who helped design the modern Kong characters in the Donkey Kong Country series, and Ed Bryan, who designed the characters in Banjo-Kazooie. Originally, character art director Steve Mayles imagined Yooka as a lion, but eventually made him a chameleon and created Laylee as a bat, because of how their abilities could accommodate the gameplay. Player characters were deliberately left without voices so as to enhance player choice. The game's perk system was based upon what was done in video games outside the 3D platform genre. Layered animations were among other things employed to improve character movement. Along with Kirkhope, former Rare composers David Wise and Steve Burke collaborated to compose the game's orchestral score. A soundtrack CD was released and rewarded to certain supporters of the crowdfunding campaign. The increase in memory availability since working on Banjo-Kazooie permitted a higher quality soundtrack. The title character of the indie game Shovel Knight makes an appearance as a non-playable character, voiced by Shovel Knight director Sean Velasco. The inclusion was announced by Shovel Knight developer Yacht Club Games following the release of Yooka's character trailer in September 2016.

In March 2017, YouTube personality Jon "JonTron" Jafari, who was set to voice a character in Yooka-Laylee, had his voiceovers removed from the final game after making racist comments on a Twitch livestream. Jafari stated that although it was unfortunate his role had been removed, he understood Playtonic's reasoning and wished them success.

Shortly after Yooka-Laylee's release, Playtonic announced further updates to the game to address criticism of the in-game camera and controls while adding additional features and various other improvements.

== Release ==
The game is published by Team17, who also assisted Playtonic with localization, product certification, quality assurance, marketing and general non-developer tasks. The game's funding project was announced on Kickstarter in May 2015. It reached its initial crowdfunding campaign goal of £175,000 within thirty-eight minutes and its initial highest goal of £1 million in 21 hours, at the time becoming the fastest video game in Kickstarter history to reach US$1 million. Playtonic Games later sent out a public statement thanking all their supporters and promising more updates in the future. The campaign added four additional stretch goals, all of which have been reached. Those who contributed predetermined amounts to the campaign received special rewards related to the game's release. It is currently the highest-funded UK video game in Kickstarter history, passing the previous record held by Elite: Dangerous, earning £2,090,104. with success in the crowdfunding campaign allowing a simultaneous April 2017 release for consoles.

In October 2016, Playtonic Games confirmed that the game would have a physical retail release alongside the digital release, and promised backers who earned the digital version the choice of physical media. In December, Playtonic Games confirmed the game would be available both digitally and at retail worldwide on 11 April 2017 for all platforms. In the same update, Playtonic Games announced that the Wii U version had been cancelled, with development duties moved to the Nintendo Switch. The announcement cited "unforeseen technical issues" as the reason for cancelling it. Playtonic offered Kickstarter backers who pledged for the Wii U version choices of refund or moving their pledge to any other platform at no additional cost. Playtonic said that additional details regarding the game's Nintendo Switch version would be announced in January 2017. It was later explained that the decision to cancel the Wii U version is unrelated to the console's poor commercial performance, and that some of the developers expressed reluctance to do so. In February, Playtonic noted that a physical release for Yooka-Laylee on the Nintendo Switch was "beyond [their] scope", and they had no plans for it at the time. Limited Run Games announced to release physical copies for the Nintendo Switch in North America, starting in August 2018. Playtonic Games also announced the release of a special Collector's Edition of the game for December 2017, including a statue, concept art, a key chain, and pins.

Yooka-Laylee was delayed to early 2017 in order to give the team additional time to polish the game. Additionally, Playtonic Games was focusing their development efforts on the PC and Wii U versions, and originally giving the latter platform "the right attention" due to greater demand from Kickstarter backers, as well as nostalgia factors. Publisher Team17 developed the PlayStation 4 and Xbox One versions of the game. On 1 April 2017, Playtonic released The Yooka-Laylee Rap!, which was a stretch goal on Kickstarter. It pays homage to the DK Rap from Donkey Kong 64, with Kirkhope reprising his role as the composer.

== Reception ==
Reception

Aggregate scores
Aggregator	Score
Metacritic	(NS) 75/100 (PC) 73/100 (PS4) 68/100 (XONE) 73/100
OpenCritic	57% recommend

Review scores
Publication	Score
Destructoid	8/10
Electronic Gaming Monthly	7/10
Game Informer	8/10
GameRevolution	4/5
GameSpot	6/10
GamesRadar+	3/5
IGN	7/10
Nintendo Life	8/10
PC Gamer (US)	68/100
Polygon	5.5/10
VideoGamer.com	4/10
The Escapist	4.5/5

Yooka-Laylee received "mixed or average" reviews on the PC, PlayStation 4 and Xbox One, while on the Nintendo Switch it received "generally favourable" reviews, according to review aggregator Metacritic. Fellow review aggregator OpenCritic assessed that the game received fair approval, being recommended by 57% of critics. Critics generally agreed that the game recaptured the feel of a classic 3D platformer, but were divided over whether this made the game successful or simply made its gameplay and design feel unoriginal and outdated. Its Kickstarter backers were ultimately satisfied with the final product, despite their disappointments with the pre-release demo being delayed and the cancellation of the Wii U version, with many of those backers being given Steam codes instead of Switch codes. It debuted at number 6 in the U.K. all-formats chart in its first week as well as the number 2 spot in the Australian sales charts in its first week. By 24 November 2018, the game has sold over 1 million copies.

The game won the award for "Game in a Small Studio" at The Independent Game Developers' Association Awards, whereas its other nomination was for "Action and Adventure Game". It was also nominated for "New Games IP", "Animation", and "Visual Design" at the 2017 Develop Awards; and for "Game, Original Family" at the National Academy of Video Game Trade Reviewers Awards.

Many critics praised the game as a successful follow up to the original Banjo-Kazooie games. Steven Bogos of The Escapist positively referred to the game as "Banjo-Threeie", calling it "a nostalgic ride through time, bringing the collect-a-thons from the N64 era into the modern age". James Kozanitis of GameRevolution felt that Yooka-Laylee improved on the gameplay and structure of classic titles, in particular the relevance and importance of the collectables. Chris Carter of Destructoid praised the expansive levels and the colorful design, but concluded that due to the throwback designs, it would not be for everyone. Marty Sliva of IGN called Yooka-Laylee "a good reminder that this genre, once thought to be dead, still has some life left in it". He also noted different aspects of the game that felt authentic to games from the 90s, praising the level design, soundtrack and characters while also criticizing how the game controlled at certain points and stated it was "not 1998 anymore" regarding frustrating camera movement. Kallie Plagge of GameSpot similarly praised certain aspects such as the collectibles and non-linear structure, while also criticizing the uncooperative camera and in some instances convoluted level design.

On the other hand, Colm Ahern was more negative about the game's intention to capitalize on people's nostalgia, especially noting "camera issues, ambiguous puzzles, a distinct lack of signposting, and voices that will make your ears bleed", while the game itself could not decide whether it was aiming at children or adults as an audience. Furthermore, while he was positive about the first level, he claimed that all other levels in the game were falling short, finding them repetitive and confusing. Chelsea Stark of Polygon noted that Yooka-Laylee was "proof that sometimes our fondest memories should stay in the past". She called the game's combat mechanics "a chore" and was critical of the controls. GamesRadar also noted the game's repetitive missions and objectives, with reviewer David Houghton noting that some of the game's power-ups, especially the flight ability, render most puzzles and level design choices obsolete.

Yooka-Replaylee reviews

Aggregate score
Aggregator	Score
Metacritic	(PC) 75/100 (PS5) 73/100 (XSXS) 82/100 (NS2) 77/100

Review scores
Publication	Score
IGN	5/10
Nintendo Life	8/10
Nintendo World Report	7.5/10
Push Square	8/10
Retro Gamer	83%

Reviewing Yooka-Replaylee, Darran Jones of Retro Gamer called it a huge improvement over the original, citing visual and audible enhancements as well as gameplay such as the pair of characters' abilities being available from the game's start, and a redesigned navigation map and 3D camera.

== Remake, spin-offs and other appearances ==
A remake of the game entitled Yooka-Replaylee was announced in June 2024. In addition to updated graphics and character models, the remake features tweaked controls, rebalanced challenges and puzzles, and quality-of-life additions such as a map to track objectives and a fast travel system. Unlike the original version, all of the characters' moves are unlocked from the beginning of the game, and the world expansion mechanic has been removed, with the worlds already being fully expanded when the players first enter them. Additional collectible types have been implemented, including a new currency which allows players to unlock additional tonics. Yooka-Replaylee was released on 9 October 2025 for the Nintendo Switch 2, PlayStation 5, Windows and Xbox Series X/S.

Playtonic has also developed spin-offs based on the game. Yooka-Laylee and the Impossible Lair was released for PlayStation 4, Xbox One, Nintendo Switch, and PC on 8 October 2019. In contrast to the original, Impossible Lair features 2.5D levels resembling those of the Donkey Kong Country series, although it does contain a 3D overworld. A kart racing game, Super Yooka-Laylee Kart, is currently in development.

Yooka and Laylee appear as playable guest characters in the fighting games Mighty Fight Federation, Brawlout, and in the party battle game Brief Battles as a skin for the character Violet, and as assist characters in the beat 'em up game Jitsu Squad. Developers Komi Games and Playtonic Games worked together to write a canonical story for characters Yooka and Laylee in Mighty Fight Federation that takes place between Yooka-Laylee and Yooka-Laylee and the Impossible Lair. Yooka and Laylee each appear as paid costumes in Fall Guys.
