= R.C. Pro-Am =

1988 video game

- North American NES cover art
- Developer: Rare
- Publishers: Nintendo (NES); Tradewest (Genesis)
- Designers: Tim Stamper; Chris Stamper
- Programmers: Paul Proctor (NES); Steve Patrick (Genesis)
- Composer: David Wise
- Platforms: Nintendo Entertainment System, arcade, Sega Genesis
- Release: NES: NA: February 1988; EU: 15 April 1988; BRA: 1994; Genesis: NA: 1992
- Genres: Racing, vehicular combat
- Mode: Single-player
- Arcade system: PlayChoice-10

R.C. Pro-Am is a racing game developed by Rare and published by Nintendo for the Nintendo Entertainment System. It was released in North America in February 1988, and then in Europe on 15 April. Presented in an overhead isometric perspective, a single player races a radio-controlled car around a series of tracks in vehicular combat. Each track qualifies its top three racers for the next track. Collectible power-up items improve performance, hazards include rain puddles and oil slicks, and missiles and bombs can temporarily disable opponents. Originally titled Pro Am Racing, it was ported to the Sega Genesis in 1992 as Championship Pro-Am, an enhanced remake with enhanced graphics and additional features. R.C. Pro-Am spawned two sequels: Super R.C. Pro-Am in 1991, and R.C. Pro-Am II in 1992.

As one of Rare's first successful NES games, R.C. Pro-Am was well-received for its visuals, sound, gameplay, and enjoyability. Its overhead perspective distinguishes it from earlier first-person racing games. It inspired subsequent games such as Super Off Road, Rock n' Roll Racing, and the Mario Kart series. It has appeared in many "top games of all time" lists and is regarded as one of the best of the NES library. It was re-released in Rare's 2015 Rare Replay compilation for the Xbox One, and on the Nintendo Classics service on February 21, 2024.

== Gameplay ==
R.C. Pro-Am is a racing video game in which a player races a radio-controlled car against three opponents around a track from an overhead isometric perspective. The horizontal control pad buttons steer left or right, and the other buttons accelerate, fire weapons, and pause the game. Across 32 tracks, the top three of four racers qualify for each next race or reach a game over. Two continues can restart the previous race, losing all points. Each track gives a trophy, and a high score yields larger "High Score Trophies", leading up to the "Super Trophy".

Twelve unique track configurations are repeated indefinitely. The original box art claims that the game contains "32 tracks of racing thrills" but the 24th track is unofficially the last because it is the largest. Each track after 24 is a repeat from track 1, but with additional features. At track 32, all computer-controlled opponents run at maximum speed and cannot be beaten without weapons. The game has no formal end; players eventually run out of weapons and are eliminated from the race.

The player, represented by the red truck in the center, leads the race while about to collect a "bonus letter" and a roll cage.

Track items are collectable by driving over them. "Tune-up items" include turbo acceleration, "hotter engines" for higher top speed, and "super sticky tires" for traction and cornering; these additional abilities are displayed on the "track conditions" screen between races. Collectable weapons can temporarily disable other vehicles; missiles stop opponents from the front, and bombs from the rear. Collectable ammunition appears as a star, and carries over to the next race. Collectable roll cages protect cars from crash damage, stationary zippers give cars an extra speed boost, and bonus letters give large point bonuses and an upgraded car when all letters spelling "NINTENDO" ("CHAMPION" in the Genesis and Rare Replay versions) are collected. The standard truck upgrades to a faster 4-Wheeler and then to the fastest Off Roader. Hazards include oil slicks which spin cars out of control, water puddles and rain squalls slow them down, pop-up barriers crash cars, and skulls decrease ammunition. Excessive use of projectile weaponry makes the yellow car accelerate to 127 mph, which cannot be matched by the player.

The Sega Genesis version, Championship Pro-Am, features some gameplay differences from the NES version. Players race against five other vehicles instead of three, but must still place in the top three to move to the next track. Race records are saved, and players are prompted to enter a name before the game starts.

== Background and release ==
The game development company Ultimate Play the Game was founded by brothers Tim and Chris Stamper, along with Tim's wife, Carol, from their headquarters in Ashby-de-la-Zouch in 1982. They began producing video games for the ZX Spectrum throughout the early 1980s. The company was known for secrecy about operations and upcoming projects. Little was known except that they worked in "separate teams": one team worked on programming and the other concentrated on other aspects such as sound or graphics. This company later evolved into Rare, which in 1987 developed Pro-Am Racing and renamed it to R.C. Pro-Am.

It was released for the Nintendo Entertainment System (NES) by Nintendo in February 1988 in North America, and in Europe on 15 April. It was converted to the Sega Genesis as Championship Pro-Am, released by Tradewest in 1992. Its music was composed by David Wise, known for his work on Cobra Triangle and the Donkey Kong Country series.

R.C. Pro-Am received preview coverage in the Fall 1987 issue of Nintendo Fun Club News – the company's predecessor to Nintendo Power. A more in-depth review in the proceeding Winter 1987 issue said that "this game is a must for RC Car (radio-controlled) owners". It is the cover feature of the February–March 1988 issue, with a full walkthrough. In Nintendo Power's premiere issue in July 1988, R.C. Pro-Am is listed 6th on its "Top 30" NES games list, and as the top "Dealer's Pick". It went down to the 8th position in September 1988, and 12th in November.

== Reception and legacy ==
Reception

Review scores
Publication	Score
AllGame	4.5/5
Computer and Video Games	90%

Worldwide, 2.3 million copies of R.C. Pro-Am were sold. This unqualified success made Rare into a major developer for the Nintendo Entertainment System.

Computer Gaming World called it "a compelling, innovating approach to car racing video games". Bill Kunkel found that it was distinguished from earlier racing games such as Sega's Enduro Racer, Nintendo's Mach Rider, and Atari's Pole Position by going from a more standard "pseudo-first-person" view to an isometric perspective. He praised its simplicity and controls, comparing them to that of an actual radio-controlled car. He criticized its lack of a two-player feature and for the instruction booklet's vagueness. He concluded by lauding its graphics and sound, saying that they "help make this the best game of its kind ever produced in any electronic game format". Bloomberg Businessweek listed R.C. Pro-Am, along with Cobra Triangle, as Rare's most notable NES games.

The game has continued to receive positive reviews. Allgame's Chris Couper stated that R.C. Pro-Am is among the best NES games, due to its realistic nature. He praised its challenge and sound. Retro Gamer saw the game as a precursor to Micro Machines by Codemasters, and compared the action and variety of items to the later Mario Kart series. They hailed it as one of Rare's best early products, stating: "Radio-controlled car racing in videogame form was pretty much perfected here". The 2009 book Vintage Games compared it to Spy Hunter, noting its emphasis on collecting power-ups and weapons and not just on racing, saying that the trend of combining racing with vehicular combat would reappear in future games such as Super Mario Kart and Rock n' Roll Racing. Later in 2010, as part of Rare's 25th anniversary, the magazine said that it was Rare's first successful NES game and one of the first games to combine racing and vehicular combat. Readers ranked it 22nd in a list of top 25 Rare games. In 2016, VintageGamer.com praised it for still being enjoyable and challenging 28 years after its release.

R.C. Pro-Am has appeared many times on various "best games" lists. A survey by GamePro in 1990 ranked it the 10th-best sports video game. Electronic Gaming Monthly placed it the 52nd best console video game of all time in 1997. Game Informer placed it number 84 on its "Top 100 Games of All Time" list in August 2001. Paste magazine placed it as the 8th greatest NES game ever, saying that it is "way more fun than real remote-control cars, which never seemed to be equipped with missile capabilities". IGN placed it the 13th-best NES game of all time, citing its player popularity and good sales. Executive Editor Craig Harris said that it was one of the first games to introduce the concept of vehicular combat, inspiring other games such as Super R.C. Pro-Am, R.C. Pro-Am II, and the Mario Kart series. 1UP.com listed it as the 14th best NES game, citing its good graphics and gameplay elements, though the difficulty level was too high. As with other retrospectives, the website staff listed the game as inspiration for future series such as Super Off Road and Rock n' Roll Racing. In a retrospective at Rare's 25th anniversary, GamePro listed R.C. Pro-Am as one of Rare's best games, calling the release "one of Rare's finest moments". Rare began work on a follow-up game for the Nintendo 64, called Pro-Am 64, which changed direction and became Diddy Kong Racing. The NES version of R.C. Pro-Am is one of the 30 games in the Xbox One compilation Rare Replay. The game was re-released for the Nintendo Switch via the Nintendo Classics service on 21 February 2024.

== See also ==
- Eliminator Boat Duel
