= Cobra Triangle =

1989 NES game

- North American box art
- Developer: Rare
- Publisher: Nintendo
- Designers: Mark Betteridge, Tim Stamper, Chris Stamper
- Programmer: Mark Betteridge
- Artists: Tim Stamper, Kevin Bayliss
- Composer: David Wise
- Platform: Nintendo Entertainment System
- Release: July 1989
- Genres: Racing, vehicular combat
- Mode: Single-player

Cobra Triangle is a 1989 racing video game developed by Rare and published by Nintendo for the Nintendo Entertainment System. The player controls a weapon-equipped speedboat through 25 levels. Objectives include winning races, saving swimmers, and defusing bombs. The game also includes vehicular combat, power-ups and is displayed from a 3D isometric perspective with automatic scrolling that follows the player's movement. The Stamper brothers designed the game and David Wise wrote its soundtrack. Computer and Video Games highly recommended the game and praised its graphics and gameplay. Later reviewers lauded its level diversity and noted its graphical similarities to previous Rare game R.C. Pro-Am. IGN and GamesRadar ranked Cobra Triangle among their top NES games. The latter considered Cobra Triangle emblematic of the NES era's aesthetic. It is included in Rare's 2015 Rare Replay compilation for Xbox One, and was re-released on the Nintendo Classics service on July 4, 2024.

== Gameplay ==
Screenshot of gameplay

Cobra Triangle is a racing, vehicular combat video game. The player races a cannon-equipped speedboat against other watercraft. The 25 stages of graduated difficulty vary in objectives: winning races, saving swimmers, and defusing bombs. Some levels end in boss fights. In races, the speedboat must avoid the riverbank and mid-river obstacles while outpacing a timer. The boat can attack other competitors, fly airborne via ramps, and pick up power-ups that upgrade its weapons and speed. In upstream races, the player navigates the speedboat to avoid logs and whirlpools. In bomb defusing activities, the player moves four protected bombs to a detonation site. In another mode, the player must destroy rogue boats before they drag swimmers to the edge of the lake. Any swimmers dragged halfway must be manually returned to the lake's center. The player loses a life if unsuccessful. Cobra Triangle is displayed from a 3D isometric perspective and its screen automatically scrolls as the speedboat moves.

== Background and release ==
Ultimate Play the Game was founded by brothers Tim and Chris Stamper, along with Tim's wife, Carol, from their headquarters in Ashby-de-la-Zouch in 1982. They began producing video games for the ZX Spectrum throughout the early 1980s. The company were known for their reluctance to reveal details about their operations and then-upcoming projects. Little was known about their development process except that they used to work in "separate teams": one team would work on development whilst the other would concentrate on other aspects such as sound or graphics. This company later evolved into Rare, the developer of Cobra Triangle.

Mark Betteridge and Tim and Chris Stamper designed the game and David Wise wrote its soundtrack. Nintendo released Cobra Triangle in July 1989. It was later included in the August 2015 Xbox One compilation of 30 Rare titles, Rare Replay.

== Reception ==
Reception

Review scores
| Publication | Score |
|---|---|
| AllGame | 3.5/5 |
| Computer and Video Games | 93% |
| The Games Machine | 80% |

In contemporaneous reviews, Jaz Rignall (Computer and Video Games) wrote in high praise of the "convincing" graphics, smooth gameplay, and "addictive" replay value. The magazine selected the game as a recommendation. Mark Caswell (The Games Machine) was most frustrated by the waterfall jumping sequences. In a retrospective review, Skyler Miller (AllGame) appreciated the diversity of levels. Reviewers noted its graphical similarity to R.C. Pro-Am, particularly in its camera angle and gameplay. Brett Alan Weiss (AllGame) put Cobra Triangle in the lineage of the 1982 River Raid for the Atari 2600. In comparison, both games have vehicular boat combat while avoiding land. Cobra Triangle's camera view is isometric rather than overhead, and its gameplay is more focused on racing than combat. IGN and GamesRadar named Cobra Triangle among the top NES games. The latter had "the most admiration" for Cobra Triangle out of all of Rare's catalog. They thought the game aged well and typified NES-era beauty in its isometric combat, upgrades, and game type variety.
