= Pinball Quest =

1989 video game

- North American cover art
- Developer: Tose
- Publisher: Jaleco
- Designer: Art 13, Katsuhiko Gen (credited as "Katsupro")
- Composer: Akihito Hayashi (credited as "Hayashi")
- Platform: Nintendo Entertainment System
- Release: JP: December 15, 1989; NA: June 1990; AU: 1992
- Genres: Pinball, roleplaying game
- Mode: Single-player or multiplayer

Pinball Quest is a 1989 pinball video game developed by Tose (Note: Tose is known for performing uncredited contract work and many of its credits are difficult to confirm. While Pinball Quest is widely believed to have been developed by Tose, this information may be speculative.) and published by Jaleco. Released for the Nintendo Entertainment System, Pinball Quest was unusual at the time of its release for its "unique" mash-up of pinball and role-playing game (RPG) mechanics, and it is considered the "first ever RPG pinball game".

== Gameplay ==
Fighting a boss battle

The game includes four modes: a story-driven "RPG mode" as well as "Circus," "Viva! Golf," and "Pop! Pop!"

Circus (a slot machine-themed game) and Viva! Golf (a whack-a-mole-style game) are additional single-player modes. Pop! Pop! is an Americana-themed multiplayer mode that can be played by up to 4 players.

=== RPG mode ===
In RPG mode, the player controls the silver pinball and progresses through a six-level castle to rescue Princess Bali from Beezelbub, the "Dark Lord of the Machine". As in traditional pinball, flippers are used to keep the ball in the playfield and accomplish objectives, such as hitting targets or defeating an enemy.

During gameplay, the player earns gold which can be spent at the Black Market, a store run by imps. At the Black Market, players can purchase upgraded flippers and stoppers.

Below are the six "RPG mode" stages and the notable characters or features in each stage as listed in the instruction manual.

1. Tomb (the Captain's Spirit, skeletons)
2. Gate (Ziffroo the witch, demon dogs)
3. Goblins (goblin kids, goblin guards)
4. River ("toitles", "Wheel O' Luck", dark knights)
5. Harpy (harpy, demon guards)
6. Throne room (Beezelbub)

== Reception and legacy ==
Pinball Quest has received mixed reviews over time, and many reviewers focus on the novelty of its RPG elements. The game has been called a "curious mix of genres", with some reviewers describing it in more extreme terms, stating it is "among the most bizarre genre hybrids in the history of video games" and a "baffling experiment".

Contemporary reviews in 1990 credited the game for its clever concept and variety of game modes. A Hardcore Gamer retrospective in 2007 highlighted Pinball Quest as an underrated game of its era. Journalist Jeff Gerstmann stated in 2023 that, despite its interesting premise and his own positive memories of the game, Pinball Quest is a poor simulation of pinball and ultimately unenjoyable: "It just sucks."

Pinball Quest is an early example of pinball genre hybrids and many future pinball titles would be released combining a wide variety of themes and game mechanics, from Kirby's Pinball Land (1993) to Yoku's Island Express (2018). The 2014 game Rollers of the Realm was directly inspired by Pinball Quest.
