= High Speed (video game) =

1991 video game

- Developer: Rare
- Publisher: Tradewest
- Designers: Chris Stamper, Tim Stamper
- Programmers: Chris Stamper, Joe Stamper
- Artist: Tim Stamper
- Composer: David Wise
- Platform: Nintendo Entertainment System
- Release: NA: July 1991; PAL: 1991
- Genre: Simulation (pinball)
- Mode: Single-player

High Speed is a pinball simulation video game developed by Rare for the Nintendo Entertainment System, and published by Tradewest in 1991. High Speed employs the game engine that Rare previously developed for Pin*Bot (1990).

Rare adapted the game from the pinball machine High Speed, which was designed by Steve Ritchie and released by Williams Electronics in 1986.

In 1995, Williams Entertainment published a sequel, The Getaway, for the Game Boy, based on Ritchie's pinball machine The Getaway: High Speed II.

== Gameplay ==
Similar to Pin*Bot, the NES version of High Speed uses the ruleset of the original machine, but with a few new elements added in, such as collecting safes and helicopters that allow the player to play bonus levels. Patches of acid can appear on the playfield which can dissolve the ball, and patches of water can slow it down, and a tumbleweed attempts to drain the ball. Rust balls and bombs can destroy the flippers.

After collecting 3 helicopters the player is taken to another playfield with 4 racing cars and can use pinballs to try and slow down the other cars to win the race. Collecting 3 safes allows the player to play on a pachinko-style playfield.

The object of the main game (as in the pinball machine) is to activate the police chase mode by hitting the nine stoplight targets, changing the main stoplight on the ramp from green to yellow, and then to red. Once the light is red, the player can hit the ball up the ramp to start the police chase mode. Shooting the ball up the ramp again escapes the police and starts 3-ball multi-ball, and hitting one of the balls up the ramp again wins the hideout jackpot (beginning at 250,000 points and growing until it is collected).

When playing on the main table the bottom third of the screen always shows the flippers, with the rest of the playfield shown scrolling up and down depending on where the ball is at. This mechanic is protected by the same patent Rare used for Pin Bot.

== Reception ==
Reception

Review scores
Publication	Score
GamePro	4/5
VG&CE	8/10

VideoGames & Computer Entertainment found High Speed to be a better game than Nintendo's 1984 pinball simulation, Pinball. The reviewer lauded the game's smooth, responsive ball physics, but was frustrated by the game's obstacles, and the lack of an option to disable them.
