= Rock 'n Ball =

1989 video game

Rock'n' Ball
- North American cover art
- Developer: KID
- Publishers: JP: Namco; NA: NTVIC
- Designer: Norihisa Kawamoto
- Composer: Norio Nakagata
- Platform: Nintendo Entertainment System
- Release: JP: March 24, 1989; NA: January 1990
- Genre: Pinball
- Modes: Single-player, multiplayer

Rock'n' Ball, released in Japan as Family Pinball (ファミリーピンボール), is a 1989 pinball video game developed by KID and published by Namco for the Nintendo Entertainment System. The video game was released in both Japan and North America. In the North American version, fictional human characters are used instead of the licensed Namco characters, four male characters and two female characters are at the player's disposal.

Compared to the North American version, the bumpers in the Japanese version are separately further and the players have more room to guide their ball around the playing surface. The Japanese version has a higher overall difficulty compared to the North American version despite the latter having bigger arches.

== Gameplay ==
A hidden Pac-Man theme room in the "regular pinball mode", found only in the Japanese version.

There are several gameplay options in the game. Some are; "regular pinball" for up to four players which resembles a game of Pac-Man (rock and roll in the North American version), "nineball" where balls are knocked into a Bingo pattern, "battle pinball" (which operates more like Pong instead of pinball), and "sports pinball" where the pinball game becomes more similar to a soccer or hockey field.

There are three different variations to the "battle pinball" mode; "thunder," "bomber," and the basic "attack" mode. All three of these options uses specialized flippers and a specialized pinball. For example, the "bomber" mode has a pinball that explodes after a certain time limit has been reached and the player's two target switches have been turned into bombs. A switch on the right-hand side of the board activates the special effects in the "attack" mode.

Special guest characters in the Japanese version of the game include the Pac-Man character from the video game of the same name, Valkyrie from the video game Valkyrie no Bōken: Toki no Kagi Densetsu, Wonder Momo and Kai from the Babylonian Castle Saga series.

== Reception ==
Allgame gave Rock'n' Ball a rating of 3.5 stars out of a possible 5.
