= List of Touch! Generations titles =

The North and South American logo of the Touch! Generations series used for the Nintendo DS

Touch! Generations (Note: Japanese: タッチ!・ジェネレーションズ) is a brand created by Nintendo to denote video games on the Nintendo DS and Wii that are intended to appeal to a broader audience (mainly adults and the elderly) than the traditional gamer. Nintendo initially conceived the brand alongside the DS in Japan as a response to the country's faster population aging rate compared to Western regions, seeking to attract audiences outside its traditional target market of young hardcore gamers to supplement its player base. Titles under the brand were first introduced in Japan from April to June 2005, with the initial lineup consisting of titles such as Electroplankton, Nintendogs, Brain Age, Rakubiki Jiten DS, and Big Brain Academy.

The Touch! Generations logo for Europe and Australia is identical to the Japanese logo, except it is colored red rather than pink.

Big Brain Academy and Magnetica were the first games in North America to release under the Touch! Generations brand, with both releasing on 5 June 2006; they were followed up by Sudoku Gridmaster on 26 June. In addition, several previously released games were retroactively designated with the brand. Meanwhile, the brand was introduced in Europe on 9 June with the release of Brain Age, which was renamed Dr. Kawashima's Brain Training: How Old Is Your Brain?. The games designated with the Touch! Generations label varied between regions.

Titles under the Touch! Generations brand have generally been commercially successful, with those under specific series receiving particular attention; as of 31 March 2023, titles under the Nintendogs and Brain Age series for the Nintendo DS have sold for a combined total of 57.85 million units, while the Wii has titles in its eponymous series represent six of its top ten best-selling games with a combined total of 197.21 million units. The brand's popularity was most notable in Japan, where it was credited with invoking a significant push among developers in the country to create non-traditional titles for the Nintendo DS, with 220 such titles developed out of 810 total by May 2008. Furthermore, a soundtrack album with music from games within and outside the brand was made available in Japan on audio CD starting on 4 September 2008, as a Club Nintendo reward for 400 points.

Nintendo retired the brand with the launch of the Nintendo 3DS in 2011, six years after its introduction. Despite this, some games that were introduced under the brand continue to receive follow-up entries on the contemporary and future Nintendo consoles.

== Games for Nintendo DS ==
The video games published under the Touch! Generations brand for the Nintendo DS vary between countries. Organized alphabetically by title:

| Title | Original release date | | |
| Title | Japan | North America | PAL region |
|---|---|---|---|
| 100 Classic Book Collection | 7 October 2007 | 15 June 2010 | ^{EU} 26 December 2008^{AU} 22 January 2009 |
Notes: Known as 100 Classic Books in North America and DS Literature Collection (Note: Japanese: DS文学全集, Hepburn: DS Bungaku Zenshū) in Japan; PAL and North American versions include one hundred public domain works of literature, while Japanese version includes books from Chukei Publishing Company; Developed by Genius Sonority
| 1000 Cooking Recipes from Elle à Table | — | — | ^{EU} 2 July 2010 |
Notes: Cooking guide endorsed by the French cooking magazine Elle à Table; DSi enhanced; Developed by Agenda
| Active Health with Carol Vorderman | — | — | ^{EU} 7 August 2009 |
Notes: Fitness game endorsed by British media personality Carol Vorderman; Infrared support; Developed by Fuse Games
| America's Test Kitchen: Let's Get Cooking | — | 28 March 2010 | — |
Notes: Cooking guide based on the TV show America's Test Kitchen; Spiritual successor to Personal Trainer: Cooking; Developed by Indies Zero
| Art Academy | 19 June 2010 | 25 October 2010 | ^{EU} 6 August 2010^{AU} 23 September 2010 |
Notes: Known as Art Academy: Learn painting and drawing techniques with step-by-step training in Europe and Australia, and Artistic Taste Classroom DS (Note: Japanese: 絵心教室DS, Hepburn: Egokoro Kyōshitsu DS) in Japan; Not considered a Touch! Generations title in Japan; DSi enhanced; Developed by Headstrong Games
| Big Brain Academy | 30 June 2005 | 5 June 2006 | ^{AU} 5 July 2006^{EU} 7 July 2006 |
Notes: Known as Soft Head Academy (Note: Japanese: やわらかあたま塾, Hepburn: Yawaraka Atama Juku) in Japan; Includes five categories of tests, with three activities per category; A sequel, Big Brain Academy: Wii Degree, was released on the Wii; Developed by Nintendo EAD
| Brain Age: Train Your Brain in Minutes a Day! | 19 May 2005 | 16 April 2006 | ^{EU} 9 June 2006^{AU} 16 June 2006 |
Notes: Known as Dr Kawashima's Brain Training: How Old Is Your Brain? in Europe and Australia and as Tohoku University Future Technology Research Center Professor and Supervisor Ryuta Kawashima's Train Your Brain DS Training for Adults (Note: Japanese: 東北大学未来科学技術共同研究センター川島隆太教授監修 脳を鍛える大人のDSトレーニング, Hepburn: Tōhōku Daigaku Mirai Kagakugijutsu Kyōdōkenkyū Sentā Kawashima Ryūta Kyōju Kanshū: Nō o Kitaeru Otona no DS Torēningu) in Japan; Features a variety of puzzles, including stroop test, mathematical questions, and sudoku puzzles; Uses the built-in microphone for the DS; Developed by Nintendo SPD
| Brain Age 2: More Training in Minutes a Day! | 29 December 2005 | 20 August 2007 | ^{EU} 29 June 2007^{AU} 5 July 2007 |
Notes: Known as More Brain Training from Dr. Kawashima: How Old Is Your Brain? in Europe and Australia and as Tohoku University Future Technology Research Center Professor and Supervisor Ryuta Kawashima's More Train Your Brain DS Training for Adults (Note: Japanese: 東北大学未来科学技術共同研究センター川島隆太教授監修 もっと脳を鍛える大人のDSトレーニング, Hepburn: Tōhōku Daigaku Mirai Kagakugijutsu Kyōdōkenkyū Sentā Kawashima Ryūta Kyōju Kanshū: Motto Nō o Kitaeru Otona no DS Torēningu) in Japan; Sequel to Brain Age: Train Your Brain in Minutes a Day!; Developed by Nintendo SPD
| Clubhouse Games | 19 April 2007 | 9 October 2006 | ^{EU} 29 September 2006^{AU} 26 October 2006 |
Notes: Known as 42 All-Time Classics in Europe and as Wi-Fi Compatible: World's Everyone's Playing Encyclopedia (Note: Japanese: Wi-Fi対応 世界のだれでもアソビ大全, Hepburn: Wi-Fi Taiō: Sekai no Daredemo Asobi Taizen) in Japan; Re-release of Daredemo Asobi Taizen; Compilation of card, board and parlor games; Later released on DSiWare in Japan and North America; Developed by Agenda
| Cooking Guide: Can't Decide What to Eat? | 4 December 2008 | 24 November 2008 | ^{EU} 20 June 2008^{AU} 3 July 2008 |
Notes: Known as Meals of the World: Talking! DS Cooking Navigation (Note: Japanese: 世界のごはん しゃべる！DSお料理ナビ, Hepburn: Sekai no Gohan Shaberu! DS Oryōri Navi) in Japan and Personal Trainer: Cooking in North America; Developed by Indies Zero and Nintendo Software Technology
| Crosswords DS | — | 5 May 2008 | ^{AU} 12 June 2008 |
Notes: Features American-style crosswords, as well as word searches and anagrams; Later re-released in Europe and Australia as Nintendo Presents: Crossword Collection featuring new puzzles; Developed by Nuevo Retro Games and Nintendo Software Technology
| Daredemo Asobi Taizen (Note: Japanese: だれでもアソビ大全, Hepburn: Daredemo Asobi Taizen) | 3 November 2005 | — | — |
Notes: Translated as Everyone's Playing Encyclopedia; Later re-released worldwide as Clubhouse Games featuring extensive changes; Compilation of card, board and parlor games; Compared to Clubhouse Games, it features some different games, extensive graphical differences, and lacks Nintendo Wi-Fi connection, among other minor changes; Developed by Agenda
| DS Bimoji Training (Note: Japanese: DS美文字トレーニング, Hepburn: DS Bimoji Torēningu) | 13 March 2008 | — | — |
Notes: Translated as DS Beautiful Letter Training; Kanji calligraphy training game; Includes a "brush" – really just a long stylus – as a normal DS stylus would be unsuitable for this game; Developed by Indies Zero
| DS Uranai Seikatsu (Note: Japanese: DS占い生活, Hepburn: DS Uranai Seikatsu) | 15 January 2009 | — | — |
Notes: Translated as DS Fortune-Telling Life; Includes several forms of fortune-telling, such as tarot cards and palm reading; Developed by Jamsworks
| Electroplankton (Note: Japanese: エレクトロプランクトン, Hepburn: Erekutoropurankuton) | 7 April 2005 | 9 January 2006 | ^{EU} 7 July 2006 |
Notes: Music game; Developed by Indies Zero
| Elite Beat Agents | — | 6 November 2006 | ^{AU} 3 May 2007^{EU} 13 July 2007 |
Notes: Spiritual sequel to Osu! Tatakae! Ouendan, a Japanese-only rhythm game released in 2005; Only considered a Touch! Generations title in North America; Developed by iNiS
| English Training: Have Fun Improving Your Skills! | 26 January 2006 | — | ^{EU} 27 October 2006 |
Notes: Known as DS Training for Adults Who Aren't Good at English: English Language Trainer (Note: Japanese: 英語が苦手な大人のDSトレーニング えいご漬け, Hepburn: Eigo ga Nigate na Otona no DS Torēningu: Eigo Zuke) in Japan; Developed by Plato
| Face Training: Facial exercises to strengthen and relax from Fumiko Inudo | 7 August 2007 | — | ^{EU} 23 September 2010 |
Notes: Known as Facening for Rich Expressions to Boost Impressions: Face Training for Adults DS (Note: Japanese: フェイスニングで表情豊かに印象アップ 大人のDS顔トレーニング, Hepburn: Feisuningu de Hyōjō Yutaka ni Inshō Up: Otona no DS Kao Torēningu) in Japan; Uses a "facening scan" camera (connected to Slot 2 of the Nintendo DS) to read facial expressions; Released as Face Training in Europe without an external camera accessory, it was only available for the DSi due to the DSi's built-in camera; Developed by Intelligent Systems in collaboration with Japanese beauty expert Fumiko Inudo
| Flash Focus: Vision Training in Minutes a Day | 31 May 2007 | 15 October 2007 | ^{EU} 23 November 2007^{AU} 17 January 2008 |
Notes: Known as Sight Training: Enjoy Exercising and Relaxing Your Eyes in Europe & Australia and as Practice Your Sight With Training: DS Eye Training (Note: Japanese: 見る力を実践で鍛える DS眼力トレーニング, Hepburn: Miru Chikara wo Jissen de Kitaeru: DS Medikara Torēningu) in Japan; Developed by Nintendo SPD and Namco Bandai
| Ganbaru Watashi no Kakei Diary (Note: Japanese: がんばる私の家計ダイアリー, Hepburn: Ganbaru Watashi no Kakei Daiarī) | 12 July 2007 | — | — |
Notes: Translated as My Housekeeping Diary; Household budget planner; Developed by syn Sophia
| Hotel Dusk: Room 215 | 25 January 2007 | 22 January 2007 | ^{AU} 22 February 2007^{EU} 13 April 2007 |
Notes: Known as Wish Room: Angel's Memory (Note: Japanese: ウィッシュルーム 天使の記憶, Hepburn: Wisshu Rūmu: Tenshi no Kioku) in Japan; Supports the Nintendo DS Rumble Pak; Only considered a Touch! Generations title in North America; Developed by Cing
| Kanji Sonomama Rakubiki Jiten DS (Note: Japanese: 漢字そのまま DS楽引辞典, Hepburn: Kanji Sonomama Rakubiki Jiten DS) | 13 April 2006 | — | — |
Notes: Translated as Kanji as it is DS Easy Dictionary; Kanji-English-Japanese dictionary; Developed by Nintendo SPD and Intelligent Systems
| Kanshū Nippon Jōshikiryoku Kentei Kyōkai: Imasara Hito ni wa Kikenai Otona no Jōshikiryoku Training DS (Note: Japanese: 監修 日本常識力検定協会 いまさら人には聞けない 大人の常識力トレーニングDS, Hepburn: Kanshū Nippon Jōshikiryoku Kentei Kyōkai: Imasara Hito ni wa Kikenai Otona no Jōshikiryoku Torēningu DS) | 26 October 2006 | — | — |
Notes: Translated as Supervised by Japan Common Sense Aptitude Examination Association: Common Sense Training for Adults DS, but often referred to as just Common Sense Training; Based around topics that include courtesy/manners, society, intelligence, and eventually traffic, art, and music; Retail pre-orders accumulated to over one million, first week sales totaled 189,700, and as of July 2007, Common Sense Training has sold 1.53 million copies; Developed by HAL Laboratory
| Kenkō Ōen Recipe 1000: DS Kondate Zenshū (Note: Japanese: 健康応援レシピ1000 DS献立全集, Hepburn: Kenkō Ōen Reshipi 1000: DS Kondate Zenshū) | 7 December 2006 | — | — |
Notes: Translated as Health Boost Recipe 1000: DS Complete Menu; Cooking guide; Developed by Nintendo SPD
| Kotoba no Puzzle: Mojipittan DS (Note: Japanese: ことばのパズル もじぴったんDS, Hepburn: Kotoba no Pazuru: Mojipittan DS) | 15 March 2007 | — | — |
Notes: Translated as Word Puzzle: Mojipittan DS; Puzzle game; Developed by Namco
| Magnetica | 2 March 2006 | 5 June 2006 | ^{EU} 6 January 2007 |
Notes: Known as Shunkan Puzz Loop (Note: Japanese: 瞬感パズループ, Hepburn: Shunkan Pazurūpu) in Japan and as Actionloop in Europe; Re-released on WiiWare in 2008; Not considered a Touch! Generations title in Japan; Nintendo DS Rumble Pak compatible; Developed by Mitchell Corporation
| Make 10: A Journey of Numbers | 10 October 2007 | — | ^{AU} 4 September 2008^{EU} 26 September 2008 |
Notes: Known as Tashiten: A Story of Making 10 (Note: Japanese: タシテン たして10にする物語, Hepburn: Tashiten: Tashite 10 ni Suru Monogatari) in Japan; Only considered a Touch! Generations title in Australia; Developed by MuuMuu
| Master of Illusion | 16 November 2006 | 26 November 2007 | ^{AU} 13 December 2007^{EU} 14 March 2008 |
Notes: Known as Magic Encyclopedia (Note: Japanese: マジック大全, Hepburn: Majikku Taizen) in Japan and as Magic Made Fun: Perform Tricks That Will Amaze Your Friends! in Europe; Bundled with a branded deck of cards; Only considered a Touch! Generations title in Japan and North America; DSiWare versions released in 2009; Developed by Tenyo and 8ing
| Mystery Case Files: MillionHeir | — | 8 September 2008 | ^{AU} 16 October 2008^{EU} 6 February 2009 |
Notes: Hidden object game; Not considered a Touch! Generations title in Europe; Developed by Big Fish Games
| Nihon Keizai Shinbunsha Kanshū: Shiranai Mamade wa Son o Suru Mono ya Okane no Shikumi DS (Note: Japanese: 日本経済新聞社監修 知らないままでは損をする「モノやお金のしくみ」DS, Hepburn: Nihon Keizai Shinbunsha Kanshū: Shiranai Mamade wa Son o Suru Mono ya Okane no Shikumi DS) | 27 August 2009 | — | — |
Notes: Translated as You'll Incur Losses If You Remain Ignorant: How Money and Things Work DS; Educational title about economics endorsed by the Japanese newspaper The Nikkei; Developed by Nintendo
| Nintendogs | 21 April 2005 | 22 August 2005 | ^{AU} 22 September 2005^{EU} 7 October 2005 |
Notes: Originally released in three versions: Dachshund & Friends, Lab & Friends, and Chihuahua & Friends; Re-released versions include Best Friends (bundled with special edition Nintendo DS), and Dalmatian & Friends; Developed by Nintendo EAD
| Nintendo Presents: Crossword Collection | — | — | ^{AU} 17 December 2009^{EU} 18 December 2009 |
Notes: Re-release for Crosswords DS featuring British-style crosswords; Developed by Nuevo Retro Games and Nintendo Software Technology
| Personal Trainer: Walking | 1 November 2008 | 25 May 2009 | ^{EU} 5 June 2009 |
Notes: Known as A Life Rhythm that you can Understand by Walking DS (Note: Japanese: 歩いてわかる 生活リズムDS, Hepburn: Aruite Wakaru Seikatsu Rizumu DS) in Japan and as Walk with me! Do you know your walking routine? in Europe; Includes a pedometer accessory; Developed by Nintendo NSD and Creatures Inc.
| Picross 3D | 12 March 2009 | 3 May 2010 | ^{EU} 5 March 2010 |
Notes: Known as Solid Geometry Picross (Note: Japanese: 立体ピクロス, Hepburn: Rittai Pikurosu) in Japan; Not considered a Touch! Generations title in Japan; Developed by HAL Laboratory
| Picross DS (Note: Japanese: ピクロスDS, Hepburn: Pikurosu DS) | 25 January 2007 | 30 July 2007 | ^{EU} 11 May 2007^{AU} 7 June 2007 |
Notes: Successor to Mario's Picross; Developed by Jupiter
| Planet Puzzle League | 26 April 2007 | 4 June 2007 | ^{EU} 29 June 2007 |
Notes: Known as Puzzle League DS in Europe, and Panel de Pon DS (Note: Japanese: パネルでポンDS, Hepburn: Paneru de Pon DS) in Japan; Only considered a Touch! Generations title in North America; Developed by Intelligent Systems
| Practise English! | 29 March 2007 | — | ^{EU} 26 October 2007 |
Notes: Known as DS Training for Adults Who Aren't Good at English: More English Language Trainer (Note: Japanese: 英語が苦手な大人のDSトレーニング もっとえいご漬け, Hepburn: Eigo ga Nigate na Otona no DS Torēningu: Motto Eigo Zuke) in Japan; Sequel to English Training: Have Fun Improving Your Skills!; Developed by Plato
| Professor Kageyama's Maths Training: The Hundred Cell Calculation Method | 13 January 2007 | 12 January 2009 | ^{AU} 7 February 2008^{EU} 8 February 2008 |
Notes: Known as Personal Trainer: Math in North America and as Kageyama's Method for DS: "Masu X Masu Pre-Masu-Masu calculation, this is before Haku-Masu hundred!" (Note: Japanese: DS陰山メソッド「ます×ますプレ百ます計算 百ますの前にこれだよ！」, Hepburn: DS Kageyama Mesoddo: Masu x Masu Pure Hyaku Masu Keisan - Hyaku Masu no Maeni Kore Dayo!) in Japan; Not considered a Touch! Generations title in Japan; Developed by Jupiter
| Rakubiki Jiten DS (Note: Japanese: DS楽引辞典, Hepburn: Rakubiki Jiten DS) | 16 June 2005 | — | — |
Notes: Translated as Easy Dictionary DS; Dictionary and Japanese-to-English translator; Developed by Nintendo SPD
| Rhythm Heaven | 31 July 2008 | 5 April 2009 | ^{EU} 1 May 2009^{AU} 4 June 2009 |
Notes: Known as Rhythm Paradise in Europe, Rhythm Heaven Gold (Note: Japanese: リズム天国ゴールド, Hepburn: Rizumu Tengoku Gōrudo) in Japan and as Rhythm World in Korea; Sequel to the Japan-only Game Boy Advance title Rhythm Tengoku; Not considered a Touch! Generations title in North America; Developed by Nintendo SPD
| Shaberu! DS Oryōri Navi (Note: Japanese: しゃべる!DSお料理ナビ, Hepburn: Shaberu! DS Oryōri Navi) | 20 July 2006 | — | — |
Notes: Translated as Talking! DS Cooking Navigation; Cooking guide; Developed by Indies Zero
| Sudoku Gridmaster | 23 March 2006 | 26 June 2006 | ^{EU} 27 October 2006^{AU} 22 February 2007 |
Notes: Known as Puzzle Series Vol. 3: Sudoku in Japan and Sudoku Master in Europe; Not considered a Touch! Generations title in Japan; Developed by Hudson Soft
| Tabi no Yubisashi Kaiwachō DS (Note: Japanese: 旅の指さし会話帳DS, Hepburn: Tabi no Yubisashi Kaiwachō DS) | 20 April 2006 (Thai, Chūgoku and Kankoku); 27 April 2006 (America and Deutsch) | — | — |
Notes: Translated as Point-and-Speak Phrasebook for Travelling DS; Released in five volumes: Thai (Thailand), Chūgoku (China), Kankoku (South Korea), America (United States) and Deutsch (Germany); Developed by Tose
| Tetris DS (Note: Japanese: テトリスDS, Hepburn: Tetorisu DS) | 27 April 2006 | 20 March 2006 | ^{AU} 13 April 2006^{EU} 21 April 2006 |
Notes: Part of the Tetris video game series; Gameplay themes include Super Mario Bros., The Legend of Zelda, Metroid, Balloon Fight, Donkey Kong, and Yoshi's Cookie; Developed by Nintendo SPD
| Touch de Tanoshimu Hyakunin Isshu: DS Shigureden (Note: Japanese: タッチで楽しむ百人一首 DS時雨殿, Hepburn: Tatchi de Tanoshimu Hyakunin Isshu: DS Shigureden) | 14 December 2006 | — | — |
Notes: Title refers to the Ogura Hyakunin Isshu poems and the Shigureden museum; Adaptation of the card game Uta-garuta; Uses the Mobiclip video coded; Developed by Nintendo
| True Swing Golf | 10 November 2005 | 23 January 2006 | 25 November 2005 |
Notes: Known as Nintendo Touch Golf: Birdie Challenge in Europe, and DS Golf for Adults (Note: Japanese: 大人のDSゴルフ, Hepburn: Otona no DS Gorufu) in Japan; Only considered a Touch! Generations title in North America; Developed by T&E Soft

== Games for Wii ==
The video games published under the Touch! Generations brand for the Wii vary between countries. Organized alphabetically by title:

| Title | Original release date | | |
| Title | Japan | North America | PAL region |
|---|---|---|---|
| Another Code: R – A Journey into Lost Memories | 5 February 2009 | — | ^{EU} 26 June 2009 |
Notes: Known as Another Code: R – Memory's Door (Note: Japanese: アナザーコード：Ｒ 記憶の扉, Hepburn: Anazā Kōdo: R – Kioku no Tobira) in Japan; Sequel to Another Code: Two Memories (known as Trace Memory in North America); Only considered a Touch! Generations title in Europe; Developed by Cing
| Big Brain Academy: Wii Degree | 26 April 2007 | 11 June 2007 | ^{EU} 20 July 2007^{AU} 8 November 2007 |
Notes: Known as Big Brain Academy for Wii in Europe and Australia, and Soft Head Academy for Wii (Note: Japanese: Wiiでやわらかあたま塾, Hepburn: Wii de Yawaraka Atama Juku) in Japan; Sequel to Big Brain Academy; Includes 15 mini-games, divided into 5 categories; First Wii game launched as a Touch! Generations title; Developed by Nintendo EAD
| Endless Ocean | 2 August 2007 | 21 January 2008 | ^{EU} 9 November 2007^{AU} 17 January 2008 |
Notes: Known as Forever Blue in Japan; Only considered a Touch! Generations title in Europe; Developed by Arika
| Endless Ocean 2: Adventures of the Deep | 17 September 2009 | 22 February 2010 | ^{EU} 5 February 2010^{AU} 25 February 2010 |
Notes: Known as Endless Ocean: Blue World in North America and as Forever Blue: Call of the Ocean (Note: Japanese: FOREVER BLUE: 海の呼び声, Hepburn: Forever Blue: Umi no Yobigoe) in Japan; Sequel to Endless Ocean; Only considered a Touch! Generations title in Europe; Developed by Arika
| Minna no Jōshikiryoku TV (Note: Japanese: みんなの常識力テレビ, Hepburn: Minna no Jōshikiryoku Terebi) | 6 March 2008 | — | — |
Notes: Translated as Everyone's Common Sense TV; Successor to Kanshū Nippon Jōshikiryoku Kentei Kyōkai: Imasara Hito ni wa Kikenai Otona no Jōshikiryoku Training DS for the DS; Developed by HAL Laboratory
| Wii Chess | 30 September 2008 | — | ^{EU} 18 January 2008 |
Notes: Known as Communication Game: World Chess (Note: Japanese: 通信対局 ワールドチェス, Hepburn: Tsūshin Taikyoku: Wārudo Chesu) in Japan; Only considered a Touch! Generations title in Europe; Only released via WiiWare in Japan; Developed by Lancarse
| Wii Fit | 1 December 2007 | 21 May 2008 | ^{EU} 25 April 2008^{AU} 8 May 2008 |
Notes: Bundled with Wii Balance Board; Includes 50 different activities, divided into 4 categories; In North America, Wii Fit was launched on 19 May 2008, with an exclusive release at the Nintendo World Store in New York City, two days before the general release; Developed by Nintendo EAD
| Wii Fit Plus | 1 October 2009 | 4 October 2009 | ^{AU} 15 October 2009^{EU} 30 October 2009 |
Notes: Bundled with Wii Balance Board or separately; Adds 15 new balance games and 6 new yoga and strength training activities; Includes all of the original activities from Wii Fit; Developed by Nintendo EAD
| Wii Music | 16 October 2008 | 20 October 2008 | ^{AU} 13 November 2008^{EU} 14 November 2008 |
Notes: Includes 66 playable musical instruments; Compatible with the Wii Balance Board; Developed by Nintendo EAD
| Wii Party | 8 July 2010 | 3 October 2010 | ^{AU} 7 October 2010^{EU} 8 October 2010 |
Notes: Not considered a Touch! Generations title in North America; Developed by NDcube
| Wii Play | 2 December 2006 | 12 February 2007 | ^{AU} 7 December 2006^{EU} 8 December 2006 |
Notes: Known as Your First Step to Wii (Note: Japanese: はじめてのWii, Hepburn: Hajimete no Wii) in Japan; Bundled with Wii Remote; Only considered a Touch! Generations title in Japan and Australia; Released before launch of Touch! Generations for Wii; Developed by Nintendo EAD
| Wii Sports | 2 December 2006 | 19 November 2006 | ^{AU} 7 December 2006^{EU} 8 December 2006 |
Notes: Pack-in with Wii console; Includes five sports games; Not considered a Touch! Generations title in North America; Released before launch of Touch! Generations for Wii; Later re-released along with Wii Sports Resort in Europe and Australia as Wii Sports + Wii Sports Resort; this 2-in-1 disc is also considered a Touch! Generations title; Developed by Nintendo EAD
| Wii Sports Resort | 25 June 2009 | 26 July 2009 | ^{AU} 23 July 2009^{EU} 24 July 2009 |
Notes: Bundled with Wii MotionPlus; Not considered a Touch! Generations title in Japan or North America; Includes nine new sports games plus two of the original from Wii Sports and one from Wii Play; Later re-released along with Wii Sports in Europe and Australia as Wii Sports + Wii Sports Resort; this 2-in-1 disc is also considered a Touch! Generations title; Developed by Nintendo EAD
