= List of best-selling Nintendo DS video games =

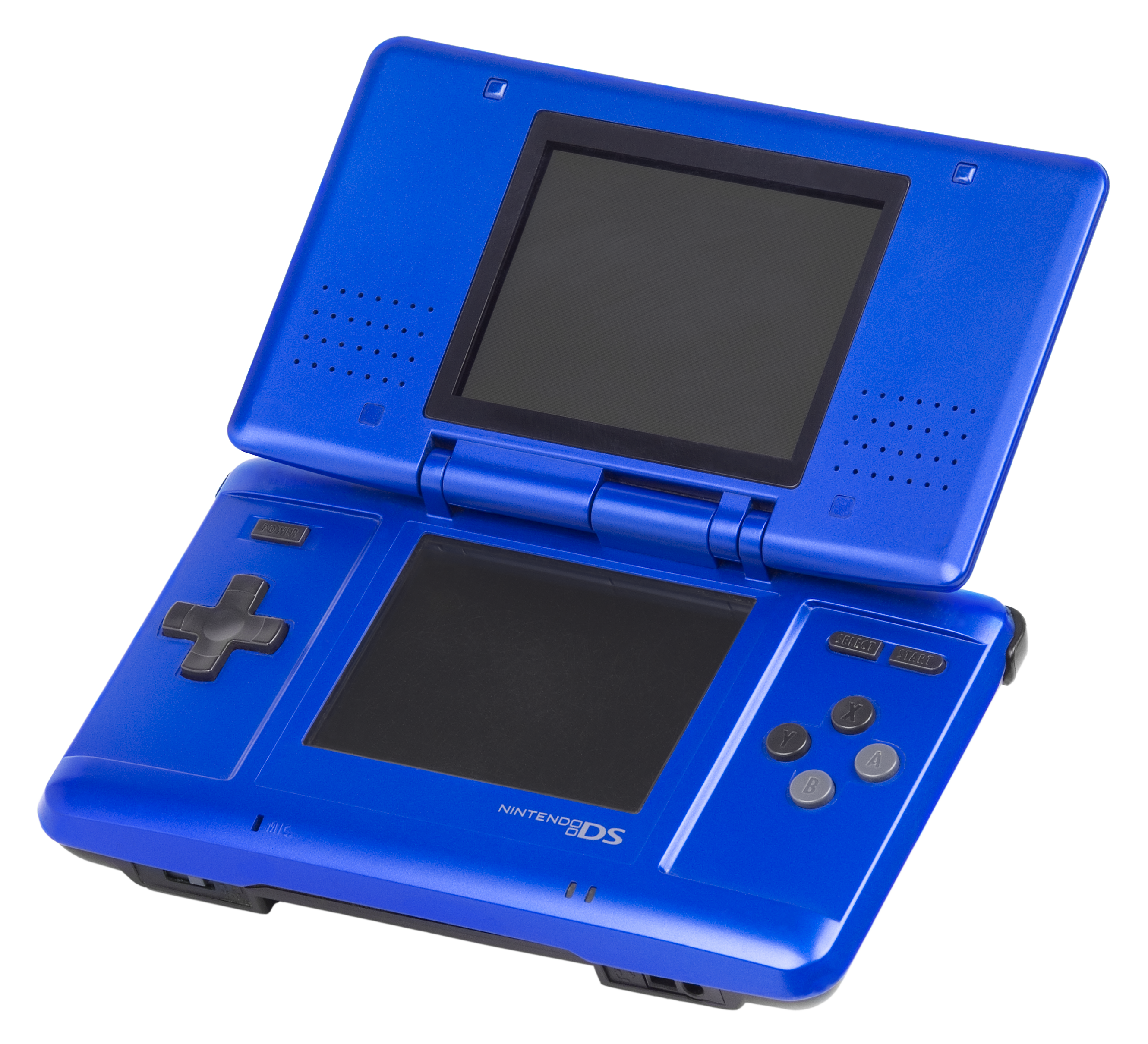
Nintendo DS

This is a list of video games for the Nintendo DS video game console that have sold or shipped at least one million copies. The best-selling game on the Nintendo DS is New Super Mario Bros. First released in North America on May 15, 2006, it went on to sell nearly 31 million units worldwide.

There are a total of 76 Nintendo DS games on this list which are confirmed to have sold or shipped at least one million units. Of these, 18 were developed by internal Nintendo development divisions. Of the 76 games on this list, 51 were published in one or more regions by Nintendo.

By September 30, 2022, over 948.76 million total copies of games had been sold for the Nintendo DS. As of March 31, 2025, there are a total of 139 Nintendo DS games that have sold at least one million units.

== List ==
Game	Copies sold	Release date (Note: Only the initial release date on this platform is listed.)	Developer(s)	Publisher(s)
New Super Mario Bros.	30.80 million	May 15, 2006	Nintendo EAD (Group 4)	Nintendo
Nintendogs (all versions)	23.96 million	April 21, 2005	Nintendo EAD (Group 1)	Nintendo
Mario Kart DS	23.60 million	November 14, 2005	Nintendo EAD (Group 1)	Nintendo
Brain Age: Train Your Brain in Minutes a Day!	19.01 million	May 19, 2005	Nintendo SPD	Nintendo
Pokémon Diamond and Pearl	17.67 million	September 28, 2006	Game Freak	The Pokémon Company; Nintendo
Pokémon Black and White	15.64 million	September 18, 2010	Game Freak	The Pokémon Company; Nintendo
Brain Age 2: More Training in Minutes a Day!	14.88 million	December 29, 2005	Nintendo SPD	Nintendo
Pokémon HeartGold and SoulSilver	12.72 million	September 12, 2009	Game Freak	The Pokémon Company; Nintendo
Animal Crossing: Wild World	11.75 million	November 23, 2005	Nintendo EAD (Group 2)	Nintendo
Super Mario 64 DS	11.06 million	November 21, 2004	Nintendo EAD	Nintendo
Mario Party DS	9.31 million	November 8, 2007	Hudson Soft	Nintendo
Pokémon Black 2 and White 2	8.52 million	June 23, 2012	Game Freak	The Pokémon Company; Nintendo
Pokémon Platinum	7.60 million	September 13, 2008	Game Freak	The Pokémon Company; Nintendo
Big Brain Academy	6.15 million	June 30, 2005	Nintendo EAD (Group 4)	Nintendo
Dragon Quest IX: Sentinels of the Starry Skies	5.5 million	July 11, 2009	Level-5	JP: Square Enix; WW: Nintendo
Pokémon Mystery Dungeon: Explorers of Time and Explorers of Darkness	4.88 million	September 13, 2007	Chunsoft	The Pokémon Company; Nintendo
Lego Star Wars: The Complete Saga	4.76 million	November 6, 2007	Traveller's Tales	LucasArts
The Legend of Zelda: Phantom Hourglass	4.76 million	June 23, 2007	Nintendo EAD (Group 3)	Nintendo
Mario & Luigi: Bowser's Inside Story	4.56 million	February 11, 2009	AlphaDream	Nintendo
Professor Layton and the Curious Village	4.49 million	February 15, 2007	Level-5	JP: Level-5; WW: Nintendo
Mario & Sonic at the Olympic Games	4.22 million	January 17, 2008	Sega Sports R&D	JP: Nintendo; WW: Sega
English Training: Have Fun Improving Your Skills!	3.91 million	January 26, 2006	Nintendo SPD	Nintendo
Professor Layton and the Diabolical Box	3.88 million	November 29, 2007	Level-5	JP: Level-5; WW: Nintendo
Tomodachi Collection	3.76 million	June 18, 2009	Nintendo SPD (Group 1)	Nintendo
Pokémon Mystery Dungeon: Blue Rescue Team	3.49 million	November 17, 2005	Chunsoft	The Pokémon Company; Nintendo
Yoshi's Island DS	3.36 million	November 13, 2006	Artoon	Nintendo
Flash Focus: Vision Training in Minutes a Day	3.23 million	May 31, 2007	Nintendo SPD; Namco Bandai	Nintendo
Rhythm Heaven	3.04 million	July 31, 2008	Nintendo SPD; TNX Music Recordings	Nintendo
Professor Layton and the Unwound Future	3.02 million	November 27, 2008	Level-5	JP: Level-5; WW: Nintendo
Professor Kageyama's Maths Training: The Hundred Cell Calculation Method	3 million	December 7, 2006	Jupiter	JP: Shogakukan; WW: Nintendo
Kirby Super Star Ultra	2.99 million	September 29, 2008	HAL Laboratory	Nintendo
Mario vs. Donkey Kong: Mini-Land Mayhem!	2.98 million	November 14, 2010	Nintendo Software Technology	Nintendo
Style Savvy	2.98 million	October 23, 2008	Syn Sophia	Nintendo
The Legend of Zelda: Spirit Tracks	2.96 million	December 7, 2009	Nintendo EAD (Group 3)	Nintendo
Pokémon Ranger	2.93 million	March 23, 2006	HAL Laboratory; Creatures Inc.	The Pokémon Company; Nintendo
Tetris DS	2.74 million	March 20, 2006	Nintendo SPD (Group 2)	Nintendo
Clubhouse Games	2.57 million	November 3, 2005	Agenda	Nintendo
WarioWare: Touched!	2.47 million	December 2, 2004	Nintendo SPD (Group 1); Intelligent Systems	Nintendo
Pokémon Ranger: Shadows of Almia	2.35 million	March 20, 2008	Creatures Inc.	The Pokémon Company; Nintendo
Art Academy	2.33 million	June 19, 2010	Headstrong Games; Nintendo SPD	Nintendo
Final Fantasy III	2.3 million	August 24, 2006	Matrix Software	Square Enix
Kirby: Squeak Squad	2.27 million	November 2, 2006	HAL Laboratory; Flagship	Nintendo
Cooking Mama	2.26 million (Note: Cooking Mama sales breakdown: Europe – 1 million; Japan – 62,000; United States – 1.2 million)	March 23, 2006	Office Create	JP: Taito; NA: Majesco; PAL: 505 Games
Cooking Guide: Can't Decide What to Eat?	2.17 million	June 20, 2008	indieszero; Nintendo NSD	Nintendo
Professor Layton and the Last Specter	2.06 million	November 26, 2009	Level-5	JP: Level-5; WW: Nintendo
Mario Hoops 3-on-3	2.03 million	July 27, 2006	Square Enix	Nintendo
Dragon Quest Monsters: Joker 2	2 million	April 28, 2010	Tose	JP: Square Enix; WW: Nintendo
Dragon Quest Monsters: Joker	1.9 million	December 28, 2006	Tose	Square Enix
Mario & Luigi: Partners in Time	1.73 million	November 28, 2005	AlphaDream	Nintendo
Super Princess Peach	1.7 million	October 20, 2005	Tose	Nintendo
Dragon Quest V: Hand of the Heavenly Bride	1.7 million	July 17, 2008	ArtePiazza	Square Enix
Dragon Quest VI: Realms of Revelation	1.7 million	January 28, 2010	ArtePiazza	Nintendo
Kingdom Hearts 358/2 Days	1.7 million	May 30, 2009	h.a.n.d.	Square Enix
Common Sense Training	1.68 million	October 26, 2006	HAL Laboratory	Nintendo
Dragon Quest IV: Chapters of the Chosen	1.6 million	November 22, 2007	ChunSoft	Enix
Sonic Rush	1.6 million	November 15, 2005	Dimps; Sonic Team	Sega
Diddy Kong Racing DS	1.59 million	February 5, 2007	Rare	Nintendo
Pokémon Ranger: Guardian Signs	1.53 million	March 6, 2010	Creatures Inc.	The Pokémon Company; Nintendo
Mario vs. Donkey Kong 2: March of the Minis	1.52 million	September 25, 2006	Nintendo Software Technology	Nintendo
Pokémon Mystery Dungeon: Explorers of Sky	1.49 million	April 18, 2009	Chunsoft	Nintendo
Tamagotchi Connection: Corner Shop	1.48 million	September 15, 2005	NanaOn-Sha	Bandai
Guitar Hero: On Tour	1.4 million (Note: Guitar Hero: On Tour sales breakdown: France – 100,000; United Kingdom – 200,000; United States – 1.1 million)	June 22, 2008	Activision	Activision
Hannah Montana	1.3 million	October 10, 2006	DC Studios	Buena Vista Games
MySims	1.3 million (Note: MySims sales breakdown: United Kingdom – 300,000; United States – 1 million)	September 18, 2007	Tose	Electronic Arts
Kirby Mass Attack	1.22 million	August 4, 2011	HAL Laboratory	Nintendo
High School Musical: Makin' the Cut!	1.2 million	August 14, 2007	A2M	Buena Vista Games
Final Fantasy IV	1.2 million	December 20, 2007	Matrix Software	Square Enix
Inazuma Eleven 2: Firestorm and Blizzard	1.18 million	October 1, 2009	Level-5	Nintendo
Love and Berry DS Collection	1.12 million	November 22, 2006	Sega	Sega
Chrono Trigger	1.10 million	November 20, 2008	Square Enix	Square Enix
Tamagotchi Connection: Corner Shop 2	1.09 million	July 27, 2006	Dimps	Namco Bandai Games
Metroid Prime Hunters	1.08 million	June 1, 2006	Nintendo Software Technology	Nintendo
Final Fantasy XII: Revenant Wings	1.04 million (Note: Final Fantasy XII: Revenant Wings sales breakdown: Europe – 280,000; Japan – 540,000; North America – 220,000)	April 26, 2007	Square Enix	Square Enix
Drawn to Life	1 million	September 10, 2007	5th Cell	THQ
Scribblenauts	1 million	September 15, 2009	5th Cell	Warner Bros. Interactive Entertainment
Spectrobes	1 million	March 6, 2007	Jupiter Corporation	Disney Interactive Studios
Pony Friends	1 million	May 18, 2007	Tantalus Media	Eidos Interactive

== See also ==
- List of best-selling Nintendo video games
