= Big Brain Academy (video game) =

2005 video game

- PAL region box art
- Developer: Nintendo EAD
- Publisher: Nintendo
- Director: Tomoaki Yoshinobu
- Producer: Hiroyuki Kimura
- Designer: Hideki Fujii
- Composer: Kenta Nagata
- Series: Big Brain Academy
- Platform: Nintendo DS
- Release: JP: June 30, 2005; NA: June 5, 2006; AU: July 5, 2006; EU: July 7, 2006
- Genres: Puzzle, edutainment
- Modes: Single-player, multiplayer

Big Brain Academy (Note: Known in Japan as Yawaraka Atama Juku (やわらかあたま塾, lit. "Soft Head Academy").) is a puzzle video game published and developed by Nintendo for the Nintendo DS handheld video game console. It was released in Japan on June 30, 2005, and subsequently in other regions in summer 2006. The game was planned to be released in China for the iQue DS system and appeared in the system's trailer, but it remained unreleased. It has been compared to Brain Age: Train Your Brain in Minutes a Day!. It was marketed under Nintendo's Touch! Generations brand. Two sequels, Big Brain Academy: Wii Degree, released on the Wii in April 2007, and Big Brain Academy: Brain vs. Brain, released on the Nintendo Switch in December 2021.

== Gameplay ==
In Big Brain Academy, tests are done to measure the player's brain's mass. The heavier the brain, the smarter the brain is or the better its reaction time. There is no single game mechanism to Big Brain Academy; as it is an assortment of puzzles with no one puzzle having greater priority than the other. Solving puzzles adds to the brain mass, while failing puzzles reduces the brain mass. The better the player does, the more difficult the puzzles become.

There are three modes of play: Test mode, Practice mode, and Versus mode.

=== Test mode ===
Test mode consists of a formal test containing five puzzles, with one puzzle taken at random from each of the five categories to determine the player's brain mass. Each puzzle lasts one minute.

After the test, the player is given a letter grade. Dr. Lobe (the "headmaster" of Big Brain Academy) also assesses what areas the player needs to improve in and what ranking they would be. Professions include museum curator, librarian, astronaut, investor, fashion stylist, diplomat, caveman, Isaac Newton, Leonardo da Vinci, Michelangelo, politician, poet, banker, doctor, musician, etc.

There are five different categories of tests with three activities per category. The categories are (followed by their activities):

- Think (logic-themed puzzles)
- Analyze (reason-based puzzles)
- Compute (math-themed puzzles)
- Identify (visual-themed puzzles)
- Memorize (memory-based puzzles)

=== Practice mode ===
Practice mode allows the player to select an activity to train their brain. The activities available for play are the same as those available in Test mode, and activities last one minute. Each activity has three levels of difficulty, and the player can earn a bronze, silver, gold, or platinum medal for achieving a certain brain mass on each difficulty level. A mass of 50 grams is required for a bronze medal, 150 grams for silver, and 250 for gold. The mass required for a platinum medal differs for each difficulty level of each activity; however, the exact mass required for each platinum medal is not specified in the game.

=== Versus mode ===
In Versus mode, players can compete to determine who has the heaviest brain. One to seven players can join a hosting player, whether or not they have a copy of the game.

== Reception ==
Reception

Review scores
| Publication | Score |
|---|---|
| Eurogamer | 7/10 |
| GameSpot | 7/10 |
| IGN | 8.1/10 |
| Jeuxvideo.com | 13/20 |

As of March 31, 2008, Big Brain Academy had sold 5.01 million copies worldwide. It received a "Double Platinum" sales award from the Entertainment and Leisure Software Publishers Association (ELSPA), indicating sales of at least 600,000 copies in the United Kingdom. It went on to sell 6.15 million copies worldwide as of 2022. Big Brain Academy received mixed reviews from critics. Jeff Gerstmann of GameSpot wrote positively of the game, describing it as "easy-to-learn but reasonably addictive". Craig Harris of IGN gave the game 8.1 out of 10, describing it as "fun", while criticising the game's graphics as "a bit too sugary and happy". Tom Bramwell of Eurogamer gave a mixed review of the game, giving it 7 out of 10, describing it as "fun in an innocent kind of way", while criticising it as too simple.

== See also ==
- Brain Age and Brain Age 2
- Brain Boost
- Brain Challenge
- English Training: Have Fun Improving Your Skills!
- Flash Focus: Vision Training in Minutes a Day
- Minna de Kitaeru Zenno Training
- Professor Kageyama's Maths Training: The Hundred Cell Calculation Method
