= Brain Challenge =

2007 video game

- Developer: Gameloft Beijing
- Publishers: Gameloft; Ubisoft
- Producers: Philippe Laurens; Tanguy Pallier; Fabrice Ottomanelli
- Designers: Stanislas Dewavrin; Wang Zhen Zhong; Tan Zhen
- Artists: Arthur Hugot; Christophe Latour
- Composer: Henri-Pierre Pellegrin
- Platforms: Mobile phone, iOS, iPod, Mac OS X, Nintendo DS, PlayStation 3, PlayStation Portable, Xbox 360, N-Gage 2.0, Wii
- Release: Mobile, iPod: September 5, 2007; Nintendo DS, PC: January 8, 2008; PlayStation 3: November 27, 2008; PlayStation Portable: December 3, 2008; Xbox 360: March 12, 2008; N-Gage 2.0: April 3, 2008 iOS: July 9, 2008; Wii: JP: October 14, 2008; EU: November 7, 2008; NA: November 10, 2008; Nintendo DS: JP: March 10, 2010; PAL: July 3, 2009; NA: July 13, 2009; Mac OS X: January 20, 2011
- Genre: Puzzle
- Modes: Single-player, Multiplayer

Brain Challenge is a mental exercise video game, featuring "brain exercise puzzles". The game was developed by Gameloft Beijing for mobile phone and iPod and released on September 5, 2007. In 2008 was followed by a Nintendo DS version on January 8, an Xbox Live Arcade release on March 12, and a PlayStation 3 launch on November 27. The N-Gage 2.0 version was released on the day of the service's launch, April 3, 2008. A version for WiiWare was released in autumn 2008 on all three regions. The Wii version also uses Miis for the players profile. OnLive also had launched their new streaming game platform with Brain Challenge on July 27, 2010. The game was released for Mac OS X in January 2011.

== Gameplay ==
The game is structured like Big Brain Academy in that puzzles are divided into four separate categories: Logic, Math, Visual, and Focus; the Xbox Live Arcade version, PlayStation 3, PSP, Wii, Nintendo DS, and PC add a fifth category, Memory. The puzzles can be played at three difficulty levels and more complex puzzles are unlocked through a player's progression through the game.

Many of the puzzles are similar to those from both Big Brain Academy and Brain Age. For example, Balance shows different objects on scales, and the player must determine from the relationships on the scales which is the heaviest object. In the Trout Route test, the player must follow a path based on the progressive numerical relationship given (i.e. +2, -3, etc.). Travelling requires the player to memorize a route of arrows, while Ascending has the player determining the order of a group of objects from least to most in amount. Bouncing Ball has the player determining as quick as possible which ball bounces highest.

=== Game modes ===
The game features two modes:

- Test: The difficulty level automatically adjusts throughout the game based on performance.
- Free Training (Training Room on the XBLA version): Allows the player to select exercises of their choice at three available levels (Easy, Medium, Hard).

The XBLA, PlayStation 3, and Nintendo DS versions also feature additional modes:

- Creative (available on PS3 with an add-on pack): A relaxing mode in which the player can doodle drawings or shoot fireworks.
- Stress: A more stressful test mode than the basic Test mode, which adds distracting noises and visuals, such as forcing the player to do two disparate actions at once, or dealing with distracting images or insects on the screen. It is also playable on the PlayStation 3.
- Kid mode (available on PS3 with an add-on pack): A multiplayer mode that allows younger players to play.
- Personal coach: A user-selected AI coach that accompanies the player through various modes.
- Brain charts: Detailed stats and graphs tracking past gameplay.

== Multiplayer ==
The Xbox Live Arcade, PlayStation Network, and OnLive versions features up to four player offline and online Xbox Live multiplayer, as well as online leaderboards. The mobile phone version also features an online leaderboard.

== Reception ==
Reception

Aggregate score
Aggregator	Score						
Aggregator	DS	iOS	mobile	PS3	PSP	Wii	Xbox 360
Metacritic	68/100	N/A	N/A	N/A	N/A	62/100	54/100

Review scores
Publication	Score						
Publication	DS	iOS	mobile	PS3	PSP	Wii	Xbox 360
Eurogamer	5/10	N/A	N/A	N/A	N/A	N/A	N/A
GameSpot	N/A	N/A	N/A	N/A	N/A	N/A	5.5/10
IGN	7.5/10	7.9/10	8.3/10	7.2/10	7.2/10	7.5/10	7.2/10
Pocket Gamer	N/A	4/5	4/5	N/A	N/A	N/A	N/A

The mobile phone and iPod versions were very well received, including an 8.3/10 from IGN for the wireless version, which praised "[the] majority of the puzzles are good and the production values are strong". Pocket Gamer raved about the iPod version in its 8 of 10 review: "It's almost a no-brainer to recommend Brain Challenge. It's enjoyable, invigorating and there's a remarkable amount [of gameplay] in it".

IGN's review for the Nintendo DS version was less enthusiastic, but still singled out the Stress Test as an innovative twist to the brain exercise game formula, as was its review of the Xbox Live Arcade version, though it did mention that "there's quite a bit of depth to Brain Challenge... Making your way through Brain Challenge could take a very, very long time". DS Fanboy's review was more generous with an 8/10 review, and while calling it "an odd little game", it praised "lots of replay value, interesting unlockables, and loads of content make up for the title's flaws".

Team Xbox panned the Xbox Live Arcade version in its 4/10 review: "It doesn't take a whole lot of brain power to figure out that this is one title best left on the shelf". GameSpot's negative review (5.5/10) was: "...Only a handful of these stand-alone minigames resemble anything of interest".

== Sequels ==
A sequel, Brain Challenge Vol. 2: Stress Management, was released by Gameloft for mobile phones in 2007. Another sequel, Brain Challenge 3: Think Again!, was released by Gameloft for mobile, iPod Touch, iPhone in September 2009. (Note: The iPhone and iPod touch version was called Brain Challenge 2: Think Again!.) In 2012, Brain Challenge 4: Breaking Limits was released for mobile phones.

== See also ==
- Brain Age and Brain Age 2
- Brain Boost
- English Training: Have Fun Improving Your Skills!
- Flash Focus: Vision Training in Minutes a Day
- Minna de Kitaeru Zenno Training
- Professor Kageyama's Maths Training The Hundred Cell Calculation Method
