= Personal trainer (disambiguation) =

A personal trainer is someone who creates and delivers exercise programs.

Personal trainer may also refer to:

- Personal Trainer (band), a Dutch indie rock band
- "The Personal Trainer", an episode of the television series Matlock
- Personal Trainer: Cooking, a cooking video game
- Personal Trainer: Math, a puzzle video game
- Personal Trainer: Walking, a fitness game
