= Professor Brainium's Games =

2008 video game

- Developer: Frontline Studios
- Publisher: Bold Games
- Platform: Nintendo DS
- Release: NA: May 8, 2008
- Genre: Puzzle
- Modes: Single-player, multiplayer

Professor Brainium's Games is an educational video game by Polish developer Frontline Studios released exclusively for the Nintendo DS in 2008. The purpose of the game is to inform the player by providing various puzzles, which they must complete to progress further. The game is similar to Brain Age and Big Brain Academy in its format and style of play.

== See also ==
- Brain Age
- Big Brain Academy
- Nintendo DS
