= Walk with me! Do you know your walking routine? =

2008 video game

- PAL region box art
- Developers: Nintendo NSD; Creatures Inc.
- Publisher: Nintendo
- Directors: Naoya Morimura; Hirofumi Matsuoka; Toyohisa Tanabe
- Producers: Kiyoshi Mizuki; Shinya Kawada
- Designer: Takayuki Nakayama
- Programmer: Kazunari Usui
- Artists: Kazuya Yoshioka; Yuka Kotaki
- Composer: Yasumasa Yamada
- Platform: Nintendo DS
- Release: 2008
- Genre: Exergaming
- Mode: Single-player

Walk with me! Do you know your walking routine? ^{JPN} ^{NA}, known in North America as Personal Trainer: Walking, is a 2008 exergaming application developed by Nintendo Network Service Development (Nintendo NSD) and Creatures Inc. for the Nintendo DS. The pedometer accessory was developed in-house at Nintendo NSD, while the software portion was developed in conjunction with Nintendo NSD, Creatures Inc., and Engines.

It is part of both Nintendo's Touch! Generations brand and the Personal Trainer series. It is one of only five Nintendo DS titles to support Mii characters, three of which are Japan exclusives. In North America, it is part of the Personal Trainer series.

== Overview ==
Walk with me! Do you know your walking routine? allows up to four users to track their walking, jogging or running activities through a series of graphs, charts and statistics, as well as set goals for themselves. The game is packaged with two infrared pedometers that communicate to the game the user's walking data. Additional pedometers are sold separately.

The game uses Miis to track each user's progress, and allows users to either create a Mii in-game (A first for the Nintendo DS), or wirelessly transfer an existing Mii from a Wii console's Mii Channel to their Nintendo DS. The game also features a number of minigames to unlock, and users can also upload their data online via the Nintendo Wi-Fi Connection to add to weekly leaderboards and a world step count that plots a virtual trek across the Solar System.

== Reception ==
Official Nintendo Magazine scored the game 75%, noting the health benefits of exercising and addictiveness of following statistics, but also noted the inherent pointlessness of the game.

IGN scored it 7/10, describing it as a "decent encouragement to get off the couch".

The game sold 26,000 copies in its first week in Japan.

== See also ==
- List of Nintendo DS games
- Personal Trainer: Cooking
- Personal Trainer: Math
- Brain Age: Train Your Brain in Minutes a Day!
- Brain Age 2: More Training in Minutes a Day!

== Notes ==
Known in Japan as Aruite Wakaru Seikatsu Rhythm DS (歩(ある)いてわかる 生活(せいかつ)リズムDS, Aruite Wakaru Seikatsu Rhythm DS; lit.A Life Rhythm that you can Understand by Walking DS)

Known in North America as Personal Trainer: Walking
