= Brain Age 2: More Training in Minutes a Day! =

2005 video game

- North American box art
- Developer: Nintendo SPD
- Publisher: Nintendo
- Director: Kouichi Kawamoto
- Producer: Shinya Takahashi
- Programmers: Shinji Kitahara; Yoshinori Katsuki; Jun Ito; Yuichiro Ito
- Composer: Minako Hamano
- Series: Brain Age
- Platform: Nintendo DS
- Release: JP: December 29, 2005; EU: June 29, 2007; AU: July 5, 2007; NA: August 20, 2007
- Genres: Puzzle, edutainment
- Modes: Single-player, multiplayer

Brain Age 2: More Training in Minutes a Day! (stylized as Brain Age^{2}), known as More Brain Training from Dr Kawashima: How Old Is Your Brain? in PAL regions, (Note: In Japan, the game is known as Tōhōku Daigaku Mirai Kagakugijutsu Kyōdōkenkyū Sentā Kawashima Ryūta Kyōju Kanshū: Motto Nō o Kitaeru Otona no DS Training (東北大学未来科学技術共同研究センター川島隆太教授監修 もっと脳を鍛える大人のDSトレーニング, Tōhōku Daigaku Mirai Kagakugijutsu Kyōdōkenkyū Sentā Kawashima Ryūta Kyōju Kanshū: Motto Nō o Kitaeru Otona no Dī Esu Torēningu; lit. "Tohoku University Future Technology Research Center Professor and Supervisor Ryuta Kawashima's More Train Your Brain DS Training For Adults").) is an edutainment puzzle game and the sequel to Brain Age: Train Your Brain in Minutes a Day! (2005). It was developed and published by Nintendo for the Nintendo DS handheld game console. Before the game begins, the player must perform a Brain Age Check to determine their brain age, which ranges from 20 to 80, to determine approximately their brain's responsiveness. A brain age of 20, the lowest age that the player can achieve, indicates that the player's brain is as responsive as that of an average 20-year-old. After the player is told their initial brain age, they can complete a series of minigames to help improve their brain's responsiveness, after which they can run Brain Age Check again to determine their updated brain age.

Critics were generally favorable towards Brain Age 2, which received aggregated scores of 77% from Metacritic and 79.04% from GameRankings. Praise focused on improvements made on Brain Age, while criticism targeted the game's inability to consistently understand written and spoken answers. The game was voted IGN's Reader's Game of the Month for August 2007. In the United States, it was the 13th best-selling game in its debut month, and climbed to 9th place in September 2007, selling 141,000 copies in that month. In Japan, Brain Age 2 was the best-selling game in its debut month, selling 1,084,857 units. As of July 2007, 5.33 million copies of Brain Age 2 have been sold in Japan. As of March 31, 2013, the game's worldwide sales have reached 14.88 million and it is seventh on the Nintendo DS best-sellers list.

== Gameplay ==
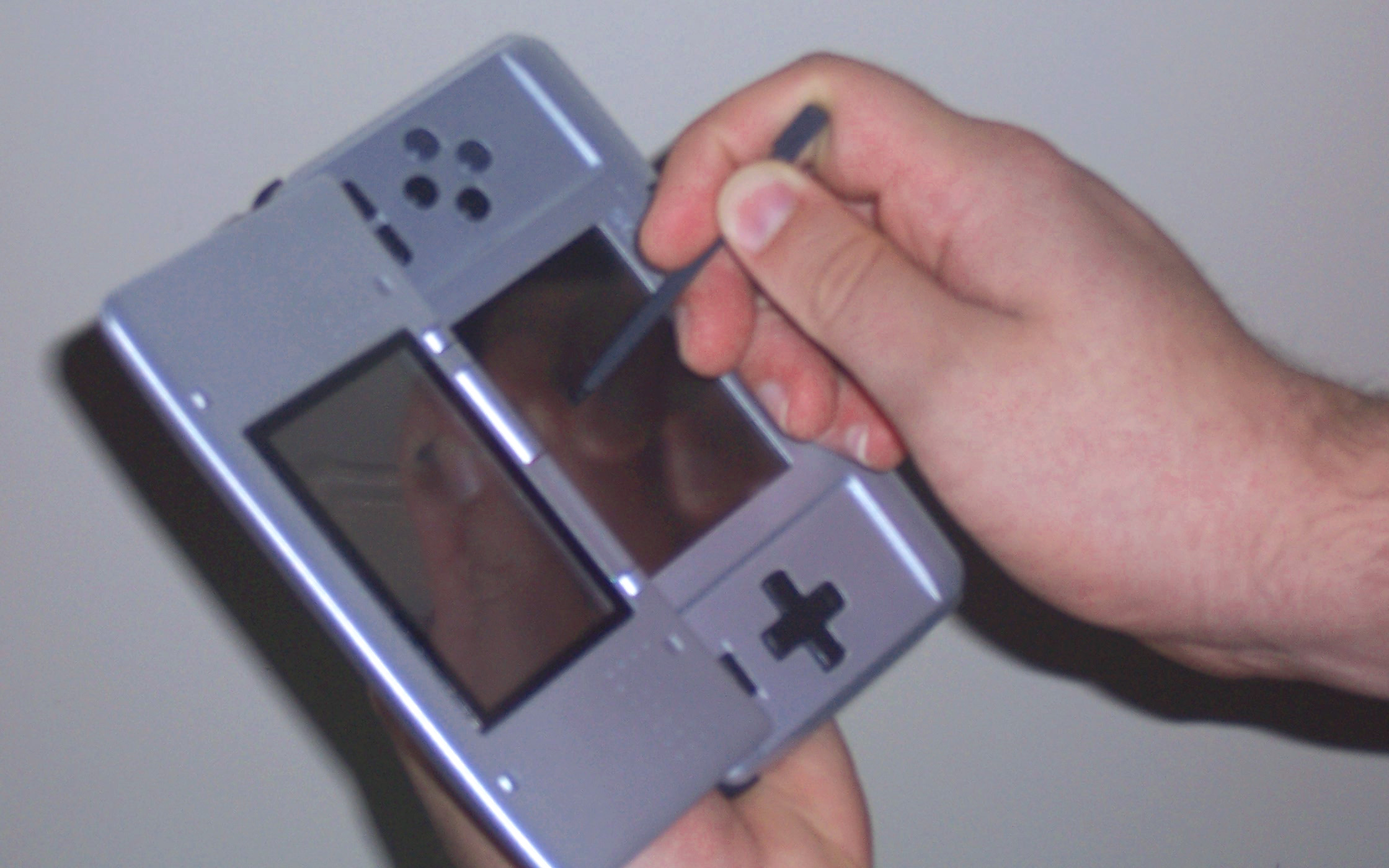
Brain Age 2 is played with the Nintendo DS held sideways.

Similar to its predecessor, Brain Age 2 is an edutainment video game that offers the player several minigames to play. Before the game begins, the player must create a profile, after which Brain Age Check runs three random tests to determine the player's brain age, which ranges from 20 to 80 and depends on the player's test performance. The brain age determines approximately the responsiveness of the player's brain; a brain age of 20, the lowest age that the player can achieve, indicates that the player's brain is as responsive as that of an average 20-year-old. Once the player is told their initial brain age, three modes are unlocked: Quick Play, Daily Training, and Sudoku. In Quick Play, the player can practice with any of the available minigames without receiving a score. In Daily Training, the player can perform Brain Age Check to determine their updated brain age. They can also complete one of the available minigames, after which they are given a rating based on their performance. To let the player track their progress, the game saves daily statistics of the player's performance, which are shown in a graph. In the third mode, Sudoku, the player can solve one of a hundred Sudoku puzzles.

All of the minigames in Brain Age 2 are different from those of the original Brain Age. Brain Age 2 contains six minigames in Brain Age Check:

- Rock, Paper, Scissors - Similar to the Stroop Test from the original, this minigame is played if the player answers "I can speak" when Professor Kawashima asks them if they can speak into the microphone. The player is given one of three hand shapes and an instruction to say the hand that will either win or lose against this hand (e.g. If the hand shows scissors and the instruction says "Please win", the player must say "Rock").
- Serial Subtraction - The player is given a starting number and must repeatedly subtract this number by the given number until it reaches the point where another subtraction would result in a negative number. The player must also memorize the last number as for every new number, it is quickly scribbled over.
- Symbol Match - The player is given a list of ten numbers from 0-9 along with a random symbol corresponding to each number. A number to the right of the list is shown, and the player must write the matching symbol.
- Math Recall - The player is shown a number, which is quickly scribbled as soon as the next number is shown. The aim is to add up the two numbers by writing the sum on the touch screen. When the player begins to write their answer, the second number is scribbled out as well. After each correct answer, one of the two numbers will be replaced with a different number.
- Number Memory - The player must memorize a grid of 25 numbers in two minutes. After the time is up, the player must select a square in the grid and write the number they saw in that place.
- High Number - The player is given several numbers, each displayed in different sizes. The aim is to touch the highest number.

The game's Training mode includes the following activities:

- Sign Finder - The player is given a series of math equations with an operator missing. The aim is to write the correct operator (+, -, *, or /) that makes the equation correct.
- Piano Player - The player is given a song to play on the piano and uses the touch screen to hit the keys as the music sheet progresses. There is also a Hard mode that hides the letters below the notes. The score is based on the accuracy of the player.
- Word Scramble - The player is presented several rotating letters and must spell out a word using all of those letters.
- Memory Sprint - The player must pay attention to the position of the dark racer as its runs in a race against the light racers. After the race is completed, the player writes the position that the dark racer finished in.
- Change Maker - The player is given the cost amount and the bills and coins to cover this amount. The aim is to give the correct amount of change by subtracting the purchase cost from the total amount of the bills and coins offered.
- Word Blend - The player must hear a word being said by a person and must recall what was said by writing the word. As the player progresses, more people are added, and the player must hear the words being said simultaneously. The player can skip a round if they are unable to write the words after five listens. Hard mode is also available.
- Calendar Count - The player is presented with a calendar problem (e.g. "What day of the week will it be 2 days after today?") and must write the correct day of the week or date.
- Math Recall - Same as the Brain Age Check version
- Clock Spin - The player is given an analog clock with only the number 12 visible that is rotated or inverted. The aim is to write the correct time as shown on the clock.
- Block Count - The player must memorize the blocks as they fall into the bucket. After all the blocks are placed in the bucket, the player must write the correct height of a given column.
- Virus Buster - A simplified version of Dr. Mario (1990) modified for mobile play. This minigame is unlocked after the player receives a stamp on the current day. Note that the background music for Virus Buster alternates every day between the "Chill" and "Fever" themes.

During their training, the player can collect stamps by completing minigames, and only one stamp can be collected per day. When a certain numbers of stamps are collected, new minigames and features are unlocked.

== Development ==
Brain Age 2 includes 100 Sudoku puzzles.

At a Nintendo press conference in Tokyo, Japan on October 5, 2005, the company announced several games that it would be releasing in 2006 in Japan. The list included Brain Age 2, with a release date set for December 29, 2005. Nintendo later announced that the game would be released in Europe on June 29, 2007, for €30, and in Australia on July 5, 2007, for A$49.95. The American version of Brain Age 2 was first revealed in May 2007. The game is targeted to casual gamers, similar to its predecessor; its basic concepts stay the same as in Brain Age, along with the graphics, menu, and presentation. Brain Age 2 also uses the same Sudoku engine, an addition in the original Brain Age that has been applauded for being one of the best handheld Sudoku games available; Brain Age 2's rendition of Sudoku introduces 100 new puzzles. All of the minigames in the game are new to the series; however, some of them are derived from exercises in Brain Age. One of the challenges in the first game, Head Count, requires that the player count how many people are shown on the screen; after a few seconds, a house falls on top of them, and then several people leave and enter the house. Afterward, the player must write down how many people they think are still in the house. A variation of this game is available in Brain Age 2, called Memory Sprint, which asks the player to observe a specific sprinter in a race as they pass other sprinters and are passed themselves, and then determine which place they finished in after they cross the finish line. The game's voice recognition technology has improved since the last game. The only challenge that uses the feature, Rock, Paper, Scissors, requires that the player speak the correct answer into the microphone as quickly as possible.

Nintendo's advertising campaign for Brain Age 2 featured several celebrities. The company announced on June 25, 2007, that Australian actress Nicole Kidman would appear in European television and newspaper advertisements to promote the game. Nintendo chose to feature her because of "her universal appeal to mainstream audiences of all ages and backgrounds, as well as her reputation for being intelligent, entertaining and genuine". Kidman praised Nintendo's desire to reach out to new audiences with self-improvement products, and found that playing the game made her feel young. Nintendo also chose professional swimmer Kieren Perkins to promote Brain Age 2 in his native Australia, who commented, "Having used the original Dr Kawashima's Brain Training game for a while now, I was genuinely looking forward to all of the new ways I could exercise my mind. More Brain Training is the perfect way for me to continue my Brain Training workout, while keeping the activities fresh and interesting." In the United States, print advertisements and television commercials for the game featured American actress Liv Tyler.

== Reception ==
Reception

Aggregate scores
Aggregator	Score
GameRankings	79.04%
Metacritic	77%

Review scores
Publication	Score
1Up.com	B+
Game Informer	8.25/10
GamePro	4/5
GameRevolution	B
GameSpy	4/5
GameZone	8.1/10
IGN	8.0/10
Nintendo World Report	7.0/10
X-Play	4/5
The Straits Times	8.5/10

Brain Age 2 was released by Nintendo for the Nintendo DS in Japan on December 29, 2005, in Europe on June 29, 2007, in Australia on July 5, 2007, and in North America on August 20, 2007. A Brain Age 2 Nintendo DS bundle was released in North America on August 21, 2007, which included a copy of Brain Age 2 and a Nintendo DS colored crimson on the top and matte black on the bottom. At a Nintendo Conference on October 2, 2008, Nintendo's president Satoru Iwata announced during his keynote address that both games in the Brain Age series were redeveloped as two DSiWare games called Small Brain DSi Training Everyday for Adults Literature Edition and Science Edition. The DSiWare iterations include training modes from the previous two Nintendo DS games, including new ones that take advantage of the Nintendo DSi's camera. Brain Age 2 was given generally favorable reviews, receiving aggregated scores of 77% from Metacritic and 79.04% from GameRankings. Praise focused on improvements made on Brain Age, while criticism targeted the game's inability to consistently understand written and spoken answers. The game was voted IGN's Reader's Game of the Month for August 2007.

Remarking that Brain Age 2 uses the same formula as Brain Age "with some different variables thrown in", Game Informer noted that players' opinions of the original Brain Age will most likely be similar to how much they appreciate Brain Age 2. GameZone was excited about the Sudoku portion of the game, which they complimented was "worth the entire game itself and will provide many hours of fun". They found the daily training and quick play modes "simply addictive", and appreciated the game's "simple and easy to use interface". The video game website IGN felt differently, however, noting that the challenges felt fresh, with the exception of Sudoku. IGN agreed with GameZone on a particular point, however, writing that both the original Brain Age, and Brain Age 2, have "calm, clean interface[s]". The television series X-Play was intrigued by Brain Age 2's promise to improve a person's intelligence. GameSpy called the game "the ideal video game gateway drug" because of its accessibility to a wide variety of people, lack of requirements for special physical dexterity or experience, and regular reward system to motivate the player. They also considered Brain Age 2 a "noble effort towards the betterment of our mental health through a painless training regimen". Game Revolution complimented the game's intelligent use of Nintendo DS features, "fun" sound effects, and "competent" handwriting recognition. Singapore's The Straits Times considered Brain Age 2 a good investment, despite noting that hardcore gamers might find the minigames "gimmicky". Recognizing that Nintendo intends to use the game to target baby boomers, The Globe and Mail writes that they were tempted to play the game at work and justify it as a self-improvement program.

Even though 1UP.com noticed slight improvements in Brain Age 2, they found that it also introduced new issues. They considered it difficult for the game to understand their writing, and were also displeased with what they perceived as an arrogant tone with Dr. Kawashima, the game's avatar. Disappointed with the lack of new additions to Brain Age 2, GamePro asked readers "[not to] expect too much more content than new tests and more Sudoku grids". Nintendo World Report was also unhappy with the game, telling players who were "hoping for an overhaul [...] to wait for the inevitable Brain Age 3". The Toronto Star reminded its readers that although Brain Age 2 bills itself as a game that is able to make players smarter, it actually means that "the word smart has been temporarily re-defined to mean 'good at playing Brain Age 2.'"

Brain Age 2 was the 13th best-selling game in its debut month of August 2007 in the United States, and climbed up to 9th place in September 2007, selling 141,000 copies. It was the 10th best-selling game for October 2007, selling 116,900 copies. The game reached 7th place in December 2007, then went down to 9th place in January 2008, and dropped further to 16th the following month. In August 2008, the game was the 13th best-selling game in the United States, and the 11th best-selling game in Canada. In Japan, the game was the best-selling game during its debut month of January 2005, selling 1,084,857 units. By March 2006, the game sold 1.7 million copies. For the week of May 15–21, 2006, the game was the 2nd best-selling game, with 62,000 units sold that week and 2,281,000 copies since its release. As of July 2006, Brain Age had sold 2,539,922 copies while Brain Age 2 had sold 2,752,211 copies in Japan, outselling its predecessor by more than 200,000 units. As of July 2007, 5.33 million copies of Brain Age 2 had been sold in Japan. The game received a "Diamond" sales award from the Entertainment and Leisure Software Publishers Association (ELSPA), indicating sales of at least 1 million copies in the United Kingdom. More than two-thirds of the people who purchased Brain Age 2 are over the age of 25. As of March 31, 2013, the game's worldwide sales have reached 14.88 million.

=== Effectiveness ===
A survey conducted by Alain Lieury, a professor of cognitive psychology at the University of Rennes 2 – Upper Brittany, indicates that working on exercises with a pencil and paper is just as good as Brain Age 2 at stimulating the memory. After evaluating ten-year-old children, the survey found "no evidence to support claims in Nintendo's advertising campaign, featuring Nicole Kidman, that users can test and rejuvenate their grey cells". Lieury finds Brain Age 2 acceptable as a game, but considers it charlatanism for Nintendo to claim it as a scientific test, countering the company's assertions that its edutainment products such as Big Brain Academy and Brain Age 2 can improve blood flow to the brain and supposedly improving "practical intelligence". Regarding whether or not brain training games are effective, Graham Lawton of New Scientist wrote, "All things considered, it's hard not to conclude that brain training has been proven to work—under certain circumstances. [...] It's also worth pointing out that no study has shown that brain training makes cognitive abilities any worse." Lawton notes that Nintendo avoids providing evidence that its Brain Age series actually leads to noticeable improvements in brain functions, and that it instead "is careful not to claim that Brain Age is scientifically validated, merely stating that it is an entertainment product 'inspired' by [Dr. Ryuta Kawashima's] work."

== See also ==
- Big Brain Academy
- Big Brain Academy: Wii Degree
- Brain Boost
- Brain Challenge
- Minna de Kitaeru Zenno Training
- Neurodegeneration
- Touch! Generations
