= Brain Boost =

- Genres: Puzzle, edutainment
- Developer: Interchannel
- Publisher: Majesco

Brain Boost, also known as The Professor's Brain Trainer in Australia and Europe, is a series of three brain-training games developed by Interchannel for the Nintendo DS handheld game console. Brain Boost was originally released in 2005 in Japan. Majesco published the first two games in the series in the United States on November 17, 2006, and the third game on January 22, 2008. Each game consists of five related mini-games.

== Games ==
- Brain Boost Beta Wave, subtitled "Improve your concentration", a.k.a. The Professor's Brain Trainer: Logic in Australia and Europe.
- Brain Boost Gamma Wave, subtitled "Improve your memory", a.k.a. The Professor's Brain Trainer: Memory in Australia and Europe.
- Mega Brain Boost, subtitled "Boost your brain power with 3 games-in-1". This game includes Brain Boost Beta Wave, Brain Boost Gamma Wave, and a new game.

== Critical reception ==
Brain Boost Beta Wave has a Metacritic score of 39% based on 12 critic reviews.

== See also ==
- Big Brain Academy
- Brain Age and Brain Age 2
- Brain Challenge
