= Hiroyuki Kimura =

Japanese video game producer (born 1965)

- 木村 浩之
- Born: June 1, 1965 (age 61); Ishikawa Prefecture, Japan
- Occupations: Video game director, producer and artist
- Employer: Nintendo (1988–present)
- Notable work: Super Mario; Metroid; Pikmin
- Title: Manager at Nintendo EAD (2003–2015); Manager at Nintendo EPD Production Group No. 10 (2015–present)

Hiroyuki Kimura (木村 浩之, Kimura Hiroyuki; born June 1, 1965) is a Japanese video game director and producer who works for Nintendo. Kimura joined the company as a trainee in 1988, and designed the characters of Super Mario Bros. 3. After that, he was originally assigned to Gunpei Yokoi and the Nintendo R&D1 team. Kimura designed a variety of games for Nintendo including several of the NES Zapper software and the Metroid series. Shortly after working on Super Metroid, Kimura was transferred to Shigeru Miyamoto and the Nintendo EAD group.

He is also the manager of Nintendo's Entertainment Planning & Development (EPD) Group No. 10, which oversees the Super Mario 2D games and the Pikmin franchise.

== Ludography ==
Year	Title	Role
1988	Super Mario Bros. 3	Character designer
1989	Golf	Designer
1991	Metroid II: Return of Samus	Director, graphic artist
1992	Super Mario Land 2: 6 Golden Coins	Testing player
1994	Super Metroid	Background artist
1995	Mario Clash	Director
1996	Wave Race 64	CG artist
2000	Mario Artist: Talent Studio	Director, designer
2001	Super Mario Advance	Art director
2001	Mario Kart: Super Circuit	Supervisor
2001	Super Mario Advance 2	Director
2002	Super Mario Advance 3	Director
2003	Super Mario Advance 4	Director
2005	Yoshi Touch & Go	Director
2005	Big Brain Academy	Producer
2006	New Super Mario Bros.	Producer
2007	Big Brain Academy: Wii Degree	Producer
2008	New Play Control: Pikmin	Producer
2009	New Play Control: Pikmin 2	Producer
2009	New Super Mario Bros. Wii	Producer
2012	New Super Mario Bros. 2	Co-producer
2012	New Super Mario Bros. U	Co-producer
2013	Pikmin 3	Producer
2015	Super Mario Maker	Co-producer
2016	Tank Troopers	Progress supervisor
2017	Mario Kart 8 Deluxe	Progress manager
2017	Arms	Production manager
2019	New Super Mario Bros. U Deluxe	Co-producer
2019	Super Mario Maker 2	Co-producer
2020	Pikmin 3 Deluxe	Project manager
2023	Pikmin 4	Project manager
2023	Super Mario Bros. Wonder	Production manager
