= Make 10: A Journey of Numbers =

2007 video game

- Developer: MuuMuu
- Publisher: Nintendo
- Platform: Nintendo DS
- Release: JP: October 10, 2007; AU: September 4, 2008; EU: September 26, 2008
- Genres: Educational, Puzzle
- Mode: Single-player

Make 10: A Journey of Numbers (タシテン たして10にする物語, Tashiten: Tashite 10 ni Suru Monogatari) is a puzzle and logic adventure game developed by MuuMuu and published by Nintendo for the Nintendo DS. Make 10 focuses on maths games, mostly revolving around adding or subtracting to make the number 10. It was released in Japan and PAL regions only, and was a Touch! Generations title in Australia.

== Plot ==
The game starts with the player character visiting a secluded village library and finding a book full of numbers. They become so bored that they nod off to sleep and wake up to find two pixies beside them. The pixies ask the character to reply to the question; "do we make ten?". Once the player character has replied to this question, the pixies transport them to Numberland, where they are tasked with finding the Make 10 Masters.

== Gameplay ==
In Make 10: A Journey of Numbers, the player travels around the Make 10 Kingdom and climbs the Trial Mountains. There are more than 30 minigames based around getting to the number 10, many of which use the Nintendo DS stylus. The stylus is also used to prod foliage and reveal different routes. The player is guided by Num Diddly, one of the Numberland pixies.
