= Sudoku Gridmaster =

2006 video game

- Developer(s): A.I
- Publisher(s): JP: Hudson Soft; WW: Nintendo
- Platform(s): Nintendo DS
- Release: JP: March 23, 2006; NA: June 26, 2006; EU: October 27, 2006; AU: February 22, 2007
- Genre(s): Puzzle
- Mode(s): Single-player

Sudoku Gridmaster (known as Puzzle Series Vol. 3: Sudoku in Japan and Sudoku Master in Europe) is a puzzle video game developed by A.I and published by Hudson Soft for the Nintendo DS. It was published by Nintendo outside Japan as part of the Touch! Generations series.

== Gameplay ==
The game features four hundred sudoku puzzles, four different tutorials as well as four difficulty settings (practice, easy, normal, and hard). If the player manages to perform well in the puzzle, they receive stars which can be used to take a sudoku test to determine their skill level. The game uses the Nintendo DS touch screen, which makes writing down and choosing different numbers easier.

It is a common misconception that this game has over 400 puzzles. The 'Rank Test' mode randomly chooses from the other puzzles. It is not randomly generated and it does not have its own set of puzzles.

== Development ==
Sudoku Gridmaster was the first full sudoku game for the Nintendo DS console.

== Reception ==
IGN's Craig Harris described the game as "good", but felt that Brain Age's sudoku minigame was better. He reported the graphics and music as decent and functional. Harris was confident that the game's 400 puzzles would last a long time.
