= Big Brain Academy: Wii Degree =

2007 video game

- North American box art
- Developer: Nintendo EAD
- Publisher: Nintendo
- Director: Tomoaki Yoshinobu
- Producer: Hiroyuki Kimura
- Designers: Akiko Hirono; Masanao Arimoto; Junji Morii
- Programmer: Yuzi Kando
- Composer: Ryō Nagamatsu
- Series: Big Brain Academy
- Platform: Wii
- Release: JP: April 26, 2007; NA: June 11, 2007; EU: July 20, 2007; AU: November 8, 2007
- Genres: Puzzle, edutainment
- Modes: Single player, Multiplayer

Big Brain Academy: Wii Degree, (Note: Known in Japan as Wii de Yawaraka Atama Juku (Wiiでやわらかあたま塾)) known in PAL regions as Big Brain Academy for Wii, is a video game released for the Wii. A sequel to the game Big Brain Academy for the Nintendo DS, it too claims to measure a player's brain's weight, but with new games and puzzles to solve. The game makes use of Miis and uses WiiConnect24 features, allowing competition amongst users' friends, whose codes are automatically imported from the Wii's internal address book.

A sequel, Big Brain Academy: Brain vs. Brain, was announced for Nintendo Switch on September 2, 2021, and was released on December 3, 2021.

== Gameplay ==
Big Brain Academy: Wii Degree includes a single-player mode whereby the player uses a brain to effectively solve puzzles. The game also includes a multiplayer mode, where the player can competitively train against other players. Big Brain Academy: Wii Degree makes use of the Wii Remote, allowing the player to point and click on-screen.

=== Minigames ===
There are 15 mini-games within Big Brain Academy: Wii Degree, divided into five categories:

- Identify (identification-themed puzzles)
  - Whack Match
  - Fast Focus
  - Species Spotlight
- Memorize (memory-themed puzzles)
  - Covered Cages
  - Face Case
  - Reverse Retention
- Analyze (reason-based puzzles)
  - Match Blast
  - Speed Sorting
  - Block Spot
- Compute (math-themed puzzles)
  - Balloon Burst
  - Mallet Math
  - Color Count
- Visualize (visual-themed puzzles)
  - Art Parts
  - Train Turn
  - Odd One Out

=== Solo mode ===
In this mode, the player is challenged with each of the 5 categories in random order. There are 12 questions per category (4 for each minigame), resulting in 60 puzzles in total. The player is scored based on speed and accuracy; the faster one solves a puzzle, the more "grams" they earn (which represents their score), but failing a puzzle scores no grams. The difficulty of the puzzles adjusts based on the player's score.

Each mini-game can be played separately, and depending on the results, the player can be awarded a medal, according to their score. There are 4 levels of difficulty: Easy, Medium, Hard, and Expert. The Expert level is not visible until gold or platinum medals are acquired on all of the previous 3. Platinum Medals can be earned in each of the difficulty levels (Easy, Medium, Hard, and Expert), but the score needed to do so differs in each level.

=== Multiplayer ===
Picture showing the mode Mind Sprint. The player on the left must identify the subject of the picture while the player on the right must pop the balloons in ascending order.

The 4 multiplayer modes in Big Brain Academy: Wii Degree allow the player to test their brain against up to 7 other players.

Mind Sprint allows 2 players to go head-to-head in a split-screened race, and up to 8 players can play as 2 teams. If a player fails a puzzle, they are stopped for about a second and have to redo the puzzle. One player or team can compete against player records (a computer opponent with skills based on that player's best test performance).

In Mental Marathon a team works together (or an individual works alone) to score as many points as possible within a time limit. Extra time is rewarded after each puzzle, based on the length of the next question; less time is awarded as the game goes on. One mistake ends the game. A maximum score of 100 is possible.

In Brain Quiz players take turns choosing from a selection of 12 categories. Each category has a difficulty attached to it, though this is hidden until the category is selected. When the player selects a category with a red ?, if the player is lucky the difficulty is medium with double points, if unlucky the difficulty is expert. During their turn, players must try to solve as many puzzles as possible within the time limit, but one mistake ends the turn. This mode is notable for having 5 extra games, one from each category, that do not appear elsewhere in the game. The 5 games only in this mode are Order Out (Memorize), True View (Visualize), Tick-Tock Turn (Compute), Pattern Puzzle (Analyze), and Frame Filler (Identify), for a total of 20 games.

In Academic Succession 2 teams of 2 are assembled. Each team starts with 1 player. Each team alternates turns deciding on the category for the next puzzle. The selected player from each team races to solve the puzzle. When a player solves the puzzle, they switch places with their teammate.

=== Online connectivity ===
Big Brain Academy: Wii Degree allows players to exchange Student Record Books with friends who also own the game, anywhere in the world, using Nintendo Wi-Fi Connection. A player's Student Record Book contains their latest Test result and details of the medals earned in-game. Players can compete against other players in a "Mind Sprint" mode, using each other's Student Record Books to work out how well each player would perform against each other and choose the mini-games to play accordingly.

== Reception ==
Reception

Aggregate score
Aggregator	Score
Metacritic	68/100

Review scores
Publication	Score
1Up.com	C+
Eurogamer	50%
Game Informer	7.5 out of 10
GamePro	4.5 out of 5
GameSpot	7.3 out of 10
GameTrailers	7.4 out of 10
Official Nintendo Magazine	72%

Gaming website IGN gave the game a score of 7.6 (out of 10), praising it for being "both easy to pick up and really fun to play, especially with friends", but criticizing it for being short and "shallow", and also for not including a proper online mode. GameSpot also scored the game positively, giving it a score of 7.3 out of 10. Conversely, they praised it for having a "decent number of different games and difficulties to choose from", and also for its use of Miis, while criticizing that many of the multiplayer modes require passing the controller around.

As of December 31, 2007, Big Brain Academy: Wii Degree has sold two million copies worldwide, with 380,000 of those copies being sold in Japan. It received a "Double Platinum" sales award from the Entertainment and Leisure Software Publishers Association (ELSPA), indicating sales of at least 600,000 copies in the United Kingdom. The game went on to sell 3.34 million copies worldwide as of 2022.

== See also ==
- List of Wii games
