= Brain Age: Train Your Brain in Minutes a Day! =

2005 puzzle video game

- North American box art
- Developer: Nintendo SPD
- Publisher: Nintendo
- Director: Kouichi Kawamoto
- Producer: Shinya Takahashi
- Programmers: Shinji Kitahara; Yoshinori Katsuki; Jun Ito
- Composers: Minako Hamano; Akito Nakatsuka
- Series: Brain Age
- Platform: Nintendo DS
- Release: JP: May 19, 2005; USA: April 16, 2006; CAN: April 17, 2006; EU: June 9, 2006; AU: June 16, 2006
- Genres: Puzzle, edutainment
- Modes: Single-player, multiplayer

Brain Age: Train Your Brain in Minutes a Day!, known as Dr Kawashima's Brain Training: How Old Is Your Brain? in the PAL regions, (Note: Known in Japan as Nō o Kitaeru Otona no DS Training (脳を鍛える大人のDSトレーニング, Nō o Kitaeru Otona no DS Torēningu; lit. "Train Your Brain: DS Training For Adults"), full title Tōhōku Daigaku Mirai Kagakugijutsu Kyōdōkenkyū Center Kawashima Ryūta Kyōju Kanshū: Nō o Kitaeru Otona no DS Training (Japanese: 東北大学未来科学技術共同研究センター川島隆太教授監修 脳を鍛える大人のDSトレーニング, Hepburn: Tōhōku Daigaku Mirai Kagakugijutsu Kyōdōkenkyū Sentā Kawashima Ryūta Kyōju Kanshū: Nō o Kitaeru Otona no Dī Esu Torēningu; lit. "Tohoku University Future Technology Research Center Professor and Supervisor Ryuta Kawashima's Train Your Brain: DS Training For Adults"), and known in South Korea as Daily DS Brain Training (매일매일 DS 두뇌 트레이닝)) is a 2005 edutainment puzzle video game by Nintendo for the Nintendo DS. It is inspired by the work of Japanese neuroscientist Ryuta Kawashima, who appears as a caricature of himself guiding the player.

Brain Age features a variety of puzzles, including Stroop tests, mathematical questions, and Sudoku puzzles, all designed to help keep certain parts of the brain active. It was released as part of the Touch! Generations series of video games, a series which features some games for a more casual gaming audience. Brain Age uses the touch screen and microphone for many of its puzzles. It has received both commercial and critical success, selling 19.01 million copies worldwide (as of September 30, 2015) and has received multiple awards for its quality and innovation. There has been controversy over the game's scientific effectiveness, as the game was intended to be played solely for entertainment. The game was later released on the Nintendo eShop for the Wii U in Japan in mid-2014.

It was followed by a sequel titled Brain Age 2: More Training in Minutes a Day!, and was later followed by two redesigns and Brain Age Express for the Nintendo DSi's DSiWare service which uses popular puzzles from these titles as well as several new puzzles, and Brain Age: Concentration Training for Nintendo 3DS. The latest installment in the series, Dr Kawashima's Brain Training for Nintendo Switch, for the Nintendo Switch, was first released in Japan on December 27, 2019.

== Gameplay ==
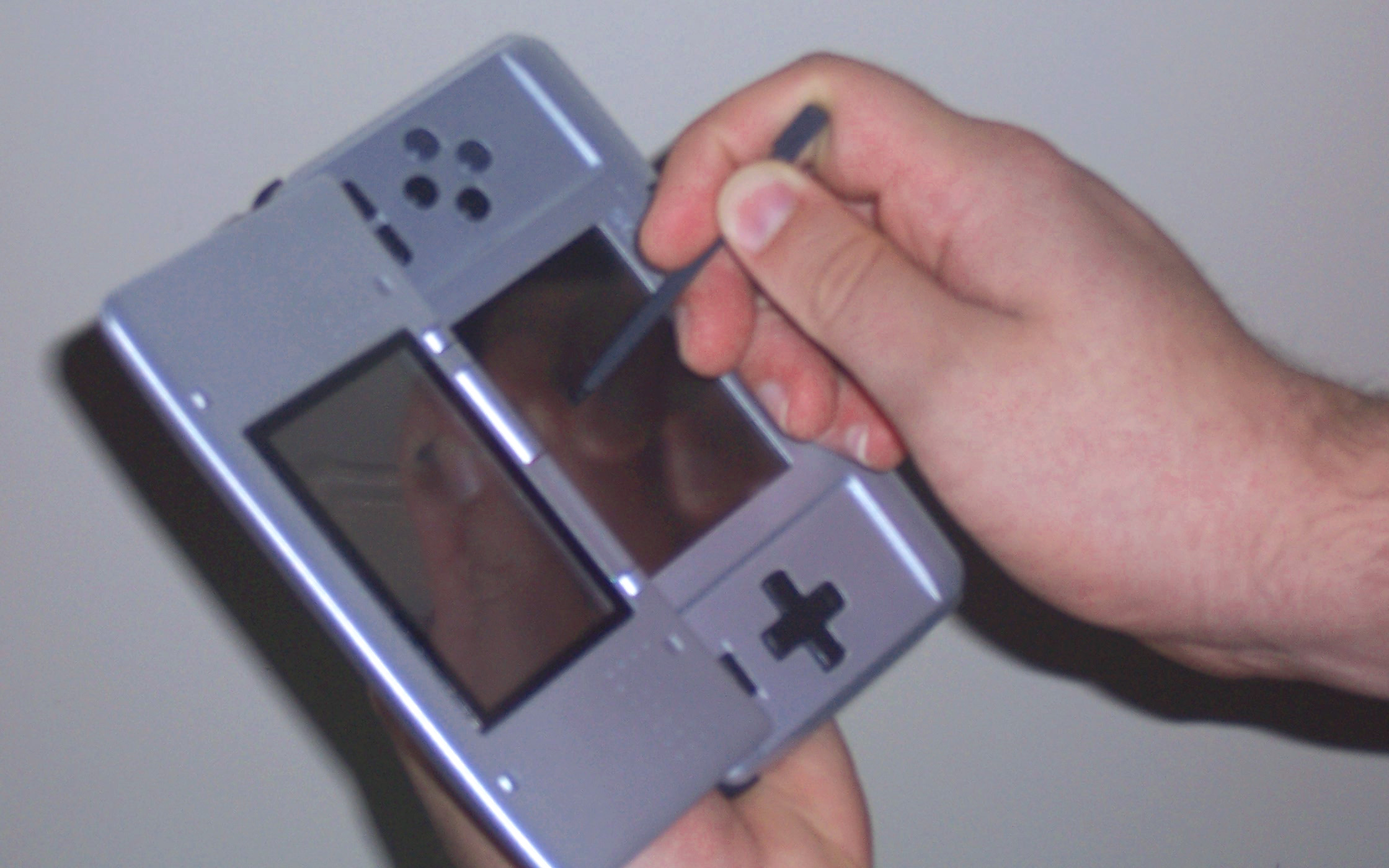
Brain Age is played with the Nintendo DS held sideways.

Brain Age is designed to be played a little each day, similar to the Nintendogs titles and Animal Crossing: Wild World. The game is played with the DS rotated 90 degrees like a book, with the touch screen on the right for right-handed people and the left for left-handed people. The game is entirely touch and voice-controlled – the player either writes the answer to the puzzle on the touch screen or speaks it into the microphone. Before the player can begin a Brain Age session, they must input information. First, players must confirm the date and select which hand they write with. The player then inputs their name and date of birth.

At the end of all Brain Age Check puzzles, Training puzzles, Quick Play puzzles, and Sudoku puzzles, the player is shown how quickly they completed it, the player's speed (according to metaphors such as "bicycle speed" and "jet speed", the highest being "rocket speed"), and a tip for either improving the player's brain or a game-related tip. If the player's time or score in Brain Age Check or Training is high enough, it will appear on one or both of the Top Three. The Top Three shown is the player's own top three attempts at a puzzle, while they can also compare the top three with those of other saved players. The player's score is only counted on their first attempt at a puzzle each day.

The player is also awarded stamps for each day they complete the puzzles. When enough is accumulated, the game unlocks certain features such as more puzzles in Training mode, Hard versions of these puzzles, and the ability to customize the player's own stamps.

While the player is navigating the menus outside of the puzzles, Professor Kawashima appears to prompt and encourage the user. Brain Age allows up to four players to save profiles on one DS game card, and these players can interact with each other in several different ways. There are five modes of play – Brain Age Check, Training, Quick Play, Download, and Sudoku.

When starting a session, Kawashima may ask the player to participate in a Picture-Drawing Quiz, which requires the player to draw a person, place, or thing by memory using the touch screen. After the player has done all three, the game will compare their drawing to an example created by the game developers, along with advice of what to emphasize on below its image. If more than one player profile is saved on the game card, images for the day can be compared to those of other players.

Kawashima may also ask the player to participate in a Memory Quiz, which requires the player to recall a recent event, such as what the player ate or the most interesting thing seen on television the day before. Several days later, it will ask for the answer originally provided, and will then compare the answer given several days ago and the answer given on the current day to test the player's recollection skills. The player is not scored on their ability to remember.

=== Brain Age Check ===
The game includes four modes: Brain Age Check, Training, Quick Play, and Sudoku. The Brain Age Check gives the player three puzzle minigames to complete. The first is usually a Stroop test, although the player can choose to skip the Stroop test if they are not in a quiet environment or is otherwise unable to speak into the microphone. At the end of the Brain Age Check, the game reports on the player's "brain age", a theoretical assessment of the age of the player's brain. The higher the brain age, the worse the player performed. The best possible score is 20 and the worst 80, according with Kawashima's theory that the brain stops developing at 20. The player may replay the Brain Age Check, but the brain age is registered per day only.

Once the player confirms whether or not they can speak into the microphone, Professor Kawashima will describe the first puzzle. If the player answered that they can speak, the game begins with a Stroop test; if the player cannot use the microphone, the game picks a random puzzle from the following: Calculations X 20, Word Memory, Connect Maze, and Number Cruncher.

During the Stroop Test, the game will display one of four words and colors: blue, black, yellow, and red. One of these words mentioned will appear on screen, in a random color which may not match the color denoted by the word. The player is instructed to say the color of the word, rather than the word itself (e.g., if the word Yellow appears in blue letters, the correct answer is "blue" according to the Stroop effect for details).

In Speed Counting, which requires speaking but does not use the microphone, the player counts up from one to 120 as fast as they can without slurring the names of numbers.

Word Memory gives the player a list of 30 four-lettered words. The player is given two minutes to study the list and memorize as many words as possible. After the time is up, the player must write down as many words as they can in three minutes. To spell words that were not on the list won't make the player lose marks but the system won't recognize them. On the contrary, spelling an on-list word will count as memorized and even the test will notify the players if they already wrote this word in case they rewrite it.

Connect Maze gives players a randomly created group of circles, with letters and numbers in them. The player must follow the pattern A-1-B-2 until reaching M-13 as quickly as possible.

Calculations × 20 presents the player with 20 simple calculation equations that includes addition, subtraction, and multiplication. On the top screen are the problems which scroll up as answered whether right or wrong, while the touch screen is used to write out the answer. This test is also available in the training section.

Number Cruncher is a mental agility game that displays several numbers, which vary in their appearance and on-screen behavior and above it is a question, such as "how many numbers are blue?" or "how many numbers are moving?", which the player must answer as quickly as possible.

=== Training ===
The Training mode allows the player to play a variety of training programs, with all but one of them being exclusive to the Training mode. Once the player completes at least one program, Kawashima awards them with a stamp, which he places on the current date. If the player completes at least three programs, the stamp will expand in size. After accumulating a certain number of stamps, Kawashima will award the player with a new program, difficulty mode, or additional feature under the Options menu such as the ability for the player to customize their own stamp. Each program can be played as many times as the player likes, although only the first play-through of the day will count in the graph for that puzzle.

==== Minigames ====
There are nine training programs in Training mode. The first three are available by default, while the rest are unlocked by collecting enough stamps.

1. Calculations × 20, which is the same as the one found in the Brain Age Check. Mental agility exercise with a total of simple calculation 20 questions that includes addition, subtraction, and multiplication.
2. Calculations × 100, which is the same as Calculations × 20, although with 100 questions instead of 20. There is a hard mode that includes simple division.
3. Reading Aloud, which gives the player an excerpt from a classic story such as The Legend of Sleepy Hollow or Little Women, and tasks the player with reading the story aloud or mute to see how quickly they can do it. The player progresses through the excerpt by pushing Next, until they reach the end of the excerpt. If the player pushes Next too quickly, this will be found as cheating, and the program will count the activity as undone.
4. Low to High: The game instructs to remember several numbers in boxes; those boxes appear with no numbers but at the count of 3, numbers appear only one second. Once gone, the players have to remember the numbers from the lowest to the highest and click the correct box, while failing to order the numbers will count as mistake. Depending on if the player gets right or wrong the number of boxes increase or decrease, meaning that the game has an adaptive difficulty between at least 4 boxes to a maximum of 16.
5. Syllable Count shows several phrases, one after the other, on the top screen, and the player must write the number of syllables in each phrase on the touch screen.
6. Head Count features a random number of people on the top screen (e.g. 4). After a few seconds to allow the player to count the number of people, a house falls over them. The player must watch the screen carefully, as the people inside will leave the house and more people will enter the house. This will eventually cease, and the game asks the player to write down how many people are currently in the house. The puzzle gets more difficult as the player progresses in it. There is also a hard mode in which people also come in and out of the chimney.
7. Triangle Math: A kind of calculations (most of the time addition or subtraction, but sometimes may include sign rules such as -(-3)= 3) in tier format just like Pascal's triangle that the player must solve. This exercise also features a hard mode with an additional tier.
8. Time Lapse displays two analogue clocks (e.g. one at 2:45 and one at 7:30), and requires the player to calculate the difference in time between those clocks, in that case answer would be 4h 45min.
9. Voice Calculation, which is similar to the Calculations puzzles. However, this puzzle requires the player to speak the correct answer loud just like the Stroop Test.

=== Quick Play ===
Quick Play can be played by anyone, whether they have a saved file or not. Quick Play allows the player to play three modes – Quick Brain Age Check, Quick Training, and Quick Sudoku, all only providing the player with one of the easy puzzles in each of these modes to try. Quick Brain Age Check only allows the player to play the stroop test. In Quick Training, the game only allows the player to play Calculations × 20. In Quick Sudoku, which is only available for North America, Europe and South Korea, the player may only play the easiest Sudoku puzzle available. At the end of each session, the player's brain age or time will be assessed, and Kawashima will give a preview of the full game.

=== Download ===
A player with a copy of Brain Age can send certain game data to other Nintendo DS consoles using the DS Download Play feature. They may either download Quick Play mode to this player's Nintendo DS, or Calculations × 30, a variation of the other Calculation puzzles which can be played by up to sixteen people. This mode is not supported in the Wii U Virtual Console version.

=== Sudoku ===
Included in the North America, Europe, Australia and Korea versions of this game is a Sudoku mode, which features more than 100 puzzles across three different modes – Beginner, Intermediate, and Advanced. Sudoku involves a 9×9 grid with numbers in every square. Some of these numbers are visible, while others are not. The objective is to fill in the hidden numbers using the visible numbers as hints. Each row, column, and 3×3 grid has nine squares in it, and each must contain each number in the range from 1 to 9.

== Scientific effectiveness ==
Many neurologists recommend the game for prevention of dementia or Alzheimer's disease. Nintendo of America has refused to support any scientific claims to the benefits of the game, stressing that they are in the entertainment business.

One study involved 600 Scottish students with one group of students who played twenty minutes of "Brain Age" before class daily for nine weeks and a control group that studied regularly. The students were tested at the beginning and end of the study. In the end, the group that played Brain Age improved test scores by 50%. The time to complete the tests in the Brain Age group dropped by five minutes, and this improvement doubled that of the control group.

Another study involving 67 ten-year-olds found no evidence to support claims that Brain Age improves cognitive function better than other means of training one's brain. However, the game states that the best indications of brain age are when the user is at least twenty years of age. Professor of cognitive psychology Alain Lieury at the University of Rennes, France said: "The Nintendo DS is a technological jewel. As a game it's fine. But it is charlatanism to claim that it is a scientific test". Helping children with homework, reading, playing Scrabble or Sudoku, or watching documentaries, matched or beat the benefits of Brain Age. The children were split into four groups. The first two completed a seven-week memory course on a Nintendo DS, the third did puzzles with pencils and paper, and the fourth went to school as normal. Researchers found that children playing Brain Age failed to show any significant improvement in memory tests. They did do 19% better in mathematics but so did the pencil-and-paper group, and the fourth group did 18% better. In memorization, the pencil-and-paper group had a 33% improvement, while the Brain Age group performed 17% worse. In logic tests, the Brain Age group had a 10% improvement as did the pencil-and-paper group. The children who had no training improved 20%.

It has also been stated that the same effects of "keeping the brain sharp" can be achieved by either playing Sudoku, Tetris or talking with friends.

A study conducted between March and August 2010 in Sendai city, Miyagi prefecture, Japan, assessed the impact of the brain training game on the elderly, using a double blinded intervention. Results showed that playing Brain Age for 4 weeks could lead to improved cognitive functions (executive functions and processing speed) in the elderly.

In a review examining cognitive training programs, a research team led by Daniel J. Simmons found that Nintendo do not cite any scientific literature when describing the touted benefits of Brain Age and its sequels, and that experimental attempts at verifying Kawashima's claims provided mixed results with small effect sizes.

== Development ==
Nintendo was looking for something new to develop that would appeal to both traditional and casual gamers. In one of the meetings, the Chief Financial Officer of Nintendo's Japanese division suggested reviewing a published book titled Train Your Brain: 60 Days to a Better Brain, which was enjoying a great deal of success in Japan. Satoru Iwata, the president of Nintendo, arranged for a meeting with Professor Ryuta Kawashima, the author of the book.

As both Iwata and Professor Kawashima were too busy to meet under normal circumstances, they both agreed to meet for an hour during the Nintendo DS launch. The original meeting became a brainstorming session that lasted for three hours, in which Professor Kawashima explained the basics of his studies. Iwata assigned a team of nine developers to develop the game and to have it ready in 90 days for demonstration.

Brain Age's sound director was Masami Yone, while the music was composed by Minako Hamano and Akito Nakatsuka, both having composed music for Nintendo games as early as 1993 and 1987 respectively. The main menu song from this game was later used in Super Smash Bros. Brawl.

== Reception ==
=== Critical response ===
Reception

Aggregate scores
Aggregator	Score
GameRankings	78.1%
Metacritic	77 out of 100

Review scores
Publication	Score
1Up.com	A−
GameSpot	7.2 of 10
GameSpy	3.5 out of 5
IGN	8 of 10

The game was received with generally positive reviews in the Western market, though some criticized the game for poor voice and handwriting recognition at times. The game's design earned it Edge magazine's EIEF06 Edge Award for innovation. In 2007, during the 10th Annual Interactive Achievement Awards, the Academy of Interactive Arts & Sciences awarded Brain Age with "Handheld Game of the Year", along with nominations for "Family Game of the Year", "Outstanding Innovation in Gaming", and "Outstanding Achievement in Game Design". The game has also been featured in numerous media apparitions including newspapers and television in different countries, including the United States (Time magazine and Discovery Channel) and Australia (featured in Seven News). Wired included the game in its list of "The 15 Most Influential Games of the Decade" at No. 5, due to how it "bucked the dominant trends" and "ushered in the era of games that are (supposedly) good for you, like Wii Fit".

=== Sales ===
The initial reaction from retailers was that of concern about the new title's ability to sell. The most important retailers in Japan were given the game for 15 minutes to test it out. In the end, Nintendo secured nearly 70,000 orders for the first shipment, an amount above most expectations. In comparison, the sequel had over 850,000 orders placed before its launch.

Brain Age met with positive sales figures. The game debuted selling around 43,000 copies in May 2005, considered a good number for an educational title. Although most titles only stay in the Japanese weekly top ten list of games for a couple of weeks, Brain Age managed to stay, as of January 2006, between the most sold games for 34 weeks (except three weeks). As of June 11, 2006, Brain Age has sold 2,322,970 copies in Japan alone. It was the 94th best-selling game in Japan in 2008, selling 140,992 copies, with total lifetime sales of 3,750,890. During its first three weeks on sale in North America, Brain Age sold 120,000 copies, becoming the fifteenth title in the top U.S. video game charts during the month of May in terms of units sold. In Europe, Brain Age received critical acclaim, becoming number 1 in the Nintendo DS sales chart, and number 4 in the all-platforms chart on debut, and selling more than 500,000 units in just over two months. As of January 22, 2007, Brain Age has sold over 2 million copies in Europe. As of October 30, 2007, Brain Age has sold over one million copies in the United Kingdom. It was the 10th best-selling Nintendo DS game of December 2008 in the United States. As of September 30, 2015, Brain Age has worldwide sales of 19.01 million.

=== International release ===
The positive sales figures and overall reception in Japan led to Brain Age being released in various countries around the world. In the North American market, the game is known as Brain Age: Train Your Brain in Minutes a Day and was released on April 17, 2006, and included 108 Sudoku puzzles of different levels of difficulty. Nintendo gave out copies of the North American version of Brain Age at the 2006 Game Developers Conference. They also shipped free retail versions to special members of the Nintendo NSider Forums. Both groups received their copies before the official release date. It has also been given away to certain retailers with the purchase of a Nintendo DS Lite.

The game was released as Dr Kawashima's Brain Training: How Old Is Your Brain? in the UK, Australia and Ireland. Like the American version, this version also features Sudoku. All 3 parts are saved on one cartridge. In the UK, its initial television commercials featured Chris Tarrant. Nicole Kidman, Ronan Keating, and Patrick Stewart feature in current European commercials for the Brain Age series.

Nintendo Australia featured an ad campaign that coincided with its Australian release. During the period of June 15 to July 17, 2006, Nintendo Australia stated that for every copy of Brain Age purchased, Nintendo would donate $1.00 to Alzheimer's Australia.

The game was one of the launch titles for the DS Lite in South Korea, along with English Training: Have Fun Improving Your Skills!. It was released on January 18, 2007.

== See also ==
- Brain Age 2: More Training in Minutes a Day!
- Big Brain Academy and Big Brain Academy: Wii Degree
- Brain Boost
- Brain Challenge
- Minna de Kitaeru Zenno Training
- Touch! Generations
- Neurodegeneration
- Brain fitness
