= Nintendo Entertainment Analysis & Development =

Former division of Nintendo

Nintendo Entertainment Analysis & Development Division

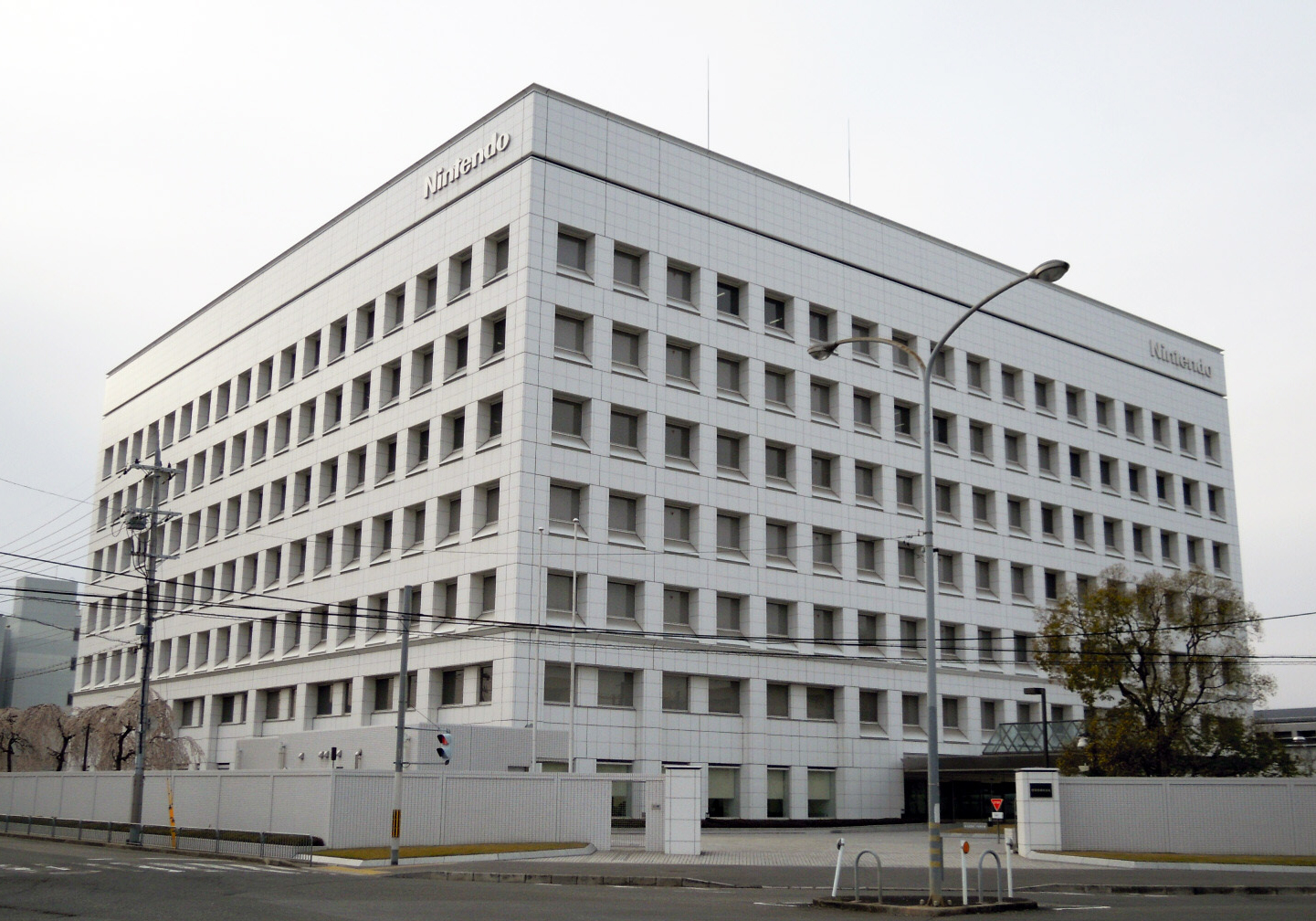
- Exterior of the Nintendo Central Office in Kyoto, where the division was housed for most of its existence
- Native name: 任天堂情報開発本部
- Romanized name: Nintendō Jōhō Kaihatsu Honbu
- Formerly: Nintendo Research & Development No.4 Department
- Type: Division
- Industry: Video games
- Predecessors: Nintendo R&D1; Nintendo R&D2
- Founded: September 30, 1983; 43 years ago
- Founder: Hiroshi Yamauchi
- Defunct: September 16, 2015; 11 years ago
- Fate: Merged with Nintendo Software Planning & Development
- Successor: Nintendo Entertainment Planning & Development
- Headquarters: Kyoto, Japan
- Number of locations: 2 (Kyoto and Tokyo)
- Key people: Hiroshi Ikeda (Note: Former General Manager); Shigeru Miyamoto; Takashi Tezuka (Note: General Manager); Katsuya Eguchi (Note: Deputy General Manager); Yoshiaki Koizumi; Hideki Konno (Note: Group Manager); Eiji Aonuma
- Services: Video game development
- Parent: Nintendo

Nintendo Entertainment Analysis & Development Division, (Note: Japanese: 任天堂情報開発本部, Hepburn: Nintendō Jōhō Kaihatsu Honbu) commonly abbreviated as Nintendo EAD and formerly known as Nintendo Research & Development No.4 Department (Note: Known in Japan as Nintendō Kaihatsu Daiyon Bu (任天堂開発第四発)) (abbreviated as Nintendo R&D4), was the largest software development division within the Japanese video game company Nintendo.

It was preceded by the Creative Department, a team of designers with backgrounds in art responsible for many different tasks, to which Shigeru Miyamoto and Takashi Tezuka originally belonged. Both served as managers of the EARD studios and were credited in every game developed by the division, with varying degrees of involvement. Nintendo EAD was best known for its work on games in the Donkey Kong, Mario, The Legend of Zelda, F-Zero, Star Fox, Animal Crossing, Pikmin, and Wii series.

Following a large company restructuring after the death of company president Satoru Iwata, the division merged with Nintendo's Software Planning & Development division in September 2015, becoming Nintendo Entertainment Planning & Development.

== History ==
=== Background ===
During the 1970s, when Nintendo was still predominantly a toy company, it decided to expand into interactive entertainment and the video game industry. Several designers were hired to work under the Creative Department, which, at the time, was the only game development department within Nintendo. Among these new designers were Makoto Kano, who went on to design various Game & Watch games, and Shigeru Miyamoto, who would create various Nintendo franchises. In 1972, the department was renamed to Research & Development Department; it had about 20 employees. The department was later consolidated into a division and separated into three groups, Nintendo R&D1, R&D2 and R&D3.

=== 1980–1989: Creation as Research & Development 4 ===
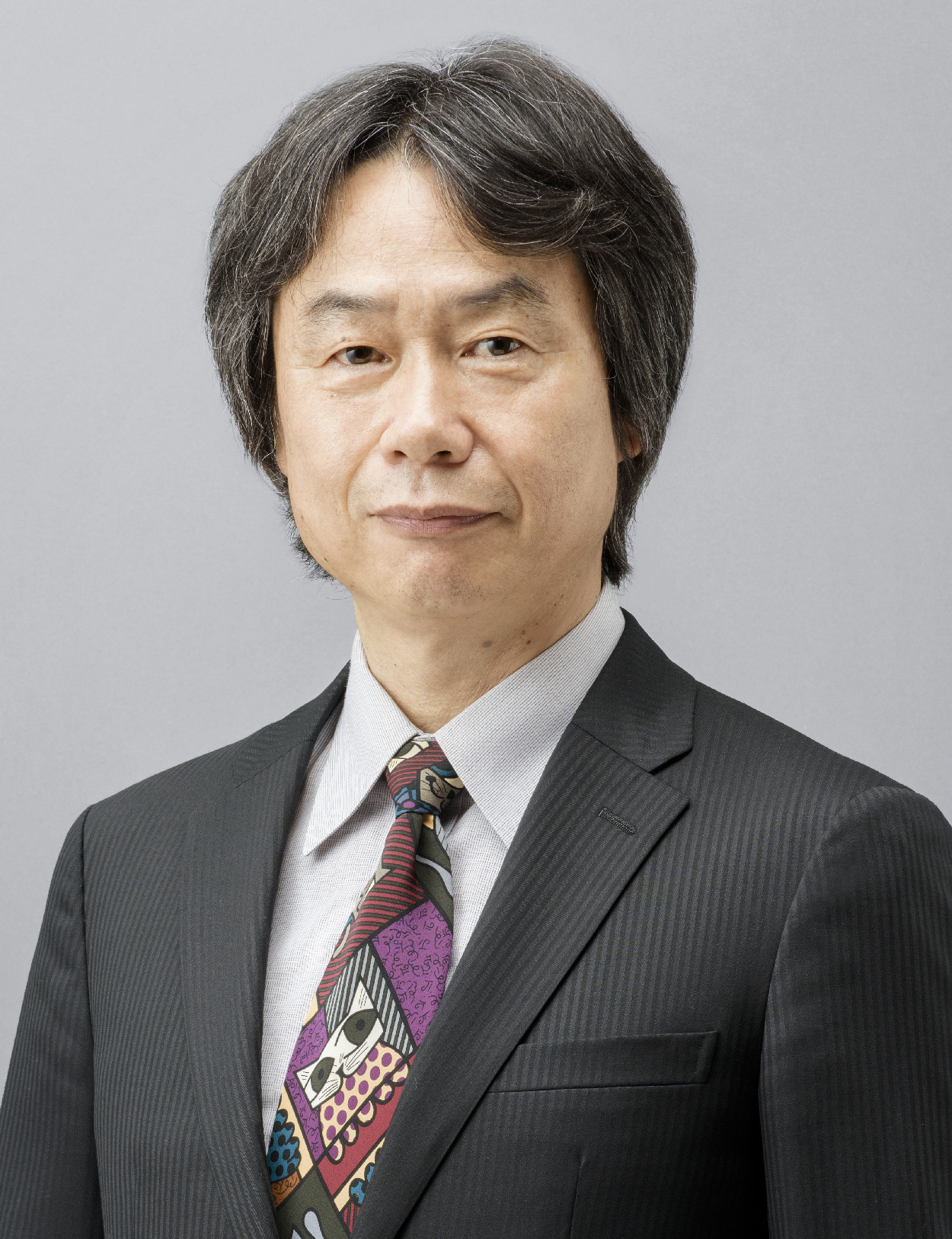
The success of Shigeru Miyamoto's Donkey Kong arcade game was a deciding factor in the creation of Nintendo R&D4.

Circa 1983, Hiroshi Imanishi oversaw the creation of Research & Development No. 4 Department (commonly abbreviated to Nintendo R&D4), as a new development department dedicated to developing video games for home consoles, complementing the other three existing departments in the Nintendo Manufacturing Division. Imanishi appointed Hiroshi Ikeda, a former director at Toei Animation, as general manager of the newly created department, and Miyamoto as its chief producer. Also hired were Takashi Tezuka and Kenji Miki, graphic designers, Minoru Maeda, a designer, and Koji Kondo, Akito Nakatsuka, and Hirokazu Tanaka, all sound designers.

Ikeda's creative team had many ideas, but lacked the programming skills to put them into action. Mario Bros., one of the unit's first games, required assistance in this regard from Gunpei Yokoi and R&D1. Toshihiko Nakago was familiar with the chipset for the Family Computer, Nintendo's contemporary home console, as he was originally hired to work with Masayuki Uemura's Nintendo R&D2 to develop software development kits for Nintendo consoles. When R&D2 and Systems Research and Development, Nakago's company, began porting R&D1-developed arcade games to the Famicom, Shigeru Miyamoto lured him and SRD to R&D4 to help develop Excitebike.

Following the release of Excitebike, R&D4 developed a Famicom port of the beat 'em up arcade game Kung-Fu Master, called Spartan X in Japan and Kung Fu everywhere else. The game improved on features introduced in Donkey Kong, representing a key step in the life of the platform game genre. Their next game was Super Mario Bros., a self-developed sequel to Mario Bros. The game standardized many aspects of the platform genre, and went on to be a critical and commercial success. Developed concurrently, but released a year later, was The Legend of Zelda, an action adventure game. The phenomenal sales of Mario and Zelda made Miyamoto a household name, and allowed the department to expand. Hideki Konno, Katsuya Eguchi, Kensuke Tanabe, and Takao Shimizu were all hired at this time, and they would become producers themselves.

=== 1989–2003: Renamed to Entertainment Analysis & Development ===
In 1989, one year before the Super Famicom was released in Japan, the R&D4 department was spun-off and made its own division named Nintendo Entertainment Analysis & Development (commonly abbreviated as Nintendo EAD). The division was comprised into two departments: the Software Development Department, which focused on video game development and was led by Miyamoto, and the Technology Development Department, which focused on programming and developing tools and was led by Takao Sawano. The technology department relied on R&D2 engineers who assisted SRD with software libraries. Following the release of F-Zero, the first video game fully programmed by EAD, they collaborated with Argonaut Software to develop the Super FX, a chip which, when placed in Super Famicom cartridges, enabled the use of 3D graphics. As 3D gaming became more prominent, so, too, did the department, programming several of Nintendo EAD's 3D games with SRD.

In 1997, Miyamoto explained that about twenty to thirty employees were devoted to each Nintendo EAD title during the course of its development, and that SRD was a company within the division, formally Nintendo R&D2's software unit, and was composed of about 200 programmers.

In June 2000, in an attempt to include software experts, Nintendo's board of directors invited Miyamoto to join; he also gained responsibility for all of Nintendo's software development, though he would produce further games with EAD.

In 2002, to acquire talent from Tokyo who were hesitant to move to Kyoto, Nintendo opened a branch of EAD, appointing Takao Shimizu as manager. Their first project was Donkey Kong Jungle Beat, a GameCube game which made use of the DK Bongos introduced in Donkey Konga.

=== 2004–2015: Restructure, new managers, and merger with SPD ===
In 2004, as a result of a restructuring at Nintendo, several employees at R&D1 and R&D2 were reassigned to EAD, and the department was consolidated into a division, welcoming a new class of managers and producers. Tezuka became deputy general manager, and Eiji Aonuma, Konno, Shimizu, Tadashi Sugiyama, and Katsuya Eguchi became producers overseeing their own development teams. Keizo Ota and Yasunari Nishida were appointed project managers of their own groups in the Technology Development Department.

In 2013, Eguchi was promoted to Department Manager of both Software Development Departments in Kyoto and Tokyo. As such, he left his role as Group Manager of Software Development Group No. 2, and was replaced by Hisashi Nogami. On June 18, 2014, the EAD Kyoto branch was moved from the Nintendo Central Office to the Nintendo Development Center in Kyoto. The building housed more than 1100 developers from all of Nintendo's internal research and development divisions, which included the Nintendo EAD, SPD, IRD and SDD divisions.

On September 16, 2015, during a restructuring overshadowed by the recent death of president Satoru Iwata, EAD merged with Nintendo Software Planning & Development, forming Entertainment Planning & Development (EPD).

== Structure ==
The Nintendo Entertainment Analysis & Development division was headed by Nintendo-veteran Takashi Tezuka who acted as general manager. The division was divided in two development departments: one in Kyoto, with Katsuya Eguchi acting as its deputy general manager; and one in Tokyo, with Yoshiaki Koizumi acting as its deputy general manager.

=== Kyoto Software Development Department ===
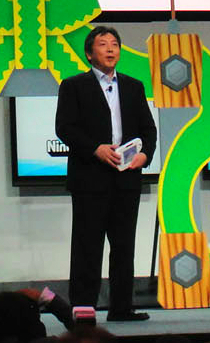
Katsuya Eguchi, Deputy General Manager of the Nintendo EAD division in Kyoto

The Nintendo EAD Kyoto Software Development Department was the largest and one of the oldest research and development departments within Nintendo, housing more than 700 video game developers. It was located in Kyoto, Japan, formerly in the Nintendo Central Office, but on June 28, 2014, it was relocated to the new Nintendo Development Center, which housed all of Nintendo's internal research and development divisions.

The development department integrated Nintendo's most notable producers: Hideki Konno, producer of the Nintendogs and Mario Kart series; Katsuya Eguchi, producer of the Wii and Animal Crossing series; Eiji Aonuma, producer of The Legend of Zelda series; Hiroyuki Kimura, producer of the Big Brain Academy, Super Mario Bros., and Pikmin series; and Tadashi Sugiyama, producer of the Wii Fit, Steel Diver and Star Fox series.

The department was managed by veteran Nintendo game designer Katsuya Eguchi. As such, Hisashi Nogami later succeeded him as the producer of the Animal Crossing franchise and was responsible for the creation of the Splatoon series.

List of video games developed by the Nintendo EAD Software Development Department in Kyoto
| Year | Title | Genre(s) | Platform(s) | Producer(s) | Ref. |
|---|---|---|---|---|---|
| 1984 | Excitebike | Racing | Nintendo Entertainment System | Shigeru Miyamoto | |
| 1985 | Kung-Fu | Beat 'em up | Nintendo Entertainment System | Shigeru Miyamoto | |
| 1985 | Super Mario Bros. | Platform | Nintendo Entertainment System | Shigeru Miyamoto | |
| 1986 | The Legend of Zelda | Action-adventure | Family Computer Disk System; Nintendo Entertainment System | Shigeru Miyamoto | |
| 1986 | The Mysterious Murasame Castle | Action-adventure | Family Computer Disk System | Keizo Kato | |
| 1986 | Super Mario Bros. 2 | Platform | Family Computer Disk System | Shigeru Miyamoto | |
| 1987 | Zelda II: The Adventure of Link | Action role-playing | Family Computer Disk System; Nintendo Entertainment System | Shigeru Miyamoto | |
| 1987 | Yume Kōjō: Doki Doki Panic | Platform | Family Computer Disk System | Shigeru Miyamoto | |
| 1987 | Famicom Mukashibanashi: Shin Onigashima (Note: Co-developed with Pax Softnica) | Adventure, visual novel | Family Computer Disk System | Hiroshi Ikeda; Shigeru Miyamoto | |
| 1987 | Famicom Grand Prix: F-1 Race | Racing | Family Computer Disk System | Shigeru Miyamoto | |
| 1988 | Famicom Grand Prix II: 3D Hot Rally (Note: Co-developed with HAL Laboratory) | Racing | Family Computer Disk System | Shigeru Miyamoto | |
| 1988 | Ice Hockey | Sports | Family Computer Disk System; Nintendo Entertainment System | Shigeru Miyamoto; Masayuki Uemura | |
| 1988 | Super Mario Bros. 3 | Platform | Nintendo Entertainment System | Shigeru Miyamoto | |
| 1989 | Famicom Mukashibanashi: Yūyūki | Adventure, visual novel | Family Computer Disk System | Shigeru Miyamoto | |
| 1990 | Super Mario World | Platform | Super Nintendo Entertainment System | Shigeru Miyamoto | |
| 1990 | F-Zero | Racing | Super Nintendo Entertainment System | Shigeru Miyamoto | |
| 1990 | Pilotwings | Amateur flight simulation | Super Nintendo Entertainment System | Shigeru Miyamoto | |
| 1991 | SimCity | City-building | Super Nintendo Entertainment System | Shigeru Miyamoto | |
| 1991 | Time Twist: Rekishi no Katasumi de... | Adventure | Family Computer Disk System | Tatsuya Hishida | |
| 1991 | The Legend of Zelda: A Link to the Past | Action-adventure | Super Nintendo Entertainment System | Shigeru Miyamoto | |
| 1992 | Wave Race | Racing | Game Boy | Shigeru Miyamoto | |
| 1992 | Super Mario Kart | Kart racing | Super Nintendo Entertainment System | Shigeru Miyamoto | |
| 1993 | Star Fox (Note: Co-developed with Argonaut Software) | Rail shooter, Shoot 'em up | Super Nintendo Entertainment System | Shigeru Miyamoto | |
| 1993 | The Legend of Zelda: Link's Awakening | Action-adventure | Game Boy | Shigeru Miyamoto | |
| 1993 | Super Mario All-Stars | Platform | Super Nintendo Entertainment System | Shigeru Miyamoto | |
| 1994 | Stunt Race FX | Racing | Super Nintendo Entertainment System | Shigeru Miyamoto | |
| 1994 | Donkey Kong | Platform, puzzle | Game Boy | Shigeru Miyamoto | |
| 1994 | Kirby's Dream Course | Sports | Super Nintendo Entertainment System | Satoru Iwata; Shigeru Miyamoto | |
| 1995 | Super Mario World 2: Yoshi's Island | Platform | Super Nintendo Entertainment System | Shigeru Miyamoto | |
| 1996 | Pilotwings 64 (Note: Co-developed with Nintendo Research & Development 3) (Note: Co-developed with Paradigm Entertainment) | Amateur flight simulation | Nintendo 64 | Genyo Takeda; Shigeru Miyamoto | |
| 1996 | Super Mario 64 | Platform | Nintendo 64 | Shigeru Miyamoto | |
| 1996 | Mole Mania | Puzzle | Game Boy | Shigeru Miyamoto | |
| 1996 | Wave Race 64 | Racing | Nintendo 64 | Shigeru Miyamoto | |
| 1996 | Mario Kart 64 | Kart racing | Nintendo 64 | Shigeru Miyamoto | |
| 1997 | Star Fox 64 | Shoot 'em up | Nintendo 64 | Shigeru Miyamoto | |
| 1997 | Yoshi's Story | Platform | Nintendo 64 | Takashi Tezuka | |
| 1998 | 1080° Snowboarding | Sports, racing | Nintendo 64 | Shigeru Miyamoto | |
| 1998 | F-Zero X | Racing | Nintendo 64 | Shigeru Miyamoto | |
| 1998 | Pocket Monsters Stadium (Note: Co-developed with Creatures Inc.) | Role-playing | Nintendo 64 | Kenji Miki; Tsunekazu Ishihara; Satoru Iwata; Shigeru Miyamoto | |
| 1998 | The Legend of Zelda: Ocarina of Time | Action-adventure | Nintendo 64 | Shigeru Miyamoto | |
| 1999 | Pokémon Stadium; Pokémon Stadium 2^{JP} | Role-playing | Nintendo 64 | Kenji Miki; Tsunekazu Ishihara; Satoru Iwata; Shigeru Miyamoto | |
| 2000 | F-Zero X Expansion Kit | Racing | Nintendo 64 (64DD) | Shigeru Miyamoto | |
| 2000 | The Legend of Zelda: Majora's Mask | Action-adventure | Nintendo 64 | Shigeru Miyamoto | |
| 2000 | Pokémon Stadium 2 Pokémon Stadium Gold Silver^{JP} | Role-playing | Nintendo 64 | Kenji Miki; Tsunekazu Ishihara; Satoru Iwata; Shigeru Miyamoto | |
| 2001 | Dōbutsu no Mori | Life simulation | Nintendo 64 | Takashi Tezuka | |
| 2001 | Luigi's Mansion | Action-adventure | GameCube | Shigeru Miyamoto, Takashi Tezuka | |
| 2001 | Pikmin | Real-time strategy | GameCube | Shigeru Miyamoto | |
| 2001 | Animal Crossing | Life simulation | GameCube | Takashi Tezuka | |
| 2002 | Super Mario Sunshine | Platform, action-adventure | GameCube | Shigeru Miyamoto | |
| 2002 | The Legend of Zelda: The Wind Waker | Action-adventure | GameCube | Shigeru Miyamoto; Takashi Tezuka | |
| 2003 | Pokémon Box: Ruby and Sapphire (Note: Co-developed with Game Freak) | Role-playing | GameCube | Shigeru Miyamoto; Kenji Miki; Hiroaki Tsuru | |
| 2003 | Dōbutsu no Mori e+ | Life simulation | GameCube | Takashi Tezuka | |
| 2003 | Mario Kart: Double Dash | Kart racing | GameCube | Shigeru Miyamoto; Tadashi Sugiyama; Shinya Takahashi; Takashi Tezuka | |
| 2003 | Pac-Man Vs. | Maze | GameCube | Shigeru Miyamoto | |
| 2004 | The Legend of Zelda: Four Swords Adventures | Action-adventure | GameCube | Eiji Aonuma, Shigeru Miyamoto | |
| 2004 | Pikmin 2 | Real-time strategy | GameCube | Shigeru Miyamoto, Takashi Tezuka | |
| 2004 | Super Mario 64 DS | Platform | Nintendo DS | Shigeru Miyamoto | |
| 2005 | Yoshi Touch & Go | Platform | Nintendo DS | Takashi Tezuka | |
| 2005 | Big Brain Academy | Puzzle | Nintendo DS | Hiroyuki Kimura | |
| 2005 | Nintendogs | Pet-raising simulation | Nintendo DS | Hideki Konno, Shigeru Miyamoto | |
| 2005 | Mario Kart DS | Racing | Nintendo DS | Hideki Konno, Shigeru Miyamoto | |
| 2005 | Animal Crossing: Wild World | Social simulation | Nintendo DS | Katsuya Eguchi, Takashi Tezuka | |
| 2006 | New Super Mario Bros. | Platform | Nintendo DS | Hiroyuki Kimura, Takashi Tezuka | |
| 2006 | Star Fox Command | Shoot 'em up | Nintendo DS | Takaya Imamura | |
| 2006 | The Legend of Zelda: Twilight Princess | Action-adventure | GameCube; Wii | Shigeru Miyamoto | |
| 2006 | Wii Sports | Sports | Wii | Katsuya Eguchi; Kiyoshi Mizuki | |
| 2006 | Wii Play | Party | Wii | Katsuya Eguchi | |
| 2007 | Big Brain Academy: Wii Degree | Edutainment | Wii | Hiroyuki Kimura | |
| 2007 | The Legend of Zelda: Phantom Hourglass | Action-adventure | Nintendo DS | Eiji Aonuma, Shigeru Miyamoto | |
| 2007 | Link's Crossbow Training | First-person shooter | Wii | Eiji Aonuma | |
| 2007 | Wii Fit | Exergaming | Wii | Tadashi Sugiyama, Shigeru Miyamoto, Takao Sawano | |
| 2008 | Mario Kart Wii | Racing | Wii | Hideki Konno, Shigeru Miyamoto | |
| 2008 | Wii Music | Music | Wii | Takashi Tezuka, Katsuya Eguchi | |
| 2008 | Animal Crossing: City Folk | Social simulation | Wii | Katsuya Eguchi | |
| 2008 | New Play Control! Pikmin | Real-time strategy | Wii | Hiroyuki Kimura | |
| 2008 | New Play Control! Pikmin 2 | Real-time strategy | Wii | Hiroyuki Kimura | |
| 2009 | Wii Sports Resort | Sports | Wii | Katsuya Eguchi | |
| 2009 | Wii Fit Plus | Exergaming | Wii | Tadashi Sugiyama, Shigeru Miyamoto | |
| 2009 | New Super Mario Bros. Wii | Platform | Wii | Takashi Tezuka, Hiroyuki Kimura, Shigeru Miyamoto | |
| 2009 | The Legend of Zelda: Spirit Tracks | Action-adventure | Nintendo DS | Shigeru Miyamoto, Eiji Aonuma | |
| 2011 | Nintendogs + Cats | Digital pet | Nintendo 3DS | Hideki Konno | |
| 2011 | Steel Diver (Note: Co-developed by Vitei) | Submarine simulator | Nintendo 3DS | Tadashi Sugiyama | |
| 2011 | Star Fox 64 3D | Rail shooter | Nintendo 3DS | Tadashi Sugiyama | |
| 2011 | Mario Kart 7 | Racing | 3DS | Hideki Konno | |
| 2011 | The Legend of Zelda: Skyward Sword | Action-adventure | Wii | Eiji Aonuma | |
| 2012 | New Super Mario Bros. 2 | Platform | 3DS | Takashi Tezuka, Hiroyuki Kimura, Shigeru Miyamoto | |
| 2012 | Animal Crossing: New Leaf | Social simulation | 3DS | Katsuya Eguchi | |
| 2012 | New Super Mario Bros. U | Platform | Wii U | Takashi Tezuka, Hiroyuki Kimura, Shigeru Miyamoto | |
| 2012 | Nintendo Land | Party | Wii U | Katsuya Eguchi | |
| 2013 | New Super Luigi U | Platform | Wii U | Takashi Tezuka, Hiroyuki Kimura, Shigeru Miyamoto | |
| 2013 | Pikmin 3 | Real-time strategy | Wii U | Hiroyuki Kimura | |
| 2013 | The Legend of Zelda: The Wind Waker HD | Action-adventure | Wii U | Eiji Aonuma | |
| 2013 | Wii Fit U | Exergaming | Wii U | Tadashi Sugiyama | |
| 2013 | The Legend of Zelda: A Link Between Worlds | Action-adventure | 3DS | Eiji Aonuma | |
| 2014 | Steel Diver: Sub Wars | Submarine simulator | 3DS | Tadashi Sugiyama | |
| 2015 | Splatoon | Third-person shooter | Wii U | Hisashi Nogami | |
| 2015 | Animal Crossing: Happy Home Designer | Social simulation | 3DS | Hisashi Nogami | |
| 2015 | Super Mario Maker | Platform | Wii U | Takashi Tezuka, Hiroyuki Kimura | |

=== Technology Development Department ===
List of video games developed by the Nintendo EAD Technology Development Department
| Year | Title | Genre(s) | Platform(s) |
|---|---|---|---|
| 1999 | Mario Artist: Paint Studio (Note: Co-developed by Software Creations) | Graphics software | 64DD |
| 2000 | Mario Artist: Talent Studio | Graphics software | 64DD |
| 2000 | Mario Artist: Polygon Studio | Graphics software | 64DD |
| 2000 | Mario Artist: Communication Kit | Graphics software | 64DD |

=== Tokyo Software Development Department ===
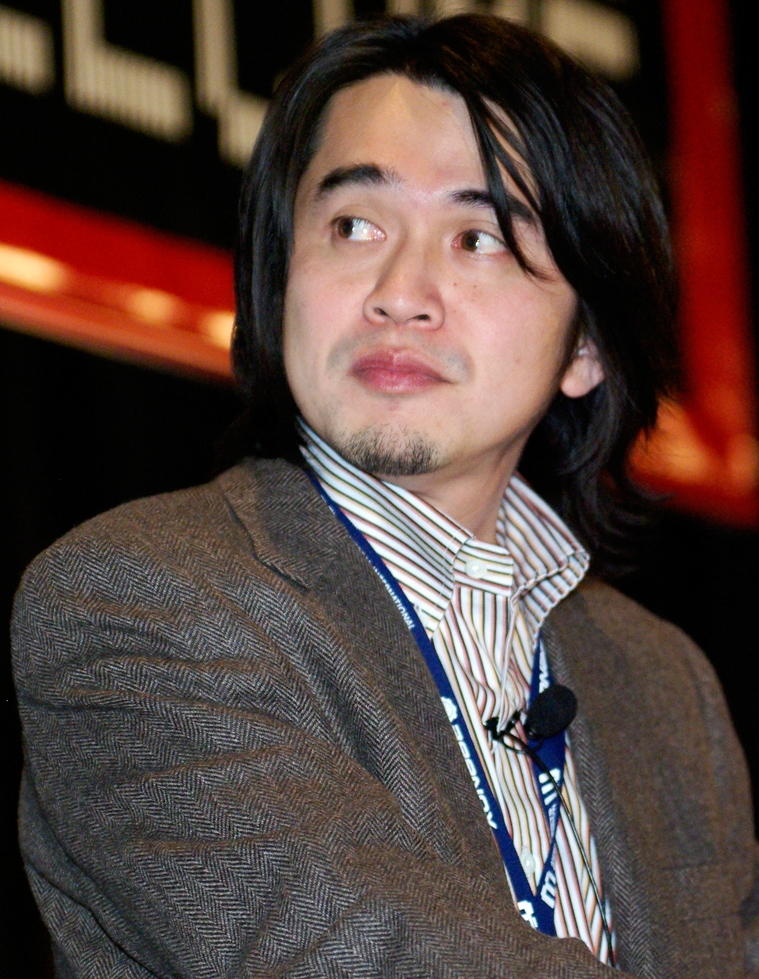
Yoshiaki Koizumi became manager of a second department of the Nintendo EAD division in Tokyo after 2007.

The Nintendo EAD Tokyo Software Development Department was created in 2002 with the goal of bringing in fresh new talent from the capital of Japan who wouldn't be willing to travel hundreds of miles away to Kyoto. It is located in Tokyo, Japan, in the Nintendo Tokyo Office.

In 2003, twenty members of the Entertainment Analysis & Development Division in Kyoto volunteered to relocate to Nintendo's Tokyo Office to expand development resources. These twenty volunteers were primarily from the Super Mario Sunshine team. Management saw it as a good opportunity to expand and recruit several developers who were more comfortable living in Tokyo than relocating to Kyoto.

Takao Shimizu (original manager and producer) and Yoshiaki Koizumi (director) began hiring several recruits in Tokyo coming from several established companies like SEGA, Koei, and Square-Enix. Shimizu and Koizumi jointly spearheaded their first project, Donkey Kong Jungle Beat. This was followed in 2007 by the release of the critically and commercially acclaimed Super Mario Galaxy. After the release of Super Mario Galaxy, Koizumi was promoted to manager and producer and officially opened Tokyo Software Development Group No. 2.

The Tokyo group had veteran game developer Katsuya Eguchi as its general manager, who also oversaw development operations for the Kyoto Software Development Department.

List of video games developed by the Nintendo EAD Software Development Department No.1 in Tokyo
| Year | Title | Genre(s) | Platform(s) |
|---|---|---|---|
| 2004 | Donkey Kong Jungle Beat | Platform | GameCube |
| 2007 | Super Mario Galaxy | Platform | Wii |
| 2009 | Nintendo DS Guide: Ikspiari (Note: Co-developed by the Nintendo EAD Technology Development Department) | Tour guide | Nintendo DS |
| 2009 | Nintendo DS Guide: Kyoto Municipal Museum of Art | Tour guide | Nintendo DS |
| 2009 | Nintendo DS Guide: Osaka Aquarium Kaiyukan | Tour guide | Nintendo DS |
| 2010 | Nintendo DS Guide: Make It Yourself! | Tour guide | Nintendo DSi (DSiWare) |
| 2011 | The Legend of Zelda: Ocarina of Time 3D (Note: Co-developed by Grezzo) | Action-adventure | Nintendo 3DS |
| 2011 | The Legend of Zelda: Four Swords Anniversary Edition | Action-adventure | Nintendo DSi (DSiWare) |
| 2013 | Photos with Mario | Augmented reality | Nintendo 3DS |
| 2013 | Wii U Panorama View | Panorama viewer | Wii U |
| 2013 | Nintendo 3DS Guide: Louvre (Note: Co-developed by indieszero) | Tour guide | Nintendo 3DS |
| 2015 | The Legend of Zelda: Majora's Mask 3D | Action-adventure | Nintendo 3DS |

List of video games developed by the Nintendo EAD Software Development Department No. 2 in Tokyo
| Year | Title | Genre(s) | Platform(s) | Producer(s) |
|---|---|---|---|---|
| 2008 | New Play Control: Donkey Kong Jungle Beat | Platform | Wii | Yoshiaki Koizumi |
| 2008 | Flipnote Studio | Animation | Nintendo DSi (DSiWare) | Yoshiaki Koizumi |
| 2010 | Super Mario Galaxy 2 | Platform | Wii | Yoshiaki Koizumi; Takashi Tezuka |
| 2011 | Super Mario 3D Land | Platform | Nintendo 3DS | Yoshiaki Koizumi |
| 2013 | Flipnote Studio 3D | Animation | Nintendo 3DS | Yoshiaki Koizumi |
| 2013 | Super Mario 3D World | Platform | Wii U | Yoshiaki Koizumi |
| 2013 | NES Remix | Compilation | Wii U | Yoshiaki Koizumi; Masanobu Suzui (Indieszero) |
| 2014 | NES Remix 2 | Compilation | Wii U | Yoshiaki Koizumi; Masanobu Suzui (Indieszero) |
| 2014 | Captain Toad: Treasure Tracker | Platform, puzzle | Wii U | Koichi Hayashida |
