= Minna de Kitaeru Zenno Training =

2006 video game

- Developer: Namco Bandai Games
- Publisher: Namco Bandai Games
- Platform: Arcade
- Release: Arcade: JP: December 21, 2006
- Genre: Noutore
- Mode: Single Player
- Arcade system: Namco System 246

Minna de Kitaeru Zenno Training (みんなで鍛える全脳トレーニング, Minna de Kitaeru Zennō torēningu) is an arcade game released only in Japan by Namco Bandai Games on December 21, 2006.

== Introduction ==
This game, like Brain Age, was supervised by Professor Ryuta Kawashima of Tohoku University. It uses the Rewritable Stage arcade cabinet. The arcade version of The Idolmaster can be converted into this game.

The game has three play modes:

- All-Japan mode, 15 players linked online
- Multiplayer mode, 2~4 players in the same arcade
- One player mode

Player profiles are saved on a rewritable card issued when the users play for the first time. At this time, they choose an animated assistant who provides onscreen instructions and encouragement.

The game includes 39 games divided into three categories, for the areas of the brain each game is meant to train.

It uses the Rakuhira handwriting recognition system, made by Matsushita Electric Industrial Co.

== Games ==
=== For Frontal lobe ===
- Easy calculation: Answering a number of simple math problems as fast as possible.
- The four basic operations: Given three numbers, the players decide which math operation is used.
- Which way the gears turn: Given a number of gears, players choose the ones which will turn in the same direction.

(13 games)

=== For Temporal lobe ===
- Turning over panels: After viewing a set of symbols, the cards are flipped over, the player is given one symbol, and must find the cards with that same symbol.
- Pair dance: Player must decide which two of a number of dancing figures are in unison.
- Figure puzzle

(13 games)

=== For Parietal lobe ===
- Coin exchanging: Changing coins into larger denominations.
- What the major number is: Given a diagram filled with numbers, players identify which number appears the most.
- Touching numbers small to big

(13 games)

== Music ==
The game uses various classical themes as background music:

- The Ruins of Athens Turkish march: Ludwig van Beethoven
- Eine kleine Nachtmusik: Wolfgang Amadeus Mozart
- Orpheus in the Underworld: Jacques Offenbach
- Vivaldi Spring mvt 1 Allegro: Antonio Vivaldi
- Symphony No. 6: Ludwig van Beethoven
- Symphony No. 5: Ludwig van Beethoven
- Variations on "Ah vous dirais-je, Maman": Wolfgang Amadeus Mozart
- Messiah: George Frideric Handel

== Extra link ==
- 『みんなで鍛える全脳トレーニング』公式サイト (Japanese)
