= Professor Kageyama's Maths Training: The Hundred Cell Calculation Method =

2007 puzzle video game

- Australian box art
- Developer: Jupiter
- Publishers: JP: Shogakukan; WW: Nintendo
- Platform: Nintendo DS
- Release: JP: December 7, 2006; AU: February 7, 2008; EU: February 8, 2008; NA: January 12, 2009
- Genre: Puzzle game
- Modes: Single player, multiplayer

Professor Kageyama's Maths Training: The Hundred Cell Calculation Method (Note: Known in Japan as Kageyama's Method for DS: "Masu X Masu Hundred Masu Calculation" (Japanese: DS陰山メソッド ます×ます百ます計算, Hepburn: DS Kageyama Mesoddo: Masu x Masu Hyaku Masu Keisan)) is a puzzle video game published by Nintendo and developed by Jupiter for the Nintendo DS handheld video game console. It was first released in Japan, then later in Europe and Australasia. It was released in North America as Personal Trainer: Math on January 12, 2009 and also in South Korea in 2009. The game is part of both the Touch! Generations and Personal Trainer series. The game received mixed reviews, with common criticisms cited for the game's difficulty in recognizing some numbers and for not being very entertaining to play. At GameRankings, it holds an average review score of 65%.

== Gameplay ==
Maths Training, designed to be played daily, uses a method called "The Hundred Cell Calculation Method" that focuses on repetition of basic arithmetic. This method was developed by Professor Kageyama who works at the Centre for Research and Educational Development at Ritsumeikan University, Kyoto. Utilizing a 10 x 10 grid of blank squares lined with rows of numbers along the top and side of the grid, the player has to match up each top number with each side number and add or subtract or multiply them. They then fill in the appropriate square with the appropriate answer.

The game is played by holding the Nintendo DS vertically like a book, and it supports both right- and left-handed users, allowing them to view the exercises on the message screen while they note down their answers with the stylus on the Touch Screen. The user can play against up to 15 other Nintendo DS users by using the DS Download Play option or with multiple game cards.

== See also ==
- List of Nintendo DS games
- Personal Trainer: Cooking
- Personal Trainer: Walking
