= Touch! Generations =

Nintendo brand for videogames

- North American and South American logo for the Nintendo DS
- Produced by: Nintendo

Touch! Generations (Note: Japanese: タッチ!・ジェネレーションズ) is a brand created by Nintendo to denote games on the Nintendo DS and Wii that are intended to appeal to a broader audience than the traditional gamer. Many of the brand's titles, such as Cooking Guide and 100 Classic Book Collection, fall into the category of applications rather than conventional video games. Nintendo originally introduced the brand in Japan in April 2005; it was subsequently introduced in North America and Europe in June 2006. Nintendo retired the brand with the launch of the Nintendo 3DS in 2011, six years after its introduction. Despite this, some games that were introduced under the brand continue to receive follow-up entries on the contemporary and future Nintendo consoles.

The Touch! Generations brand was initially conceived in Japan as a response to the country's faster population aging rate compared to Western regions, with Nintendo seeking to attract non-traditional gamers to supplement their shrinking target market of hardcore gamers. George Harrison of Nintendo of America stated that the brand was designed to indicate titles suitable for "newcomers and novices".

== Games ==
The initial line-up of Touch! Generations games in Japan, launched between April and June 2005, included Electroplankton, Nintendogs, Brain Age: Train Your Brain in Minutes a Day!, and Big Brain Academy.

Big Brain Academy and Magnetica were the first games in North America to have the designation for the Touch! Generations brand, with both releasing on June 5, 2006; they were followed up by Sudoku Gridmaster on June 26. In addition, several previously released games were labeled under the Touch! Generations brand. The games for Touch! Generations vary between different countries.

In Japan, the brand had massive success, especially with the Brain Training games ranking high in game sales. A soundtrack also exists with music from some of the games. It was released on October 14, 2008 and could be obtained only from Club Nintendo for 400 coins.

In North America, Brain Age: Train Your Brain in Minutes a Day! was released on April 16, 2006 in the United States and in Canada on April 17 of that year, but the Touch! Generations brand was not launched until June 5, 2006.

The Touch! Generations brand was introduced in Europe on June 9, 2006 with the release of Brain Age, which was renamed Dr. Kawashima's Brain Training: How Old Is Your Brain?.

== Reception ==
The Touch! Generations games have been received well. The Nintendogs series is one of the most popular DS software titles, selling 23.96 million units as of May 2009, followed by Brain Age at 19.01 million units and Brain Age 2: More Training in Minutes a Day! around nearly 15 million units as of September 2015.
