= Big Brain Academy =

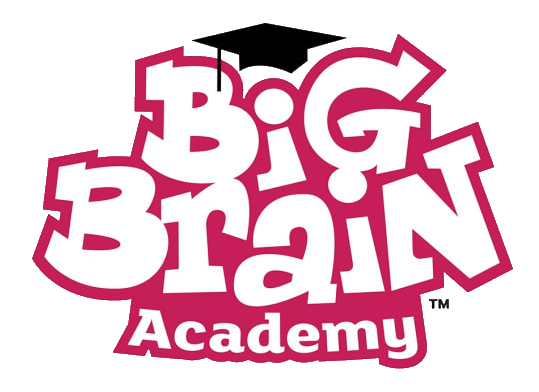
- Logo since 2021
- Genre: Puzzle
- Developers: Nintendo EAD (2005–2007); Nintendo EPD (2021)
- Publisher: Nintendo
- Platforms: Nintendo DS, Wii, Nintendo Switch
- First release: Big Brain Academy; June 30, 2005
- Latest release: Big Brain Academy: Brain vs. Brain; December 3, 2021

Big Brain Academy is a series of puzzle video games developed and published by Nintendo. Similar to the Brain Age series, each game features a number of activities designed to test, measure, and improve the player's mental skills. The first two games were released under the Touch! Generations brand, which has since been discontinued.

Each game features a character named Dr. Lobe, the headmaster of Big Brain Academy who acts as a guide for players.

== Video games ==
Each game in the series asks players to complete tests in which they must answer questions or solve minigame-style puzzle activities in order to calculate and measure the "mass" and "age" of their brain. Minigames are designed to test player's memory, logic, math, and analysis skills, with each one being able to be completed in under a minute. Some tasks that have appeared in several entries in the series include being asked to spot differences between images, ordering numbers from lowest to highest, and repeating a given order. A multiplayer component has also been available in every Big Brain Academy game, however the Nintendo DS game only supports local play and not online multiplayer.

=== Big Brain Academy ===
Big Brain Academy was released in Japan for the Nintendo DS on June 30, 2005, and subsequently in other regions in summer 2006.

=== Big Brain Academy: Wii Degree ===
Big Brain Academy: Wii Degree, known as Big Brain Academy for Wii in PAL regions, was released for the Wii on April 26, 2007, in Japan and later on June 11, 2007, in North America. The game utilises the Wii Remote as a pointer device and takes advantage of Mii avatars and the WiiConnect24 service for online multiplayer and score sharing.

=== Big Brain Academy: Brain vs. Brain ===
Big Brain Academy: Brain vs. Brain is the first new entry in the series in 14 years, which released for the Nintendo Switch on December 3, 2021. The game makes use of the system's handheld features such as the touchscreen, while also supporting docked mode for traditional play.

== Reception ==
Games in the Big Brain Academy series have received mixed-to-positive reviews from critics, with the series praised for its multiplayer components and compared favourably to other Touch! Generations franchise Brain Age. The first two games have received "Double Platinum" sales award from the Entertainment and Leisure Software Publishers Association (ELSPA).

== Other media ==
Big Brain Academy Board Game, a board game created by University Games inspired by the original DS version of the game, was released in 2007. Cards contain activities from the Nintendo DS game, with players competing in teams to determine who has more weight on the Brain-O-Meter Scale. By collecting snowflakes in the online Adobe Flash game UPIXO in Action: Mission in Snowdriftland, files for Big Brain Academy could be unlocked, which were promoted alongside other Nintendo DS and Wii games. Microgames based on Big Brain Academy have appeared in the WarioWare games WarioWare: D.I.Y. and WarioWare: Get It Together!. Additionally, Dr. Lobe, the series mascot, has appeared as stickers in Super Smash Bros. Brawl and as a Spirit in Super Smash Bros. Ultimate.
