= List of Nintendo handheld video games =

Nintendo is a Japanese multinational video game company headquartered in Kyoto. It develops, publishes, and manufactures both video games and video game consoles. Since the release of the Game & Watch line of systems in 1980, Nintendo has been regularly producing handheld video games, often on their own hardware. While the release of the hybrid system Nintendo Switch in 2017, slowed down their output of handheld video games, they kept producing handheld games for their own systems until 2019, and they continue to make new handheld video games on mobile phones since.

== Dedicated console ==
=== Game & Watch ===
Title	Developer(s)	Release date (Note: Due to the lack of sources regarding the international release dates of the Game & Watch series, the listed dates refer only to the initial worldwide release. The regional categorization is only used to indicate which countries a model was not released in, rather than to specify region-specific release dates.)		
Title	Developer(s)	JP	NA	PAL
Silver Models
Game & Watch: Ball (Note: First released as Toss-Up in North America.)	Nintendo R&D1	April 28, 1980		
Game & Watch: Flagman (Note: First released as Flag Man in North America.)	Nintendo R&D1	June 5, 1980		
Game & Watch: Vermin (Note: First released as The Exterminator in North America.)	Nintendo R&D1	July 10, 1980		
Game & Watch: Fire (Note: First released as Fireman Fireman in North America.) (Silver Model)	Nintendo R&D1	July 31, 1980		
Game & Watch: Judge	Nintendo R&D1	October 4, 1980		
Gold Models
Game & Watch: Manhole (Gold Model)	Nintendo R&D1	January 27, 1981		
Game & Watch: Helmet (Note: First released as Headache in the United Kingdom.)	Nintendo R&D1	February 21, 1981		
Game & Watch: Lion	Nintendo R&D1	April 27, 1981		
Wide Screen Models
Game & Watch: Parachute	Nintendo R&D1	June 19, 1981		
Game & Watch: Octopus	Nintendo R&D1	July 16, 1981		
Game & Watch: Popeye (Wide Screen Model)	Nintendo R&D1	August 5, 1981		
Game & Watch: Chef	Nintendo R&D1	September 8, 1981		
Game & Watch: Mickey Mouse (Wide Screen Model)	Nintendo R&D1	October 9, 1981		
Game & Watch: Egg	Nintendo R&D1	Unreleased	October 9, 1981	
Game & Watch: Fire (Wide Screen Model)	Nintendo R&D1	December 4, 1981		
Game & Watch: Turtle Bridge	Nintendo R&D1	February 1, 1982		
Game & Watch: Fire Attack	Nintendo R&D1	March 26, 1982		
Game & Watch: Snoopy Tennis	Nintendo R&D1	April 28, 1982		
Multi Screen Models
Game & Watch: Oil Panic	Nintendo R&D1	May 28, 1982		
Game & Watch: Donkey Kong	Nintendo R&D1	June 3, 1982		
Game & Watch: Mickey & Donald	Nintendo R&D1	November 12, 1982		
Game & Watch: Green House	Nintendo R&D1	December 6, 1982		
Game & Watch: Donkey Kong II	Nintendo R&D1	March 7, 1983		
Game & Watch: Mario Bros.	Nintendo R&D1	March 14, 1983		
Game & Watch: Rain Shower	Nintendo R&D1	Unreleased	August 10, 1983	
Game & Watch: Lifeboat	Nintendo R&D1	Unreleased	October 25, 1983	
Game & Watch: Pinball	Nintendo R&D1	December 5, 1983		
Game & Watch: Black Jack	Nintendo R&D1	February 15, 1985		
Game & Watch: Squish	Nintendo R&D1	Unreleased	April 17, 1986	
Game & Watch: Bomb Sweeper	Nintendo R&D1	Unreleased	June 15, 1987	
Game & Watch: Safebuster	Nintendo R&D1	Unreleased	January 12, 1988	
Game & Watch: Gold Cliff	Nintendo R&D1	Unreleased	October 19, 1988	
Game & Watch: Zelda	Nintendo R&D1	Unreleased	August 26, 1989	
New Wide Screen Models
Game & Watch: Donkey Kong Jr. (New Wide Screen Model)	Nintendo R&D1	October 26, 1982		
Game & Watch: Mario's Cement Factory (New Wide Screen Model)	Nintendo R&D1	June 16, 1983		
Game & Watch: Manhole (New Wide Screen Model)	Nintendo R&D1	Unreleased	August 24, 1983	
Game & Watch: Tropical Fish	Nintendo R&D1	Unreleased	July 8, 1985	
Game & Watch: Super Mario Bros. (New Wide Screen Model)	Nintendo R&D1	Unreleased	March 8, 1988	
Game & Watch: Climber (New Wide Screen Model)	Nintendo R&D1	Unreleased	March 8, 1988	
Game & Watch: Balloon Fight (New Wide Screen Model)	Nintendo R&D1	Unreleased	March 8, 1988	
Game & Watch: Mario the Juggler	Nintendo R&D1	Unreleased	October 14, 1991	
Table Top Models
Game & Watch: Donkey Kong Jr. (Table Top Model)	Nintendo R&D1	April 28, 1983		
Game & Watch: Mario's Cement Factory (Table Top Model)	Nintendo R&D1	April 28, 1983		
Game & Watch: Snoopy (Table Top Model)	Nintendo R&D1	July 5, 1983		
Game & Watch: Popeye (Table Top Model)	Nintendo R&D1	Unreleased	August 17, 1983	
Panorama Screen Models
Game & Watch: Snoopy (Panorama Screen Model)	Nintendo R&D1	August 30, 1983		
Game & Watch: Popeye (Panorama Screen Model)	Nintendo R&D1	August 30, 1983		
Game & Watch: Donkey Kong Jr. (Panorama Screen Model)	Nintendo R&D1	October 7, 1983		
Game & Watch: Mario's Bombs Away	Nintendo R&D1	November 10, 1983		
Game & Watch: Mickey Mouse (Panorama Screen Model)	Nintendo R&D1	Unreleased	February 28, 1984	
Game & Watch: Donkey Kong Circus	Nintendo R&D1	Unreleased	September 6, 1984	
Super Color Models
Game & Watch: Spitball Sparky	Nintendo R&D1	February 7, 1984		
Game & Watch: Crab Grab	Nintendo R&D1	February 21, 1984		
Micro VS. System Models
Game & Watch: Boxing (Note: Released as Punch-Out!! in North America.)	Nintendo R&D1	July 31, 1984		
Game & Watch: Donkey Kong 3	Nintendo R&D1	August 20, 1984		
Game & Watch: Donkey Kong Hockey	Nintendo R&D1	November 13, 1984		
Crystal Screen Models
Game & Watch: Super Mario Bros. (Crystal Screen Model)	Nintendo R&D1	Unreleased	June 25, 1986	
Game & Watch: Climber (Crystal Screen Model)	Nintendo R&D1	Unreleased	July 4, 1986	
Game & Watch: Balloon Fight (Crystal Screen Model)	Nintendo R&D1	Unreleased	November 19, 1986	
Color Screen Models
Game & Watch: Super Mario Bros. (Color Screen Model)	Nintendo	November 13, 2020		
Game & Watch: The Legend of Zelda	Nintendo	November 12, 2021		
Other Models
Bassmate Computer (Note: Published by and sold as a Telko product, but made by Nintendo.)	Telko, Nintendo	Unreleased	1984	Unreleased
Game & Watch: Super Mario Bros. (Special Edition) (Note: Reward given to players who participated in a competition of Famicom Grand Prix: F1 Race and submitted their scores to Nintendo.)	Nintendo R&D1	August 19, 1987	Unreleased	Unreleased
Game & Watch: Ball (Reissue) (Note: Only though Club Nintendo.)	Nintendo R&D1	April 2010	February 2011	November 2011

=== Others ===
Title	Developer(s)	Release date			Ref.
Title	Developer(s)	JP	NA	PAL	Ref.
Computer Mah-jong Yakuman	Nintendo R&D1	October 18, 1983	Unreleased	Unreleased	
Pokémon Pikachu	Nintendo	March 27, 1998	November 2, 1998	November 19, 1999	
Pocket Hello Kitty	Nintendo, Imagineer	August 21, 1998	Unreleased	Unreleased	
Pokémon Pikachu 2 GS	Jupiter	November 21, 1999	October 16, 2000	2000	
Pokémotion	Nintendo NSD	August 1, 2003	Unreleased	Unreleased	
Pokéwalker	Game Freak	September 12, 2009	March 14, 2010	March 26, 2010	
Pokémon GO Plus	Nintendo	September 16, 2016			
Pokémon GO Plus +	Nintendo	July 14, 2023	July 14, 2023	July 21, 2023	
Nintendo Sound Clock: Alarmo	Nintendo PTD	October 9, 2024			
Pokémon Red & Pokémon Blue Game Music Collection: Game Boy Jukebox (Note: Distributed exclusively worldwide by The Pokémon Company through Pokémon Center Online.)	Nintendo	February 28, 2026			

== Game Boy ==
Licenses owned or co-owned by Nintendo
Title	Developer(s)	Release date			Ref.
Title	Developer(s)	JP	NA	PAL	Ref.
Alleyway	Nintendo R&D1; Intelligent Systems	April 21, 1989	July 31, 1989	September 28, 1990	
Baseball	Nintendo R&D1	April 21, 1989	July 31, 1989	September 28, 1990	
Super Mario Land	Nintendo R&D1	April 21, 1989	July 31, 1989	September 28, 1990	
Yakuman	Intelligent Systems	April 21, 1989	Unreleased	Unreleased	
Tennis	Nintendo R&D1; Intelligent Systems	May 29, 1989	July 31, 1989	1990	
Golf	Nintendo	November 28, 1989	February 1990	1990	
Solar Striker	Nintendo R&D1; Minakuchi Engineering	January 26, 1990	February 2, 1990	September 28, 1990	
Dr. Mario	Nintendo R&D1	July 27, 1990	December 1, 1990	April 30, 1991	
Radar Mission	Nintendo R&D1; Pax Softnica	October 23, 1990	February 1991	1991	
Balloon Kid	Nintendo R&D1; Pax Softnica	Unreleased	October 5, 1990	January 31, 1991	
F-1 Race	Nintendo R&D1	November 9, 1990	February 3, 1991	October 10, 1991	
Play Action Football	Tose	Unreleased	December 1990	Unreleased	
Game Boy Wars	Intelligent Systems; Nintendo R&D1	May 21, 1991	Unreleased	Unreleased	
Kid Icarus: Of Myths and Monsters	Nintendo R&D1; Tose	VC-only	November 1991	May 21, 1992	
Metroid II: Return of Samus	Nintendo R&D1	January 21, 1992	November 1991	May 21, 1992	
Yoshi	Game Freak	December 14, 1991	July 10, 1992	December 17, 1992	
Kirby's Dream Land	HAL Laboratory	April 27, 1992	August 1992	1992	
X	Nintendo R&D1; Argonaut Games	May 29, 1992	Unreleased	Unreleased	
Wave Race	Nintendo EAD; Pax Softnica	Unreleased	July 1992	June 24, 1997	
Kaeru no Tame ni Kane wa Naru	Nintendo R&D1; Intelligent Systems	September 14, 1992	Unreleased	Unreleased	
Super Mario Land 2: 6 Golden Coins	Nintendo R&D1	October 21, 1992	November 2, 1992	January 28, 1993	
Yoshi's Cookie	Tose	November 21, 1992	April 1993	1993	
Magnetic Soccer	Nintendo	Unreleased	Unreleased	1992	
Top Rank Tennis	Pax Softnica	Unreleased	May 1993	1993	
The Legend of Zelda: Link's Awakening	Nintendo EAD	June 6, 1993	August 1993	November 18, 1993	
Kirby's Pinball Land	HAL Laboratory	November 27, 1993	November 30, 1993	December 1, 1993	
Wario Land: Super Mario Land 3	Nintendo R&D1	January 21, 1994	March 13, 1994	May 13, 1994	
Donkey Kong	Nintendo EAD; Pax Softnica	June 14, 1994	June 1994	September 24, 1994	
Wario Blast: Featuring Bomberman!	Hudson Soft	Unreleased	November 1994	June 29, 1995	
Mario's Picross	Jupiter, Ape	March 14, 1995	March 1995	27 July 1995	
Kirby's Dream Land 2	HAL Laboratory	March 21, 1995	May 1, 1995	July 31, 1995	
Game Boy Gallery	Nintendo R&D1; Tose	Unreleased	Unreleased	April 27, 1995	
Donkey Kong Land	Rare	July 27, 1995	June 26, 1995	August 24, 1995	
Vegas Stakes	HAL Laboratory	Unreleased	November 13, 1995	1995	
Killer Instinct	Rare	Unreleased	November 1995	November 1995	
Kirby's Block Ball	Tose, Nintendo R&D1	December 14, 1995	May 13, 1996	August 29, 1996	
Pocket Monsters Aka and Midori	Game Freak	February 27, 1996	Unreleased	Unreleased	
Mole Mania	Nintendo EAD; Pax Softnica	July 21, 1996	February 1997	May 1997	
Tetris Attack	Intelligent Systems, Nintendo R&D1	October 26, 1996	August 11, 1996	November 28, 1996	
Donkey Kong Land 2	Rare	November 23, 1996	September 23, 1996	November 28, 1996	
Pocket Monsters Ao	Game Freak	October 15, 1996	Unreleased	Unreleased	
Picross 2	Jupiter Corporation, Creatures Inc.	October 19, 1996	Unreleased	Unreleased	
Kirby's Star Stacker	HAL Laboratory	January 25, 1997	July 14, 1997	October 25, 1997	
Game & Watch Gallery	Nintendo R&D1	February 1, 1997	May 1997	August 28, 1997	
Game Boy Gallery 2	Tose	September 27, 1997	Unreleased	Unreleased	
Donkey Kong Land III	Rare	Unreleased	October 27, 1997	October 30, 1997	
Ken Griffey Jr. Presents Major League Baseball	Software Creations	Unreleased	October 1997	1997	
James Bond 007	Saffire	Unreleased	February 9, 1998	January 29, 1998	
Game Boy Camera	Nintendo R&D1; Jupiter; Creatures Inc.	February 21, 1998	June 1, 1998	June 4, 1998	
Wario Land II	Nintendo R&D1	Unreleased	March 2, 1998	March 26, 1998	
Pokémon Yellow Version: Special Pikachu Edition	Game Freak	September 12, 1998	October 18, 1999	June 16, 2000	
Pokémon Red and Blue Version	Game Freak	Unreleased	September 28, 1998	October 5, 1999	
Game compilations
Big Value Twin Pack: Super Mario Land & Super Mario Land 2: 6 Golden Coins	Nintendo R&D1	Unreleased	Unreleased	1995	
Big Value Twin Pack: Wario Land: Super Mario Land 3 & Wario Blast: Featuring Bomberman!	Nintendo R&D1, Hudson Soft	Unreleased	Unreleased	1995	
Big Value Twin Pack: Donkey Kong & Donkey Kong Land	Nintendo EAD, Pax Softnica, Rare	Unreleased	Unreleased	1995	

Licensed to Nintendo (Worldwide)
Title	Developer(s)	Licensor(s)	Release date			Ref.
Title	Developer(s)	Licensor(s)	JP	NA	PAL	Ref.
Tetris	Nintendo R&D1	Elorg	June 14, 1989	July 31, 1989	September 28, 1990	
Qix	Nintendo R&D1; Minakuchi Engineering	Taito	April 13, 1990	May 24, 1990	September 28, 1990	
Super R.C. Pro-Am	Rare	Rare	Unreleased	October 1991	April 23, 1992	
Tetris 2	Tose	Elorg	June 14, 1994	December 1993	October 27, 1994	
Arcade Classic No. 1: Asteroids / Missile Command (Note: Standalone Game Boy versions of Asteroids and Missile Command were published by Accolade in 1992.)	The Code Monkeys	Atari	Unreleased	July 1995	1995	
Arcade Classic No. 2: Centipede / Millipede (Note: Standalone Game Boy version of Centipede was published by Accolade in 1992.)	The Code Monkeys	Atari	Unreleased	August 1995	August 1995	
Arcade Classic No. 4: Defender / Joust	Wiliams	Williams Electronics	Unreleased	October 1995	1995	
Game compilations
Big Value Twin Pack: Tetris & Tetris 2	Nintendo R&D1, Tose	Elorg	Unreleased	Unreleased	1995	
Big Value Twin Pack: Asteroids + Missile Command & Centipede + Millipede	The Code Monkeys	Atari	Unreleased	Unreleased	1995	

Licensed to Nintendo (original release published by another company)
North America and PAL regions only
Title	Licensor(s)	Release date		Ref.
Title	Licensor(s)	NA	PAL	Ref.
Nintendo World Cup	Technōs Japan	June 1991	1991	
Space Invaders	Taito	October 1994	1994	
Street Fighter II	Capcom	September 1995	1995	
Arcade Classic No. 3: Galaga / Galaxian	Namco	September 1995	1995	
Tetris Blast	Bullet-Proof Software	January 1996	June 1996	
Tetris Plus	Jaleco	August 25, 1997	1996	
North America only
Title	Licensor(s)	Release date		Ref.
Title	Licensor(s)	NA		Ref.
Battle Arena Toshinden	Takara	November 1996		
The King of Fighters '95	Takara	February 1997		
Bomberman GB	Hudson Soft	April 10, 1998		
PAL regions only
Title	Licensor(s)	Release date		Ref.
Title	Licensor(s)	PAL		Ref.
Boulder Dash	Victor	1990		
Double Dragon	Technōs Japan	1990		
Pinball: Revenge of the Gator	HAL Laboratory	1990		
King of the Zoo	ASCII	1990		
Kwirk	Atlus	1990		
Mercenary Force	Meldac	1990		
Othello	Kawada	1990		
The Amazing Spider-Man	LJN	1990		
Wizards & Warriors X: The Fortress of Fear	Acclaim	1990		
Burai Fighter Deluxe	Taito	1991		
Dynablaster	Hudson Soft	1991		
Gargoyle's Quest	Capcom	1991		
Kung-Fu Master	Irem	1991		
R-Type	Irem	1991		
Side Pocket	Data East	1991		
The Rescue of Princess Blobette	Jaleco	1991		
Mega Man: Dr. Wily's Revenge	Capcom	July 10, 1992		
Mega Man II	Capcom	July 31, 1992		
The Chessmaster	Hi Tech Expressions	1992		
Nigel Mansell's World Championship Racing	Gremlin Interactive	1992		
Mega Man III	Capcom	June 19, 1993		
Battletoads in Ragnarok's World	Tradewest	1993		
Ms. Pac-Man	Namco	1993		
Mystic Quest	Square	1993		
Soccer	Elite Systems	1994		
Adventures of Lolo	Imagineer	1995		
Pac-In-Time	Namco	1995		
Disney's Pinocchio	Disney	1996		
Toy Story	Disney	1996		
Star Wars	Capcom	1997		
Disney's Hercules	Disney	1997		
Disney's Mulan	Disney	1998		
Pocket Bomberman	Hudson Soft	1998		
The Little Mermaid	Capcom	1998		
Australia only
Title	Licensor(s)	Release date		Ref.
Title	Licensor(s)	AU		Ref.
Legend of the River King GB	Natsume Inc.	1998		
DuckTales	Capcom	1998		
Darkwing Duck	Capcom	1998		
Disney's Aladdin	Virgin Interactive	1998		
The Bugs Bunny Crazy Castle	Kemco	1998		
Brazil only
Title	Licensor(s)	Release date		Ref.
Title	Licensor(s)	BRA		Ref.
The Bugs Bunny Crazy Castle	Kemco	1998		
Only under Player's Choice label (North America only)
Title	Licensor(s)	Release date		Ref.
Title	Licensor(s)	NA		Ref.
Mega Man: Dr. Wily's Revenge	Capcom	1996		
Star Wars	Capcom	May 20, 1996		
The Bugs Bunny Crazy Castle 2	Kemco	May 20, 1996		
Mickey's Dangerous Chase	Capcom	1997		
The Little Mermaid	Capcom	1997		
The Smurfs	Infogrames	1998		
Mickey Mouse: Magic Wands!	Kemco	May 1998		
The Bugs Bunny Crazy Castle	Kemco	1998		
Mega Man II	Capcom	1998		
DuckTales 2	Capcom	1998		
Only under Classic Serie label (Note: Also found under the names Nintendo Classics, Golden Hits Collection or Série Classic depending on the country.) (PAL regions only)
Title	Licensor(s)	Release date		Ref.
Title	Licensor(s)	PAL		Ref.
The Bugs Bunny Crazy Castle	Kemco	1998		
Only under Disney's Classic video games label (PAL regions only)
Title	Licensor(s)	Release date		Ref.
Title	Licensor(s)	PAL		Ref.
DuckTales	Capcom	1998		
Who Framed Roger Rabbit	Capcom	1998		
The Lion King	Virgin Interactive	1998		
The Little Mermaid	Capcom	1998		
The Jungle Book	Virgin Interactive	1998		
Mickey's Dangerous Chase	Capcom	1998		
Disney's Aladdin	Virgin Interactive	1998		

Nintendo as distributor only (no involvement in licensing or publishing)
Under Disney's Classic video games label only, PAL regions only
Title	Licensor(s)	Release date	Ref.
Title	Licensor(s)	PAL	Ref.
Disney's Aladdin	Virgin Interactive	1998	

=== Nintendo Power ===
Licenses owned or co-owned by Nintendo
Title	Developer(s)	Release date	Ref.
Title	Developer(s)	JP	Ref.
Donkey Kong	Pax Softnica	March 1, 2000	
Super Donkey Kong GB	Rare	March 1, 2000	
Donkey Kong Land	Rare	March 1, 2000	
Dr. Mario	Nintendo R&D1	March 1, 2000	
F-1 Race	HAL Laboratory	March 1, 2000	
Game Boy Gallery	Nintendo R&D1, TOSE	March 1, 2000	
Game Boy Gallery 2	TOSE	March 1, 2000	
Game Boy Wars	Nintendo R&D1, Intelligent Systems	March 1, 2000	
Golf	Nintendo R&D2, HAL Laboratory	March 1, 2000	
Hoshi no Kirby	HAL Laboratory	March 1, 2000	
Hoshi no Kirby 2	HAL Laboratory	March 1, 2000	
Kaeru no Tame ni Kane wa Naru	Nintendo R&D1, Intelligent Systems	March 1, 2000	
Kirby no Block Ball	Nintendo R&D1, HAL Laboratory	March 1, 2000	
Kirby no Kirakira Kids	HAL Laboratory	March 1, 2000	
Kirby no Pinball	HAL Laboratory	March 1, 2000	
Mario no Picross	Jupiter, Ape	March 1, 2000	
Metroid II: Return of Samus	Nintendo R&D1	March 1, 2000	
Mogurānia	Pax Softnica	March 1, 2000	
Picross 2	Jupiter, Ape	March 1, 2000	
Solar Striker	Nintendo R&D1, Minakuchi Engineering	March 1, 2000	
Super Mario Land	Nintendo R&D1	March 1, 2000	
Super Mario Land 2: 6-Tsu no Kinkoka	Nintendo R&D1	March 1, 2000	
Super Mario Land 3: Wario Land	Nintendo R&D1	March 1, 2000 (Note: Released pre-installed on a Nintendo Power cartridge and through the standard service.)	
Tennis	Nintendo EAD, Intelligent Systems	March 1, 2000	
Yakuman	Intelligent Systems	March 1, 2000	
Yoshi no Cookie	TOSE	March 1, 2000	
Yoshi no Panepon	Intelligent Systems	March 1, 2000	
Alleyway	Nintendo R&D1	August 1, 2000	
Radar Mission	Nintendo R&D1, Pax Softnica	August 1, 2000	
Tetris	Nintendo R&D1	September 1, 2000	

== Virtual Boy ==
Licenses owned or co-owned by Nintendo
Title	Developer(s)	Release date		Ref.
Title	Developer(s)	JP	NA	Ref.
Mario's Tennis	Nintendo R&D1	July 21, 1995	August 14, 1995	
Galactic Pinball	Intelligent Systems	July 21, 1995	August 14, 1995	
Teleroboxer	Nintendo R&D1	July 21, 1995	August 14, 1995	
Mario Clash	Nintendo R&D1	September 28, 1995	October 1, 1995	
Virtual Boy Wario Land	Nintendo R&D1	December 1, 1995	November 20, 1995	
Nester's Funky Bowling	Saffire	Unreleased	February 26, 1996	
3D Tetris	T&E Soft	NSO-only	March 22, 1996	
Dragon Hopper	Intelligent Systems	August 4, 2026 (Note: Released only on Nintendo Classics.)		
Zero Racers	Nintendo R&D1, Pax Softnica	August 4, 2026		

Licensed to Nintendo (original release published by another company)
North America only
Title	Licensor(s)	Release date	Ref.
Title	Licensor(s)	NA	Ref.
Red Alarm	T&E Soft	August 14, 1995	
Golf	T&E Soft	November 1995	
Panic Bomber	Hudson Soft	December 1995	
Vertical Force	Hudson Soft	December 1995	

== Game Boy Color ==
Licenses owned or co-owned by Nintendo
Title	Developer(s)	Release date			Ref.
Title	Developer(s)	JP	NA	PAL	Ref.
Wario Land II	Nintendo R&D1	October 21, 1998	February 10, 1999	February 25, 1999	
Game & Watch Gallery 2	Nintendo R&D1; Tose	Unreleased	November 18, 1998	November 23, 1998	
The Legend of Zelda: Link's Awakening DX	Nintendo EAD	December 12, 1998	December 15, 1998	January 1, 1999	
Quest for Camelot	Titus Interactive	Unreleased	December 16, 1998	1999	
Pokémon Trading Card Game	Hudson Soft, Creatures Inc.	December 18, 1998	April 10, 2000	December 15, 2001	
Game & Watch Gallery 3	Tose	April 8, 1999	December 6, 1999	February 2000	
Pokémon Pinball	Jupiter, HAL Laboratory	April 14, 1999	June 28, 1999	October 6, 2000	
Super Mario Bros. Deluxe	Nintendo R&D2	Nintendo Power only	April 30, 1999	July 1, 1999	
Ken Griffey Jr.'s Slugfest	Software Creations	Unreleased	June 3, 1999	Unreleased	
Mario Golf	Camelot Software Planning	August 10, 1999	October 5, 1999	October 26, 1999	
Pokémon Gold and Silver Version	Game Freak	November 21, 1999	October 15, 2000	April 6, 2001	
NBA 3 on 3 Featuring Kobe Bryant	Left Field Productions	Unreleased	December 7, 1999	Unreleased	
Bionic Commando: Elite Forces	Nintendo Software Technology	Unreleased	January 24, 2000	January 2000 (Note: Original PAL version only released in Australia, but later became available in Europe through the Virtual Console release.)	
Donkey Kong GB: Dinky Kong & Dixie Kong	Rare	January 28, 2000	Unreleased	Unreleased	
Trade & Battle: Card Hero	Nintendo R&D1; Intelligent Systems	February 21, 2000	Unreleased	Unreleased	
Wario Land 3	Nintendo R&D1	March 21, 2000	May 30, 2000	April 14, 2000	
Crystalis	Nintendo Software Technology	Unreleased	June 26, 2000	Unreleased	
Warlocked	Bits Studios	Unreleased	July 24, 2000	Unreleased	
Kirby Tilt 'n' Tumble	Nintendo R&D2	August 23, 2000	April 11, 2001	NSO-only	
Pokémon Puzzle Challenge	Intelligent Systems	September 21, 2000	December 4, 2000	June 8, 2001	
Tottoko Hamtaro:Tomodachi Daisakusen Dechu	Pax Softnica	September 8, 2000	Unreleased	Unreleased	
Kaijin Zona	Vistec	October 21, 2000	Unreleased	Unreleased	
Mario Tennis	Camelot Software Planning	November 1, 2000	January 16, 2001	February 2, 2001	
Donkey Kong Country	Rare	January 21, 2001	November 20, 2000	November 17, 2000	
Kakurenbo Battle Monster Tactics	Spiral	November 21, 2000	Unreleased	Unreleased	
Pokémon Crystal Version	Game Freak	December 14, 2000	July 29, 2001	November 2, 2001	
Mobile Trainer	MissingLink	January 27, 2001	Unreleased	Unreleased	
The Legend of Zelda: Oracle of Ages	Capcom; Flagship	February 27, 2001	May 14, 2001	October 5, 2001	
The Legend of Zelda: Oracle of Seasons	Capcom; Flagship	February 27, 2001	May 14, 2001	October 5, 2001	
Pocket Soccer	Game-Play Studios	Unreleased	Unreleased	March 16, 2001	
Hamtaro: Ham-Hams Unite!	Pax Softnica	April 21, 2001	October 28, 2002	January 10, 2003	
Mobile Golf	Camelot Software Planning	May 11, 2001	Unreleased	Unreleased	
Game compilations
The Legend of Zelda: Oracle of Seasons and Oracle of Ages Limited Edition	Capcom, Flagship	Unreleased	Unreleased	2001	

The Pokémon Company-published titles (Note: The Pokémon Company is jointly owned by Nintendo, Game Freak, and Creatures.)
Title	Developer(s)	Release date		
Title	Developer(s)	JP	NA	PAL
Pokémon Card GB 2 GR-Dan Sanjō!	Hudson Soft, Creatures Inc.	March 28, 2001	Unreleased	Unreleased

Rare-published titles (Note: Rare was partially owned by Nintendo (49%) during this period, and its games typically displayed the Nintendo logo at startup.)
Title	Developer(s)	Release date			Ref.
Title	Developer(s)	JP	NA	PAL	Ref.
Conker's Pocket Tales (Note: Published by Rare and distributed exclusively by Nintendo Worldwide.)	Rare	Unreleased	June 8, 1999	July 1999	
Perfect Dark	Rare	Unreleased	August 28, 2000	September 1, 2000	

Licensed to Nintendo (Worldwide)
Title	Developer(s)	Licensor(s)	Release date			Ref.
Title	Developer(s)	Licensor(s)	JP	NA	PAL	Ref.
Tetris DX	Nintendo	Elorg	October 21, 1998	November 18, 1998	July 1, 1999	
Disney's Beauty and the Beast: A Board Game Adventure	Left Field Productions	Disney	Unreleased	October 25, 1999	December 1999	
Mickey's Racing Adventure	Rare	Disney	Unreleased	November 22, 1999	November 25, 1999	
Star Wars Episode I: Racer	Pax Softnica	LucasArts Entertainment Company, Lucasfilm	Unreleased	December 6, 1999	December 17, 1999	
The Little Mermaid II: Pinball Frenzy	Left Field Productions	Disney	Unreleased	September 24, 2000	March 16, 2001	
Alice in Wonderland	Digital Eclipse	Disney	Unreleased	October 4, 2000	April 20, 2001	
Mickey's Speedway USA	Rare	Disney	Unreleased	March 25, 2001	March 23, 2001	

Licensed to Nintendo (original release published by another company)
North America and PAL regions only
Title	Licensor(s)	Release date		Ref.
Title	Licensor(s)	NA	PAL	Ref.
Pocket Bomberman	Hudson Soft	November 18, 1998	1999	
Shadowgate Classic (Note: The Nintendo release is the original one. The game was later published by Kemco for the Japanese release.)	Kemco	January 1999	1999	
Bugs Bunny: Crazy Castle 3	Kemco	January 1999	1999	
R-Type DX (Note: The Nintendo release is the original one. The game was later licensed to and published by Epoch for the Japanese release.)	Irem	June 1999	July 20, 1999	
PAL regions only
Title	Licensor(s)	Release date		Ref.
Title	Licensor(s)	PAL		Ref.
Harvest Moon GB	Natsume Inc.	January 10, 1999		

Distributed exclusively by Nintendo label
Title	Publisher / Licensor(s)	Release date			Ref.
Title	Publisher / Licensor(s)	JP	NA	PAL	Ref.
Conker's Pocket Tales	Rare	Unreleased	June 8, 1999	July 1999	
F-1 World Grand Prix	Video System	Nintendo Power only	Unreleased	July 1999	
Perfect Dark	Rare	Unreleased	August 28, 2000	September 1, 2000	

=== Nintendo Power ===
Licenses owned or co-owned by Nintendo
Title	Developer(s)	Release date	Ref.
Title	Developer(s)	JP	Ref.
Game Boy Gallery 3	TOSE	March 1, 2000	
Super Mario Bros. Deluxe	Nintendo R&D2	March 1, 2000	
Zelda no Densetsu: Yume o Miru Shima DX	Nintendo EAD	March 1, 2000	
Balloon Fight GB	Nintendo R&D1, Pax Softnica	July 31, 2000 (Note: Pre-installed on a Nintendo Power cartridge.)	
Balloon Fight GB	Nintendo R&D1, Pax Softnica	August 1, 2000 (Note: Available through the standard service.)	

Licensed to Nintendo (Worldwide)
Title	Developer(s)	Licensor(s)	Release date	Ref.
Title	Developer(s)	Licensor(s)	JP	Ref.
Tetris Deluxe	Nintendo R&D1	Elorg	September 1, 2000	

== Game Boy Advance ==
Licenses owned or co-owned by Nintendo
Title	Developer(s)	Release date			Ref.
Title	Developer(s)	JP	NA	PAL	Ref.
F-Zero: Maximum Velocity	NDcube	March 21, 2001	June 11, 2001	June 22, 2001	
Kuru Kuru Kururin	Eighting	March 21, 2001	VC-only	June 22, 2001	
Napoleon (Note: The European release was titled L'Aigle de Guerre and only available in France.)	Genki	March 21, 2001	Unreleased	November 21, 2001	
Super Mario Advance	Nintendo R&D2	March 21, 2001	June 11, 2001	June 22, 2001	
Tactics Ogre: The Knight of Lodis (Note: Licensed to and published in North America by Atlus.)	Quest Corporation	June 21, 2001	May 11, 2002	Unreleased	
Mario Kart: Super Circuit	Intelligent Systems	July 21, 2001	August 27, 2001	September 14, 2001	
Golden Sun	Camelot Software Planning	August 1, 2001	November 11, 2001	February 22, 2002	
Wario Land 4	Nintendo R&D1	August 21, 2001	November 19, 2001	November 17, 2001	
Advance Wars	Intelligent Systems	Compilation only	September 10, 2001	January 11, 2002	
Dokodemo Taikyoku: Yakuman Advance	NDcube	October 26, 2001	Unreleased	Unreleased	
Magical Vacation	Brownie Brown	December 7, 2001	Unreleased	Unreleased	
Super Mario World: Super Mario Advance 2	Nintendo R&D2	December 14, 2001	February 11, 2002	April 12, 2002	
Tomato Adventure	AlphaDream	January 25, 2002	Unreleased	Unreleased	
Domo-Kun no Fushigi Terebi	Suzak	February 21, 2002	Unreleased	Unreleased	
Koro Koro Puzzle Happy Panechu!	Mobile21; Nintendo R&D2	March 8, 2002	Unreleased	Unreleased	
Fire Emblem: The Binding Blade	Intelligent Systems	March 29, 2002	Unreleased	Unreleased	
Hamtaro: Ham-Ham Heartbreak	Pax Softnica	May 31, 2002	April 8, 2003	June 27, 2003	
Golden Sun: The Lost Age	Camelot Software Planning	June 28, 2002	April 14, 2003	September 19, 2003	
Sakura Momoko no Ukiuki Carnival	Nintendo NSD, Indieszero	July 5, 2002	Unreleased	Unreleased	
Custom Robo GX	Noise	July 26, 2002	Unreleased	Unreleased	
Densetsu no Starfy	TOSE	September 6, 2002	NSO-only	NSO-only	
Yoshi's Island: Super Mario Advance 3	Nintendo R&D2	September 20, 2002	September 23, 2002	October 11, 2002	
Kirby: Nightmare in Dream Land	HAL Laboratory	October 25, 2002	December 2, 2002	September 26, 2003	
Game & Watch Gallery 4 (Note: Released as Game & Watch Gallery Advance in PAL regions.)	TOSE	VC-only	October 28, 2002	October 25, 2002	
Pokémon Ruby and Sapphire Version (Note: Published by The Pokémon Company in Japan.)	Game Freak	November 21, 2002	March 19, 2003	July 25, 2003	
Metroid Fusion	Nintendo R&D1	February 14, 2003	November 18, 2002	November 22, 2002	
The Legend of Zelda: A Link to the Past and Four Swords	Nintendo R&D2; Capcom; Flagship	March 14, 2003	December 2, 2002	March 28, 2003	
Kururin Paradise	Eighting	December 6, 2002	Unreleased	Unreleased	
WarioWare, Inc.: Mega Microgame$!	Nintendo R&D1	March 21, 2003	May 26, 2003	May 23, 2003	
Fire Emblem: The Blazing Blade	Intelligent Systems	April 24, 2003	November 3, 2003	July 16, 2004	
Hamtaro: Rainbow Rescue	AlphaDream, Graphic Research	May 23, 2003	Unreleased	October 29, 2004	
Donkey Kong Country	Rare	December 12, 2003	June 9, 2003	June 6, 2004	
Advance Wars 2: Black Hole Rising	Intelligent Systems	Compilation only	June 24, 2003	October 3, 2003	
Super Mario Advance 4: Super Mario Bros. 3	Nintendo R&D2	July 11, 2003	October 21, 2003	October 17, 2003	
Pokémon Pinball: Ruby & Sapphire	Jupiter	August 1, 2003	August 25, 2003	November 14, 2003	
Densetsu no Starfy 2	TOSE	September 5, 2003	NSO-only	NSO-only	
Mario & Luigi: Superstar Saga	AlphaDream	November 21, 2003	November 17, 2003	November 21, 2003	
F-Zero: GP Legend	Suzak	November 28, 2003	September 20, 2004	June 4, 2004	
Pokémon FireRed and LeafGreen Version	Game Freak	January 29, 2004	September 7, 2004	October 1, 2004	
Metroid: Zero Mission	Nintendo R&D1	May 27, 2004	February 9, 2004	April 8, 2004	
Kirby & The Amazing Mirror	HAL Laboratory, Flagship, Dimps	April 15, 2004	October 18, 2004	July 2, 2004	
Mario Golf: Advance Tour	Camelot Software Planning	April 22, 2004	June 22, 2004	September 17, 2004	
Mario vs. Donkey Kong	Nintendo Software Technology	June 10, 2004	May 24, 2004	November 19, 2004	
Game Boy Advance Video: Pokémon - For Ho-Oh the Bells Toll! and A Hot Water Battle	4Kids Technology, Inc.	Unreleased	June 21, 2004	June 9, 2005 (Note: PAL version only released in Australia.)	
Game Boy Advance Video: Pokémon - Johto Photo Finish and Playing with Fire!	4Kids Technology, Inc.	Unreleased	June 21, 2004	June 9, 2005	
Donkey Kong Country 2	Rare	July 1, 2004	November 15, 2004	June 25, 2004	
Hamtaro: Ham-Ham Games	AlphaDream	July 15, 2004	July 27, 2004	July 16, 2004	
Densetsu no Starfy 3	Tose, Nintendo SPD	August 5, 2004	NSO-only	NSO-only	
Mario Pinball Land	Fuse Games	August 26, 2004	October 4, 2004	November 26, 2004	
Pokémon Emerald Version	Game Freak	September 16, 2004	May 1, 2005	October 21, 2005	
Game Boy Advance Video: Pokémon - Beach Blank-out Blastoise and Go West Young Meowth	4Kids Technology, Inc.	Unreleased	September 27, 2004	June 9, 2005	
Game Boy Advance Video: Pokémon - I Choose You and Here Comes the Squirtle Squad	4Kids Technology, Inc.	Unreleased	September 27, 2004	June 9, 2005	
Fire Emblem: The Sacred Stones	Intelligent Systems	October 7, 2004	May 23, 2005	November 4, 2005	
WarioWare: Twisted!	Intelligent Systems Nintendo SPD	October 14, 2004	May 23, 2005	May 19, 2005	
F-Zero Climax	Suzak	October 21, 2004	NSO-only	NSO-only	
The Legend of Zelda: The Minish Cap	Capcom Flagship	November 4, 2004	January 10, 2005	November 12, 2004	
Yoshi Topsy-Turvy	Artoon	December 9, 2004	June 13, 2005	April 22, 2005	
Mario Party Advance	Hudson Soft	January 13, 2005	March 28, 2005	June 10, 2005	
DK: King of Swing	Paon	May 19, 2005	September 19, 2005	February 4, 2005	
Play-Yan	Nintendo	February 21, 2005	Unreleased	Unreleased	
Sennen Kazoku	indieszero	March 10, 2005	Unreleased	Unreleased	
The Tower SP	Vivarium	April 28, 2005	Co-own by Sega and Vivarium	Unreleased	
Nonono Puzzle Chai-Rian	Creatures Inc.	June 16, 2005	Unreleased	Unreleased	
Mario Tennis: Power Tour	Camelot Software Planning	September 13, 2005	December 5, 2005	November 18, 2005	
Nintendo MP3 Player	Nintendo	September 13, 2005	Unreleased	December 22, 2006	
Drill Dozer	Game Freak	September 22, 2005	February 6, 2006	VC-only	
Polarium Advance	Mitchell Corporation	October 13, 2005	November 13, 2006	March 31, 2006	
Donkey Kong Country 3	Rare	December 1, 2005	November 7, 2005	November 4, 2005	
Pokémon Mystery Dungeon: Red Rescue Team	Chunsoft	November 17, 2005	September 18, 2006	November 10, 2006	
Eyeshield 21: Devilbats Devildays	Eighting	April 6, 2006	Unreleased	Unreleased	
Mother 3	Brownie Brown, HAL Laboratory	April 20, 2006	Unreleased	Unreleased	
Calcio Bit	ParityBit	May 18, 2006	Unreleased	Unreleased	
Boundish	Skip Ltd.	July 13, 2006	Unreleased	Unreleased	
Dialhex	Skip Ltd.	July 13, 2006	Unreleased	Unreleased	
Dotstream	Skip Ltd.	July 13, 2006	Unreleased	Unreleased	
Coloris	Skip Ltd.	July 27, 2006	Unreleased	Unreleased	
Digidrive	Q-Games	July 27, 2006	Unreleased	Unreleased	
Orbital	Skip Ltd.	July 27, 2006	Unreleased	Unreleased	
Soundvoyager	Skip Ltd.	July 27, 2006	Unreleased	Unreleased	
Rhythm Tengoku	Nintendo SPD	August 3, 2006	Unreleased	Unreleased	
Game compilations
Mother 1+2 (Note: Never released individually on the Game Boy Advance.)	Pax Softnica	June 20, 2003	Unreleased	Unreleased	
Game Boy Wars Advance 1+2	Intelligent Systems	November 25, 2004	Unreleased	Unreleased	
Dr. Mario & Puzzle League	Tose	September 13, 2005	November 28, 2005	November 25, 2005	
Classic NES Series (Note: Known as Famicom Mini in Japan and NES Classics in Europe and Australia.)
Classic NES Series: Super Mario Bros.	Nintendo R&D4	February 14, 2004	June 7, 2004	July 9, 2004	
Classic NES Series: Donkey Kong	Nintendo R&D1, Nintendo R&D2	February 14, 2004	June 7, 2004	July 9, 2004	
Classic NES Series: Ice Climber	Nintendo R&D1	February 14, 2004	June 7, 2004	July 9, 2004	
Classic NES Series: Excitebike	Nintendo R&D4	February 14, 2004	June 7, 2004	July 9, 2004	
Classic NES Series: The Legend of Zelda	Nintendo R&D4	February 14, 2004	June 7, 2004	July 9, 2004	
Famicom Mini: Mario Bros.	Nintendo R&D2, Intelligent Systems	May 21, 2004	Unreleased	Unreleased	
Famicom Mini: Clu Clu Land	Nintendo R&D1	May 21, 2004	Unreleased	Unreleased	
Famicom Mini: Balloon Fight	Nintendo R&D1, HAL Laboratory	May 21, 2004	Unreleased	Unreleased	
Famicom Mini: Wrecking Crew	Nintendo R&D1	May 21, 2004	Unreleased	Unreleased	
Classic NES Series: Dr. Mario	Nintendo R&D1	May 21, 2004	October 25, 2004	January 7, 2005	
Famicom Mini: Super Mario Bros. 2	Nintendo R&D4	August 10, 2004	Unreleased	Unreleased	
Famicom Mini: Nazo no Murasamejō	Nintendo R&D4	August 10, 2004	Unreleased	Unreleased	
Classic NES Series: Metroid	Nintendo R&D1, Intelligent Systems	August 10, 2004	October 25, 2004	January 7, 2005	
Famicom Mini: Hikari Shinwa: Palutena no Kagame	Nintendo R&D1, Tose	August 10, 2004	Unreleased	Unreleased	
Classic NES Series: Zelda II: The Adventure of Link	Nintendo R&D4	August 10, 2004	October 25, 2004	January 7, 2005	
Famicom Mini: Famicom Mukashi Banashi: Shin Onigashima Zengo-hen	Nintendo R&D4, Pax Softnica	August 10, 2004	Unreleased	Unreleased	
Famicom Mini: Famicom Tantei Club: Kieta Kōkeisha Zengo-hen	Nintendo R&D1, Tose	August 10, 2004	Unreleased	Unreleased	
Famicom Mini: Famicom Tantei Club Part II: Ushiro ni Tatsu Shōjo Zengo-hen	Nintendo R&D1, Tose	August 10, 2004	Unreleased	Unreleased	

Title	Developer(s)	Licensor(s)	Release date			Ref.
Title	Developer(s)	Licensor(s)	JP	NA	PAL	Ref.
Disney's Magical Quest Starring Mickey & Minnie	Capcom, Nintendo	Disney	August 9, 2002	August 12, 2002	September 27, 2002	
Oriental Blue: Ao no Tengai	Hudson Soft	Hudson Soft, Red	October 24, 2003	Unreleased	Unreleased	
Classic NES Series (Note: Known as Famicom Mini in Japan and NES Classics in Europe and Australia.)
Classic NES Series: Pac-Man	Namco	Namco	February 14, 2004	June 7, 2004	July 9, 2004	
Classic NES Series: Xevious	Namco	Namco	February 14, 2004	June 7, 2004	July 9, 2004	
Famicom Mini: Mappy	Namco	Namco	February 14, 2004	Unreleased	Unreleased	
Classic NES Series: Bomberman	Hudson Soft	Hudson Soft	February 14, 2004	June 7, 2004	July 9, 2004	
Famicom Mini: Star Soldier	Hudson Soft	Hudson Soft	February 14, 2004	Unreleased	Unreleased	
Famicom Mini: Dig-Dug	Namco	Namco	May 21, 2004	Unreleased	Unreleased	
Famicom Mini: Takahashi Meijin no Bōken Jima	Hudson Soft	Hudson Soft	May 21, 2004	Unreleased	Unreleased	
Famicom Mini: Makaimura	Capcom, Micronics	Capcom	May 21, 2004	Unreleased	Unreleased	
Famicom Mini: TwinBee	Konami	Konami	May 21, 2004	Unreleased	Unreleased	
Famicom Mini: Ganbare Goemon! Karakuri Dōchū	Konami	Konami	May 21, 2004	Unreleased	Unreleased	
Classic NES Series: Castlevania	Konami	Konami	August 10, 2004	October 25, 2004	January 7, 2005	
Famicom Mini: SD Gundam World: Gachapon Senshi - Scramble Wars	Bandai	Bandai	August 10, 2004	Unreleased	Unreleased	

Licensed to Nintendo (original release published by another company)
North America and PAL regions only
Title	Licensor(s)	Release date		Ref.
Title	Licensor(s)	NA	PAL	Ref.
Top Gear Rally	Kemco	October 28, 2003	October 31, 2003	
Final Fantasy Tactics Advance	Square Enix	September 8, 2003	October 24, 2003	
Sword of Mana	Square Enix	December 1, 2003	March 18, 2004	
Final Fantasy I & II: Dawn of Souls	Square Enix	November 29, 2004	December 3, 2004	
Dynasty Warriors Advance	Koei	August 29, 2005	December 2, 2005	
Final Fantasy IV Advance	Square Enix	December 12, 2005	June 2, 2006	
Tales of Phantasia	Namco	March 6, 2006	March 31, 2006	
Final Fantasy V Advance	Square Enix	November 6, 2006	April 20, 2007	
Final Fantasy VI Advance	Square Enix	February 5, 2007	July 6, 2007	
PAL regions only
Title	Licensor(s)	Release date		Ref.
Title	Licensor(s)	PAL		Ref.
Kingdom Hearts: Chain of Memories	Square Enix	May 6, 2005		

Nintendo as distributor only (no involvement in licensing or publishing)
Spain only
Title	Licensor(s)	Release date	Ref.
Title	Licensor(s)	ESP	Ref.
W.I.T.C.H.	Disney Interactive Studios	October 7, 2005	
The Nightmare Before Christmas: The Pumpkin King	Buena Vista Games	October 7, 2005	
Disney's Kim Possible 2: Drakken's Demise	Buena Vista Games	March 10, 2006	
The Wild	Buena Vista Games	May 19, 2006	
Pirates of the Caribbean: Dead Man's Chest	Buena Vista Games	July 7, 2006	
Meet the Robinsons	Disney Interactive Studios	March 30, 2007	

=== e-Reader ===
Licenses owned or co-owned by Nintendo
Title	Developer(s)	Release date		Ref.
Title	Developer(s)	JP	NA	Ref.
Pokémon-e: Expedition Base Set (Note: Published by The Pokémon Company in Japan.)	Nintendo	December 1, 2001	September 15, 2002	
Animal Crossing-e Series 1	Nintendo	February 14, 2002	October 28, 2002	
Domokun no Card-e Winter Pack	Nintendo	February 21, 2002	Unreleased	
Pokémon-e: Aquapolis (The Town on No Map)	Nintendo	March 8, 2002	January 15, 2003	
E3 2002 Promo Pack (Note: This pack contained two cards from the Pokémon-e: Expedition Base Set (Pichu and Hoppip), along with Game & Watch Collection: Manhole-e and a Kirby Contest Card.)	Nintendo	Unreleased	May 22, 2002	
Pokémon-e: Aquapolis (Wind from the Sea)	Nintendo	May 24, 2002	January 15, 2003	
Theater Limited VS Pack (Note: Not only e-Reader cards.)	Nintendo	July 13, 2002	Unreleased	
Pokémon-e: Skyridge (Split Earth)	Nintendo	August 23, 2002	May 12, 2003	
Game & Watch Collection: Manhole-e (Note: Two versions of the card were produced: one given away in the E3 2002 Promo Pack, and one packaged with North American every e-Reader.)	Nintendo	June 27, 2003	September 16, 2002	
Air Hockey-e (Note: Promotional card released with the North American launch of the e-Reader, available at select retailers. It was later packaged with the Australian version of the e-Reader.)	Nintendo	Unreleased	September 16, 2002	
Balloon Fight-e	Nintendo R&D1, HAL Laboratory	Unreleased	September 16, 2002	
Donkey Kong Jr.-e	Nintendo R&D1, Nintendo R&D2	Unreleased	September 16, 2002	
Excitebike-e	Nintendo R&D4	Unreleased	September 16, 2002	
Pinball-e	Nintendo R&D1, HAL Laboratory	Unreleased	September 16, 2002	
Tennis-e	Nintendo R&D1, Intelligent Systems	Unreleased	September 16, 2002	
Pokémon-e: Skyridge (Mysterious Mountains)	Nintendo	October 4, 2002	May 12, 2003	
Animal Crossing-e Series 2	Nintendo	2002	January 21, 2003	
Animal Crossing-e Series 3	Nintendo	2002	March 11, 2003	
Animal Crossing-e Series 4	Nintendo	October 18, 2002	May 5, 2003	
Baseball-e	Nintendo R&D1	Unreleased	November 12, 2002	
Donkey Kong-e	Nintendo R&D1, Nintendo R&D2	Unreleased	November 12, 2002	
Ice Climber-e	Nintendo R&D1	Unreleased	November 12, 2002	
Mario Bros.-e	Nintendo R&D2, Intelligent Systems	Unreleased	November 12, 2002	
Urban Champion-e	Nintendo R&D1	Unreleased	November 12, 2002	
Hamtaro Card-e	Nintendo	January 31, 2003	Unreleased	
Mario Party-e (Note: A promotional "Two Coin Card" was distributed with GamePro magazine.)	Nintendo	Unreleased	February 17, 2003	
Wizards Black Star Promos (Note: This is a promotional Pokémon card series distributed at various events from July 1999 to March 2003. Only a few of these cards are e-Reader compatible.)	Nintendo	Unreleased	March 2003	
Clu Clu Land-e	Nintendo R&D1	Unreleased	April 21, 2003	
Donkey Kong 3-e	Nintendo R&D1, Intelligent Systems	Unreleased	April 21, 2003	
Golf-e	Nintendo R&D2, HAL Laboratory	Unreleased	April 21, 2003	
Eon Ticket e-Card (Note: Promotional Pokémon Ruby or Sapphire e-Card, distributed at E3 2003, in Nintendo Power Vol. 173 (November 2003), and for a limited time at Toys "R" Us stores.)	Nintendo	Unreleased	May 14, 2003	
Pokémon-e TCG: EX Ruby & Sapphire (Note: Pokémon Trading Card Game packs.)	Nintendo	Not compatible with e-Readers	June 18, 2003	
Pokémon Battle-e Series 1 (Note: Available in six packs :Iron Defense, Solid Armor, Freezing Ray, Seizing Poison, Hidden Ruins and Cordial Bond.)	Nintendo	June 27, 2003	October 21, 2003	
Super Mario Advance 4: Super Mario Bros. 3-e Series 1 (Note: Two exclusive e-Reader cards were included with the Japanese and North American releases of Super Mario Advance 4: Super Mario Bros. 3. A special Wal-Mart–exclusive North American edition featured seven cards. In Japan, three additional cards were distributed as magazine bonuses in CoroCoro Comic (October 2003, February 2004, and September 2003 issues).)	Nintendo	July 11, 2003	October 21, 2003	
Pokémon Channel-e (Note: Bundled exclusively with early releases of Pokémon Channel in North America, Japan, and Australia.)	Nintendo	July 18, 2003	December 1, 2003	
Pokémon-e TCG: EX Sandstorm	Nintendo	Not compatible with e-Readers	September 18, 2003	
Super Mario Advance 4: Super Mario Bros. 3-e Series 2	Nintendo	February 12, 2004	October 21, 2003	
Nintendo Black Star Promos (Note: This is a promotional Pokémon card series distributed at various events from October 2003 to September 2006. Only a few of these cards are e-Reader compatible.)	Nintendo	Unreleased	October 2003	
Pokémon-e TCG: EX Dragon	Nintendo	Not compatible with e-Readers	November 24, 2003	
Kirby's Slide Puzzle (Note: Distributed with FoxBox promotional boxes at Toys'R Us in November 2003, and in issue 175 of Nintendo Power and in an issue of Tips & Tricks Magazine in December 2003.)	Nintendo	Unreleased	November 2003	
F-Zero: Falcon Densetsu Card-e+	Nintendo	January 26, 2004	Unreleased	
Pokémon-e TCG: EX Team Magma vs Team Aqua	Nintendo	Not compatible with e-Readers	March 15, 2004	
Pikmin Puzzle Card e+ Series 1 (Note: Promotional cards were also distributed. Three cards were offered with the purchase of the game, along with six cards as Club Nintendo prizes, one card included as a supplement to the Pikmin 2: Treasure Collection Guide, and two Famitsu magazine bonus cards.)	Nintendo	April 29, 2004	Unreleased	
Mario vs. Donkey Kong-e (Card 1) (Note: Given to attendees of the 20th Next Generation World Hobby Fair.)	Nintendo	June 2004	Unreleased	
Mario vs. Donkey Kong-e (Card 2-5) (Note: Distributed as a set in a sweepstakes in the August 2004 issue of Monthly CoroCoro Comic.)	Nintendo	July 15, 2004	Unreleased	
Pikmin Puzzle Card e+ Series 2	Nintendo	July 29, 2004	Unreleased	
Prize games
Nickelodeon Kids' Choice Awards 2003	Nintendo	Unreleased	2003	

The Pokémon Company-published titles (Note: The Pokémon Company is jointly owned by Nintendo, Game Freak, and Creatures.)
Title	Developer(s)	Release date		Ref.
Title	Developer(s)	JP	NA	Ref.
Pokémon-e Starter Deck	Nintendo	December 1, 2001	Unreleased	
McDonald's Pokémon-e Minimum Pack	Nintendo	January 26, 2002	Unreleased	
P Promotional cards (Note: This is a promotional Pokémon card series distributed at various events from July 2001 to July 2002. Only a few of these cards are e-Reader compatible.)	Nintendo	July 2002	Unreleased	
T Promotional cards (Note: This is a promotional Pokémon card series distributed at various events from January 2002 to March 2003. Only a few of these cards are e-Reader compatible.)	Nintendo	March 2003	Unreleased	
Pokémon Pinball: Ruby & Sapphire e-Reader cards (Note: Three exclusive cards were distributed to players who purchased the game at Pokémon Centers. Another card was included in the Summer 2003 issue of Pokémon Scoop, and an additional demo card was made available in select stores across Japan throughout September 2003.)	Nintendo	August 1, 2003	Unreleased	
Pokémon Battle-e Series 2 (Note: Available in six packs :Sharp Claw, Cursed Showdown, Reversal Blow, Battle without Conclusion, Self-Confidence not Wasted and Steady Power.)	Nintendo	October 17, 2003	Unreleased	
Pokémon Colosseum Double Battle-e (Note: Available in four packs :Red, Blue, Yellow and Green pack.)	Nintendo	December 25, 2003	Unreleased	
Berry Problem Repair Program (Note: Distributed with Pokémon Scoop's Winter 2004 issue.)	Nintendo	January 18, 2004	Unreleased	
Pokémon Battle-e FireRed & LeafGreen	Nintendo	April 15, 2004	Unreleased	
Pokémon Battle-e Emerald	Nintendo	October 7, 2004	Unreleased	

== Pokémon Mini ==
Licenses co-owned by Nintendo
Title	Developer(s)	Licensors	Release date			Ref.
Title	Developer(s)	Licensors	JP	NA	PAL	Ref.
Pokémon Party mini (Note: Bundled with Pokémon Mini console.) (Note: Published by The Pokémon Company in Japan.)	Denyusha	Nintendo, Creatures Inc., Game Freak	December 14, 2001	November 16, 2001	March 15, 2002	
Pokémon Pinball mini	Jupiter Corporation	Nintendo, Creatures Inc., Game Freak	December 14, 2001	November 16, 2001	March 15, 2002	
Pokémon Puzzle Collection	Jupiter Corporation	Nintendo, Creatures Inc., Game Freak	December 14, 2001	November 16, 2001	March 15, 2002	
Pokémon Zany Cards	Denyusha	Nintendo, Creatures Inc., Game Freak	December 14, 2001	November 16, 2001	March 15, 2002	
Pokémon Shock Tetris	Nintendo	Nintendo, Creatures Inc., Game Freak, Elorg	March 21, 2002	Unreleased	September 2002	

The Pokémon Company-published titles (Note: The Pokémon Company is jointly owned by Nintendo, Game Freak, and Creatures.)
Title	Developer(s)	Release date			Ref.
Title	Developer(s)	JP	NA	PAL	Ref.
Pokémon Puzzle Collection vol. 2	Jupiter Corporation	April 26, 2002	Unreleased	Unreleased	
Pokémon Race mini	Jupiter Corporation	July 19, 2002	Unreleased	Unreleased	
Pichu Bros. mini	Denyusha	August 9, 2002	Unreleased	Unreleased	
Togepi no Daibōken	Jupiter Corporation	October 18, 2002	Unreleased	Unreleased	
Pokémon Sodateyasan mini	Jupiter Corporation	December 14, 2002	Unreleased	Unreleased	

== Nintendo DS ==
Licenses owned or co-owned by Nintendo
Title	Developer(s)	Release date				Ref.
Title	Developer(s)	JP	NA	PAL	KOR	Ref.
PictoChat (Note: Preloaded on the Nintendo DS, Nintendo DS Lite and Nintendo DSi.)	Nintendo	December 2, 2004	November 21, 2004	March 11, 2005	January 18, 2007	
Super Mario 64 DS	Nintendo EAD	December 2, 2004	November 21, 2004	March 11, 2005	July 26, 2007	
Metroid Prime Hunters: First Hunt	Nintendo Software Technology	Unreleased	November 21, 2004	March 11, 2005	Unreleased	
Pokémon Dash (Note: Published by The Pokémon Company in Japan.)	Ambrella	December 2, 2004	March 14, 2005	March 11, 2005	March 22, 2007	
Polarium	Mitchell Corporation	December 2, 2004	April 18, 2005	March 11, 2005	Unreleased	
Daigasso! Band Brothers	Nintendo R&D2 Nintendo SPD	December 2, 2004	Unreleased	Unreleased	Unreleased	
WarioWare: Touched!	Intelligent Systems Nintendo SPD	December 2, 2004	February 14, 2005	March 11, 2005	June 14, 2007	
Yoshi Touch & Go	Nintendo EAD	January 27, 2005	March 14, 2005	May 6, 2005	Unreleased	
Trace Memory (Note: Released as Another Code: Futatsu no Kioku in Japan, and Another Code: Two Memories in Europe and Australia.)	Cing	February 24, 2005	September 27, 2005	June 24, 2005	Unreleased	
Kirby: Canvas Curse	HAL Laboratory	March 24, 2005	June 13, 2005	November 25, 2005	Unreleased	
Yakuman DS	Nintendo SPD	March 31, 2005	Unreleased	Unreleased	Unreleased	
Advance Wars: Dual Strike	Intelligent Systems	June 23, 2005	August 22, 2005	September 30, 2005	Unreleased	
Osu! Tatakae! Ōendan	iNiS	July 28, 2005	Unreleased	Unreleased	Unreleased	
Jump Super Stars	Ganbarion	August 8, 2005	Unreleased	Unreleased	Unreleased	
Daigasso! Band Brothers Tsuika Kyoku Cartridge	Nintendo R&D2, Nintendo SPD	September 26, 2005	Unreleased	Unreleased	Unreleased	
Pokémon Trozei!	Genius Sonority	October 20, 2005	March 6, 2006	May 5, 2006	May 15, 2007	
Super Princess Peach	Tose	October 20, 2005	February 27, 2006	May 26, 2006	Unreleased	
Metroid Prime Pinball	Fuse Games	January 19, 2006	October 24, 2005	June 22, 2007	Unreleased	
True Swing Golf	T&E Soft	November 10, 2005	January 23, 2006	November 25, 2005	Unreleased	
Mario Kart DS	Nintendo EAD	December 8, 2005	November 14, 2005	November 25, 2005	April 5, 2007	
Pokémon Mystery Dungeon: Blue Rescue Team	Chunsoft	November 17, 2005	September 18, 2006	November 10, 2006	August 30, 2007	
Animal Crossing: Wild World	Nintendo EAD	November 23, 2005	December 5, 2005	March 31, 2006	December 6, 2007	
Mario & Luigi: Partners in Time	AlphaDream	December 29, 2005	November 28, 2005	January 27, 2006	July 8, 2010	
Tottoko Hamtaro Nazonazo Q: Kumo no Ue no Hatena-jō	AlphaDream	December 1, 2005	Unreleased	Unreleased	Unreleased	
Eyeshield 21: Max Devil Power	Eighting	February 2, 2006	Unreleased	Unreleased	Unreleased	
Magnetica	Mitchell Corporation	March 2, 2006	June 5, 2006	January 6, 2007	Unreleased	
Metroid Prime Hunters	Nintendo Software Technology	June 1, 2006	March 20, 2006	May 5, 2006	December 6, 2007	
Tetris DS	Nintendo SPD	April 27, 2006	March 20, 2006	April 21, 2006	July 7, 2007	
Pokémon Ranger	HAL Laboratory, Creatures Inc.	March 23, 2006	October 30, 2006	April 13, 2007	Unreleased	
Densetsu no Starfy 4	TOSE	April 13, 2006	Unreleased	Unreleased	Unreleased	
New Super Mario Bros.	Nintendo EAD	May 25, 2006	May 15, 2006	June 30, 2006	March 8, 2007	
Mawashite Tsunageru Touch Panic	Aki Corp.	May 25, 2006	Unreleased	Unreleased	Unreleased	
Magical Starsign	Brownie Brown	June 22, 2006	October 23, 2006	February 9, 2007	Unreleased	
Project Hacker: Kakusei	Red Entertainment	July 13, 2006	Unreleased	Unreleased	Unreleased	
Nintendo DS Browser (Note: Two versions were released on the same day: one compatible only with the Nintendo DS Lite, and one for the original model.)	Opera Software Nintendo	July 24, 2006	June 4, 2007	October 6, 2006	Unreleased	
Mario Hoops 3-on-3	Square Enix	July 27, 2006	September 11, 2006	February 16, 2007	Unreleased	
Game & Watch Collection (Note: Only available through Club Nintendo.)	Nintendo	July 28, 2006	December 15, 2008	November 12, 2009	Unreleased	
Star Fox Command	Q-Games, Nintendo EAD	August 3, 2006	August 28, 2006	January 26, 2007	Unreleased	
Chōsōjū Mecha MG	SANDLOT	September 2, 2006	Unreleased	Unreleased	Unreleased	
Freshly-Picked Tingle's Rosy Rupeeland	Vanpool	September 2, 2006	Unreleased	September 14, 2007	Unreleased	
Wi-Fi Taiō Yakuman DS	Nintendo SPD	September 14, 2006	Unreleased	Unreleased	Unreleased	
Mario vs. Donkey Kong 2: March of the Minis	Nintendo Software Technology	April 12, 2007	September 25, 2006	March 9, 2007	Unreleased	
Pokémon Diamond and Pearl Version	Game Freak	September 28, 2006	April 22, 2007	July 27, 2007	February 14, 2008	
Custom Robo Arena	Noise	October 19, 2006	March 19, 2007	May 25, 2007	Unreleased	
Kirby: Squeak Squad	HAL Laboratory, Flagship	November 2, 2006	December 4, 2006	June 22, 2007	September 13, 2007	
Elite Beat Agents	iNiS	Unreleased	November 6, 2006	July 13, 2007	October 11, 2007	
Yoshi's Island DS	Artoon	March 8, 2007	November 13, 2006	December 1, 2006	November 8, 2007	
Master of Illusion	Tenyo, 8ing	November 16, 2006	November 26, 2007	March 14, 2008	Unreleased	
Jump Ultimate Stars	Ganbarion	November 23, 2006	Unreleased	Unreleased	Unreleased	
Wario: Master of Disguise	Suzak	January 18, 2007	March 5, 2007	June 1, 2007	Unreleased	
Hotel Dusk: Room 215	Cing	January 25, 2007	January 22, 2007	April 13, 2007	February 12, 2009	
Diddy Kong Racing DS	Rare	Unreleased	February 5, 2007	April 20, 2007	Unreleased	
Jet Impulse	Nintendo EAD	February 8, 2007	Unreleased	Unreleased	Unreleased	
Tingle's Balloon Fight	Tose	April 12, 2007	Unreleased	Unreleased	Unreleased	
Planet Puzzle League	Intelligent Systems	April 26, 2007	June 4, 2007	June 29, 2007	Unreleased	
Moero! Nekketsu Rhythm Damashii Osu! Tatakae! Ōendan 2	iNiS	May 17, 2007	Unreleased	Unreleased	Unreleased	
Kurikin Nano Island Story	Media Kite	May 24, 2007	Unreleased	Unreleased	Unreleased	
Sūjin Taisen	Mitchell Corporation	June 7, 2007	Unreleased	Unreleased	Unreleased	
The Legend of Zelda: Phantom Hourglass	Nintendo EAD	June 23, 2007	October 1, 2007	October 19, 2007	April 3, 2008	
Chibi-Robo! Park Patrol	Skip Ltd.	July 5, 2007	October 2, 2007	March 20, 2008 (Note: Released only in Australia.)	Unreleased	
Slide Adventure MAGKID	Nintendo NSD	August 2, 2007	Unreleased	Unreleased	Unreleased	
DK Jungle Climber	Paon	August 9, 2007	September 10, 2007	October 12, 2007	Unreleased	
Theta	Vitei	September 6, 2007	Unreleased	Unreleased	Unreleased	
Zekkyō Senshi Sakeburein	Suzak	September 11, 2007	Unreleased	Unreleased	Unreleased	
Pokémon Mystery Dungeon: Explorers of Darkness and Explorers of Time	Chunsoft	September 13, 2007	April 20, 2008	July 4, 2008	December 11, 2008	
ASH: Archaic Sealed Heat	Mistwalker, Racjin	October 4, 2007	Unreleased	Unreleased	Unreleased	
Make 10: A Journey of Numbers	Muu Muu	October 10, 2007	Unreleased	September 26, 2008	Unreleased	
Mario Party DS	Hudson Soft	November 8, 2007	November 19, 2007	November 23, 2007	May 22, 2008	
1seg Jushin Adapter DS TV (Note: Includes ports of the Game & Watch titles Fire and Lion.)	Nintendo SPD	November 20, 2007	Unreleased	Unreleased	Unreleased	
Kōsoku Card Battle: Card Hero	Intelligent Systems, Nintendo SPD	December 20, 2007	Unreleased	Unreleased	Unreleased	
Mario & Sonic at the Olympic Games (Note: Published by Sega in North America and PAL regions.)	Sega Sports R&D	January 17, 2008	January 22, 2008	February 8, 2008	June 26, 2008	
Advance Wars: Days of Ruin	Intelligent Systems	3DS eShop only	January 21, 2008	January 25, 2008	Unreleased	
Soma Bringer	Monolith Soft	February 28, 2008	Unreleased	Unreleased	Unreleased	
Pokémon Ranger: Shadows of Almia	Creatures Inc.	March 20, 2008	November 10, 2008	November 21, 2008	Unreleased	
Fossil Fighters	Nintendo SPD, Red Entertainment, M2, Artdink	April 17, 2008	August 10, 2009	September 17, 2009	Unreleased	
Glory of Heracles	Paon, Studio Saizensen	May 22, 2008	January 18, 2010	Unreleased	Unreleased	
The Legendary Starfy	TOSE	July 10, 2008	June 8, 2009	October 8, 2009	Unreleased	
Jam with the Band	Nintendo SPD	June 26, 2008	Unreleased	May 21, 2010	Unreleased	
Rhythm Heaven	Nintendo SPD, TNX Music Recordings	July 31, 2008	April 5, 2009	May 1, 2009	September 24, 2009	
Fire Emblem: Shadow Dragon	Intelligent Systems	August 7, 2008	February 16, 2009	December 5, 2008	Unreleased	
Game & Watch Collection 2	Nintendo	September 5, 2008	March 31, 2010	2010	Unreleased	
Pokémon Platinum Version	Game Freak	September 13, 2008	March 22, 2009	May 22, 2009	July 2, 2009	
Kirby Super Star Ultra	HAL Laboratory	November 6, 2008	September 22, 2008	September 18, 2009	November 13, 2008	
DS Bitamin Widaehan Bapsang Malhaneun! Geongang-yori Giljabi	SKONEC Entertainment	Unreleased	Unreleased	Unreleased	October 16, 2008	
Style Savvy	syn Sophia, Nintendo SPD	October 23, 2008	November 2, 2009	October 23, 2009	September 16, 2010	
Mario & Luigi: Bowser's Inside Story	AlphaDream	February 11, 2009	September 14, 2009	October 9, 2009	July 21, 2011	
Picross 3D	HAL Laboratory	March 12, 2009	May 3, 2010	March 5, 2010	Unreleased	
Mabeop Cheonjamun DS	SKONEC Entertainment	Unreleased	Unreleased	Unreleased	April 16, 2009	
Pokémon Mystery Dungeon: Explorers of Sky	Chunsoft	April 18, 2009	October 12, 2009	November 20, 2009	Unreleased	
WarioWare D.I.Y.	Intelligent Systems, Nintendo SPD	April 29, 2009	March 28, 2010	April 30, 2010	Unreleased	
Tomodachi Collection	Nintendo SPD	June 18, 2009	Unreleased	Unreleased	Unreleased	
Okaeri! Chibi-Robo! Happy Richie Ōsōji!	Skip Ltd.	July 23, 2009	Unreleased	Unreleased	Unreleased	
Irozuki Tingle no Koi no Balloon Trip	Vanpool	August 6, 2009	Unreleased	Unreleased	Unreleased	
Pokémon HeartGold and SoulSilver Version	Game Freak	September 12, 2009	March 14, 2010	March 26, 2010	February 4, 2010	
Mario & Sonic at the Olympic Winter Games	Sega Sports R&D	November 19, 2009	October 13, 2009	October 16, 2009	December 3, 2009	
The Legend of Zelda: Spirit Tracks	Nintendo EAD	December 23, 2009	December 7, 2009	December 11, 2009	Unreleased	
Last Window: The Secret of Cape West	Cing	January 14, 2010	Unreleased	September 17, 2010	Unreleased	
Otona no Renai Shōsetsu: Harlequin Selection	Genius Sonority	February 25, 2010	Unreleased	Unreleased	Unreleased	
Pokémon Ranger: Guardian Signs	Creatures Inc.	March 6, 2010	October 4, 2010	November 5, 2010	Unreleased	
Art Academy	Headstrong Games, Nintendo SPD	June 19, 2010	October 25, 2010	August 6, 2010	October 14, 2010	
Fire Emblem: Shin Monshō no Nazo ~Hikari to Kage no Eiyū~	Intelligent Systems	July 15, 2010	Unreleased	Unreleased	Unreleased	
Pokémon Black and White Version	Game Freak	September 18, 2010	March 6, 2011	March 4, 2011	April, 21, 2011	
Golden Sun: Dark Dawn	Camelot Software Planning	October 28, 2010	November 29, 2010	December 10, 2010	Unreleased	
Mario vs. Donkey Kong: Mini-Land Mayhem!	Nintendo Software Technology	December 2, 2010	November 14, 2010	February 4, 2011	Unreleased	
Fossil Fighters: Champions	Nintendo SPD, Red Entertainment, M2, Artdink	November 18, 2010	November 14, 2011	Unreleased	Unreleased	
Eigo de Tabisuru: Little Charo	Jupiter	January 20, 2011	Unreleased	Unreleased	Unreleased	
Mabeop Cheonjamun DS 2: Choehoui Hanjamabeop	SKONEC Entertainment	Unreleased	Unreleased	Unreleased	January 27, 2011	
Learn with Pokémon: Typing Adventure	Genius Sonority	April 21, 2011	Unreleased	September 21, 2012	Unreleased	
Kirby Mass Attack	HAL Laboratory	August 4, 2011	September 19, 2011	October 28, 2011	December 1, 2011	
Pokémon Conquest	Koei Tecmo Games	March 17, 2012	June 18, 2012	July 27, 2012	Unreleased	
Kuruma de DS	Nintendo	June 1, 2012	Unreleased	Unreleased	Unreleased	
Pokémon Black and White Version 2	Game Freak	June 23, 2012	October 7, 2012	October 12, 2012	November 8, 2012	
Touch! Generations (Note: Software not considered as part of Touch! Generations in at least one country is excluded.)
Electroplankton	indieszero	April 7, 2005	January 9, 2006	July 7, 2006	Unreleased	
Nintendogs: Chihuahua & Friends	Nintendo EAD	April 21, 2005	August 22, 2005	October 7, 2005	May 3, 2007	
Nintendogs: Dachshund & Friends	Nintendo EAD	April 21, 2005	August 22, 2005	October 7, 2005	May 3, 2007	
Nintendogs: Lab & Friends (Note: Released as Shiba & Friends in Japan.)	Nintendo EAD	April 21, 2005	August 22, 2005	October 7, 2005	May 3, 2007	
Brain Age: Train Your Brain in Minutes a Day!	Nintendo SPD	May 19, 2005	April 17, 2006	June 9, 2006	January 18, 2007	
DS Rakubiki Jiten	Nintendo	June 16, 2005	Unreleased	Unreleased	Unreleased	
Big Brain Academy	Nintendo EAD	June 30, 2005	June 5, 2006	July 7, 2006	August 2, 2007	
Nintendogs: Best Friends	Nintendo EAD	Unreleased	October 24, 2005	Unreleased	Unreleased	
Daredemo Asobi Taizen	Agenda	November 3, 2005	Unreleased	Unreleased	Unreleased	
Brain Age 2: More Training in Minutes a Day!	Nintendo SPD	December 29, 2005	August 20, 2007	June 29, 2007	August 2, 2008	
English Training: Have Fun Improving Your Skills!	Plato	January 26, 2006	Unreleased	October 27, 2006	January 18, 2007	
Kanji Sonomama Rakubiki Jiten DS	Nintendo Software Development and Design, Intelligent Systems	April 13, 2006	Unreleased	Unreleased	Unreleased	
Tabi no Yubisashi Kaiwachō DS: DS Series 1 Thai	TOSE	April 20, 2006	Unreleased	Unreleased	Unreleased	
Tabi no Yubisashi Kaiwachō DS: DS Series 2 Chūgoku	Tose	April 20, 2006	Unreleased	Unreleased	Unreleased	
Tabi no Yubisashi Kaiwachō DS: DS Series 3 Kankoku	Tose	April 20, 2006	Unreleased	Unreleased	Unreleased	
Tabi no Yubisashi Kaiwachō DS: DS Series 4 America	Tose	April 27, 2006	Unreleased	Unreleased	Unreleased	
Tabi no Yubisashi Kaiwachō DS: DS Series 5 Deutsch	Tose	April 27, 2006	Unreleased	Unreleased	Unreleased	
Nintendogs: Dalmatian & Friends	Nintendo EAD	Unreleased	October 16, 2006	June 16, 2006	Unreleased	
Shaberu! DS Oryōri Navi	indieszero	July 20, 2006	Unreleased	Unreleased	Unreleased	
Clubhouse Games (Note: Released as Wi-Fi taiō Sekai no Dare demo Asobi Taizen in Japan, and 42 All-Time Classics in Europe.)	Agenda	April 19, 2007	October 9, 2006	September 29, 2006	Unreleased	
Otona no Jōshikiryoku Training DS	HAL Laboratory	October 26, 2006	Unreleased	Unreleased	Unreleased	
Kenkō Ōen Recipe 1000: DS Kondate Zenshū	Nintendo SPD	December 7, 2006	Unreleased	Unreleased	Unreleased	
Touch de Tanoshimu Hyakunin Isshu: DS Shigureden	Nintendo	December 14, 2006	Unreleased	Unreleased	Unreleased	
Picross DS	Jupiter	January 25, 2007	July 30, 2007	May 11, 2007	September 20, 2007	
Practise English!	Plato	March 29, 2007	Unreleased	October 26, 2007	November 26, 2007	
Flash Focus: Vision Training in Minutes a Day	Namco Bandai, Nintendo SPD	May 31, 2007	October 15, 2007	November 23, 2007	January 24, 2008	
Ganbaru Watashi no Kakei Diary	syn Sophia	July 12, 2007	Unreleased	Unreleased	Unreleased	
Face Training	Intelligent Systems	August 2, 2007	Unreleased	September 24, 2010	Unreleased	
DS Bungaku Zenshū	Genius Sonority	October 18, 2007	Unreleased	Unreleased	Unreleased	
DS Bimoji Training	indieszero	March 13, 2008	Unreleased	Unreleased	Unreleased	
CrossworDS	Nuevo Retro Games, Nintendo Software Technology	Unreleased	May 5, 2008	June 12, 2008	Unreleased	
Personal Trainer: Cooking	indieszero, Nintendo NSD	December 4, 2008	November 24, 2008	June 20, 2008	Unreleased	
Personal Trainer: Walking	Nintendo NSD, Creatures Inc.	November 1, 2008	May 26, 2009	June 5, 2009	Unreleased	
100 Classic Book Collection (Note: 10 extra Books can be downloaded via Nintendo Wi-Fi Connection.)	Genius Sonority	Unreleased	Unreleased	December 26, 2008	Unreleased	
DS Uranai Seikatsu	Jamworks	January 15, 2009	Unreleased	Unreleased	Unreleased	
Active Health with Carol Vorderman	Fuse Games Limited	Unreleased	Unreleased	August 7, 2009	Unreleased	
Mono ya Okane no Shikumi DS	Nintendo	August 27, 2009	Unreleased	Unreleased	Unreleased	
Nintendo Presents: Crossword Collection	Nintendo	Unreleased	Unreleased	December 18, 2009	Unreleased	
100 Livres Classiques	Genius Sonority	Unreleased	Unreleased	March 5, 2010 (Note: Released only in France.)	Unreleased	
Bibliothek der klassischen Bücher	Genius Sonority	Unreleased	Unreleased	March 5, 2010 (Note: Released only in Germany.)	Unreleased	
America's Test Kitchen: Let's Get Cooking	indieszero	Unreleased	March 28, 2010	Unreleased	Unreleased	
100 Classic Books	Genius Sonority	Unreleased	June 14, 2010	Unreleased	Unreleased	
1000 Cooking Recipes from Elle à Table	Agenda	Unreleased	Unreleased	July 2, 2010	Unreleased	

The Pokémon Company-published titles (Note: The Pokémon Company is jointly owned by Nintendo, Game Freak, and Creatures.)
Title	Developer(s)	Release date			
Title	Developer(s)	JP	NA	PAL	KOR
Pokémon Card Game Asobi Kata DS	Zener Works, Creatures Inc.	August 5, 2011	Unreleased	Unreleased	Unreleased

Licensed to Nintendo (Worldwide)
Title	Developer(s)	Licensor(s)	Release date				Ref.
Title	Developer(s)	Licensor(s)	JP	NA	PAL	KOR	Ref.
Mystery Case Files: MillionHeir	Big Fish Games, Griptonite Games	Big Fish Games	Unreleased	September 8, 2008	February 6, 2009	Unreleased	

Licensed to Nintendo (original release published by another company)
North America, PAL regions and South Korea only
Title	Licensor(s)	Release date			Ref.
Title	Licensor(s)	NA	PAL	KOR	Ref.
Sudoku Gridmaster	Hudson Soft	June 26, 2006	October 27, 2006	May 8, 2008	
Professor Layton and the Curious Village	Level-5	February 10, 2008	November 7, 2008	September 11, 2008	
Professor Layton and the Diabolical Box	Level-5	August 24, 2009	September 25, 2009	September 8, 2011	
North America and PAL regions only
Title	Licensor(s)	Release date			Ref.
Title	Licensor(s)	NA		PAL	Ref.
Meteos	Q Entertainment/Bandai	June 27, 2005		September 23, 2005	
Tenchu: Dark Secret	From Software	August 21, 2006		November 24, 2006	
Children of Mana	Square Enix	October 30, 2006		January 12, 2007	
Personal Trainer: Math	Hideo Kageyama, Shogakukan	January 12, 2009		February 8, 2008	
Dragon Quest IX: Sentinels of the Starry Skies	Square Enix	July 11, 2010		July 23, 2010	
Professor Layton and the Unwound Future	Level-5	September 12, 2010		October 22, 2010	
Dragon Quest VI: Realms of Revelation	Square Enix	February 14, 2011		May 20, 2011	
Dragon Quest Monsters: Joker 2	Square Enix	September 19, 2011		October 7, 2011	
Professor Layton and the Last Specter	Level-5	October 17, 2011		November 25, 2011	
PAL regions only
Title	Licensor(s)	Release date			Ref.
Title	Licensor(s)	PAL			Ref.
Ridge Racer DS	Namco	June 3, 2005			
Trauma Center: Under the Knife	Atlus	April 28, 2006			
Etrian Odyssey	Atlus	June 6, 2008			
Rooms: The Main Building	Hudson Soft	June 4, 2010			
Inazuma Eleven	Level-5	January 28, 2011 (Note: Released on August 26, 2011, in the United Kingdom.)			
Inazuma Eleven 2: Firestorm and Blizzard	Level-5	March 16, 2012			
South Korea only
Title	Licensor(s)	Release date			Ref.
Title	Licensor(s)	KOR			Ref.
Unoe Sangkwae Teullin Geurim Jeonjip	Namco	March 8, 2007			
Touch! Bomberman Land	Hudson Soft	April 29, 2007			
Sonic Rush Adventure	Sega	September 17, 2009			

PAL regions only
Title	Licensor(s)	Release date	Ref.
Title	Licensor(s)	PAL	Ref.
Mr. Driller Drill Spirits	Namco	March 11, 2005	
Pac-Pix	Namco	May 8, 2005	
Pac 'n Roll	Namco	October 28, 2005	
Viewtiful Joe: Double Trouble!	Capcom	February 24, 2006	
Phoenix Wright: Ace Attorney	Capcom	March 16, 2006	
Resident Evil: Deadly Silence	Capcom	March 31, 2006	
Mega Man Battle Network 5: Double Team DS	Capcom	April 13, 2006	
Phoenix Wright: Ace Attorney - Justice for All	Capcom	March 16, 2007	
Harvest Moon DS	Natsume Inc.	April 13, 2007	
Naruto: Ninja Destiny	Tomy	September 18, 2009	
Naruto: Ninja Council - European Version	Tomy	September 18, 2009	
Apollo Justice: Ace Attorney	Capcom	May 9, 2008	
Phoenix Wright: Ace Attorney - Trials and Tribulations	Capcom	October 3, 2008	
Harvest Moon DS: Island of Happiness	Natsume Inc.	December 12, 2008	
Naruto Shippuden: Ninja Council 3 - European Version	Tomy	September 18, 2009	
Tetris Party Deluxe	Tetris Holding	September 3, 2010	
Naruto: Ninja Destiny II - European Version	Tomy	September 29, 2010	
Solatorobo: Red the Hunter	Bandai	July 1, 2011	

=== DS Download Play ===
All following Nintendo-owned licensed games were created as part of various Nintendo Game Seminars held from 2005 to 2010. These seminars were designed to teach students how to develop games by having them work in groups to create their own titles. Nintendo published these games through DS Download Stations in Japan. Games from seminars held before 2005 were never released, while those from after 2010 were made available on the Wii U eShop. Additionally, the 2009 and 2010 games were also downloadable via the Wii's Minna no Nintendo Channel and Nintendo Zones, alongside DS Download Stations.

Nintendo Game Seminars
Title	Developer(s)	Release date			Ref.
Title	Developer(s)	JP			Ref.
Title	Developer(s)	DS Download Station	Minna no Nintendo Channel	Nintendo Zone	Ref.
Nekosogi Tornado	Nintendo Game Seminar 2005	April 13, 2006	Unreleased	Unreleased	
Kurukeshi!	Nintendo Game Seminar 2005	April 27, 2006	Unreleased	Unreleased	
bioum	Nintendo Game Seminar 2005	May 11, 2006	Unreleased	Unreleased	
Chi to Fu no Oishii Ehon	Nintendo Game Seminar 2005	May 25, 2006	Unreleased	Unreleased	
Attoiumani? Ekakiuta	Nintendo Game Seminar 2006 Team A	March 8, 2007	Unreleased	Unreleased	
KuruKuru Tonzuran	Nintendo Game Seminar 2006 Team B	March 22, 2007	Unreleased	Unreleased	
Ūjai no Tegami Chō	Nintendo Game Seminar 2006 Team C	April 5, 2007	Unreleased	Unreleased	
Hana Otoko to Hana Onna	Nintendo Game Seminar 2006 Team D	April 19, 2007	Unreleased	Unreleased	
Nandemo Mokokoyasan	Nintendo Game Seminar 2007 Team A	March 13, 2008	Unreleased	Unreleased	
Wakeari Heya no Tsuzuki	Nintendo Game Seminar 2007 Team B	March 27, 2008	Unreleased	Unreleased	
Kiki Master	Nintendo Game Seminar 2007 Team C	April 10, 2008	Unreleased	Unreleased	
Watashi no Otochabako	Nintendo Game Seminar 2007 Team D	April 24, 2008	Unreleased	Unreleased	
Fu～Fu～ Kirarin☆	Nintendo Game Seminar 2008 Team A	March 12, 2009	Unreleased	Unreleased	
Re: Koetist	Nintendo Game Seminar 2008 Team B	March 26, 2009	Unreleased	Unreleased	
Ugōgo Trinity	Nintendo Game Seminar 2008 Team C	April 9,2009	Unreleased	Unreleased	
Kao Sapiens	Nintendo Game Seminar 2008 Team D	April 23, 2009	Unreleased	Unreleased	
Draw Draw Penner	Nintendo Game Seminar 2009 Team A	March 11 2010	March 10, 2010	March 12 2010	
Dōmo, DS Desu	Nintendo Game Seminar 2009 Team B	March 25, 2010	March 24, 2010	March 26, 2010	
Ototo	Nintendo Game Seminar 2009 Team C	April 8, 2010	April 7, 2010	April 9, 2010	
Tentsunagi	Nintendo Game Seminar 2009 Team D	April 22, 2010	April 21, 2010	April 23, 2010	
Planetaria	Nintendo Game Seminar 2010 Team 1	April 14, 2011	April 13, 2011	April 15, 2011	
The Tentai Show	Nintendo Game Seminar 2010 Team 2	April 28, 2011	April 27, 2011	April 29, 2011	
Pull Pull Pullpy	Nintendo Game Seminar 2010 Team 3	May 12, 2011	May 11, 2011	May 13, 2011	
FloWooooT	Nintendo Game Seminar 2010 Team 4	May 26, 2011	May 25, 2011	May 27, 2011	

Licenses co-owned by Nintendo
Title	Developer(s)	Licensors	Release date			Ref.
Title	Developer(s)	Licensors	JP	TWN	NA	Ref.
PokéPark: Tsuri Taikai DS (Note: Originally only downloadable at PokéPark 2005 in Japan, then under the name Pokémon: Tsuri Taikai DS at Pokémon Centers and Pokémon Festa 2005 starting from July 17, 2005, before finally becoming available in Taiwan for PokéPark 2006 starting from June 23, 2006.)	Unknown	Nintendo, Creatures Inc., Game Freak	May 16, 2005	June 23, 2006	Unreleased	
Nintendo Fan Network (Note: Only downloadable at kiosks during home games at T-Mobile Park.)	Unknown	Nintendo, Seattle Mariners	Unreleased	Unreleased	July 2007	

=== DSiWare ===
Licenses owned or co-owned by Nintendo
Title	Developer(s)	Release date			Ref.
Title	Developer(s)	JP	NA	PAL	Ref.
Nintendo DSi Browser	Opera Software Nintendo	November 1, 2008	April 20, 2009	April 3, 2009	
Nintendo DSi Camera	Nintendo	November 1, 2008	April 20, 2009	April 3, 2009	
Nintendo DSi Sound	Nintendo	November 1, 2008	April 20, 2009	April 3, 2009	
Nintendo DSi Shop	Nintendo	November 1, 2008	April 20, 2009	April 3, 2009	
Art Style: AQUIA	skip Ltd.	December 24, 2008	April 5, 2009	April 3, 2009	
Art Style: BASE 10	skip Ltd.	December 24, 2008	July 6, 2009	April 3, 2009	
Bird & Beans	Nintendo SPD	December 24, 2008	April 5, 2009	April 6, 2009	
Brain Age Express: Arts & Letters	Nintendo System Development	December 24, 2008	August 10, 2009	October 23, 2009	
Brain Age Express: Math	Nintendo System Development	December 24, 2008	April 5, 2009	June 19, 2009	
Clubhouse Games Express: Family Favorites	Agenda	December 24, 2008	September 7, 2009	November 6, 2009	
Dr. Mario Express	Arika	December 24, 2008	April 20, 2009	May 1, 2009	
Flipnote Studio	Nintendo EAD Tokyo	December 24, 2008	August 12, 2009	August 14, 2009	
Master of Illusion Express: Deep Psyche	Tenyo, Eighting	December 24, 2008	April 20, 2009	May 8, 2009	
Master of Illusion Express: Funny Face	Tenyo, Eighting	December 24, 2008	April 5, 2009	May 1, 2009	
Master of Illusion Express: Shuffle Games	Tenyo, Eighting	December 24, 2008	April 13, 2009	May 15, 2009	
Paper Airplane Chase	Nintendo SPD	December 24, 2008	April 27, 2009	April 3, 2009	
WarioWare: Snapped!	Intelligent Systems Nintendo SPD	December 24, 2008	April 5, 2009	April 3, 2009	
Art Style: PiCTOBiTS	skip Ltd.	January 28, 2009	May 18, 2009	May 22, 2009	
Art Style: ZENGAGE	skip Ltd.	January 28, 2009	July 20, 2009	May 29, 2009	
Clubhouse Games Express: Card Classics	Agenda	January 28, 2009	April 27, 2009	October 30, 2009	
Hobo Nichi Rosenzu 2009	Nintendo	January 28, 2009	Unreleased	Unreleased	
Number Battle	Mitchell Corporation	January 28, 2009	January 25, 2010	August 14, 2009	
Photo Clock	Nintendo	January 28, 2009	May 25, 2009	October 9, 2009	
Touch Solitaire	Nintendo	January 28, 2009	January 11, 2010	September 11, 2009	
Puzzle League Express	Intelligent Systems	January 28, 2009	August 31, 2009	July 17, 2009	
Animal Crossing Calculator	Nintendo	February 25, 2009	May 4, 2009	June 5, 2009	
Art Style: BOXLIFE	skip Ltd.	February 25, 2009	June 22, 2009	July 10, 2009	
Art Style: precipice	skip Ltd.	February 25, 2009	August 3, 2009	June 5, 2009	
Chotto DS Bungaku Zenshuu: Sekai no Bungaku 20	Genius Sonority	February 25, 2009	Unreleased	Unreleased	
Clubhouse Games Express: Strategy Pack	Agenda	February 25, 2009	September 21, 2009	November 20, 2009	
Yōsuke Ide no Kenkō Mahjong DSi	Nintendo	February 25, 2009	Unreleased	Unreleased	
Mario Calculator	Nintendo Software Technology	February 25, 2009	June 15, 2009	July 3, 2009	
Animal Crossing Clock	Nintendo Software Technology	April 1, 2009	May 4, 2009	June 5, 2009	
Ganbaru Watashi no Osaifu Ouendan	Nintendo	April 1, 2009	Unreleased	Unreleased	
Mario Clock	Nintendo Software Technology	April 1, 2009	June 15, 2009	July 3, 2009	
Master of Illusion Express: Mind Probe	Tenyo, Eighting	April 1, 2009	November 30, 2009	December 25, 2009	
Photo Stand Tsuki: Ban-Bro DX Radio	Nintendo	April 1, 2009	Unreleased	Unreleased	
Spin Six	Zener Works	April 1, 2009	June 21, 2010	December 31, 2010	
Wakugumi: Monochrome Puzzle	Mitchell Corporation	April 1, 2009	Unreleased	October 16, 2009	
Atsumeru Egao Chou	Intelligent Systems	April 22, 2009	Unreleased	Unreleased	
Brain Age Express: Sudoku	Nintendo System Development	April 22, 2009	August 17, 2009	July 24, 2009	
Master of Illusion Express: Matchmaker	Tenyo, Eighting	April 22, 2009	December 14, 2009	December 4, 2009	
Sparkle Snapshots	Atlus	April 22, 2009	November 2, 2009	December 25, 2009	
Dokodemo Wii no Ma	Nintendo	May 1, 2009	Unreleased	Unreleased	
Master of Illusion Express: Psychic Camera	Tenyo, Eighting	May 27, 2009	December 28, 2009	December 18, 2009	
New English Training: Learning with Tempo - Beginner Edition	Nintendo SPD	May 27, 2009	Unreleased	February 5, 2010	
Pocket Rurubu Kyoto	Nintendo	May 27, 2009	Unreleased	Unreleased	
Pocket Rurubu Tokyo	Nintendo	May 27, 2009	Unreleased	Unreleased	
Puzzle Iro Iro Monthly Crossword House Vol. 1	Tose	May 27, 2009	Unreleased	Unreleased	
Mario vs. Donkey Kong: Minis March Again!	Nintendo Software Technology	October 7, 2009	June 8, 2009	August 21, 2009	
New English Training: Learning with Tempo - Advanced Edition	Nintendo SPD	June 24, 2009	Unreleased	March 5, 2010	
Dekisugi Tingle Pack	Vanpool	June 24, 2009	Unreleased	Unreleased	
Puzzle Iroiro: Gekkan Crossword House Vol. 2	Tose	July 1, 2009	Unreleased	Unreleased	
Electroplankton: Beatnes	indieszero	July 11, 2009	November 9, 2009	January 15, 2010	
Electroplankton: Hanenbow	indieszero	July 11, 2009	November 9, 2009	January 15, 2010	
Electroplankton: Nanocarp	indieszero	July 11, 2009	November 9, 2009	January 22, 2010	
Electroplankton: Trapy	indieszero	July 11, 2009	November 9, 2009	January 22, 2010	
Game & Watch: Ball	Nintendo	July 15, 2009	April 19, 2010	April 23, 2010	
Game & Watch: Flagman	Nintendo	July 15, 2009	April 19, 2010	April 23, 2010	
Game & Watch: Judge	Nintendo	July 15, 2009	March 22, 2010	March 26, 2010	
Game & Watch: Vermin	Nintendo	July 15, 2009	April 5, 2010	April 9, 2010	
Electroplankton: Lumiloop	indieszero	July 22, 2009	November 23, 2009	February 12, 2010	
Electroplankton: Rec-Rec	indieszero	July 22, 2009	November 9, 2009	February 12, 2010	
Card Hero: Speed Battle Custom	Intelligent Systems	July 29, 2009	Unreleased	Unreleased	
Game & Watch: Chef	Nintendo	July 29, 2009	March 22, 2010	March 26, 2010	
Game & Watch: Helmet	Nintendo	July 29, 2009	April 5, 2010	April 9, 2010	
Pocket Rurubu Hokkaido	Nintendo	July 29, 2009	Unreleased	Unreleased	
Pocket Rurubu Okinawa	Nintendo	July 29, 2009	Unreleased	Unreleased	
Puzzle Iroiro: Gekkan Crossword House Vol. 3	Tose	July 29, 2009	Unreleased	Unreleased	
Electroplankton: Luminarrow	indieszero	August 5, 2009	November 23, 2009	January 29, 2010	
Electroplankton: Sun Animalcule	indieszero	August 5, 2009	November 23, 2009	January 29, 2010	
City Transport Map Volume 1 - 2009	Nintendo	Unreleased	Unreleased	August 7, 2009	
City Transport Map Volume 2 - 2009	Nintendo	Unreleased	Unreleased	August 7, 2009	
Game & Watch: Donkey Kong Jr.	Nintendo	August 19, 2009	April 19, 2010	April 23, 2010	
Game & Watch: Manhole	Nintendo	August 19, 2009	April 5, 2010	April 9, 2010	
Game & Watch: Mario's Cement Factory	Nintendo	August 19, 2009	March 22, 2010	March 26, 2010	
Electroplankton: Marine-Crystals	indieszero	August 26, 2009	November 23, 2009	February 26, 2010	
Electroplankton: Varvoice	indieszero	August 26, 2009	November 23, 2009	February 26, 2010	
Nintendo DSi Instrument Tuner	Nintendo	September 2, 2009	March 29, 2010	Unreleased	
Nintendo DSi Metronome	Nintendo	September 2, 2009	March 29, 2010	Unreleased	
Puzzle Iroiro: Gekkan Crossword House Vol. 4	Tose	September 2, 2009	Unreleased	Unreleased	
Metal Torrent	Arika	September 2, 2009	May 24, 2010	May 7, 2010	
Dictionary 6 in 1 with Camera Function	Intelligent Systems	October 7, 2009	Unreleased	September 4, 2009	
Kyou kara Hajimeru Facening: Kao Tora-Mini (Vol. 1 - 5)	Intelligent Systems	September 9, 2009	Unreleased	Unreleased	
Art Academy: First Semester	Headstrong Games	November 18, 2009	September 14, 2009	December 25, 2009	
PictureBook Games: The Royal Bluff	Grounding Inc.	September 16, 2009	October 26, 2009	November 12, 2009	
Art Academy: Second Semester	Headstrong Games	November 18, 2009	September 28, 2009	January 8, 2010	
Puzzle Iroiro: Gekkan Crossword House Vol. 5	Tose	September 30, 2009	Unreleased	Unreleased	
Art Style: DIGIDRIVE	Q-Games	November 4, 2009	November 16, 2009	October 2, 2009	
Sleep Clock: Record and analyse your sleep patterns	Nintendo	October 7, 2009	Unreleased	October 29, 2010	
Pinball Pulse: The Ancients Beckon	Fuse Games	Unreleased	October 12, 2009	March 5, 2010	
Crash-Course Domo	Suzak	Unreleased	October 19, 2009	Unreleased	
Hard-Hat Domo	Suzak	Unreleased	October 19, 2009	Unreleased	
Pro-Putt Domo	Suzak	Unreleased	October 19, 2009	Unreleased	
Rock-n-Roll Domo	Suzak	Unreleased	October 19, 2009	Unreleased	
White-Water Domo	Suzak	Unreleased	October 19, 2009	Unreleased	
Pocket Rurubu Osaka	Nintendo	October 21, 2009	Unreleased	Unreleased	
Pocket Rurubu Yokohama/Kamakura	Nintendo	October 21, 2009	Unreleased	Unreleased	
Puzzle Iroiro: Gekkan Crossword House Vol. 6	Tose	October 28, 2009	Unreleased	Unreleased	
Link 'n' Launch	Intelligent Systems	November 11, 2009	February 8, 2010	August 6, 2010	
True Swing Golf Express	T&E Soft	Unreleased	February 1, 2010	November 13, 2009	
Spotto!	Intelligent Systems	November 25, 2009	February 15, 2010	February 26, 2010	
Meikyou Kokugo: Rakubiki Jiten	Nintendo	November 25, 2009	Unreleased	Unreleased	
Trajectile	Q-Games	January 20, 2010	April 4, 2010	November 27, 2009	
Nintendo Countdown Calendar	Intelligent Systems	December 2, 2009	September 20, 2010	July 7, 2011	
Snapdots	D4 Enterprise	December 2, 2009	October 18, 2010	October 22, 2010	
A Kappa's Trail	Brownie Brown	December 9, 2009	June 14, 2010	Unreleased	
Photo Dojo	Nintendo	December 16, 2009	May 10, 2010	March 19, 2010	
Starship Defense	Q-Games	February 10, 2010	January 18, 2010	December 18, 2009	
Pocket Rurubu Nagoya	Nintendo	December 24, 2009	Unreleased	Unreleased	
Pocket Rurubu Kobe	Nintendo	December 24, 2009	Unreleased	Unreleased	
Genius Personal Waeiraku Jiten	Nintendo	January 13, 2010	Unreleased	Unreleased	
Genius Personal Eiwaraku Jiten	Nintendo	January 13, 2010	Unreleased	Unreleased	
Flametail	Mindware	January 27, 2010	June 7, 2010	September 10, 2010	
Hobonichi Rosenzu 2010: Zenkoku 7 Area + Shinkansen Map	Nintendo	February 3, 2010	Unreleased	Unreleased	
Aura-Aura Climber	Nintendo Software Technology	November 10, 2010	February 22, 2010	October 1, 2010	
Pocket Rurubu Izuhakone	Nintendo	February 24, 2010	Unreleased	Unreleased	
Pocket Rurubu Shinshuu	Nintendo	February 24, 2010	Unreleased	Unreleased	
Looksley's Line Up	Good-Feel	March 3, 2010	May 17, 2010	June 11, 2010	
Kaite Oboeru: Eitango Chou	Intelligent Systems	March 17, 2010	Unreleased	Unreleased	
Kaite Oboeru: Shashin Tango	Intelligent Systems	March 17, 2010	Unreleased	Unreleased	
DS Kokoro Nurie	Cattle Call	April 7, 2010	Unreleased	Unreleased	
Hobonichi no Kenkou Techou	Nintendo	April 21, 2010	Unreleased	Unreleased	
Tsukutte Utau Saru Band	MuuMuu	April 28, 2010	Unreleased	Unreleased	
X-Scape	Q-Games Nintendo SPD	June 30, 2010	May 31, 2010	July 16, 2010	
Face Pilot: Fly With Your Nintendo DSi Camera!	HAL Laboratory	July 28, 2010	July 26, 2010	June 18, 2010	
Touch de Oboeru Hyakuninisshu: Chotto DSi Shiguredono	Nintendo	November 4, 2010	Unreleased	Unreleased	
Jibun Detsukuru Nintendo DS Guide	Nintendo EAD	November 7, 2010	Unreleased	Unreleased	
The Legend of Zelda: Four Swords Anniversary Edition	Grezzo	September 28, 2011	September 28, 2011	September 28, 2011	
Nintendoji	Grounding Inc.	April 3, 2013	Unreleased	Unreleased	
Famicom Wars DS: Lost Light	Intelligent Systems	October 30, 2013	Unreleased	Unreleased	
WarioWare: Touched! DL	Intelligent Systems	March 17, 2016	March 31, 2016	March 31, 2016	

== Nintendo 3DS ==
Licenses owned or co-owned by Nintendo
Title	Developer(s)	Release date			Ref.
Title	Developer(s)	JP	NA	PAL	Ref.
AR Games (Note: Comes pre-loaded on Nintendo 3DS system.)	Nintendo	February 26, 2011	March 27, 2011	March 25, 2011	
Face Raiders	HAL Laboratory	February 26, 2011	March 27, 2011	March 25, 2011	
StreetPass Mii Plaza	Nintendo SPD	February 26, 2011	March 27, 2011	March 25, 2011	
Nintendogs + Cats: French Bulldog & New Friends, Golden Retriever & New Friends and Toy Poodle & New Friends	Nintendo EAD	February 26, 2011	March 27, 2011	March 25, 2011	
Pilotwings Resort	Monster Games Nintendo SPD	April 14, 2011	March 27, 2011	March 25, 2011	
Steel Diver	Nintendo EAD Vitei	May 12, 2011	March 27, 2011	May 6, 2011	
The Legend of Zelda: Ocarina of Time 3D	Grezzo Nintendo EAD Tokyo	June 16, 2011	June 19, 2011	June 17, 2011	
Star Fox 64 3D	Q-Games; Nintendo EAD	July 14, 2011	September 9, 2011	September 9, 2011	
Pokémon Rumble Blast (Note: Published by The Pokémon Company in Japan.)	Ambrella	August 11, 2011	October 24, 2011	December 2, 2011	
Hana to Ikimono Rittai Zukan	Nintendo	September 29, 2011	Unreleased	Unreleased	
Super Mario 3D Land	Nintendo EAD Tokyo	November 3, 2011	November 13, 2011	November 18, 2011	
Mario Kart 7	Nintendo EAD; Retro Studios	December 1, 2011	December 4, 2011	December 2, 2011	
Spirit Camera: The Cursed Memoir	Tecmo Koei	January 12, 2012	April 13, 2012	June 29, 2012	
Mario & Sonic at the London 2012 Olympic Games (Note: Published by Nintendo only in Japan.)	Sega Sports R&D Racjin	March 1, 2012	February 14, 2012	February 9, 2012	
Kid Icarus: Uprising	Project Sora; Sora Ltd.	March 22, 2012	March 23, 2012	March 23, 2012	
Fire Emblem: Awakening	Intelligent Systems	April 19, 2012	February 4, 2013	April 19, 2013	
Mario Tennis Open	Camelot Software Planning	May 24, 2012	May 20, 2012	May 25, 2012	
Culdcept	OmiyaSoft	June 28, 2012	Unreleased	Unreleased	
Nintendo Pocket Football Club	ParityBit	July 12, 2012	Unreleased	April 17, 2014	
Art Academy: Lessons for Everyone!	Headstrong Games	September 13, 2012	October 1, 2012	July 28, 2012	
Freakyforms Deluxe: Your Creations, Alive!	Asobism	April 10, 2013 (Note: Released on 3DS eShop.)	November 5, 2012	July 28, 2012	
Brain Age: Concentration Training	Nintendo SPD	July 28, 2012	February 10, 2013	July 28, 2017	
New Super Mario Bros. 2	Nintendo EAD	July 28, 2012	August 19, 2012	August 17, 2012	
Style Savvy: Trendsetters	Syn Sophia Nintendo SPD	September 27, 2012	October 22, 2012	November 16, 2012	
Crosswords Plus	Nintendo Software Technology	Unreleased	October 1, 2012	Unreleased	
Animal Crossing: New Leaf	Nintendo EAD	November 8, 2012	June 9, 2013	June 14, 2013	
Paper Mario: Sticker Star	Intelligent Systems	December 6, 2012	November 11, 2012	December 7, 2012	
Pokémon Mystery Dungeon: Gates to Infinity	Spike Chunsoft	23 November 2012	24 March 2013	17 May 2013	
Luigi's Mansion: Dark Moon	Next Level Games	March 20, 2013	March 24, 2013	March 28, 2013	
Tomodachi Life	Nintendo SPD	April 18, 2013	June 6, 2014	June 6, 2014	
Lego City Undercover: The Chase Begins	TT Fusion	March 5, 2015	21 April 2013	26 April 2013	
Donkey Kong Country Returns 3D	Monster Games	June 13, 2013	May 24, 2013	May 24, 2013	
Mario & Luigi: Dream Team	AlphaDream Good-Feel	July 18, 2013	August 11, 2013	July 12, 2013	
Pokémon X and Y	Game Freak	October 12, 2013	October 12, 2013	October 12, 2013	
Daigasso! Band Brothers P	Intelligent Systems	November 14, 2013	Unreleased	Unreleased	
The Legend of Zelda: A Link Between Worlds	Nintendo EAD	December 26, 2013	November 22, 2013	November 22, 2013	
Mario Party: Island Tour	NDcube	March 20, 2014	November 22, 2013	January 17, 2014	
Nintendo 3DS Guide: Louvre	indieszero	November 27, 2013	December 2, 2013	November 27, 2013	
Kirby: Triple Deluxe	HAL Laboratory	January 11, 2014	May 2, 2014	May 16, 2014	
Fossil Fighters: Frontier	Spike Chunsoft	February 27, 2014	March 20, 2015	May 29, 2015	
Yoshi's New Island	Arzest	July 24, 2014	March 14, 2014	March 14, 2014	
Wagamama Fashion: Girls Mode Yokubari Sengen! Tokimeki Up!	syn Sophia	April 17, 2014	Unreleased	Unreleased	
Mario Golf: World Tour	Camelot Software Planning	May 1, 2014	May 2, 2014	May 2, 2014	
Pokémon Art Academy	Headstrong Games	June 19, 2014	October 24, 2014	July 4, 2014	
Super Smash Bros. for Nintendo 3DS	Bandai Namco Studios; Sora Ltd.	September 13, 2014	October 3, 2014	October 3, 2014	
Ultimate NES Remix	Nintendo EAD Tokyo	August 27, 2015	December 5, 2014	November 7, 2014	
Pokémon Omega Ruby and Alpha Sapphire	Game Freak	November 21, 2014	November 21, 2014	November 28, 2014	
The Legend of Zelda: Majora's Mask 3D	Grezzo	February 14, 2015	February 13, 2015	February 13, 2015	
Mario vs. Donkey Kong: Tipping Stars	Nintendo Software Technology	March 19, 2015	March 5, 2015	March 20, 2015	
Code Name: S.T.E.A.M.	Intelligent Systems	May 14, 2015	March 13, 2015	May 15, 2015	
Xenoblade Chronicles 3D (Note: New Nintendo 3DS exclusive title.)	Monolith Soft	April 2, 2015	April 10, 2015	April 2, 2015	
Style Savvy: Fashion Forward	Syn Sophia Nintendo SPD	April 16, 2015	August 19, 2016	November 20, 2015	
Puzzle & Dragons Z + Super Mario Bros. Edition	GungHo Online Entertainment	Unreleased	May 22, 2015	May 8, 2015	
Fire Emblem Fates: Birthright and Conquest	Intelligent Systems	June 25, 2015	February 19, 2016	May 20, 2016	
Rhythm Heaven Megamix	Nintendo SPD	June 11, 2015	June 15, 2016	October 21, 2016	
Animal Crossing: Happy Home Designer	Nintendo EAD	July 30, 2015	September 25, 2015	October 2, 2015	
Pokémon Super Mystery Dungeon	Spike Chunsoft	September 17, 2015	November 20, 2015	February 19, 2016	
Picross 3D: Round 2	HAL Laboratory	October 1, 2015	September 1, 2016	December 2, 2016	
Chibi-Robo! Zip Lash	Skip Ltd.	October 8, 2015	October 9, 2015	November 6, 2015	
The Legend of Zelda: Tri Force Heroes	Nintendo EPD Grezzo	October 22, 2015	October 23, 2015	October 23, 2015	
Pokémon Rumble World	Ambrella	November 19, 2015	April 29, 2016	January 22, 2016	
Mario & Luigi: Paper Jam	AlphaDream	December 3, 2015	January 22, 2016	December 4, 2015	
Mario & Sonic at the Rio 2016 Olympic Games	Sega Sports R&D Arzest	February 18, 2016	March 18, 2016	April 8, 2016	
Hyrule Warriors Legends (Note: Published by Nintendo outside Japan.)	Omega Force Team Ninja	January 21, 2016	March 25, 2016	March 24, 2016	
Disney Art Academy	Headstrong Games	April 7, 2016	May 13, 2016	July 15, 2016	
Kirby: Planet Robobot	HAL Laboratory	April 28, 2016	June 10, 2016	June 10, 2016	
Culdcept Revolt	OmiyaSoft	July 7, 2016	October 3, 2017	October 6, 2017	
Metroid Prime: Federation Force	Next Level Games	August 25, 2016	August 19, 2016	September 2, 2016	
Mario Party: Star Rush	NDcube	October 20, 2016	November 4, 2016	October 7, 2016	
Pokémon Sun and Moon	Game Freak	November 18, 2016	November 18, 2016	November 23, 2016	
Animal Crossing: New Leaf - Welcome Amiibo	Nintendo EPD	November 23, 2016	December 5, 2016	November 25, 2016	
Super Mario Maker for Nintendo 3DS	Nintendo EPD	December 1, 2016	December 2, 2016	December 2, 2016	
Miitopia	Nintendo EPD	December 8, 2016	July 28, 2017	July 28, 2017	
Momotarou Dentetsu 2017: Tachiagare Nippon!!	Valhalla Game Studios	December 22, 2016	Unreleased	Unreleased	
Poochy & Yoshi's Woolly World	Good-Feel	January 19, 2017	February 3, 2017	February 3, 2017	
HakoBoy! Hakozume Box	HAL Laboratory	February 2, 2017	Unreleased	Unreleased	
Mario Sports Superstars	Bandai Namco Studios Camelot Software Planning	March 30, 2017	March 24, 2017	March 10, 2017	
Fire Emblem Echoes: Shadows of Valentia	Intelligent Systems	April 20, 2017	May 19, 2017	May 19, 2017	
Ever Oasis	Grezzo	July 13, 2017	June 23, 2017	June 23, 2017	
Hey! Pikmin	Arzest	July 13, 2017	July 28, 2017	July 28, 2017	
Metroid: Samus Returns	MercurySteam; Nintendo EPD	September 15, 2017	September 15, 2017	September 15, 2017	
Fire Emblem Warriors	Omega Force Team Ninja Intelligent Systems	September 28, 2017	October 20, 2017	October 20, 2017	
Mario & Luigi Superstar Saga + Bowser's Minions	AlphaDream	October 5, 2017	October 6, 2017	October 6, 2017	
Style Savvy: Styling Star	Syn Sophia	November 2, 2017	December 25, 2017	November 24, 2017	
Kirby Battle Royale	HAL Laboratory	November 30, 2017	January 19, 2018	November 3, 2017	
Mario Party: The Top 100	NDcube	December 28, 2017	November 10, 2017	December 22, 2017	
Pokémon Ultra Sun and Ultra Moon	Game Freak	November 17, 2017	November 17, 2017	November 17, 2017	
Detective Pikachu	Creatures Inc.	March 23, 2018	March 23, 2018	March 23, 2018	
Dillon's Dead-Heat Breakers	Vanpool	April 26, 2018	May 24, 2018	May 25, 2018	
Sushi Striker: The Way of Sushido	Nintendo EPD; indieszero	June 8, 2018	June 8, 2018	June 8, 2018	
Captain Toad: Treasure Tracker	Nintendo EPD Nintendo Software Technology	July 13, 2018	July 13, 2018	July 13, 2018	
WarioWare Gold	Intelligent Systems	August 2, 2018	August 3, 2018	July 27, 2018	
Luigi's Mansion	Grezzo	October 19, 2018	October 12, 2018	October 19, 2018	
Mario & Luigi: Bowser's Inside Story + Bowser Jr.'s Journey	AlphaDream	December 27, 2018	January 11, 2019	January 25, 2019	
Kirby's Extra Epic Yarn	Good-Feel HAL Laboratory	March 8, 2019	March 8, 2019	March 8, 2019	

Licensed to Nintendo (original release published by another company)
North America and PAL regions only
Title	Licensor(s)	Release date		Ref.
Title	Licensor(s)	NA	PAL	Ref.
Professor Layton and the Miracle Mask (Note: Published by Nintendo outside Japan.)	Level-5	October 28, 2012	October 26, 2012	
Professor Layton and the Azran Legacy	Level-5	February 28, 2014	November 8, 2013	
Bravely Default	Square Enix	February 7, 2014	December 6, 2013	
Professor Layton vs. Phoenix Wright: Ace Attorney	Level-5 Capcom	March 29, 2014	March 28, 2014	
Disney Magical World	Bandai Namco Games	April 11, 2014	October 24, 2014	
Fantasy Life	Level-5	October 24, 2014	September 26, 2014	
LBX: Little Battlers eXperience	Level-5	August 21, 2015	September 4, 2015	
Yo-kai Watch	Level-5	November 6, 2015	April 29, 2016	
Bravely Second: End Layer	Square Enix	April 15, 2016	February 26, 2016	
Dragon Quest VII: Fragments of the Forgotten Past	Square Enix	September 16, 2016	September 16, 2016	
Yo-kai Watch 2: Bony Spirits and Fleshy Souls	Level-5	September 30, 2016	April 7, 2017	
Disney Magical World 2	Bandai Namco Games	October 14, 2016	October 14, 2016	
Dragon Quest VIII: Journey of the Cursed King	Square Enix	January 20, 2017	January 20, 2017	
Monster Hunter Stories	Marvelous	September 8, 2017	September 8, 2017	
Yo-kai Watch 2: Psychic Specters	Level-5	September 29, 2017	September 29, 2017	
Yo-Kai Watch Blasters: Red Cat Corps and White Dog Squad	Level-5	September 7, 2018	September 8, 2018	
Yo-kai Watch 3	Level-5	February 8, 2019	December 7, 2018	
North America only
Title	Licensor(s)	Release date		Ref.
Title	Licensor(s)	NA		Ref.
Tetris: Axis	Hudson Soft	October 2, 2011		
PAL regions only
Title	Licensor(s)	Release date		Ref.
Title	Licensor(s)	PAL		Ref.
Inazuma Eleven 3: Lighting Bolt and Bomb Blast	Level-5	September 27, 2013		
Scribblenauts Unlimited	Warner Bros. Interactive Entertainment	December 6, 2013		
Inazuma Eleven 3: Team Ogre Attacks!	Level-5	February 14, 2014		
Inazuma Eleven GO Light and Shadow	Level-5	June 13, 2014		
Phonics Fun with Biff, Chip & Kipper (Vol. 1 - 3)	IE Institute	September 12, 2014		
Gardening Mama 2: Forest Friends	Cooking Mama Limited	March 6, 2015		
Cooking Mama 5: Bon Appétit!	Cooking Mama Limited	March 6, 2015		
Inazuma Eleven GO Chrono Stones: Wildfire and Thunderflash	Level-5	March 27, 2015		
Story of Seasons	Marvelous	December 31, 2015		
Teddy Together	Arika	July 1, 2016		
Story of Seasons: Trio of Towns	Marvelous	October 13, 2017		
Japan only
Title	Licensor(s)	Release date		Ref.
Title	Licensor(s)	JP		Ref.
Shovel Knight	Yacht Club Games	June 30, 2016		
South Korea only
Title	Licensor(s)	Release date		Ref.
Title	Licensor(s)	KOR		Ref.
Shin Megami Tensei IV	Atlus	November 9, 2013		
Lego Legends of Chima: Laval's Journey	Warner Bros. Interactive Entertainment	January 23, 2014		
Hatsune Miku: Project Mirai DX	Sega	May 28, 2015		

Nintendo as distributor only (no involvement in licensing or publishing)
North America and PAL regions only
Title	Licensor(s)	Release date		Ref.
Title	Licensor(s)	NA	PAL	Ref.
Layton's Mystery Journey: Katrielle and the Millionaire's Conspiracy	Level-5	October 6, 2017	October 6, 2017	
Minecraft: New Nintendo 3DS Edition (Note: New Nintendo 3DS exclusive title.)	Mojang Studios	November 10, 2017	November 10, 2017	
PAL regions only
Title	Licensor(s)	Release date		Ref.
Title	Licensor(s)	PAL		Ref.
Super Street Fighter IV: 3D Edition	Capcom	March 25, 2011		
Dead or Alive: Dimensions	Koei Tecmo	May 20, 2011		
Resident Evil: The Mercenaries 3D	Capcom	July 1, 2011		
Resident Evil: Revelations	Capcom	January 27, 2012		
One Piece: Unlimited Cruise SP	Bandai Namco Games	February 10, 2012		
Rhythm Thief & the Emperor's Treasure	Sega	April 5, 2012		
Kingdom Hearts 3D: Dream Drop Distance	Square Enix	July 20, 2012		
Heroes of Ruin	n-Space	June 15, 2012		
Castlevania: Lords of Shadow – Mirror of Fate	Konami	March 8, 2013		
Monster Hunter 3 Ultimate	Capcom	March 22, 2013		
Sonic Lost World	Sega	October 18, 2013		
Sonic Boom: Shattered Crystal	Sega	November 21, 2014		
Monster Hunter 4 Ultimate	Capcom	February 13, 2015		
Harvest Moon: The Lost Valley	Rising Star Games	June 19, 2015		
Monster Hunter Generations	Capcom	July 15, 2016		
Sonic Boom: Fire & Ice	Sega	September 30, 2016		

=== eShop exclusives ===
Licenses owned or co-owned by Nintendo
Title	Developer(s)	Release date			Ref.
Title	Developer(s)	JP	NA	PAL	Ref.
3D Classics: Excitebike	Arika	June 7, 2011	June 6, 2011	June 7, 2011	
Pokédex 3D (Note: Published by The Pokémon Company in Japan.)	Creatures Inc.	June 17, 2011	June 6, 2011	June 7, 2011	
Itsu no Ma ni Televi	Nintendo	June 21, 2011	Unreleased	Unreleased	
3D Classics: Urban Champion	Arika	July 13, 2011	August 18, 2011	August 18, 2011	
Nintendo Video	Nintendo	July 13, 2011	July 21, 2011	July 13, 2011	
3D Classics: Xevious	Arika	June 7, 2011	July 21, 2011	July 21, 2011	
3D Classics: TwinBee	Arika	August 10, 2011	September 22, 2011	September 22, 2011	
Freakyforms: Your Creations, Alive!	Asobism	September 7, 2011	November 10, 2011	November 10, 2011	
Pushmo	Intelligent Systems	October 5, 2011	December 8, 2011	December 8, 2011	
Ketzal's Corridors	Keys Factory	October 21, 2011	April 12, 2012	April 5, 2012	
Sakura Samurai: Art of the Sword	Grounding Inc.	November 16, 2011	February 2, 2012	October 11, 2012	
3D Classics: Kirby's Adventure	Arika	April 25, 2012	November 17, 2011	November 17, 2011	
Swapnote	Nintendo System Development; Denyu-sha	December 21, 2011	December 22, 2011	December 22, 2011	
Sparkle Snapshots 3D	Atlus	December 27, 2011	July 12, 2012	October 18, 2012	
3D Classics: Kid Icarus	Arika	January 18, 2012	April 19, 2012	February 2, 2012	
Dillon's Rolling Western	Vanpool	February 22, 2012	February 22, 2012	February 22, 2012	
Pokémon Dream Radar	Creatures Inc.	June 23, 2012	October 7, 2012	October 12, 2012	
Pokédex 3D Pro	Creatures Inc.	July 14, 2012	November 8, 2012	November 8, 2012	
Tokyo Crash Mobs	Mitchell Corporation; Nintendo SPD	August 8, 2012	January 17, 2013	January 17, 2013	
HarmoKnight	Game Freak	September 5, 2012	March 28, 2013	March 28, 2013	
Club Nintendo Picross	Jupiter Corporation	September 13, 2012	Unreleased	Unreleased	
Crashmo	Intelligent Systems	October 31, 2012	November 22, 2012	November 15, 2012	
Fluidity: Spin Cycle	Curve Studios	December 19, 2012	December 27, 2012	December 13, 2012	
Hitsuji no Shaun 3D: (Dai 1 - 5)	Nintendo	February 21, 2013	Unreleased	Unreleased	
Kersploosh! (Note: Published by Nintendo outside Japan.)	Poisoft	June 7, 2011	March 7, 2013	February 28, 2013	
Dillon's Rolling Western: The Last Ranger	Vanpool	April 11, 2013	April 11, 2013	June 27, 2013	
Photos With Mario	Nintendo	April 15, 2013	May 18, 2014	Unreleased	
Mario and Donkey Kong: Minis on the Move	Nintendo Software Technology	July 24, 2013	May 9, 2013	May 9, 2013	
Chibi-Robo! Photo Finder	Skip Ltd.	July 3, 2013	January 9, 2014	July 3, 2014	
Flipnote Studio 3D	Nintendo EAD Tokyo	July 24, 2013	February 10, 2015	March 31, 2016	
Rusty's Real Deal Baseball	Nintendo	August 8, 2013	April 3, 2014	Unreleased	
Daigassou! Band Brothers P - Shimobe Tool	Nintendo	October 1, 2013	Unreleased	Unreleased	
Photos with Animal Crossing	Nintendo	November 21, 2013	Unreleased	July 10, 2015	
Isshoni Photo Pikmin	Nintendo	December 2, 2013	Unreleased	Unreleased	
Chikaku no BanBro P wo Motteiru Hito to Issho ni Gassou Dekiru	Intelligent Systems	December 19, 2013	Unreleased	Unreleased	
Pokémon Bank	Game Freak	December 25, 2013	February 5, 2014	February 4, 2014	
Poké Transporter	Game Freak	December 25, 2013	February 5, 2014	February 4, 2014	
Steel Diver: Sub Wars	Nintendo EAD; Vitei	February 13, 2014	February 13, 2014	February 13, 2014	
Pokémon Battle Trozei	Genius Sonority	March 12, 2014	March 20, 2014	March 13, 2014	
Tōzoku to 1000-biki no Pokémon	MarvelousAQL	June 5, 2014	Unreleased	Unreleased	
Dedede's Drum Dash Deluxe	HAL Laboratory	July 23, 2014	August 29, 2014	February 13, 2015	
Kirby Fighters Deluxe	HAL Laboratory	July 23, 2014	August 29, 2014	February 13, 2015	
Club Nintendo Picross Plus	Jupiter Corporation	October 9, 2014	Unreleased	Unreleased	
Nintendo Badge Arcade	Nintendo SPD	December 17, 2014	November 10, 2015	November 13, 2015	
BoxBoy!	HAL Laboratory	January 14, 2015	April 2, 2015	April 2, 2015	
Pokémon Shuffle	Genius Sonority	February 18, 2015	February 18, 2015	February 18, 2015	
Yakuman Houou	Nintendo	February 18, 2015	Unreleased	Unreleased	
Pokémon Rumble World	Ambrella	April 8, 2015	April 8, 2015	April 8, 2015	
Nikki's Travel Quiz (Note: This title was exclusively available via the Club Nintendo service.)	Jupiter Corporation	April 21, 2015	Unreleased	Unreleased	
Stretchmo	Intelligent Systems	May 12, 2015	May 14, 2015	May 14, 2015	
Dr. Mario: Miracle Cure	Arika; Nintendo SPD Group No. 2	May 31, 2015	June 11, 2015	June 11, 2015	
Daigassou! Band Brothers P Debut	Nintendo	July 22, 2015	Unreleased	Unreleased	
Real Dasshutsu Game x Nintendo 3DS: Chou Hakai Keikaku Kara no Dasshutsu	Nintendo	July 31, 2015	Unreleased	Unreleased	
Pokémon Picross	Jupiter	December 2, 2015	December 3, 2015	December 3, 2015	
BoxBoxBoy!	HAL Laboratory	January 6, 2016	June 30, 2016	June 30, 2016	
Mini Mario & Friends: Amiibo Challenge	Nintendo Software Technology	January 28, 2016	April 28, 2016	April 28, 2016	
My Nintendo Picross: The Legend of Zelda: Twilight Princess	Nintendo	March 17, 2016	March 31, 2016	March 31, 2016	
Pocket Card Jockey	Game Freak	July 31, 2013	May 5, 2016	May 5, 2016	
Metroid Prime: Blast Ball	Next Level Games	July 22, 2016	July 21, 2016	July 21, 2016	
Swapdoodle	Nintendo EPD	November 22, 2016	November 17, 2016	November 17, 2016	
Tank Troopers	Nintendo EPD; Vitei	December 21, 2016	February 16, 2017	February 16, 2017	
Bye-Bye BoxBoy!	HAL Laboratory	February 2, 2017	April 12, 2017	March 23, 2017	
Team Kirby Clash Deluxe	HAL Laboratory	April 13, 2017	April 12, 2017	April 12, 2017	
Kirby's Blowout Blast	HAL Laboratory	July 4, 2017	July 6, 2017	July 6, 2017	

The Pokémon Company-published titles (Note: The Pokémon Company is jointly owned by Nintendo, Game Freak, and Creatures.)
Title	Developer(s)	Release date		
Title	Developer(s)	JP	NA	PAL
Tōzoku to 1000-biki no Pokémon	Marvelous AQL	June 5, 2014	Unreleased	Unreleased
Meitantei Pikachu ~Shin Konbi Tanjō~	Creatures Inc.	February 3, 2016	Unreleased	Unreleased

== Mobile & smart devices ==
Licenses owned or co-owned by Nintendo
Title	Developer(s)	Platform(s)	Release date			Ref.
Title	Developer(s)	Platform(s)	JP	NA	PAL	Ref.
Miitomo (Note: Shut down on May 9, 2018.)	Nintendo EPD	Android, iOS	March 17, 2016	March 31, 2016	March 31, 2016	
Super Mario Run	Nintendo EPD	iOS	December 15, 2016			
Super Mario Run	Nintendo EPD	Android	March 23, 2017	March 22, 2017	March 22, 2017	
Fire Emblem Heroes	Intelligent Systems	Android, iOS	February 2, 2017			
Animal Crossing: Pocket Camp (Note: Unavailable since the release of the complete version on December 2, 2024.)	Nintendo EPD, NDcube	Android, iOS	November 21, 2017			
Dragalia Lost (Note: Shut down on November 30, 2022.)	Cygames	Android, iOS	September 27, 2018	September 27, 2018	January 26, 2019	
Dr. Mario World (Note: Shut down on November 1, 2021.)	Nintendo EPD, LINE, NHN Entertainment	Android, iOS	July 10, 2019			
Mario Kart Tour (Note: Shut down on September 30, 2026.)	Nintendo EPD	Android, iOS	September 25, 2019			
Animal Crossing: Pocket Camp Complete	Nintendo EPD, NDcube	Android, iOS	December 2, 2024			
Hello, Mario!	Nintendo	Android, iOS	August 26, 2025	February 19, 2026	February 19, 2026	
Fire Emblem Shadows	Intelligent Systems, DeNA	Android, iOS	September 25, 2025			
Hello, Yoshi!	Nintendo	Android, iOS	November 18, 2025	April 9, 2026	April 9, 2026	
Pictonico!	Nintendo EPD, Intelligent Systems	Android, iOS	May 28, 2026			
Hello, Luigi!	Nintendo	Android, iOS	TBA			
Hello, Peach!	Nintendo	Android, iOS	TBA			

Applications
Title	Developer(s)	Platform(s)	Release date		
Title	Developer(s)	Platform(s)	JP	NA	PAL
Nintendo Switch Parental Controls	Nintendo	Android, iOS	March 3, 2017		
Nintendo Switch App (Note: Called Nintendo Switch Online until May 29, 2025.)	Nintendo	Android, iOS	July 21, 2017		
Nintendo Store (Note: Called My Nintendo in Japan until its worldwide release on November 5, 2025.)	Nintendo	Android, iOS	April 21, 2020	November 5, 2025	November 5, 2025
Nintendo Music	Nintendo	Android, iOS	October 30, 2024		
Nintendo Music	Nintendo	Android Auto, CarPlay, iPadOS, Web	June 1, 2026		
Nintendo Today!	Nintendo	Android, iOS	March 27, 2025		

The Pokémon Company-published titles
Title	Developer(s)	Platform(s)	Release date			Ref.
Title	Developer(s)	Platform(s)	JP	NA	PAL	Ref.
Pokémon Ie TAP?	Creatures Inc.	iOS	July 15, 2011	Unreleased	Unreleased	
Pokémon Ie TAP?	Creatures Inc.	Android	August 11, 2011	Unreleased	Unreleased	
Pokédex for iOS	Creatures Inc.	iOS	December 6, 2012	December 10, 2012	December 10, 2012	
Pocket Monsters Black 2・White 2 Kōshiki Guide Book	The Pokémon Company	Android, iOS	December 14, 2012	Unreleased	Unreleased	
Pokémon TV (Note: Shut down on March 28, 2024.)	The Pokémon Company	Android, iOS, tvOS, Roku, fireTV	February 12, 2013			
Pocket Monsters X・Y Kōshiki Kanzen Kōryaku Guide	The Pokémon Company	Android, iOS	November 22, 2013	Unreleased	Unreleased	
Pokémon Trading Card Game Online (Note: Shut down on June 8, 2023.)	Electrified Games, Sleepy Giant Entertainment, Plexipixel, Inversoft, Dire Wolf Digital	iPadOS	September 30, 2014			
Pokémon Trading Card Game Online	Electrified Games, Sleepy Giant Entertainment, Plexipixel, Inversoft, Dire Wolf Digital	Andoid Tablets	April 7, 2016			
Camp Pokémon	Creatures Inc.	iOS	Unreleased	October 21, 2014	October 21, 2014	
Camp Pokémon	Creatures Inc.	Android	Unreleased	April 14, 2016	April 14, 2016	
Pocket Monsters Omega Ruby・Alpha Sapphire Kōshiki Kanzen Kōryaku Guide	The Pokémon Company	iOS	November 22, 2014	Unreleased	Unreleased	
Pokémon Daisuki Club Kōshiki App	The Pokémon Company	Android, iOS	February 4, 2015	Unreleased	Unreleased	
Pokémon Style	The Pokémon Company	Android	February 15, 2015	Unreleased	Unreleased	
Pokémon de Manabu Real Eigo xy Taiyaku Scope	The Pokémon Company	iOS	April 9, 2015	Unreleased	Unreleased	
Pokémon Jukebox	The Pokémon Company	Android	May 7, 2015	June 23, 2015	June 23, 2015	
Odoru? Pokémon Ongakutai	Creatures Inc.	Android, iOS	June 30, 2015	Unreleased	Unreleased	
Pokémon Mega Stone Plus List Online	The Pokémon Company	Android, iOS	July 13, 2015	Unreleased	Unreleased	
Pokémon Shuffle Mobile	Genius Sonority	Android, iOS	August 24, 2015	September 1, 2015	September 1, 2015	
9×9 Quest ~Shōgakusei Sansū App Pocket Monsters Version~	The Pokémon Company	Android, iOS	October 6, 2015	Unreleased	Unreleased	
Pokémon EXPO Gym Gear	The Pokémon Company	Android, iOS	November 18, 2015	Unreleased	Unreleased	
Pokémon Photo Booth	NotWithoutUs	iOS	Unreleased	February 24, 2016	February 24, 2016	
Pokémon Photo Booth	NotWithoutUs	Android	Unreleased	April 9, 2016	February 24, 2016	
Pokémon Duel	Heroz	Android	April 12, 2016	January 24, 2017	January 24, 2017	
Pokémon Duel	Heroz	iOS	April 19, 2016	January 24, 2017	January 24, 2017	
Pokémon Duel	Heroz	fire	October 2, 2017			
Pokémon: Magikarp Jump	Select Button inc.	Android, iOS	May 23, 2017	May 24, 2017	May 25, 2017	
Pokémon Playhouse	The Pokémon Company	Android, fire, iOS	Unreleased	September 21, 2017	September 21, 2017	
Pikachu Talk	The Pokémon Company	Google Assistant	November 8, 2017	February 26, 2018	February 26, 2018	
Pikachu Talk	The Pokémon Company	Amazon Alexa	November 8, 2017	February 26, 2018	February 26, 2018	
Pokémon Quest	Game Freak	Android, iOS	June 27, 2018			
Pokémon Pass	The Pokémon Company	Android, iOS	Unreleased	May 1, 2019	Unreleased	
Pokémon Trading Card Game Card Dex	The Pokémon Company	Android, iOS	February 8, 2019			
Pokémon Rumble Rush	Ambrella	Android	May 22, 2019			
Pokémon Rumble Rush	Ambrella	iOS	July 23, 2019			
Pokémon Home	ILCA	Android, iOS	February 12, 2020			
Pokémon Smile	The Pokémon Company	Android, iOS	June 17, 2020			
Pokémon Café Mix (Note: Updated as Pokémon Café ReMix on October 28, 2021.)	Genius Sonority	Android, iOS	June 24, 2020			
Pokémon UNITE	TiMi Studio Group	Android, iOS	September 22, 2021			
Pokémon Café ReMix (Note: Originally released as Pokémon Café Mix on June 24, 2020.)	Genius Sonority	Android, iOS	October 28, 2021			
Pokémon Trading Card Game Live	The Pokémon Company	Android, iOS	June 8, 2023			
Pokémon Sleep	The Pokémon Company, Select Button inc.	Android, iOS	July 20, 2023	July 20, 2023	July 18, 2023	
Pokémon Trading Card Game Pocket	DeNA, Creatures Inc.	Android, iOS	October 30, 2024			
Pokémon Friends	Wonderfy	Android, iOS	July 22, 2025			
Play! Pokémon Access	The Pokémon Company International	Android, iOS	Unreleased	August 4, 2025	July 28, 2025	
Pokémon Events	The Pokémon Company International	Android, iOS	August 7, 2025	August 6, 2025	August 7, 2025	
Official PokéPark KANTO App	PokéPark KANTO	Android, iOS	November 11, 2025			
Pokémon GOITA	The Pokémon Company, PUZZLING	Android, iOS	December 17, 2025	Unreleased	Unreleased	
Pokémon Champions	The Pokémon Works	Android, iOS	June 17, 2026			

== Developed but not published by Nintendo ==
Title	Platform(s)	Developer(s)	Publisher(s)	Release date (Japan)	Release date (North America)	Ref.						
Title	Platform(s)	Developer(s)	Publisher(s)	Release date (Japan)	Release date (North America)	Ref.	Pikmin Bloom	Android, iOS	Nintendo EPD, Niantic	Niantic	November 1, 2021	October 28, 2021

== Officially licensed without Nintendo's involvement ==
There have been several commercially released video games officially licensed to use Nintendo-owned intellectual properties without the company or one of its subsidiaries being involved in the game's production or distribution.

Title	Developer(s)	Publisher(s)	Platform(s)	Release date			Ref.
Title	Developer(s)	Publisher(s)	Platform(s)	JP	NA	PAL	Ref.
Fully Nintendo-Owned Licenses
Super Mario Bros.	Nelsonic Industries	Nelsonic Industries	Nelsonic Game Watch	Unreleased	June 1, 1989	Unreleased	
The Legend of Zelda	Nelsonic Industries	^{NA}Nelsonic Industries^{EU}Zeon	Nelsonic Game Watch	Unreleased	October 5, 1989	December 1992	
Mario's Egg Catch	S.I.U.	McDonald's	Game Watch	1990	1990	Unreleased	
Luigi's Hammer Toss	S.I.U.	McDonald's	Game Watch	1990	1990	Unreleased	
Princess Toadstool's Castle Run	S.I.U.	McDonald's	Game Watch	1990	1990	Unreleased	
Super Mario Bros. 3	Nelsonic Industries	^{NA}Nelsonic Industries^{EU}Zeon	Nelsonic Game Watch	Unreleased	1990	December 1992	
Tetris	Nelsonic Industries	^{NA}Nelsonic Industries^{EU}Zeon	Nelsonic Game Watch	Unreleased	1990	December 1992	
Super Mario World: Super Mario Bros. 4	Nelsonic Industries	Nelsonic Industries	Nelsonic Game Watch	Unreleased	1991	Unreleased	
Super Mario World: Super Mario Bros. 4	Epoch Co.	Epoch Co.	Barcode Battler II	1992	Unreleased	Unreleased	
Super Mario Race	Mani Ltd.	^{NA}Mani Ltd.^{EU}Zeon	Gamewatch Boy	Unreleased	1992	1992	
Zelda no Densetsu: Kamigami no Triforce	Epoch Co.	Epoch Co.	Barcode Battler II	1992	Unreleased	Unreleased	
^{NA}Star Fox^{EU}Starwing	Nelsonic Industries	Nelsonic Industries	Nelsonic Game Watch	Unreleased	1993	June 1993	
Donkey Kong	Nelsonic Industries	Nelsonic Industries	Nelsonic Game Watch	Unreleased	November 1, 1994	Unreleased	
Donkey Kong Jr.	Stadlbauer	Stadlbauer	Nintendo Mini Classics	Unreleased	August 6, 1998	August 6, 1998	
Fire!	Stadlbauer	Stadlbauer	Nintendo Mini Classics	Unreleased	August 6, 1998	August 6, 1998	
Parachute	Stadlbauer	Stadlbauer	Nintendo Mini Classics	Unreleased	August 6, 1998	August 6, 1998	
Super Mario Bros.	Stadlbauer	Stadlbauer	Nintendo Mini Classics	Unreleased	August 6, 1998	August 6, 1998	
Carrera	Stadlbauer	Stadlbauer	Nintendo Mini Classics	Unreleased	December 30, 1998	December 30, 1998	
Soccer	Stadlbauer	Stadlbauer	Nintendo Mini Classics	Unreleased	December 30, 1998	December 30, 1998	
Spider-Man	Stadlbauer	Stadlbauer	Nintendo Mini Classics	Unreleased	December 30, 1998	December 30, 1998	
Star Trek	Stadlbauer	Stadlbauer	Nintendo Mini Classics	Unreleased	Unreleased	December 30, 1998	
Star Trek: The Next Generation	Stadlbauer	Stadlbauer	Nintendo Mini Classics	Unreleased	Unreleased	December 30, 1998	
Sudoku	Stadlbauer	Stadlbauer	Nintendo Mini Classics	Unreleased	Unreleased	December 30, 1998	
The Smurfs	Stadlbauer	Stadlbauer	Nintendo Mini Classics	Unreleased	Unreleased	December 30, 1998	
Yu-Gi-Oh!	Stadlbauer	Stadlbauer	Nintendo Mini Classics	Unreleased	December 30, 1998	December 30, 1998	
Donkey Kong	Stadlbauer	Stadlbauer	Nintendo Mini Classics	Unreleased	1998	1998	
Mario's Cement Factory	Stadlbauer	Stadlbauer	Nintendo Mini Classics	Unreleased	1998	1998	
Octopus	Stadlbauer	Stadlbauer	Nintendo Mini Classics	Unreleased	1998	1998	
Oil Panic	Stadlbauer	Stadlbauer	Nintendo Mini Classics	Unreleased	Unreleased	1998	
Snoopy Tennis	Stadlbauer	Stadlbauer	Nintendo Mini Classics	Unreleased	1998	1998	
Zelda	Stadlbauer	Stadlbauer	Nintendo Mini Classics	Unreleased	1998	1998	
Puzzle Collection: Hello Kitty no Beads Kо̄bо̄	Imagineer	Imagineer	Game Boy Color	July 17, 1999	Unreleased	Unreleased	
Cruis'n Exotica	Crawfish Interactive	Midway Games	Game Boy Color	Unreleased	October 31, 2000	Unreleased	
Tetris	Stadlbauer	Stadlbauer	Nintendo Mini Classics	Unreleased	Unreleased	November 29, 2000	
Mario Family	Natsume Atari	Jaguar	Game Boy Color	August 27, 2001	Unreleased	Unreleased	
Balloon Fight	Sonic Powered	Sharp Corporation	Sharp Zaurus	September 2001	Unreleased	Unreleased	
Clu Clu Land	Sonic Powered	Sharp Corporation	Sharp Zaurus	September 2001	Unreleased	Unreleased	
Cruis'n Velocity	Graphic State	Midway Games	Game Boy Advance	Unreleased	November 27, 2001	February 8, 2002	
Harry Potter and the Goblet of Fire	Stadlbauer	Stadlbauer	Nintendo Mini Classics	Unreleased	Unreleased	December 30, 2007	
UEFA Euro 2008	Stadlbauer	Stadlbauer	Nintendo Mini Classics	Unreleased	Unreleased	December 30, 2007	
Nintendo / Hudson Soft Co-Owned Licenses
Game Boy Wars Turbo	Hudson Soft	Hudson Soft	Game Boy	June 24, 1997	Unreleased	Unreleased	
Game Boy Wars Turbo	Hudson Soft	Hudson Soft	Nintendo Power	March 1, 2000	Unreleased	Unreleased	
Game Boy Wars Turbo Famitsu Version	Hudson Soft	Hudson Soft	Game Boy	1997	Unreleased	Unreleased	
Game Boy Wars 2	Hudson Soft	Hudson Soft	Game Boy Color	November 20, 1998	Unreleased	Unreleased	
Game Boy Wars 3	Hudson Soft	Hudson Soft	Game Boy Color	August 30, 2001	Unreleased	Unreleased	
Nintendo / Creatures Inc. / Game Freak Co-Owned Licenses
Pokémate	Square Enix	Square Enix	FOMA 900i/901i/902i series	June 5, 2006	Unreleased	Unreleased	
Pokémate	Square Enix	Square Enix	FOMA 700i/701i/702i series, Kids Keitai	October 6, 2006	Unreleased	Unreleased	
Pokémate	Square Enix	Square Enix	DOLCE SL, prosolid II, Music Porter II	November 8, 2006	Unreleased	Unreleased	
Pokémate	Square Enix	Square Enix	FOMA 903i series, FOMA N902iX HIGH-SPEED	December 11, 2006	Unreleased	Unreleased	
Pokémate	Square Enix	Square Enix	FOMA SO903i, FOMA P702iD	January 16, 2007	Unreleased	Unreleased	
Pokémon Tretta Lab	Takara Tomy, Marvelous AQL	Takara Tomy	Nintendo 3DS eShop	August 10, 2013	Unreleased	Unreleased	
Pokémon GO	Niantic	Niantic	iOS	July 6, 2016			
Pokémon GO	Niantic	Niantic	Android	July 6, 2016			
Playground: Pokémon Detective Pikachu	Google	Google	Android	May 2, 2019			
Pokémon Masters (Note: Updated as Pokémon Master EX on August 25, 2020.)	DeNA	DeNA	iOS	August 29, 2019			
Pokémon Masters	DeNA	DeNA	Android	August 29, 2019			
Pokémon Wave Hello	The Pokémon Company	Google	Android	October 15, 2019			
Pokémon Medallion Battle	GC Turbo	Facebook	Facebook Gaming	December 23, 2019			
Pokémon Tower Battle	Bombay Play	Facebook	Facebook Gaming	December 23, 2019			
Pokémon Masters EX (Note: Originally released as Pokémon Masters on August 29, 2019.)	DeNA	DeNA	iOS	August 25, 2020			
Pokémon Masters EX	DeNA	DeNA	Android	August 25, 2020			
Nintendo / Jupiter Corporation Co-Owned Licenses
PICROSS e	Jupiter Corporation	Jupiter Corporation	Nintendo 3DS eShop	July 27, 2011	June 13, 2013	September 6, 2012	
PICROSS e2	Jupiter Corporation	Jupiter Corporation	Nintendo 3DS eShop	December 28, 2011	January 24, 2013	July 25, 2013	
PICROSS e3	Jupiter Corporation	Jupiter Corporation	Nintendo 3DS eShop	June 12, 2013	October 3, 2013	November 14, 2013	
PICROSS e4	Jupiter Corporation	Jupiter Corporation	Nintendo 3DS eShop	November 20, 2013	May 1, 2014	May 22, 2014	
PICROSS e5	Jupiter Corporation	Jupiter Corporation	Nintendo 3DS eShop	June 11, 2014	November 13, 2014	November 13, 2014	
PICROSS e6	Jupiter Corporation	Jupiter Corporation	Nintendo 3DS eShop	December 24, 2014	August 6, 2015	July 30, 2015	
PICROSS e7	Jupiter Corporation	Jupiter Corporation	Nintendo 3DS eShop	April 27, 2016	December 15, 2016	December 22, 2016	
PICROSS e8	Jupiter Corporation	Jupiter Corporation	Nintendo 3DS eShop	December 20, 2017	December 21, 2017	January 18, 2018	
Sanrio characters Picross	Jupiter Corporation	Jupiter Corporation	Nintendo 3DS eShop	April 25, 2018	July 19, 2018	June 28, 2018	
PICROSS e9	Jupiter Corporation	Jupiter Corporation	Nintendo 3DS eShop	August 8, 2018	Unreleased	Unreleased	

== See also ==
- List of Game & Watch games
- List of Game Boy games
- List of Virtual Boy games
- List of Game Boy Color games
- List of Game Boy Advance games
- List of Nintendo DS games
- List of Nintendo 3DS games
