= Nintendo Fan Network =

Interactive software program

- Developer: Nintendo
- Launched: 2007
- Platforms: Nintendo DS, Nintendo DSi, Nintendo 3DS
- Status: Discontinued

The Nintendo Fan Network was an interactive software program created by Nintendo in 2007, that gives visitors to T-Mobile Park access to baseball game stats, video, and remote food ordering during Seattle Mariners games via their Nintendo DS, Nintendo DSi, and later, Nintendo 3DS. It was created due to Nintendo's former ownership of the team.

The Fan Network initially required a $5 fee to access, with a $30 discounted rate for 10 baseball games. However, it became free in 2008. In 2009, the program was updated with additional ESPN news, columns, closed captioning for PA announcements, and a photo-matching game.

Upon the release of the Nintendo DSi, it was announced that the first 150 visitors to home games would receive a free DSi rental to try out the service. The program also became a permanent DSi application instead of being temporarily downloaded onto the system.

When food and drinks are ordered, progress can be viewed on the system.

The service is now defunct. It ended around 2015 or 2016. In addition, the DSi application was removed from the DSi Shop with its discontinuation, and was removed from the Nintendo 3DS eShop at an unknown date.
