= Kurikin Nano Island Story =

2007 video game

- Cover art
- Developer: MediaKite
- Publisher: Nintendo
- Platform: Nintendo DS
- Release: JP: May 24, 2007
- Genre: Role-playing video game
- Mode: Single-player

Kurikin Nano Island Story (くりきん ナノアイランドストーリー) is a role-playing video game developed by MediaKite and published by Nintendo for the Nintendo DS. It was released only in Japan on May 24, 2007.

== Gameplay ==
You play as a student (either male or female) at Nano Academy, a school located on Nano Island. This island is home to an abundance of around 100 species of bacteria. There are three types of bacteria: Solid (ソリッド), Edge (エッジ), and Veil (ヴェール). To collect them, you must use the stylus to absorb a small amount of living matter in certain areas around Nano Island, like plants, dirt, water and even man-made objects. When one kind is found, the bacteria can be raised and then used in battle. Sometimes when two different species of bacteria touch each other during battles, they create a new species. The game includes a story mode for single players. Each of the 24 chapters starts off by giving you a mission. With your goal all set, you head off on a search of the island to speak to people and gather information. As you advance through the missions, you'll end up getting in battle with rival bacteria.

=== Battle system ===
Unlike Pokémon and other monster battle RPGs, the battles in this game are group based. Rather than controlling a single bacteria, you control a group of the pixel-sized creatures in a face-off against a group of equally tiny foes. During a battle, the touch screen shows an overhead view of the entire battlefield, which takes on different shapes depending on the battle at hand. To control your bacteria group, you draw circles around the section that you want to move. Follow this with a straight line, and the bacteria move off in the intended direction. You also can blow into the microphone to scatter groups of bacteria that you've circled in order for them to have enough space to reproduce themselves.

Depending on the type of battle, the goal in battle is to either destroy all of your opponent's bacteria or to have more bacteria than your opponent at the end of the time limit. Killing off all your rivals won't be as easy as it sounds, as the bacteria replicate over time. All the gameplay during battle appears to take place on the bottom screen. Meanwhile, the top screen shows a close-up view of the action, allowing you to get a closer look at the game's creature design. You're free to move a viewing window around the touch screen to get a full view of the action from the top screen.
