= Touch Solitaire =

2009 video game

- Developer: Nintendo
- Publisher: Nintendo
- Platform: Nintendo DSi
- Release: JP: January 28, 2009; NA: January 11, 2010; PAL: September 11, 2009
- Genre: Solitaire
- Mode: Single-player

Touch Solitaire, released in Japan as Solitaire DSi (Note: Japanese: ソリティアDSi, Hepburn: Soritia DSi) and PAL territories as 2-in-1 Solitaire, is a solitaire video game developed and published by Nintendo for the Nintendo DSi's DSiWare service. It was released in 2009 in Japan and Europe and 2010 in North America.

== Gameplay ==
Touch Solitaire features two variants of solitaire, Spider and Klondike, which can be played on the touch screen. Two difficulty options are available. The game can be saved any time during gameplay, even when the device is in sleep mode.

== Reception ==
James Newton of Nintendo Life gave the game a 6/10 score, criticizing its lack of any content of note. In comparison, Lucas M. Thomas of IGN praised the game for its cheap price and entertainment value, calling it one of the best games on the DSiWare service.
