= Murder of Ryōta Uemura =

2015 Japanese murder

Ryōta Uemura
- Born: 2002; Oki Islands, Japan
- Died: February 2015 (aged 12–13); Kanagawa Prefecture, Japan
- Cause of death: Slashing on the neck
- Body discovered: 20 February 2015; Kawasaki, Kanagawa Prefecture, Japan
- Known for: Murder and torture victim

Ryōta Uemura (上村 遼太, Uemura Ryōta; 2002–2015) was a 13-year-old Japanese boy who was tortured and murdered in Kawasaki, Kanagawa Prefecture. His body was discovered in the Tama River on 20 February 2015, and the police arrested three boys in relation to the murder on the same day. Two of the suspects told the police that the alleged ringleader was inspired by Jihadi John's killings. It is unclear whether any of the three arrested suspects was the ringleader. The same two suspects also provided details of the circumstances of Uemura's murder.

Prior to his death, Uemura had apparently been refusing to commit crimes for a group of older boys with whom he spent time, and wanted to cut ties with them. At the time of his death, his mother was working as a nurse to support her children.

== Victim ==
Uemura was well known among his friends as a cheerful boy. When he stopped going to school, his teacher called his parents to see if anything was wrong. After his parents divorced, his mother raised him and his four siblings.

== Crime ==
Ryota Uemura was found dead on the banks of the Tama River on February 20, 2015. His neck had been repeatedly hacked at, apparently using a blood-soaked knife that was discovered nearby, after he was repeatedly forced by a gang of three local teens to swim on the freezing day. The same morning, the partly burned remnants of Uemura's clothing were found in a nearby park toilet, in what appeared to be an effort to destroy evidence. The boy’s cellphone was missing.

During the police investigation, the boy deemed the ring leader admitted to killing Uemura with a box cutter and another boy said he stabbed him at the leader's direction, according to the police. A total of 43 knife wounds were inflicted on Uemura's body, including 31 to the neck during the assault, which lasted more than an hour. Populist weekly Shukan Shincho reported the wounds appeared to indicate that whoever killed Ryota may have been trying to decapitate him. "Some investigators suspect (the criminals) watched Internet videos showing the execution of hostages by Islamic State (IS) fighters and sought to mimic them," the magazine said, quoting an unnamed source close to police.

== Prosecution ==
On 27 February 2015, an 18-year-old boy was arrested by Kanagawa Police on suspicion of murder. The teenager's name has not been released because he was legally a minor. Police also obtained arrest warrants for two other teenagers. Local media reports suggest Ryota knew the suspects and had been attacked by them in the past.

On March 19, 2015, the prosecutors sent the three to the Yokohama Family Court. In closed-door juvenile trial sessions at the court, the 18-year-old boy who is considered the ring leader admitted to killing Uemura, while the two others maintained their innocence, according to the sources. On 13 May 2015, the Court decided to send the three teenagers back to the prosecutors, with sources at the Yokohama District Public Prosecutor's Office stating that the trio may be tried as adults depending on the prosecutors' next move.

On 10 February 2016, the Yokohama District Court handed down a sentence of nine to 13 years in prison to 19-year-old, Ryuichi Funahashi, for playing a key role in the murder of Uemura. In giving the so-called indeterminate sentence as stipulated under Juvenile Law, Presiding Judge Hiroko Kondo highlighted the cruelty of the way Uemura was assaulted and killed by Funahashi, who had previously been a part of the same peer group.

The judge stated that "The victim's neck was slashed more than once and he was forced to swim in the river in the middle of winter. This was just so appalling and the cruelty (of the case) stands out." She also determined that Funahashi "bore the heaviest responsibility" for playing a leading role. Funahashi had pleaded guilty to the charges in his trial, determined by a panel of professional and citizen judges.

Prosecutors had demanded a sentence of 10 to 15 years in prison saying he played the leading role in the murder, while his defense counsel pleaded for five to 10 years, citing the possibility of reformation. The defense counsel also insisted that Funahashi did not have "a strong intention to kill," but the judge rejected the argument, saying, "he continued to attack the victim with the accomplices until the victim died." The judge, however, said the defendant's "immaturity" of allowing violence can largely be attributed to the environment he was brought up in and that warrants lessening his responsibility.

On 14 March 2016, The Yokohama District Court on Monday sentenced the second boy, an 18-year-old at the time, to between four and six and a half years in prison for his part.

== Reaction ==
Japanese Prime Minister Shinzō Abe expressed his condolences to the victim's family and vowed that Japan should not have another similar tragedy. It was the third shocking incident in 2015, after a 19-year-old college student killed 77-year-old Tomoko Mori. On 5 March 2015, after Uemura's mother released statements about her son's death, the three boys previously arrested were charged with murder.

== See also ==
- Kobe child murders
- Murder of Aiwa Matsuo
- Murder of Junko Furuta
- Killing of Satomi Mitarai
