= Sasebo schoolgirl murder =

Sasebo schoolgirl murder may refer to:

- Murder of Aiwa Matsuo in 2014
- Killing of Satomi Mitarai in 2004
