= Brain Age =

Video game series by Nintendo

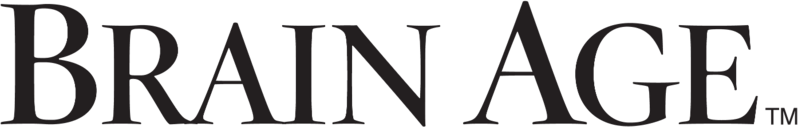
- Former North American logo, used from 2005 to 2012
- Genres: Puzzle, edutainment
- Developers: Nintendo SPD (2005–2012); Nintendo EPD (since 2019)
- Publisher: Nintendo
- Platforms: Nintendo DS, DSiWare, Nintendo 3DS, Nintendo Switch
- First release: Brain Age: Train Your Brain in Minutes a Day! May 19, 2005
- Latest release: Dr Kawashima's Brain Training for Nintendo Switch; December 27, 2019

Brain Age, known as Dr Kawashima's Brain Training in PAL regions, (Note: Known in Japan as Nou wo Kitaeru Otona no Training (Japanese: 脳を鍛える大人のトレーニング; lit. "Brain Training for Adults").) is a series of video games developed and published by Nintendo, based on the work of Ryuta Kawashima.

== Games ==
Release timeline
2005	Brain Age: Train Your Brain in Minutes a Day!
2005	Brain Age 2: More Training in Minutes a Day!
2006–2007
2008	Brain Age Express
2009–2011
2012	Brain Age: Concentration Training
2013–2018
2019	Dr Kawashima's Brain Training for Nintendo Switch

The Brain Age games, known as Brain Training in Japan and Europe, are presented as a set of mini-games that are designed to help improve one's mental processes. These activities were informed by Dr. Ryuta Kawashima, a Japanese neuroscientist, and are aimed to stimulate multiple parts of the brain to help improve one's abilities and combat normal aging effects on the brain. Activities are generally based on two or more mental stimuli and are to be completed as fast and as correctly as possible. For example, common activities include Calculations, where the user is presented with a list of single-operator math operations and the user uses the system's touch screen to write their answer to each question, and Stroop Test based on the Stroop effect, where players are presented with the name of a color, but written in a different color. The user must say into the unit's microphone the color of the text, rather than the text itself. Activities are usually presented in both a Training mode, which allows the user to practice to get the hang of how the activities are played out and a Brain Age Check, where the user completes multiple activities outside of practice, with the game estimating the person's "brain age" based on how quickly they completed all the tests and accounting for any incorrect answers. The game tracks a user's performance over time to help show the effects of daily interactions with the game.

=== Brain Age: Train Your Brain in Minutes a Day! ===
This is the first game in the series. It contains a Quick Play mode, a Daily Training mode, and a Sudoku mode. The game can also be played competitively with up to 16 others in the Download Play mode.

=== Brain Age 2: More Training in Minutes a Day! ===
This game is similar to the first game but has new puzzles. It also contains the same game modes as the previous game.

=== Brain Age Express ===
Brain Age Express is a series of 3 downloadable games for the Nintendo DSi. It contains Math, Arts & Letters, and Sudoku. However, following the closure of the Nintendo 3DS's storefront, which had DSi games on it, these games are no longer obtainable through legal means.

=== Brain Age: Concentration Training ===
Concentration Training is a game for the Nintendo 3DS. It focuses more on training the user's concentration, instead of their overall brain. The game features a new Devilish Training mode, where the player does certain tasks designed to help your concentration ability. This game also has Supplemental Training mode, a mode consisting of mini-games from the previous games designed to help the speed of the player's working memory, and Brain Training mode, which is similar to the previous games but has new minigames.

=== Dr Kawashima's Brain Training for Nintendo Switch ===
A new Brain Age title for the Nintendo Switch, titled Nō o Kitaeru Otona no Nintendo Switch Training (脳を鍛える大人のNintendo Switchトレーニング; lit. Nintendo Switch Brain Training for Adults), and as Dr Kawashima's Brain Training for Nintendo Switch for Europe and Australia, was released in Japan on December 27, 2019, and was released in Europe and Australia on January 3, 2020. The game uses some of the new features of the Switch, including the gyroscope and infrared camera in the Joy-Con units, as part of the input into the activities, alongside other returning training activities. A Switch-compatible stylus was also released that day in Japan to support some of those activities.

== Common elements ==
=== Sudoku ===
The North American, European and Korean versions of the first two Brain Age titles featured a Sudoku mode. The player can choose between two modes of play – with notification, or without. When played with notification, the game allows the player to miss only five times before the puzzle is automatically ended before completion. Each miss results in a 20-minute penalty which is added to the player's time. Additionally, if the best time for a puzzle was achieved with notification, the game will make note of that next to the best time.

The majority of the puzzle takes place on the touch screen, which displays the entire Sudoku puzzle. The player must first tap on the square he wishes to fill in, and the touch screen will show a zoomed-in image of that square while the other screen shows a zoomed out version of the puzzle. While zoomed in, you are able to move to another square next to it by using one of the arrows. To fill in a square, the player must handwrite the number using the stylus. Once the number is written and the player moves on from that square, it will be converted into a cleaner version of the number.

Brain Age also takes advantage of a strategy used in pen and paper Sudoku puzzles, in which the person marks which squares a number could possibly be by writing a miniature number. There are also four options at the player's disposal – Undo, Erase, Zoom Out, and Save & Quit. Undo allows the player to revert the latest change in the puzzle, Erase allows the player to erase everything in one square (alternatively, the player can circle just one number to erase it), Zoom Out is used to go back to a zoomed-out view after the player has zoomed in on a square, and Save & Quit allows the player to do a quick save and quit the puzzle, which is erased once the player resumes.

A DSiWare version of this game entitled Brain Age Express: Sudoku was released in the PAL regions on July 24, 2009, and in North America on August 17, 2009., but it was retired from the DSi Shop on June 19, 2015.

== Sales ==
The first two games in the series reached a combined total of 33 million units sold globally.

== Other media ==
A book based on Kawashima's work was released, titled Train Your Brain: 60 Days to a Better Brain, along with a sequel called Train Your Brain More: 60 Days to an Even Better Brain

Body and Brain Connection, also known as Dr. Kawashima's Body and Brain Exercises in PAL regions, is a puzzle video game developed and published by Namco Bandai Games for the Xbox 360's Kinect platform. It was released in 2010. The player is guided through the brain age tests by Ryuta Kawashima.

== See also ==
- Brain training
