= Akio Mori =

Japanese physiologist, sports scientist and writer

- 森 昭雄
- Born: February 5, 1947 (age 79); Hokkaidō, Japan
- Occupations: Writer, professor
- Known for: The physiology investigations of cats, the institution of the Japanese Society of Health and Behavior Sciences and the books of his pedagogy research in the context of the brain science

Akio Mori (森 昭雄, Mori Akio; born February 5, 1947, in Hokkaidō) is a Japanese physiologist, sports scientist and writer. He is also the founder and the former head of the Japanese learned society Japanese Society of Health and Behavior Sciences (日本健康行動科学会, Nihon Kenkō Kodō Kagakukai).

Mori was originally known for his physiology researches, but began to write books about human neuroscience, coining the term "game brain" in his 2002 book Game Nō no Kyōfu (ゲーム脳の恐怖, Gēmu Nō no Kyōfu; "The Fear of Game Brain"). He claimed that the brains of people who played video games were physically damaged. Game Nō no Kyōfu received much attention from critics such as Tamaki Saitō.

Mori's activities expanded into other genres such as journalism and politics due to the popularity of his books, though his theory about human brains was pointed out to be pseudoscientific. Japanese critic Hiroo Yamagata compared the book Game Nō no Kyōfu with the following movement of Messages from Water because those theories became popular via Japanese mass media without scientific backgrounds.

== Life and career ==
=== 1969–2002: Early career and research ===
Born in Hokkaidō, Mori graduated from the College of Humanities and Sciences of the Nihon University in 1969 and graduated from the Graduate School of Literatures of the Nihon University in 1971. Getting the academic degree Doctor of Medicine, he became a professor of the Nihon University, though he toured the Rockefeller University as a researcher and the Queen's University as a visiting scholar before that.

Originally, Mori was known for his scientific researches about cats' physiology such as the collaborative work "Input-output relationships in cat's motor cortex after pyramidal section" released in 1981, the collaborative work "Low threshold motor effects produced by stimulation of area preinsularis (2pr.i) of the secondary sensory cortex in the cat; Input-output relationships" released in 1983, the collaborative work "Physiological properties and patterns of projection in the cortico-cortical connections from the second somatosensory cortex to the motor cortex, area 4 gamma, in the cat" released in 1989, the collaborative work "Fifth somatosensory cortex (SV) representation of the whole body surface in the medial bank of the anterior suprasylvian sulcus of the cat" released in 1991, the collaborative work "Low-threshold motor effects produced by stimulation of the facial area of the fifth somatosensory cortex in the cat" released in 1993, the collaborative work "The ipsilateral and contralateral connections of the fifth somatosensory area (SV) in the cat cerebral cortex" released in 1996, and his solo work "Cortico-cortical connections from somatosensory areas to the motor area of the cortex following peripheral nerve lesion in the cat" released in 1997.

On March 26, 2000, Mori was awarded the commendation certificate Einen Kinzoku (永年勤続; lit. "Long-Year Working") by the Nihon University for working with the University for 30 years. He also researched the human actions of sports such as kendo along with two other researchers, announcing the collaborative work "Two types of movement-related cortical potentials preceding wrist extension in humans" via the journal NeuroReport in July 2001. He established the Japanese Society of Health and Behavior Sciences in 2002, becoming the board chairperson of the society. It was later admitted as an associated party by the Japanese scientific organization, Science Council of Japan, on April 13, 2006.

Mori attained the degree of Doctor of Medicine, but did not become interested in researching the relationships between video games and human neuroscience until he met a programmer of computer software around 2000 when he made a new electroencephalograph.

=== 2002–present: Literary career and political activities ===
On July 10, 2002, the Japan Broadcast Publishing (or NHK Shuppan) published the independent book Game Nō no Kyōfu, written by Mori, as a part of the Seikatsujin Shinsho (生活人新書; lit. "Life Human New Book") series. According to the 2006 interview to Shiro Hayashi (林 史郎, Hayashi Shirō), the chief editor of Seikatsujin Shinsho, Game Nō no Kyōfu sold over 100,000 copies, becoming the best-selling book of the series. Additionally, the book was translated into traditional Chinese characters under the title Xiao Xin Dian Wan Nao! in 2005. Mori commenced research into the effects of video games on a child's mind. He has cited various violent crime committed by juveniles who played video games to support his position. His position is that playing video games can cause damage to a child's brain, but the theory was heavily criticized.

In 2004, Mori also claimed that the brains of people who used mobile e-mails were also damaged, calling those "mail brain" (メール脳, mēru nō).

On October 19, 2004, the Computer Entertainment Supplier's Association announced that the neuroscientific works of Mori and Ryuta Kawashima about video games had insufficient evidence to claim something. In 2005, however, Mori and Kawashima took part in a series of convocations, held by the Ministry of Education, Culture, Sports, Science and Technology of Japan as a part of its activities for creating its guidelines of Japanese schools' operation.

In addition, Mori's book Genki na Nō no Tsukurikata: Ningen Rashisa o Hagukunde Suteki na Otona ni Narutameni (元気な脳のつくりかた―人間らしさを育んで、すてきな大人になるために; "The Way to Make the Healthy Brains: For Nurturing Humanities and Becoming Beautiful Adults"), published on August 1, 2006, was selected as the Japan National Council of Parent-Teacher Association's "recommended book" at that time.

Mori also recommend Iida Denshi's Nōchō series highly as intelligible goods with his research. The series are CDs recording the speeches such as Heart Sutra and won the creative award at the Utsukushima Monozukuri awards presented by Fukushima Prefecture in January 2007.

In 2008, Mori resigned from the head of the Japanese Society of Health and Behavior Sciences, being replaced by Shinji Murakami of Hokkaido University.

On April 16, 2008, Senichi Club, a communication club comprising the readers of Sekai Nippō, the Japanese division of the World Times, invited Mori over a lecture meeting at Shibuya, in which Mori cited India as an advanced country of information technology.

Since the professors in different fields such as literatures took part in the brain science when the theory of game brain was becoming popular, the Japan Neuroscience Society announced the new ethical code on January 8, 2010, seeking the scientific sources against the groundless theories.

== Published works ==
=== Independent books ===
- Mori, Akio (July 2002). Game Nō no Kyōfu (ゲーム脳の恐怖, Gēmu Nō no Kyōfu; "The Fear of Game Brain") (Japan Broadcast Publishing) ISBN 4-14-088036-8
- Mori, Akio (July 2004). IT ni Korosareru Kodomotachi: Manen Suru Game Nō (ITに殺される子どもたち―蔓延するゲーム脳, Aitī ni Korosareru Kodomotachi Man'ensuru Gēmu Nō; "Children Killed by Information Technology: Spreading Game Brain") (Kodansha) ISBN 4-06-212475-0
- Mori, Akio (August 2006). Genki na Nō no Tsukurikata: Ningen Rashisa o Hagukunde Suteki na Otona ni Narutameni (元気な脳のつくりかた―人間らしさを育んで、すてきな大人になるために; "The Way to Make the Healthy Brains: For Nurturing Humanities and Becoming Beautiful Adults") (Juniors' Visual Journal) ISBN 4-87981-222-6
- Mori, Akio (September 2007). "Nōryoku" Teika Shakai: IT to Game wa Kodomo ni Nani o Motarasuka (「脳力」低下社会―ITとゲームは子どもに何をもたらすか, Nōryoku Teika Shakai: Aitī to Gēmu wa Kodomo ni Nani o Motarasuka; "Brain Power Declining Society: What Information Technology and Game Effect on Children") (PHP Institute) ISBN 4-569-69400-4

=== Journal articles ===
- Shimamura, Muneo & Mori, Akio (1982). "Sensory evoked potentials and their changes with respiration in man and cat". Electroencephalography and Clinical Neurophysiology. Supplement. 36: 297–304. PMID 6962025.
- Mori, A.; Waters, R.S.; Asanuma, H. (1983). "Low threshold motor effects produced by stimulation of area preinsularis (2pr.i) of the secondary sensory cortex in the cat; Input-output relationships". Experimental Brain Research. 51 (1): 108–16. doi:10.1007/BF00236808. PMID 6309545. S2CID 6134155.
- Mori, A.; Babb, R.S.; Waters, R.S.; Asanuma, H. (1985). "Motor effects produced by stimulation of secondary somatosensory (SII) cortex in the monkey". Experimental Brain Research. 58 (3): 440–2. doi:10.1007/BF00235861. PMID 4007087. S2CID 23570136.
- Mori, A; Waters, RS; Asanuma, H (1989). "Physiological properties and patterns of projection in the cortico-cortical connections from the second somatosensory cortex to the motor cortex, area 4γ, in the cat". Brain Research. 504 (2): 206–10. doi:10.1016/0006-8993(89)91358-9. PMID 2598023. S2CID 42165456.
- Mori, A; Hanashima, N; Tsuboi, Y; Hiraba, H; Goto, N; Sumino, R (1991). "Fifth somatosensory cortex (SV) representation of the whole body surface in the medial bank of the anterior suprasylvian sulcus of the cat". Neuroscience Research. 11 (3): 198–208. doi:10.1016/0168-0102(91)90043-X. PMID 1661871. S2CID 27266213.
- Mori, Akio; Fuwa, Tatsu; Kawai, Akira; Yoshimoto, Toshiaki; Hiraba, Yasuo; Uchiyama, Yasushi; Minejima, Takao (1996). "The ipsilateral and contralateral connections of the fifth somatosensory area (SV) in the cat cerebral cortex". NeuroReport. 7 (14): 2385–7. doi:10.1097/00001756-199610020-00021. PMID 8951857.
- Mori, Akio (1997). "Cortico-cortical connections from somatosensory areas to the motor area of the cortex following peripheral nerve lesion in the cat". NeuroReport. 8 (17): 3723–6. doi:10.1097/00001756-199712010-00013. PMID 9427358. S2CID 32691719.
- Kita, Yasunori; Mori, Akio; Nara, Masayuki (2001). "Two types of movement-related cortical potentials preceding wrist extension in humans". NeuroReport. 12 (10): 2221–5. doi:10.1097/00001756-200107200-00035. PMID 11447338. S2CID 41624946.

== See also ==
- Game brain
- Ryuta Kawashima
- Masaru Emoto
- Video game controversy
