= Murder of Yasuko Watanabe =

1997 murder in Harajuku, Shibuya, Tokyo, Japan

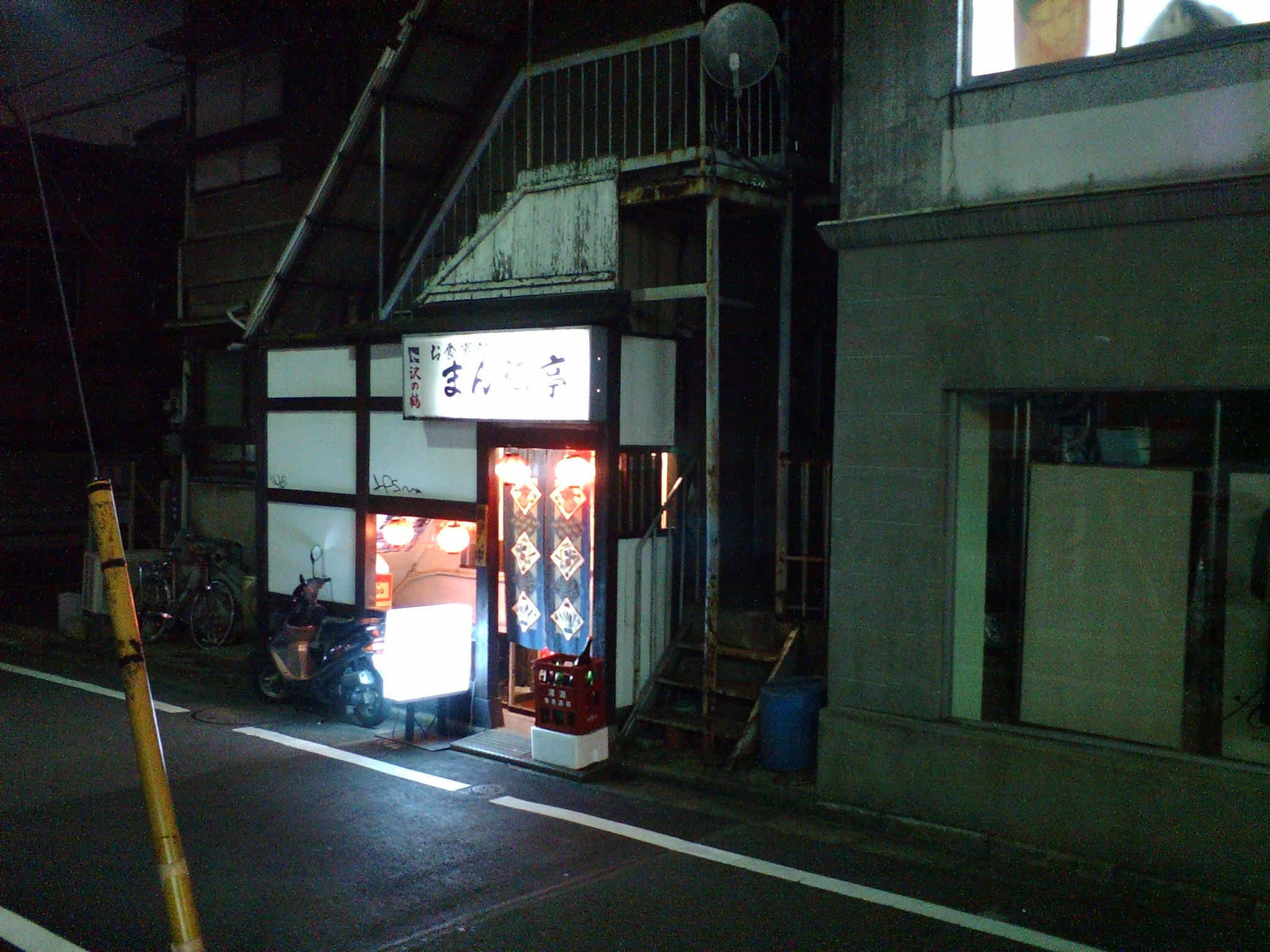
- The apartment where the murder took place
- Location: Harajuku, Shibuya, Tokyo, Japan
- Date: March 9, 1997
- Weapon: Possibly rope
- Deaths: 1
- Victims: Yasuko Watanabe, 39
- Perpetrator: Unknown

Yasuko Watanabe
- 渡辺泰子
- Born: 7 June 1957; Tokyo, Japan
- Died: 9 March 1997 (aged 39); Harajuku, Shibuya, Tokyo, Japan
- Cause of death: Strangulation
- Body discovered: 19 March 1997; Maruyamachō, Shibuya, Tokyo, Japan
- Occupation: TEPCO Worker

Yasuko Watanabe (渡邉 泰子, Watanabe Yasuko; June 7, 1957 – March 9, 1997) was a 39-year-old unmarried Japanese woman, a senior economic researcher at the Tokyo Electric Power Company (TEPCO) moonlighting as a prostitute on the streets by night. She fell victim to murder by strangulation and rape by an unknown assailant in Harajuku, Shibuya on March 9, 1997. After being reported missing by her mother with whom she lived, her body was discovered on March 19, 1997 in a vacant apartment in the Maruyamachō neighborhood of Shibuya, Tokyo where she engaged in prostitution.

During the investigation it was discovered that she had kept a detailed journal of her many clients, including dates, times and fees.

== Investigation ==
Govinda Prasad Mainali (ゴビンダ・プラサド・マイナリ), one of several Nepalese roommates sharing an apartment unit in the adjoining building, soon became targeted by the Japanese authorities as the prime suspect. He was arrested immediately for the murder, or so it has been reported, though other sources say he was arrested on 22 March 1997 and formally charged with overstaying his visa, and convicted of illegal stay in May 1997 Later in April 2000 he was acquitted on murder charges in the first trial at the district court, due to lack of conclusive evidence, but the Tokyo High Public Prosecutors Office filed an appeal, and in a reversal of judgment he found guilty of murder by the Tokyo High Court, given an indefinite prison sentence on 22 December 2000. Mainali went on to spend fifteen years in prison, until exculpatory sets of DNA evidence emerged linking an unidentified third man who had sexual and violent contact with the victim in the immediate hours before her death. Mainali was released in June 2012, and deported back to his native country, pending the retrial.

More than the murder case itself, the victim's lifestyle was sensationalized as the downfall of an elite careerist from a well-to-do family. Watanabe was an economics graduate of Keio University, earning nearly US$100,000 (Note: 10 million yen converted to less than $100,000 using the exchange rate at the time (120 yen to the dollar)) from her regular job at the major utility firm. Her Tokyo University graduate father also worked for TEPCO as an engineer, but died during her schooling at college.

In June 2012, the retrial was ordered by the Tokyo High Court in the face of new evidence that emerged the previous year. Swabs of semen recovered from inside the victim's body, which the prosecution claimed were too small a sample to analyze using existing technologies at the time, finally underwent DNA testing in July 2011, and ruled out Mainali as its source. The semen's DNA matched a piece of body hair (pubic hair) from the crime scene already established to be from an individual other than Mainali. The DNA was further matched to the blood stain on the Burberry coat the victim was wearing, and the saliva found on the victim's chest. The saliva on her breast was already known to be of O type blood (Mainali is type B), and the prosecution knew it did not match Mainali, but did not present the evidence at trial, and withheld it from the defense attorneys until September 2011.

Japan does not have an equivalent of Brady disclosure rules as in the US, which would have made failure to disclose salient evidence to the defense censurable as prosecutorial misconduct. In 2005, the High Public Prosecutors Office revised its Code of Criminal Procedure requiring prosecutors to present a list of evidence gathered. But the revised code carries no penalties for violations, thus offering little deterrent to prosecutors who may choose to withhold evidence.

Mainali was released shortly after a retrial was granted, but was quickly deported to Nepal by Japanese immigration authorities for his previous visa violation. In November 2012, he was formally acquitted of the crime.

In 2013 Mainali was awarded ¥68 million as compensation for his wrongful imprisonment for fifteen years.

== Literature ==
Noted nonfiction writer Shin'ichi Sano wrote a bestselling book, Tokyo Electric Power Co. Office Lady Murder Case (pub. 2000) following this case. An appreciable segment of women in the workplace in Japan evidently identify with the victim's urge to "sell their bodies" as a reaction to difficult circumstances in their personal lives, dubbed "Yasuko syndrome", or Tōden OL shōkōgun (lit. 'TEPCO Office lady syndrome'), the title of Sano's sequel (2001).

== See also ==
- Grotesque, a novel by Natsuo Kirino
- List of solved missing person cases: 1990s
- List of unsolved murders (1980–1999)
- Tsuitōsha ("mourner"), a mystery novel by Ichi Orihara
