= Grotesque (novel) =

2003 novel by Natsuo Kirino

- First edition
- Author: Natsuo Kirino
- Original title: グロテスク
- Translator: Rebecca Copeland
- Language: Japanese published in English on February 1, 2007
- Genre: Crime, Social mystery
- Publisher: Bungeishunjū (Japan); Harvill Secker (US)
- Publication date: 2003
- Publication place: Japan
- Media type: Print (Hardcover, Paperback) & Audio CD
- Pages: 467pp (hardback)
- ISBN: 1-84343-270-6
- OCLC: 123293449

Grotesque is a 2003 crime novel by Japanese writer Natsuo Kirino, most famous for her novel Out. It was published in English in 2007, translated by Rebecca Copeland. Publisher Knopf censored the American translation, removing a section involving underage male prostitution, as it was considered too taboo for U. S. audiences.

== Plot summary ==
The book is written in the first person and tells the story of a woman whose younger sister and an old school friend are both murdered. The narrator of Grotesque is unnamed and lives under the shadow of her sister Yuriko, who is younger than her by a year, very beautiful and the center of all attention. The narrator hates her because she was always looked down upon when compared with Yuriko.

While the narrator is smart, responsible and plain looking, Yuriko is strikingly beautiful but flighty and irresponsible. However, Yuriko's diary shows she has an ability to think for herself that her sister always denies out of rage. Everyone is drawn to the beauty of Yuriko, and she soon realizes that she has power over men and that she can make money from it. She becomes a full-time prostitute, and declines as she ages. As the novel progresses, the reader is introduced to many other characters with whom the narrator comes in contact at her highly prestigious Q High School.

As time passes, the narrator grows to hate almost everyone, including her classmates, her parents, and her co-workers. This in turn increasingly isolates her, and she ends up moving from one bad job to another.

When both Yuriko and the narrator's old school friend Kazue become prostitutes, they are murdered less than a year apart and in the same gruesome fashion. Then the narrator comes in possession of their personal journals and her life becomes entwined with theirs to the point of meeting and adopting Yuriko's handsome but blind son, Yurio.

In the original Japanese version Yurio becomes a prostitute in order to earn money. The narrator wants to join him but due to her age, she has no customers. For this reason, she becomes Yurio's pimp instead. However, eventually their relationship turns sour. At the end, she decides to take up an offer from a customer who is curious about her being a 40-year old virgin. The English version skips Yurio's incursion into prostitution and the narrator's involvement with his activities. There is a mention of her accepting the offer of her first client, but it is left to the reader's interpretation as to whether this really happens or is a figment of the narrator's imagination.

== Structure and style ==
The novel is divided into 8 parts: parts 1, 2, 4, 6 and 8 are told by the unnamed narrator; part 3 is the journal of Yuriko, the narrator's sister; part 5 is the written report by Zhang who is accused of the two murders; and part 7 is the journal of the narrator's school friend, Kazue Sato.

== Themes ==
Fordham, the reviewer in The Times, writes that the book is about women struggling to be taken seriously by men, and their consequent retreat into "coldness, violence and dehumanisation". All want control in their lives, and seek it in different ways. The reviewer for The Telegraph, however, sees the theme in terms of Japanese society and culture, writing that "Grotesque is not so much a crime novel as a brilliant, subversive character study. Kirino's real concerns are social, not criminal; her true villain is 'the classist society so firmly embedded in Japan' which pushes her protagonists along the road to prostitution".

Overall, then, as well as exploring women's psyches, particularly in terms of their relationships with men, Kirino explores women in the context of Japanese society and how its rigid hierarchy operates against their ability to fully participate within it.

The novel is said to have been loosely modeled on the victim of the unsolved murder of Yasuko Watanabe (aka the TEPCO OL murder case), which occurred on March 9, 1997.
