= Brain Age Express =

2008 video games

- Japanese cover images for the Arts (left) and Math (right) editions
- Developer: Nintendo NSD
- Publisher: Nintendo
- Designer: Ryuta Kawashima
- Composers: Minako Hamano; Shinobu Nagata; Megumi Inoue
- Series: Brain Age
- Platform: Nintendo DSi
- Release: Math: JP: December 24, 2008; NA: April 5, 2009; PAL: June 19, 2009; Arts & Letters: JP: December 24, 2008; NA: August 10, 2009; PAL: October 23, 2009; Sudoku (2009-15): JP: April 22, 2009; NA: August 17, 2009; PAL: July 24, 2009
- Genres: Puzzle, edutainment
- Mode: Single-player

Brain Age Express (known in Japan as Chotto Brain Training^{[a]} and in Europe and Australia as A Little Bit of... Dr Kawashima's Brain Training) are three educational puzzle video games developed and published by Nintendo for the Nintendo DSi's DSiWare download service. They are the third series of games in the Brain Age series, and are repackaged versions of both Brain Age: Train Your Brain in Minutes a Day! and Brain Age 2: More Training in Minutes a Day! games, featuring both old and new puzzles.

There are three editions: Arts & Letters, Math, and Sudoku. The Arts & Letters and Math versions were released on December 24, 2008, in Japan as launch titles for the DSiWare service, and the Sudoku edition on April 22, 2009, in Japan as well. The Math edition is the only version available outside Japan, and was released on April 5, 2009, in North America and June 19, 2009, in the PAL regions, as a launch title for the service. However, the Arts & Letters edition was released on August 10, 2009, in North America and October 23, 2009, in the PAL regions.

The puzzles featured in both the Math and Arts & Letters were created by Ryuta Kawashima. One puzzle in each of these two editions utilizes the Nintendo DSi's camera function, while both versions allow players to use a photo for their in-game profile. On June 19, 2015, Brain Age Express: Sudoku was pulled from the DSi Shop and 3DS eShop, with no official reason given. Brain Age Express: Math and Brain Age Express: Arts & Letters are pre-installed on Japanese and North American Nintendo DSi XLs.

== Gameplay ==
They use similar gameplay concepts to Brain Age: Train Your Brain in Minutes a Day! and Brain Age 2: More Training in Minutes a Day! titles; they both require the player to hold the DS on its side with the top screen on left and the touch screen on right (reverse in lefty mode). Like their predecessors, both versions feature modes called "Brain Age Check" and "Training". In Brain Age Check, where the game uses several training puzzles to test his or her brain age, with the ideal brain age for people 20 or over. Using the DSi's internal clock, both versions allow for only one official Brain Age Check per day. In Training, the player may freely play any game that is available, and is able to compare how well they did with previous days. Each title comes with three new training puzzles, as well as several puzzles taken from the previous Brain Age titles. Both editions include Virus Buster, also known as Germ Buster, a non-training puzzle based on the Dr. Mario series. All of the Games also included a secret "Challenge Mode" that was unlocked if, after a test you got a Brain Age of 20, this mode introduces the "Challenge Keeper", a character that appears to be Dr. Kawashima's alter ego.

=== Brain Age Express: Arts & Letters ===
The Arts & Letters edition (Literature edition in Japan and Arts edition in PAL region) features word and memory puzzles. One new puzzle is called Photo Memory, a memory puzzle, where the game will take a picture from either the game itself or from the player's DSi, show it to the player, and then have the player pick between it and other randomly selected images from the player's folder while showing another image to memorize, and so on. For Brain Age Check, it uses Stroop Test, Connect Maze, Rock, Paper, Scissors, Word Memory, and Symbol Match. The Training mode features puzzles from previous games, these are Reading Aloud, Word Scramble and Piano Player. This game is not available in South Korea and China.

=== Brain Age Express: Math ===
One of the new puzzles available in the Science edition. On the left it shows a player doing math problems as people enter and exit the house; on the right it shows the end of the puzzle, where the player must write how many people are still in the house. This puzzle is called "Multi Tasker".

The Math edition (Science edition in Japan) deals with numbers and math puzzles. The new puzzles included in this edition are Sum Totaled, By the Numbers, and Multi Tasker. The Brain Age Check includes High Number, Speed Counting, Serial Subtraction, Math Recall, and Number Memory. The Training include puzzles from previous games, like Calculations X20, Calculations X100, Triangle Math, and Change Maker.

=== Brain Age Express: Sudoku ===
The Sudoku edition features 100 sudoku puzzles divided into three difficulties: Basic, Medium and Advanced, instead of the Training mode featured on the other editions. It also features a Brain Age Check, with three puzzles: Number Memory, Connect Maze and High Number. This version, unlike the Math and Arts & Letters editions, does not use the DSi camera or microphone. For unknown reasons, it was retired from both the DSi Shop and 3DS eShop on June 19, 2015.

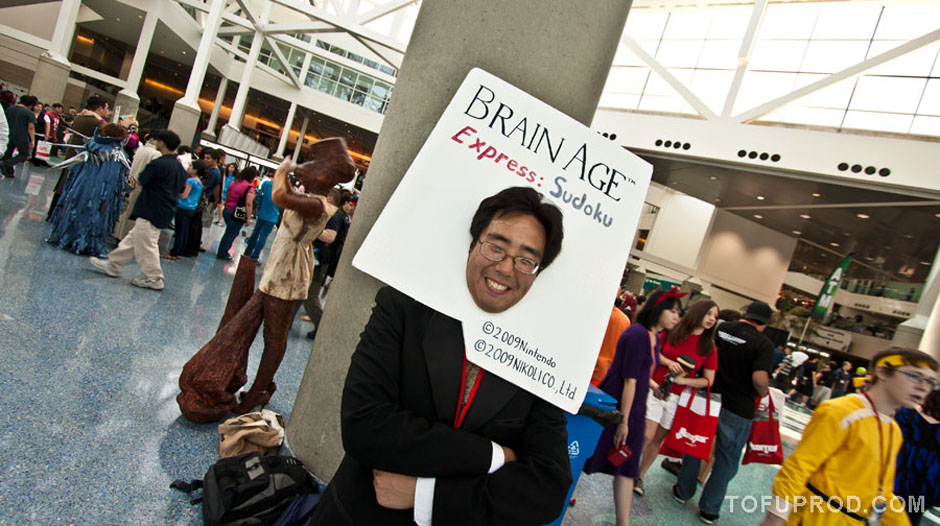
Cosplayer of Brain Age Express: Sudoku title

== Development ==
The two Brain Age Express titles were announced on October 2, 2008, at the reveal of the Nintendo DSi and its DSiWare service and were released on December 24, 2008. The titles were created to be played anywhere at any time. Nintendo chose the most popular puzzles from Brain Age: Train Your Brain in Minutes a Day! and Brain Age 2: More Training in Minutes a Day! to include in the two versions. At the launch of Nintendo DSi in the U.S., Brain Age Express: Math was released at the DSiWare launch while the Sudoku edition is available in Japan on April 22, 2009. This edition along the Literature edition was later released.

The idea for Brain Age Express came from the Download Software Subcommittee meeting back when Nintendo was developing the Nintendo DSi as a console. During the subcommittee, members from a variety of teams came together to come up with small titles that could be downloaded from the Internet as part of a "My DS" brand. The meetings' progress was considerably slow, due to the nature of the Nintendo DSi being undetermined at that point. Several rough ideas were presented, but none stood out, and as a result, possible projects piled up, creating a bad situation. The problem was that none of the ideas were bad, and while they were fun to talk about, some were not very realistic. The Express series, known in PAL regions as the A Little Bit of... series and in Japan as the Chotto series, was proposed, but was unnoticed amongst other proposals. The name was conceived by Satoru Iwata, CEO of Nintendo, jokingly using the name "Chotto! Generations". He stated that while some may find a video game fun, they may also worry that it would be too time-consuming. The series was modelled after the nature of the Brain Age series, which allows for short play times.

Due to complications between Shigeru Miyamoto, a key developer of Nintendo, and Iwata, the developers were having a difficult time getting started with Brain Age Express. In the end, it was decided that Chotto could mean a variety of things, which worked out well for everyone. Koichi Kawamoto, lead developer of Brain Age Express, stated that while the retail Brain Age games, after players collected a stamp for playing through a certain puzzle, they were returned to the stamp calendar. In this version, after collecting the stamp, the players are given the option of either returning to the main menu or to the DSi's menu. The developers wondered how much content could be included for this game to still be considered a Chotto title, as no particular size, standard, or guidelines had been set. When deciding what games to be included, Kawamoto wavered between simply selecting games from previous Brain Age titles or making new ones.

When he was asked whether the number of games was enough, he responded by asking if they should push some new games in the fore, which he thought would be more fun for players. However, as they added, they added so many games that it was bigger than Brain Age 2. However, he couldn't remove any of the games, having taken a liking to them, thinking that plenty of variety was good. Shinya Takahashi, the coordinator of the DSiWare service, suggested splitting the title into two titles, which Kawamoto thought would be hard, but could be done. He suggested two versions - Math version and Arts and Letters version. Kawamoto flew to Sendai, Japan to ask Dr. Ryuta Kawashima, the inspiration for the Brain Age series, to ask if this would be all right. Kawashima gave him his assent, stating that a difference between players' brain ages may arise, and would help them determine whether they are more math- or art-oriented.

The development staff had to consider what to carry over from the previous two Brain Age titles to the Brain Age Express titles. The Brain Age Express titles were a part of the "My DS" theme, which allows players to customize their Nintendo DSis, resulting in people naturally thinking that there would be only one save slot. They did not want to remove the element of communication, so they included the Guest mode. Normally, guests' data is not saved, but in the Brain Age Express titles, certain guest data, including their brain ages drawings, photos, and voices.

A photo comparison game in the Arts and Letters version was described as simple yet difficult by Takahashi and Kawamoto. Two other games include Kanji Shooter and Sum Totaled, which belong to the Arts and Letters and Math versions respectively, involve defeating enemies by writing either kanji or numbers. These are alternate modes to games which are simply kanji- and number-based. They were included due to Kawamoto's love of video games, describing them both as having a "retro games" feel. When the player reaches a brain age of 20 in the Brain Age Express titles, it unlocks a challenge mode. This was in response to Kawashima's disappointment over people quitting once they reach 20 to keep people interested. Kawamoto considers these titles downloadable versions of the previous Brain Age titles rather than a sequel to them.

== Reception ==
In their impressions of the Japanese release of the two original titles in the Brain Age Express series, IGN described the two titles as perfect showpieces for the DSiWare service, due to the eliminating cartridge swapping. Of what they've played, Nintendo has given it the polish that titles in a series that's sold more than ten million copies should, also complimenting them for feeling like full games despite the limited content. IGN editor Craig Harris gave the Math edition a 7.9 out of 10, praising it for feeling like almost as full of a game as the retail releases, comparing its $8.00 price tag to the retail games' $19.99 price tag. However, they found fault in the usage of many puzzles from the retail titles.

== Notes ==
- a : The full Japanese title is 東北大学加齢医学研究所川島隆太教授監修 ちょっと脳を鍛える大人のDSiトレーニング (Tōhoku Daigaku Karei Igaku Kenkyūjo Kawashima Ryuta Kyōju Kanshū Chotto Nō o Kitaeru Otona no DSi Training, (lit. "Tohoku University's Life Extension Research Laboratory's Supervising Professor Ryuta Kawashima's Short Adult Brain Exercises DSi Training")).
