= Brain Age: Concentration Training =

2012 video game

- North American box art
- Developer: Nintendo SPD
- Publisher: Nintendo
- Directors: Noriko Kitamura; Yuichiro Ito
- Producer: Kouichi Kawamoto
- Designers: Tadashi Matsushita; Katsuhiko Kanno
- Artists: Kazuma Norisada; Yuri Adachi; Akira Koizumi
- Composers: Minako Hamano; Shinji Ushiroda; Megumi Inoue; Shinobu Nagata
- Series: Brain Age
- Platform: Nintendo 3DS
- Release: JP: July 28, 2012; NA: February 10, 2013; KOR: September 5, 2013; EU: July 28, 2017; AU: July 29, 2017
- Genres: Puzzle, Edutainment
- Modes: Single-player, multiplayer

Brain Age: Concentration Training,^{JPN} known in Europe and Australia as Dr Kawashima's Devilish Brain Training: Can you stay focused?, is an educational puzzle video game developed and published by Nintendo. It is the fourth major entry in the Brain Age series and the first made specifically for the Nintendo 3DS. It was released in Japan on July 28, 2012, in North America on February 10, 2013, and in South Korea on September 5, 2013. It later came to Europe on July 28, 2017, and Australia on July 29, 2017, five years apart from the initial release. Dr. Kawashima presents the game's purpose as being to counter prevalent subpar concentration skills onset by social media and other aspects of modern life.

Brain Age: Concentration Training features a selection of activities and minigames that are designed to stimulate and improve the player's concentration and working memory interspersed with brief lectures by Dr. Kawashima. Improvements to mental strength supposedly happen as the player advances to levels of higher challenge reflective of the player's current concentration subskill. Amidst training activities, Dr. Kawashima mentors the player.

Aggregate review scores put the game at about 70/100.

== Gameplay ==
There are 3 types of training modes: Devilish Training, Supplemental Training, and Brain Training. Unlike past installments, the 3DS is held in its standard position, rather than sideways (except for Relaxation Mode). The player utilizes the handheld's touchscreen and microphone to perform training and minigames.

In the training mode for the player's working memory, Devilish Training, the player is assigned with a training exercise for 5 minutes. In the exercises, the difficulty is adjusted to match the player's efforts. The difficulty level goes up if the player completes the routine with 85% or more correct, or if both questions are answered correctly. The difficulty level remains the same if the player receives between 84 and 66% correct, or if only one of the questions were answered correctly. The difficulty level decreases if the player receives 65% or less correct, or if both questions were answered incorrectly. In this and all other modes, new content is unlocked gradually as a reward for players returning to the game on subsequent days.

In Supplemental Training, the player completes exercises from the previous Brain Age installments. Unlike Devilish Training, the exercises have the vague aim of improving mental facilities and decreasing the player's "mental age."

In Brain Training, the exercises come in the form of either traditional games, such as Klondike Solitaire, Spider Solitaire, and Mahjong, as well as some exercises returning from the past Brain Age installments.

The game also added Relaxation Mode which allows the player's brain to take a break after training. They include 3 games: Blob Blast and Germ Buster (inspired by Wario's Woods and Dr. Mario respectively), and Music Appreciation, which lets players listen to relaxing music and the rest of the game's soundtrack.

== Development ==
The game was planned to be released in Europe on March 8, 2013, and after to April 12, 2013; however, despite releasing fully localized information on the title, Nintendo of Europe had since announced the game's release being postponed on April 9, 2013.

On April 12, 2017, during a Nintendo Direct, Nintendo announced the release date for Europe. The game was released on July 28, 2017, exactly five years after the original Japanese release. Nintendo Australia later also confirmed a local release in Australia.

== Reception ==
Reception

Aggregate scores
Aggregator	Score
GameRankings	73.33%
Metacritic	69/100

Review scores
Publication	Score
Destructoid	N/A
Game Informer	6/10
GamesRadar+	4/5
IGN	7.8/10
Nintendo Life	8/10
Nintendo World Report	7.5/10

Some gaming journalists were initially antagonistic and skeptical towards Brain Age: Concentration Training. A Destructoid writer rebuked its price in the same paragraph he dismissed the entire series as a craze that has died. Destructoid did, however, comment on the game's willingness to improve any player's memory by an enormous amount. GameRadar+ AU dismissed the game in a way that contradicted Destructoid, quipping that "if you've read [this paragraph] description up until this point, you're likely ahead of the game," implying anyone literate is too intelligent to get much out of the experience. IGN's Mr. Thomas insisted the premise of a "devil doctor" would make the game less appreciated by who he considers to be the target audience of "older, non-gamer adults."

Brain Age: Concentration Training received average critical reviews, gaining aggregate scores of about 70/100 on GameRankings and Metacritic. Both IGN's Thomas as well as Knezevic, an author for GameRadar+, were delighted by the full upgrade in presentation. They felt it was a testament to the difference in the production budget that Dr. Kawashima was fully voiced throughout the experience. They praised the way it made for a "more personal experience." Morgan Sleeper of Nintendo Life called the dynamic difficulty a "fantastic addition," that "really does help with concentration." She went on to praise almost every single element of the game in detail. Thomas remarked that the game succeeded at hooking him (getting him "invested" in improving his working memory across multiple play-sessions). Game Informer's Ryckert noted the variety of content there, regardless of whether the player is thrilled with the main mode.

Ryckert was otherwise unamused and critical of the game. Knezevic and others felt that the letter recognition was "wonky," which was "annoying", however, there is disagreement on whether it impedes gameplay significantly. Some took issue with the reuse of content from previous entries whereas some welcomed the relatively large amount of content within the game. Sleeper panned the secondary modes as "a great deal more mundane," though was warm on the relaxation games. Thomas, in his review, pondered if the flaws and quirks would add up to prevent players from playing the game long enough to make any actual progress on their concentration.

== Notes ==
In Japan, the game is known as Tohoku University Institute of Development, Aging and Cancer Professor and Supervisor Ryuta Kawashima's Tough 5-Minute Brain Training with Demon Training (東北大学加齢医学研究所 川島隆太教授監修 ものすごく脳を鍛える5分間の鬼トレーニング, Tōhoku Daigaku Karēigakukenkyūjo Kawashima Ryūta Kyōju Kanshū: Monosugoku Nō o Kitaeru Go Funkan no Oni Torēningu).
