= Body and Brain Connection =

2010 video game

- Developer: Namco Bandai Games
- Publisher: Namco Bandai Games (Note: Released under the Namco label.)
- Platform: Xbox 360
- Release: JP: November 20, 2010; NA: February 8, 2011; EU: February 11, 2011
- Genres: Puzzle, edutainment
- Modes: Single player, multiplayer

Body and Brain Connection, also known as Dr. Kawashima's Body and Brain Exercises in PAL regions, is a puzzle video game developed and published by Namco Bandai Games for the Xbox 360's Kinect platform. It was released in Japan on November 20, 2010, in North America on February 8, 2011, and in Europe on February 11, 2011.

The game features mental problems, such as math questions, in order to keep the user's brain active; in order to answer the questions, the player must perform various physical motions. It received mostly mixed reviews from critics.

== Gameplay ==
A player uses the motion controls to select which mathematical expression is greater than the other.

Body and Brain Connection is a puzzle game which asks mental questions but requires that the answers be performed through physical actions. The game's goal is to reinforce the mental answers by having them be drilled into the player by playing with motion controls. When the player starts the game, it allows the player to take a test which lasts for about ten minutes to determine their "Brain Age", much like the Nintendo DS video game Brain Age does. The player is guided through the brain age tests by Ryuta Kawashima, who also appeared in Brain Age.

Games are usually short exercises that last only for a few minutes. Some of the games include a math game which requires the player to make hand motions in either a "greater than" or "less than" sign and a game which makes the user kick a ball into the goal with the right answer for a math question. Multiplayer is included with the game.

== Reception ==
Body and Brain Connection received mostly mixed reviews from critics; it received a 57.5% from GameRankings. GameSpot's Chris Watters called the game "shallow and flawed" for its lack of content, but noted that it successfully used Kinect in a "novel way". The Daily Telegraph's Tom Hoggins noted that the game successfully created a new genre called "mathercise", a portmanteau of exercise and mathematics, but felt that the game was weaker than Brain Age because it was attached to a console. Sarah Ditum in The Guardian criticized the game's single player as "slightly sinister" for the mean comments the game makes after bad playthroughs, but praised the game's multiplayer a fun minigame collection. GamePro's Eric Neigher praised the game for bringing something new to the brain-training genre, but criticized the game as not "living up to its potential" and having games too similar to others in the genre. G4 Canada's John Powell felt that the minigames were uninspired, despite his praise for their use of the Kinect system.
