= Real World (novel) =

2003 novel by Natsuo Kirino

- First edition
- Author: Natsuo Kirino
- Translator: Philip Gabriel
- Language: Japanese
- Genre: Crime novel
- Publisher: Shueisha (Japanese); Vintage Books (English)
- Publication date: Feb 2003
- Publication place: Japan
- English publication date: July 15, 2008
- Media type: Print (Paperback, Hardcover)
- Pages: 208 pp (paperback edition), 224 pp (hardcover)
- ISBN: 978-0-307-26757-3

Real World (Japanese: リアルワールド, Hepburn: Riaru Wārudo) is a 2003 novel by Japanese author Natsuo Kirino, published by Shueisha. The English translation by Philip Gabriel was published by Vintage Books on July 15, 2008.

The story describes the lives of four teenage girls (Toshi, Terauchi, Yuzan, and Kirarin) and how they deal with a teenage boy, nicknamed "Worm," who goes on the run after being accused of murdering his mother. It is a mosaic novel, featuring the perspectives of all five teenagers. The action takes place in a suburb of Tokyo.

According to Barbara E. Thornbury, "The English term "real world"—phonetically transcribed into Japanese using the katakana syllabary—is a complex signifier that simultaneously expresses resigned acceptance and angry resistance."

== Background ==
The story takes its inspiration from two murders committed in 1997 by a fourteen-year-old high school student using the alias "Sakakibara Seito."

== Plot ==
The novel starts from Toshi's perspective. She hears loud crashes coming from Worm's house, and suspects a robbery. Terauchi suggests that it might be a fight between the wife and husband. She convinces Toshi to ignore the crashes, stating that it's not their concern.

Soon after, Toshi leaves for cram school on her bicycle. She sees Worm, who looks uncharacteristically happy. He speaks to her for the first time, commenting on the hot weather. Toshi mentions the loud sound she heard, and Worm tells her she must be mistaken.

After leaving cram school, Toshi discovers that her bike and mobile phone have gone missing. She learns from her friends that a boy has been answering her phone, and making calls from it. Toshi suspects that Worm has stolen her belongings.

Meanwhile, police suspect Worm of matricide. They question Toshi, but she resolves not to tell them anything.

Yuzan provides Worm with a bicycle and a cell phone to aid his getaway.

Worm calls Kirarin, and invites her to meet him at a train station. She is initially willing to go with him, but when she later appears hesitant, Worm threatens her with a knife. Kirarin pays for a love hotel, where the two spend the night. He makes sexual advances on Kirarin, but she rejects him. Her friends call her, worried, but Kirarin assures them that everything is alright.

Worm's matricide dominates the news cycle. He begins to grow concerned about his legacy. After learning that the girls regard Terauchi as the smartest amongst them, Worm calls her and demands that she ghostwrite a final manifesto for him. Terauchi refuses at first, but agrees after Worm threatens to harm Kirarin.

Police are searching for Worm and Kirarin, and they are labelled runaways. Terauchi is the first and only one of the group to aid this search. She anonymously informs the police of Worm and Kirarin's location.

Worm and Kirarin notice the police presence, and decide to leave the area. They have sex in a public park at night, but stop to run away from a policeman. They hail a taxi and head for Worm's house. When the taxi driver grows suspicious, Worm reveals his knife. Both he and Kirarin threaten the driver. To stop Worm and Kirarin from escaping the police, the driver swerves the car off the road. The resultant car accident injures Worm, and kills both Kirarin and the driver.

Upon finding out about Kirarin's death, Terauchi resolves to commit suicide. She leaves behind a letter addressed to Toshi. In the letter, Terauchi takes responsibility for Kirarin's death.

At Terauchi's funeral, Toshi is again approached by the police. They casually speculate that the girls worked together to help Worm evade the police, which angered Terauchi, and led to her calling in the anonymous tip. Toshi is taken aback at how ridiculous it all sounds when put into words. She feigns ignorance again.

When Toshi gets home, she finds a letter from Kirarin's ex-boyfriend addressed to her. The letter describes his relationship with Kirarin, and his belief that the living have a responsibility to "live and imagine." Toshi is certain that she, Worm, and Yuzan will remember Kirarin and Terauchi for the rest of their lives.

== Characters ==
=== Toshi ===
Toshi's full name is Toshika Yamanaka. She often uses the alias Ninna Hori, so much so that it feels like "a real second name" to her. Toshi feels that the alias is a weapon, protecting her from the adult world. However, by the end, Toshi resolves to never use her alias again. Toshi distrusts adults. She does not have Terauchi's experience of being sexually harassed, but relates to "being targeted" in other ways. She states that her parents are good people, but incapable of understanding how Toshi has been "assaulted by commercialism." Initially, Toshi empathises with Worm. Her kindness is often noted by other characters, especially Terauchi.

=== Terauchi ===
Terauchi's full name is Kazuko Terauchi. She dislikes her first name, and insists that her friends call her Terauchi. According to Toshi, Terauchi is a "cute-looking girl" with a "low and cool" voice, and the "smartest and most interesting" in their friend group. Her intelligence is often underestimated, usually by men, because of her good looks. Terauchi has been harassed by stalkers and perverts since elementary school. Terauchi performs well academically, but Toshi worries that "someday her cleverness might really get her in trouble." In her suicide note, Terauchi writes that she is a "superphilosophical kind of person" and that it makes her life miserable.

=== Yuzan ===
Yuzan's full name is Kiyomi Kaibara. Her feminine name contradicts her masculine personality and manner of speaking. Her nickname comes from the Oishinbo character Yuzan Kaibara. She is a lesbian, and feels disconnected from her friends and family because of this. Yuzan doesn't know that Toshi, Terauchi, and Kirarin are already aware of this. Yuzan has "extreme likes and dislikes" and can be difficult to predict. She is extremely loyal to the people she likes. When Yuzan was in junior high, her mother died after a long stay in hospital; after this, Yuzan "started acting more eccentric, even more like a guy."

=== Kirarin ===
Kirarin's full name is Kirari Higashiyama. She is described by Toshi as "cute, cheerful, a well-brought-up, proper young girl." She is the only one in their friend group who could "fit in nicely wherever she went." When Worm first called her, they "ended up talking about all kinds of things." Kirarin leads a double life. She has another group of friends with whom she frequently drinks and parties. However, Terauchi and Yuzan are aware that Kirarin often gets "picked up by guys" in Shibuya. Kirarin is experienced in using her sexuality to her advantage. For example, she initially seduces Worm by acting innocent, convincing him to meet her in person. Kirarin is still in love with Wataru, a boy she used to date. While they were together, he cheated on her, and then ended the relationship. Her recollections of him are both bitter and tender.

=== Worm ===
Toshi describes Worm as "a lanky, stoop-shouldered boy with small, gloomy eyes." He seems perpetually dispirited, and "like he could hide from the world." This changes immediately after he kills his mother. Toshi then describes him "happy and excited, like he was going off on a date." He appears so vibrant that the nickname "Worm" seems unfitting to her. Worm attends one of the top high schools in Tokyo, but ranks near the bottom of his cohort. He resents his mother for pushing him towards academic success. He also resents her for discovering his perversions: she insisted that the family relocate after she caught Worm trying to steal a neighbour's underwear. Before meeting Kirarin, Worm was a virgin, and had no experience with girls or dating.

== Reception ==
An anonymous reviewer writing for Kirkus Reviews found the novel to be "Exasperating:"

"The fact that [the characters'] brutal idiocy varies in quantity, rather than in quality, from that of the typical teen should be a source of horror as events spin irretrievably out of control. The grandiose self-pity and sheer foolishness of these kids is believable but frustrating: The desire to take away their texting privileges and send them to bed without supper quickly overtakes the desire to keep reading. At the same time, the language in which their dialogue is rendered is often stiff and unconvincing."

However, Emma Hagestadt, in The Independent, praised Gabriel's translation.

Publishers Weekly was more positive in their assessment: "Kirino uses her considerable narrative gifts to evoke the tedium, pressure and angst her teenage characters suffer. Some readers, though, may find the proceedings just too grim for their taste."

The Complete Review gave the novel a B−: " . . . the book feels overcrowded and the characters underdeveloped: five is too many to juggle adequately here, at least the way Kirino does it . . . Kirino's Japan a world where everything seems broken, most obviously families and youth. Worm's actions are extreme, but the way the girls act is equally disturbing and unpleasant . . . it's an interesting picture of contemporary Japan . . . but overall it's far from satisfying."

Kathryn Hemmann, in Chapter 10 of Rethinking Japanese Feminisms, writes "The unhappy endings of these girls’ stories may thus be understood as a form of literary attack against cultural double standards that allow no middle ground for young women to negotiate their own identities as they move into adulthood."

== Adaptation ==
Real World will be adapted into a stage play in 2027, directed by American actor John Malkovich. It will be performed in six cities across Japan.

== See also ==
- Suicide in Japan
