= Game brain =

Long-term effect of playing video games on the human brain

Game brain (ゲーム脳, Gēmu nō) is a term coined by Akio Mori referring to human brains affected by the long-term effect of playing video games. Mori, a professor in the Humanities and Sciences division of Nihon University in Japan, coined the term and presented the concept in his 2002 book The Terror of Game Brain (ゲーム脳の恐怖, Gēmu Nō no Kyōfu). It has been criticized by neuroscientists as pseudoscientific.

== Summary ==
Example of an EEG reading filtered to display beta waves

Mori performed an experiment at Tokyo's Nihon University designed to measure the effect of video games on human brain activity by examining beta waves, which are produced during beta states – the states associated with normal waking consciousness. Mori claims that his study has revealed that people who spend long periods playing video games exhibit less activity in the brain's prefrontal region, which is important for emotional processing, planning, and self-control. He claims that the experiment demonstrates the existence of an "adverse effect that video games have on the human brain". Mori asserts that side effects can include loss of concentration, an inability to control temper, and problems socializing or associating with others. If the subject persists gaming over a long period of time, Mori concluded that the alterations in the subject’s brain could eventually develop into a permanent effect. Game brain refers to these effects and the state of the brain.

His theory has gained some recognition in popular culture, especially among parents who believe that video gaming can have detrimental effects on child development. It has, in many instances, affected local policy and decision-making regarding the selling of games to minors. Often, when cases of juvenile delinquency and child misbehavior are suspected to be a result of over-exposure to video games, Japanese media suggested game brain as a possible explanation. Mori insisted that use of the internet was the cause of the Sasebo slashing.

== Criticism ==
Mori's theory was criticized by established neuroscientists and brain specialists as unwarranted research because he relied on unreliable measures and misinterpreted fluctuations in beta waves. One of his critics, Dennis Schutter, a neuroscientist specializing in the EEG signatures of different emotional states, has stated, "My guess is that fatigue is the most likely cause of the absence of the beta waves and not the gaming per se."

Mori's book was nominated for the Japan Outrageous Book Award (日本トンデモ本大賞, Nihon Tondemo-bon Taishō) in 2003. Ryuta Kawashima, a Japanese neuroscientist who later developed the game Brain Age: Train Your Brain in Minutes a Day!, claimed that game brain was "a complete superstition and delusion." Kawashima's research with video games found that different types of games use different parts of the brain. He saw that some games may suppress activity in certain parts of the brain, but others activate those same areas.

There are controversies over violent video games around the world, but his theory is limited to Japan. Professor Akira Baba of the graduate school of the University of Tokyo pointed out that even shogi player Yoshiharu Habu probably has game brain under his theory.

Japanese neuroscientist Tadaharu Tsumoto stated in 2006 that it should be disregarded.

Studies in Japan have diminished, while numerous studies in America have furthered the world's understanding of how video games affect the brain. With access to media devices, the influence on "game brain" is strong due to their widespread use. The introduction of violence in the form of games at a young age has incited a fear in parents that the children playing the games would have an immunity to violence in the future, which is a result of the popularity of violence-inclusive games in the more recent trends across the planet, and is a worrying thought for parents around the world.

Video game addiction, particularly when the individuals are introduced at a young age, has caused dips in the social aptitude and comfort in social situations of the subjects. The prefrontal lobe of the brain, which controls creativity and emotion, also controls social skills, meaning that children with a gaming addiction may not become accustomed to social situations as quickly as those with more experience. This gradually becomes more of an issue as the children age.

== See also ==
- Video game controversy
