= Nishi-Tetsu bus hijacking =

2000 bus hijacking in southwestern Japan

Coordinates: 33.5312°N 130.4973°E

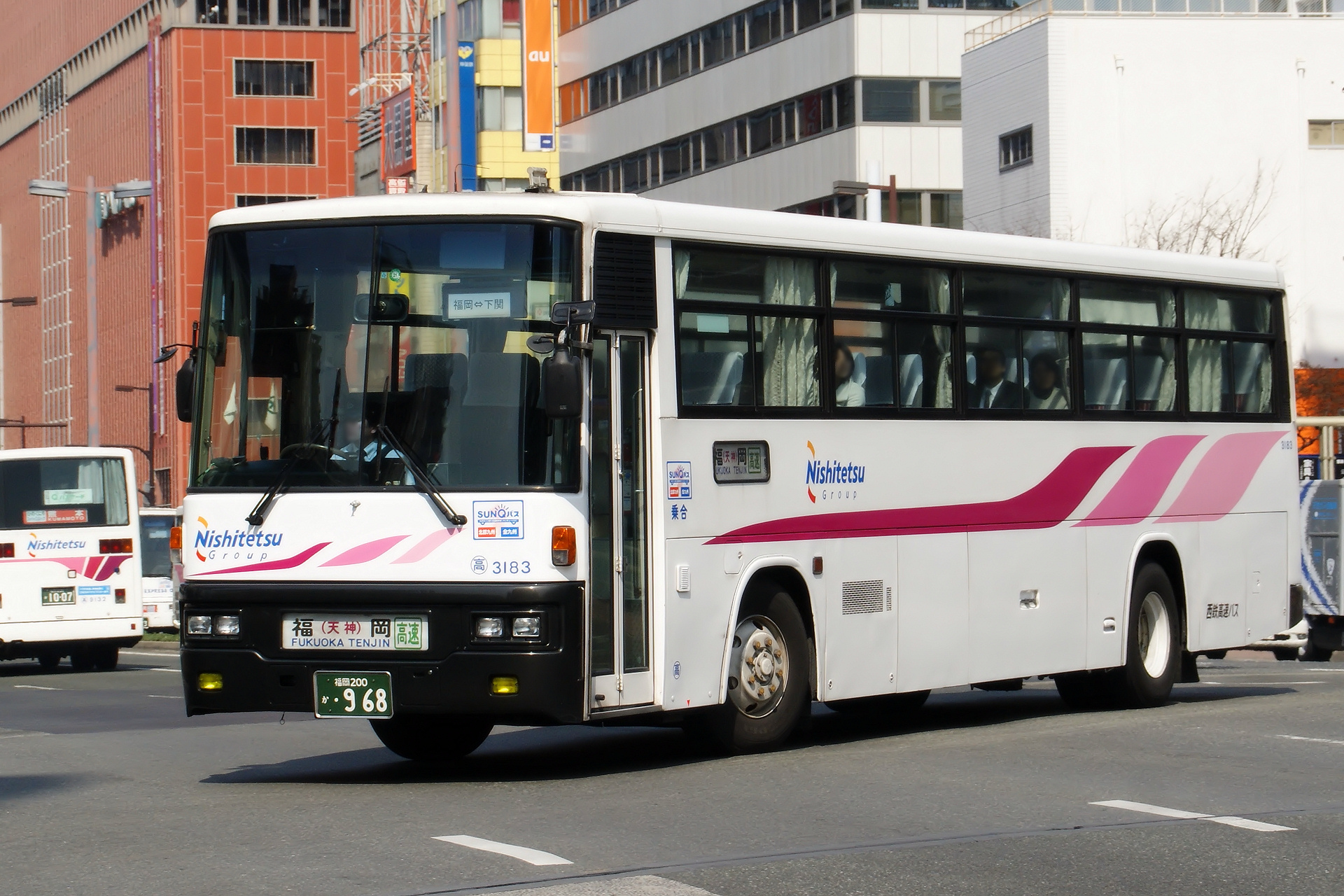
- A Nishi-Tetsu bus, similar to the one hijacked.
- Location: Fukuoka, Yamaguchi, and Hiroshima Prefecture, Japan
- Date: 3–4 May 2000 c. 13:35 – 5:03 (UTC+9)
- Weapon: Chef's knife
- Deaths: 1
- Injuries: 6 (3 by stabbing, 2 by falling, 1 by broken glass)
- Perpetrators: 17-year-old male
- Charges: Violation of the Firearm and Sword Possession Control Law and Law for the Punishment of Extortion Involving Hostage-Taking

On 3 May 2000, a bus hijacking occurred in Fukuoka Prefecture, Japan. The 17-year-old perpetrator held 21 people hostage with a knife and forced the bus to drive 300 kilometres through northern Kyushu and southern Honshu. Inside the bus, the hijacker stabbed three women, one of whom later died at a hospital, with two more people injured when they jumped from the moving vehicle. After five hours, the bus was stopped near Hiroshima and following an eleven-hour stand-off, the perpetrator was arrested when police stormed the bus. The perpetrator was not criminally charged and spent six years at a juvenile reform facility.

== Names ==
A common name for the hijacking is Nishi-Tetsu busjacking incident (西鉄バスジャック事件, Nishi-Tetsu basujakku jiken). Less frequently used names include Saga bus hijacking incident (佐賀バスジャック事件, Saga basujakku jiken) and Neomugicha incident (ネオむぎ茶事件, Neomugicha jiken), after the perpetrator's username on 2channel, where he had hinted at the commission of the crime.

== Incident ==
At around midday on 3 May 2000, the perpetrator (who was unnamed in reports due to his age), posted a cryptic threat in a 2channel thread under the name "Neomugicha" (ネオむぎ茶; lit. 'Neo-Barley Tea') from his home in Saga. He then boarded a short-distance travel bus managed by Nishi-Nippon Railroad, which departed at 12:56. Besides the perpetrator and the driver, the 40-seat bus contained 20 passengers and was en route to Fukuoka city, around two hours away.

At 13:35, the perpetrator hijacked the bus while at the interchange of Dazaifu on the Kyushu Expressway. After threatening the bus driver and putting a chef's knife to the man's throat, the perpetrator turned to the passengers and reportedly exclaimed "You are not going to Tenjin. You are going to hell." He ordered the curtains to be drawn and passengers to sit in the back. The hijacking was not reported until 2:47 p.m., when a 40-year-old woman, who was released to use the restroom in Moji-ku, used a highway phone to call Japan Highway Public Corporation.

Police engaged in a vehicle pursuit with the bus. A news helicopter provided a live broadcast of the chase on the San'yō Expressway. At 15:35, 29-year-old Mikiko Matsuno jumped out of the bus when it passed Ogōri. According to her, the perpetrator had stabbed at least two women shortly before. The hijacker called police using a mobile phone at 16:09, telling them about the female hostages. At 16:20, after passing into Chūgoku region, 52-year-old Masayuki Kishikawa, jumped off in Yamaguchi Prefecture. Both escaped hostages sustained light injuries from the fall.

At 17:50, the perpetrator forced the bus to stop outside of a police-blocked tunnel near Higashihiroshima, releasing four male passengers, leaving only the female passengers aboard. Police vehicles took 40 minutes to force the bus to drive further to the Okuya parking lot and once stopped there, a 34-year-old passenger escaped the bus through a window. An hour later, the perpetrator released two women with heavy stab wounds to the neck. One of them, 68-year-old Tatsuko Tsukamoto (塚本達子; born 21 September 1931), later died of her injuries.

After two hours of negotiations, police agreed to let the bus drive to Tokyo per the hijacker's demands, with a police car guiding at the front. At 22:02, the bus stopped at a service station in Higashihiroshima, where food and drink were provided. At 22:34, a 72-year-old hostage, also with neck injuries, was released. Just after midnight of 4 May, Saga City Police confirm the identity of the perpetrator, calling his parents to participate in negotiations. With the release of a 52-year-old woman the following hour, nine more passengers and the bus driver were still with the hijacker.

At 5:03, Special Assault Team's (Note: In foreign news, the SAT was credited as anti-riot officers.) Osaka and Fukuoka teams stormed the hijacked bus and captured the teenager alive. Smoke bombs were deployed, with one officer injured by broken glass. Due to the self-defense requirements as stipulated in the Law Concerning Execution of Duties of Police Officials, it took more than 15 hours for the hostage crisis to end.

== Aftermath ==
The teenager was arrested under the Firearm and Sword Control Law and the Law for the Punishment of Extortion Involving Hostage-Taking. He refused to give a motive for the hijacking, although it was noted that he had previously spent time at a psychiatric institution, where doctors attested only to "character problems" and no mental illness. He was nevertheless involuntarily committed after making death threats and purchasing a knife online. He had been out of the hospital on temporary release due to the Golden Week holidays. During the trial, the perpetrator claimed "his other self" had told him to kill the other passengers. It was also found that he had developed an interest in the 1997 Kobe child murders and used the nickname "cat killer" as a reference to the murders. Amidst other high-profile crimes perpetrated by adolescents, a revision of juvenile law was enacted on 28 November 2000, lowering the age for criminal punishment from 16 to 14, becoming effective on 1 April 2001.

In 2006, the suspect was officially released from a medical reformatory facility. This action led to calls to reform the Juvenile Act, which had been law since 1948.

The Hiroshima Prefectural Police established the Hostage Rescue Team in the Hiroshima Prefectural Police's Criminal Investigation Department as part of lessons learned from the incident.

One of the injured victims, Yumiko Yamaguchi (山口由美子), spent over a month in hospital care, retaining a scar across the left cheek to the corner of her mouth. She was a friend to the sole fatality, who was the elementary school teacher of her three children. Because she heard that the perpetrator had skipped school in the past, she founded a child's welfare organisation in Saga, specialising in truants. In 2005, Yamaguchi visited perpetrator while he was still in detention, voicing sympathy for the "pain he must have been in" but also telling him he was not forgiven. He subsequently bowed and wrote a letter to Yamaguchi that he cried following their encounter. Following the introduction of harsher criminal laws for juveniles, Yamaguchi also became an advocate of rehabilitative justice. In 2024, she published a book "Rebirth" ("再生"), which dealt with the recovery of the injured following the hijacking.

=== Copycat crimes ===
A poster named "Neoūroncha" (ネオ烏龍茶; lit. 'Neo-Oolong Tea') attempted to imitate "Neomugicha" by plotting to blow up the Odakyu Electric Railway in Japan and posting warnings about it on 2channel. Soon after the incident, however, the Japanese police were keeping a close eye on 2channel, so he was identified and arrested before his plan could be carried out. A poster called "Neobīru" (ネオビール; lit. 'Neo-Beer') also attempted to imitate the incident, planning a terrorist attack on a railway company, but he was also arrested.

== In popular culture ==
The incident was referenced within the 2015 anime series Punch Line. The hijacking of a civilian bus, which is being streamed to the internet, is considered to be "the Neomugicha incident all over again" by people within the show.

== Bibliography ==
- Itō, Kōichi (2004). The truth of the Metropolitan Police Special unit (in Japanese). Dainihon-kaiga. ISBN 978-4499228657.
- Kikuchi, Masayuki; Arimura, Takuma (2021). SAT special force (in Japanese). Ikaros Publishing. ISBN 978-4802209564.
