= Brain Exercise with Dr. Kawashima =

2009 video game

- Developer: Namco Bandai Games
- Publisher: Namco Bandai Games
- Platforms: iOS, Windows, mobile
- Release: June 8, 2009
- Genres: Puzzle, edutainment
- Modes: Single-player, multiplayer

Brain Exercise with Dr. Kawashima (川島教授の全脳トレ, "Kawashima Kyoju no Zen Noh Tore"; "Professor Kawashima's Full Brain Training") is a brain training game developed by Namco Bandai and tested by Dr. Kawashima, known for his Nintendo DS games Brain Age: Train Your Brain in Minutes a Day! and Brain Age 2: More Training in Minutes a Day!.

== Gameplay ==
The game is structured around a set of 15 minigames which are used in the different game modes.

After selecting a profile (there are three slots for different users) a cel-shaded 3D Dr. Kawashima will accompany the player when browsing the menus and will explain the minigames. After playing each minigame in any of the game modes, the player's performance is rated via a ranking of items found in nature, which includes creatures such as plankton, a whale, or a giraffe.

All the statistics for each player are kept in the player's profile; the game offers the possibility of uploading this data so it is available both on both the official website and Facebook.

== Game modes ==
Brain Training
Presents the player with three minigames. Only available once a day. The outcome is logged, allowing players to track their progress.
Brain Age
Presents the player with one minigame, after which, depending on the player's performance, the calculated Brain Age of the player will be shown. Just a limited number of minigames are suited for this mode and again it's only possible to play it once a day.
Quick Play
Allows playing any of the unlocked games as many times as wished.
Sudoku
A classic Sudoku game adapted to touch screen play; it is locked until the player achieves a ranking of Earth on any of the minigames.
Challenge
Up to four players can select a minigame and compete in hotseat multiplayer.

Testing the game at Dr. Kawashima's lab

== Development ==
The game was originally developed in Japan for i-mode devices, with the name 川島教授の全脳トレ (Kawashima Kyoju no Zen Noh Tore, Professor Kawashima's Full Brain Training). Today there are already 11 games available for i-mode phones in Japan, plus an arcade machine with printable cards and online high scores.

In 2007, the European branch of the Namco Bandai mobile division released the Java ME version, Brain Coach with Dr. Kawashima, with a selection of 10 minigames from the Japanese games and localized names per country. In 2008, the sequel More Brain Exercise with Dr. Kawashima was released, with 15 new minigames, high-score upload to Facebook, and Sudoku.

An abridged version of the game is also available for purchase by Verizon Wireless cellphone subscribers.

In May 2009, a PC version was also released with the name Brain Exercise with Dr. Kawashima.

Namco has announced a Windows Phone 7 version of the game.

The minigames are designed, tested, and implemented by the Namco Bandai team in Japan. After selecting the most interesting ones, some components of the development team will go to Dr. Kawashima's Lab at Tohoku University, where every game will be played while monitoring its effects on the brain of the player.
