= Kobe child murders =

1997 Japanese double-murder case

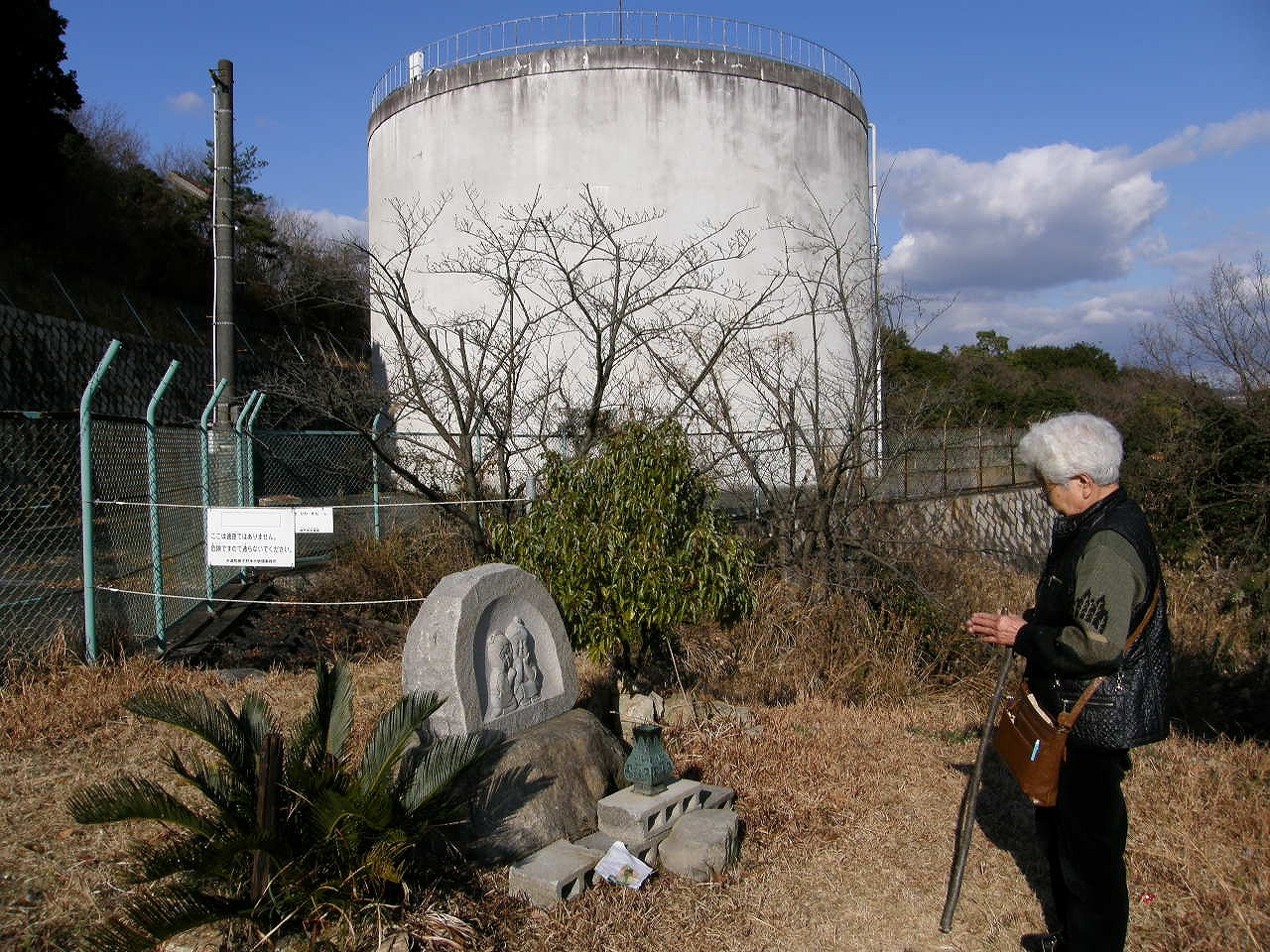
- Tank Mountain, where victim Jun Hase was murdered
- Location: Suma, Kobe, Japan
- Date: 16 March 1997 (murder of Yamashita); 24 May 1997 (murder of Hase)
- Attack type: Child-on-child murder, double-murder, attempted murders, beheading, bludgeoning, strangling, stabbing
- Weapons: Hammers, dagger, shoelaces
- Deaths: 2
- Injuries: 3
- Victims: Ayaka Yamashita, aged 10; Jun Hase, aged 11
- Perpetrator: Shinichiro Azuma (a.k.a. "Boy A" or Seito Sakakibara)
- Motive: Thrill, sexual sadism
- Convictions: Murder (2 counts)
- Sentence: 6 2/3 years in juvenile detention

The Kobe child murders (Japanese: 神戸連続児童殺傷事件, Hepburn: Kōbe renzoku jidō sasshō jiken) occurred in Suma, Kobe, Japan, on 16 March and 24 May 1997, when two children, ten-year-old Ayaka Yamashita (山下 彩花, Yamashita Ayaka) and eleven-year-old Jun Hase (土師 淳, Hase Jun) were murdered. Yamashita was fatally injured in a series of assaults on elementary school girls between February and March 1997 while Hase was abducted, strangled and mutilated before his severed head was left in front of a school.

The perpetrator, fourteen-year-old Shinichiro Azuma (東 真一郎, Azuma Shin'ichirō) used the alias Seito Sakakibara (酒鬼薔薇 聖斗, Sakakibara Seito) to write two messages to the public following the discovery of Hase's remains in May 1997, taunting police and threatening to commit more murders. Azuma was arrested in June 1997 and confessed to the murder of Hase. He also admitted to killing Yamashita and three additional attacks on schoolgirls.

As a juvenile offender, Azuma was prosecuted and convicted as "Boy A." His real name has not been officially released to the press because Japanese law prohibits publishing the identification, but his real name has been reported in some weekly magazines. Beginning in 2004, Azuma was released on provisional basis, with full release announced to follow on 1 January 2005. The murders and subsequent release of Azuma gained widespread attention from Japanese media and politicians.

== Attacks ==
1 First assaults
2 Site of Ayaka Yamashita's murder
3 Second assault
4 Site of Jun Hase's murder and dump site of Hase's body
5 Dump site of Jun Hase's head

On 10 February 1997, Shinichiro Azuma attacked two twelve-year-old sixth-grade students of Minami-Ochiai Elementary School, at around 16:35 near an apartment complex in Nakaochiai district. The two girls were returning home when Azuma struck them in the back of the head. One of the injured girls required a week of treatment for her injuries.

=== Ayaka Yamashita ===
On 16 March 1997, at around 12:25, Azuma bludgeoned ten-year-old Ayaka Yamashita, a fourth-grade student of Ryugadai Elementary School, near a residential building in Ryugadai, causing her death the following week. Ten minutes after the attack, Azuma stabbed and injured a nine-year-old girl with a 13-cm dagger outside of Tatsugaoka Park. The same day, Azuma wrote in his diary: "I carried out sacred experiments today to confirm how fragile human beings are... I brought the hammer down, when the girl turned to face me. I think I hit her a few times but I was too excited to remember."

The following week, when Yamashita was declared brain dead, Azuma added on 23 March: "This morning my mom told me, 'Poor girl. The girl attacked seems to have died.' There is no sign of me being caught... I thank you, "Bamoidōkishin", for this... Please continue to protect me." As revealed in Azuma's manuscript, "13 Years Imprisonment" ("懲役十三年"), "Bamoidōkishin" refers to an apparent deity, evidenced by the character 神 for "kami," whom he claimed to have "created from hatred" in his childhood. The manuscript details a contract which would end with Azuma serving thirteen years in prison for committing murders as part of a "crime pact" to pledge allegiance with "Bamoidōkishin" in exchange for forgiveness of the same crimes.

On 15 May, Azuma stopped attending his third-year class at Tomogaoka Junior High School after an incident two days earlier in which he had phoned a classmate for a meeting in the park and then punched him in the mouth, chipping some of the classmate's teeth by wrapping his watch around the fist. Azuma's parents regularly took him to a child psychiatrist during this time. The assault was considered the high point in a number of other "eccentric delinquent acts" at Azuma's school, including stealing and burning other students' shoes, hitting people with a table tennis racket and slashing bicycle tires with a box cutter.

=== Jun Hase ===
Murder victim Jun Hase

Just before 14:00 on 24 May 1997, while walking a street of Tomogaoka, Azuma encountered eleven-year-old Jun Hase, a special education pupil at Tainohata Elementary School, where Azuma had attended primary education. Hase was lured to Tank Mountain in Taihata, where Azuma claimed that he would show Hase a turtle. There, Azuma overpowered Hase and fatally strangled him with the boy's own shoelaces. He stole a hacksaw and padlock from a nearby co-op supermarket, then broke into an empty television relay station on the mountain in which he hid Hase's body. Hase was reported missing by his family the same evening.

On 25 May, Azuma returned to the station, where he beheaded Hase's body between 13:00 and 15:00. He further mutilated Hase's head by stabbing out both eyes, cutting into both cheeks and unsuccessfully attempting to cut out the tongue. Azuma took the head and left Hase's body inside the station. He first hid the head in a hole near Irikakunoike pond, then brought the head to his home on 26 May. There was a widespread search for Hase by this point through Hyōgo Prefectural Police, the Kobe Fire Department and Tainohata Elementary School's PTA, due to which Azuma assumed that he would soon be caught and believed that leaving the head in a public place would draw attention away from him. He chose his junior high school for the location, since he thought it would implicate school staff in the killing.

In the morning of 27 May, at around 2:00, Azuma snuck out of his room through a window and drove to Tomogaoka Junior High School with his bicycle, carrying Hase's head in a plastic bag inside the bike's satchel. He tried to place the head on the outer wall, but it fell down, after which Azuma left the head in front of the main gate. Before leaving, Azuma stuffed a handwritten note into Hase's mouth, taking care to have the signature of the letter visible. He returned home after watching the head for six to seven minutes.

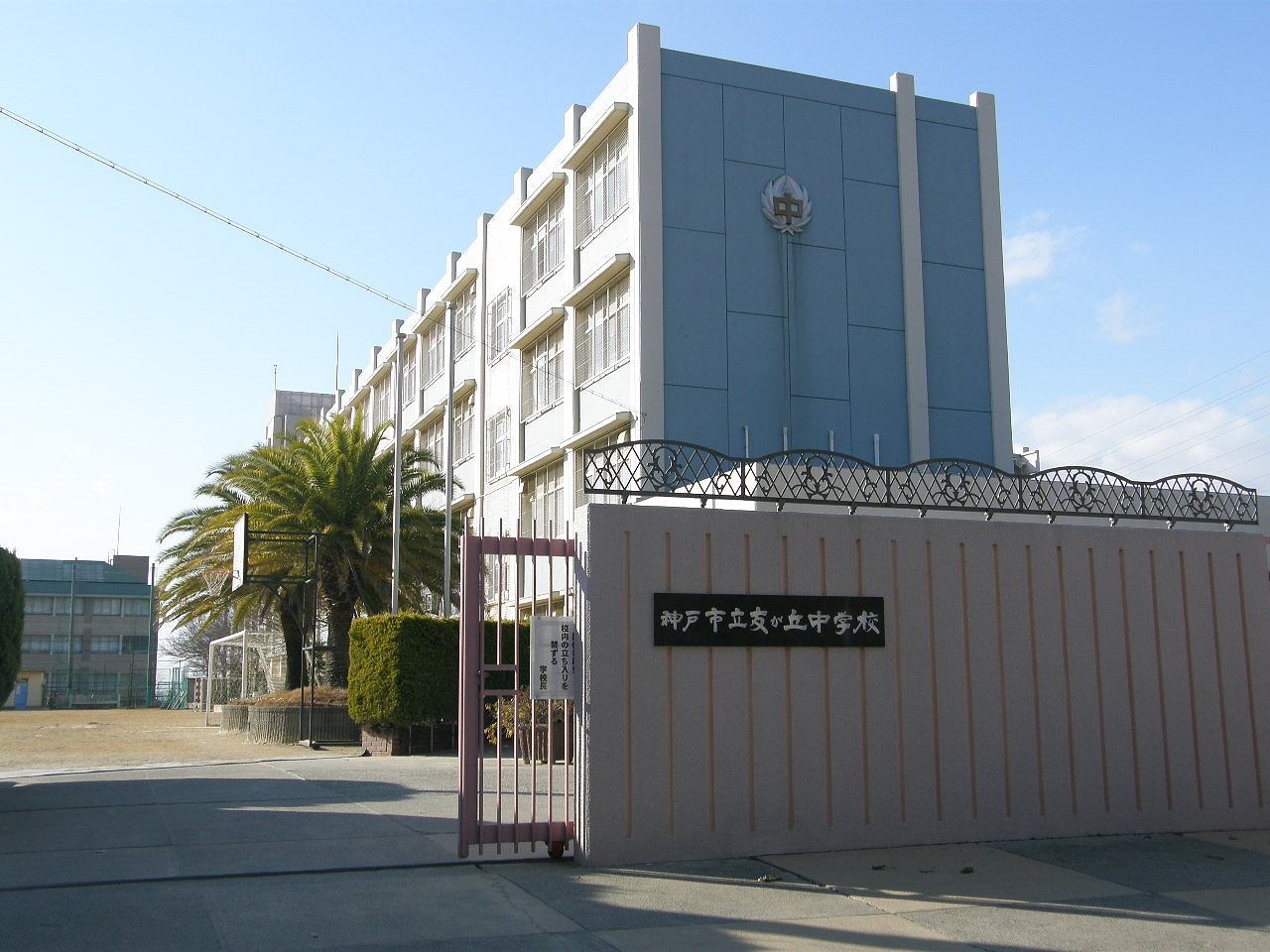
Front gate of Tomogaoka Junior High School, where Jun Hase's head was recovered

Hase's head was discovered a few hours later. While Azuma had planned for Hase to be seen by his fellow pupils when they arrived for school, a passerby instead found the head before opening hours. The note, which was written with each sentence in a vertical listing, was published in newspapers the same day and read:

Now, the game begins.

Stupid police officers. Try to stop me. I find killing extremely enjoyable. I can't help but want to see people die. Death is the punishment for those filthy vegetables. Bloodshed justice for a long-standing grudge.

SHOOLL KILL

— Sakakibara, the School Murderer (Note: さあゲームの始まりです 愚鈍な警察諸君 ボクを止めてみたまえ ボクは殺しが愉快でたまらない 人の死が見たくて見たくてしょうがない 汚い野菜共には死の制裁を 積年の大怨に流血の裁きを SHOOLL KILL 学校殺死の酒鬼薔薇)

Azuma used the term "vegetables" to refer to people around him; he had learned this term from his parents, who had once told him, "If you are nervous at your sports day, picture the people around you as vegetables." According to Azuma, he wrote the word "SHOOLL KILL" because he believed it to be English for "school killer." The note also included a symbol which Azuma later described as "inspired by the inverted swastika of Nazi Germany", after reading Mein Kampf while in elementary school.

== Investigation ==
Hase's decapitated body was found at the relay station a few hours after the discovery of his head. Newspapers connected the killing of Hase to the schoolgirl attacks in February and March.

Police commented that the style of Hase's killing and the note was reminiscent of that of the Zodiac murders in the United States during the late 1960s. According to friends of Azuma, he had developed a fascination with the case through the 1986 true crime book Zodiac by Robert Graysmith when its Japanese translation was published.

Having heard of the discovery of Hase's remains, Azuma was surprised that his murder site was found in addition to the head. Journalists initially thought that "Sakakibara" was a "highly-educated" adult man in his thirties due to the formal kanji used in the letters. However, linguists noted that these expressions were common in popular manga and it was suggested that the perpetrator was not a social person since the texts weren't very colloquial, to the point where it was considered that the writer was a Chinese speaker. There were two prevailing descriptions of middle-aged men in menial workwear reported around Tank Mountain at the time of Hase's murder. There was the "Padlock Man," who was seen at the same supermarket where Azuma had stolen tools. Another was the "Scooter Man," who was seen driving a scooter near the mountain. Both men were identified in mid-June and quickly dismissed as suspects. Other reports focused on suspicious vehicles seen during the previous attacks, either a black Nissan Bluebird sedan or white van, with varying descriptions of their drivers. Rumours persisted until Azuma's arrest.

The newspaper Sankei Shimbun speculated that the perpetrator was left-handed due to the angle of wounds inflicted on the injured girl on 16 March. According to police reports, however, the investigation believed that the perpetrator was right-handed due to noticeable pressure marks found on the base of Hase's head.

Based on press coverage, Azuma assumed that he was unlikely to be caught since police were looking for an adult. He decided to write a manifesto to the press, worried that the note left with Hase's head didn't express his worldview clearly enough. Azuma wrote the messages in what he thought was the style of a man in his thirties from an unstable homelife who resented the school system for bullying. He made several drafts in his school notebook, incorporating some phrases and kanji characters from the previous note, before copying the writing onto a separate sheet. The letter was postmarked on 3 June with no address or name. Afterwards, Azuma burned the pages containing the original drafts.

=== Letter ===
On 6 June, the letter was sent to the newspaper Kobe Shinbun. Enclosed was a three-page, 1400-character letter, also written in red ink, which included a six-character name that can be pronounced as "Sakakibara Seito." The same characters, which mean "alcohol," "devil," "rose," "saint" and "fight", were used in the first message that was left inside Hase's mouth. In the letter, "Sakakibara" claimed responsibility for the killing and mutilation of Jun Hase, threatening that more killings would follow. He included the slightly revised signature "SHOOLL KILLER."

Azuma had begun the letter by addressing a mistake made by a local TV broadcaster, which mispronounced the "Sakakibara" name as "Onibara" – "Demon Rose," which he disliked, writing that he wanted to be called by his "real name." The letter largely blamed the Japanese educational system for his actions, claiming "compulsory education formed me, an invisible person." Azuma also accused police of putting no effort into the investigation to "cover up [his] existence," which was supposedly a recurring event in his life. He claimed that his crimes differed from "pathetic revenge" in that he stylised the murders as a game which created for him "a new world all your own," further writing, "I am putting my life at stake for the sake of this game... If I'm caught, I'll probably be hanged... police should be angrier and more tenacious in pursuing me." Azuma stated that he was driven by a natural urge to kill, writing, "It's only when I kill that I am liberated from the constant hatred that I suffer and that I am able to attain peace. It is only when I give pain to people that I can ease my own pain." At the end of the letter, he wrote, "From now on, if you misread my name or spoil my mood I will kill three vegetables a week. If you think I can only kill children you are greatly mistaken. I have the ability to kill the same person twice."

Kobe Shinbun assumed that the letter was authentic and similar in nature to those by serial killer Tsutomu Miyazaki, who also wrote taunting letters to authorities with the purpose of confusing police.

=== Custody and confession ===
Azuma was given a voluntary order to be questioned by police in Hase's murder on 28 June. He first denied involvement, but after police claimed to have matched his handwriting, Azuma started crying and confessed to killing Hase, as well as Yamashita. He also admitted to attacking three other girls. Azuma was then officially arrested for murder and abandonment of a corpse. According to Azuma, "Seito Sakakibara" was the name he gave his "bad side" when he was in elementary school, also claiming that Hase's beheading was part of a ritual. While his identity remained hidden, a photo of Azuma was published on 2 July by the photo magazine FOCUS. By the time a recall was ordered by various newspaper publishers, most issues had already sold out, with the magazine Shukan Shincho continuing the sale, editing a censor bar over Azuma's eyes. FOCUS and Shukan Shincho refused to comply with a continued order by the Ministry of Justice.

On 13 July, police were provided a complete confession by Azuma about the course of events leading to the murders, as well as the explanations for some details in his letters. The weapons used in the murders and assaults, three hammers and a dagger, were found in Mukaihata pond on 7 July. Azuma was officially indicted for the assaults on 16 July and placed in a juvenile holding facility on 25 July.

== Treatment ==
Azuma was tried at Kobe Family Court beginning 4 August 1997. EEG, CT and MRI scans as well as chromosome and hormone testing were performed after he claimed to experience auditory hallucinations, which found no abnormalities.

A psychological examination determined that Azuma had conduct disorder and some symptoms of depersonalisation and dissociation, although these were not significant enough to result in diminished responsibility as he was otherwise aware of his actions. Azuma had been receiving psychiatric treatment since 1995 and was previously diagnosed with ADHD. It was noted that he had a history of torturing and killing animals, starting with insects and frogs in fifth grade; he later admitted to killing at least twenty cats by his mid-teens. In elementary school, he also had a habit of making dirt sculptures with sharp blades hidden inside.

Through his statements, it was determined that Azuma had acted out of sexual sadism, as he told psychiatrists that he could only attain arousal through acts of violence, through which he achieved spontaneous ejaculation. Furthermore, he stated that he was not attracted to either girls his age or women in general. Azuma had hoped that killing a human would give him even greater pleasure than killing animals and that he considered everyone but himself a "vegetable." He was described as holding nihilist beliefs and lacking both self-esteem and empathy. Azuma voiced no regret for the crimes, stating that it was Hase's own fault for agreeing to follow him to Tank Mountain.

On 13 October 1997, under the decision of Judge Igaki Yasuhiro, Azuma was set to be detained indefinitely at the Kanto Medical Juvenile Training School. During this time, there was an attempt to have two psychologists act as "pseudo-parents" to Azuma, which saw limited success. In 1998, Azuma attempted to stab another juvenile with a ball-point pen after the latter made a lewd comment about a female psychologist, whom Azuma had previously described as "the ideal mother." In 1999, an out-of-court settlement was reached following a lawsuit by Yamashita's family, who were set to receive 80,000,000 yen in compensation.

Azuma remained in juvenile custody after reaching age of majority with his eighteenth birthday. In November 2001 he was transferred to Tohoku Juvenile Training School due to a good assessment in rehabilitation by staff. Azuma was initially there under a false name, but he eventually revealed his identity as "Sakakibara" when asked by other students. He was repeatedly bullied for this, culminating in an incident during the summer of 2002 in which he stripped half-naked and threatened his peers with a ball-point pen. When the other boys were removed from the room by counsellors, Azuma stabbed himself in the genitals with a box cutter. This incident resulted in an extension to his detainment at the school until at least the end of 2004 by Kobe Family Court. In March 2003, however, the school successfully applied for Azuma's provisional release.

== Aftermath and controversy ==
After the murders, Representative Shizuka Kamei called for restricting objectionable content, blaming the murders on graphic movies and stating that "[the incident] gives adults the chance to rethink the policy of self-imposed restrictions on these films and whether they should allow them just because they are profitable."

Through 1997 and 1998, a faction of the Japan Revolutionary Communist League led a number of break-ins at facilities holding case files related to the murders, illegally distributing the information under the belief that "Boy A" was wrongfully accused as part of a government conspiracy, in what is known as the Kakumaru-ha incident related to the Kobe incident.

Azuma's parents divorced following his arrest. His father left Kobe and changed his name, publishing a book entitled "Boy A: Birthing this Child" (「少年A」この子を生んで……), with all proceeds going to Yamashita's family. Although Azuma's father was apologetic for his son's actions, he was criticised for not knowing the names of Azuma's victims in the non-fatal assaults. Azuma's mother visited him in juvenile detention in 2002 and asked him if he had really committed the murders, which he confirmed.

In 2000, Japan's bicameral legislature lowered the age for criminal responsibility from 16 to 14. However, in the wake of the murder of Satomi Mitarai in Sasebo in 2004, there has been some discussion for the need for further revision.

On 11 March 2004, in an unprecedented act, the Ministry of Justice announced that Azuma, then aged 21, was being released on a provisional basis, with a full release to follow on 1 January 2005. He was set to live by himself on the property of his probation officer in Saitama Prefecture. Critics charged that since the government had taken the unusual step of notifying the public, Azuma was likely not fit for release and should be transferred to prison. In the wake of the Sasebo incident three months later, this criticism was exacerbated.

Due to the seriousness of the murders and the fact that they had been committed by a minor, Azuma's name and new residence to this day remain a highly guarded secret, hence why he was typically referred to by the official alias "Boy A" or the self-given moniker "Seito Sakakibara." Nonetheless, Azuma's real name has been circulated on the internet since 29 June 1997, according to journalist Fumihiko Takayama.

In June 2015, Azuma, then aged 32, released an autobiography through Ohta Publishing titled Zekka (絶歌), in which he claimed to express regret for his crimes and recounted the murders in graphic detail. Despite attempts by Hase's family to block its release, and despite one bookstore chain refusing to stock it, the book quickly reached the top of Japanese bestseller lists. Azuma earned an estimated 10,000,000 yen through the sales. A few months later, Azuma set up a website in which he posted bizarre photoshopped images of a nude male, suggested to be himself. In response to these controversies, the tabloid Shūkan Post publicized Azuma's real name, as well as his location and occupation at the time.

== See also ==
- List of major crimes in Japan
- Nishi-Tetsu bus hijacking
- Real World, a novel by Natsuo Kirino based on the Kobe child murders
- Sasebo slashing
- Son of Sam law
- Zodiac Killer
