= Swallows (novel) =

2022 novel by Natsuo Kirino

燕は戻ってこない (Tsubame wa Modottekonai)
- Novel
- Written by: Natsuo Kirino
- Illustrated by: Eiko Sasaki
- Published by: Shueisha
- English publisher: Penguin Random House
- Published: March 4, 2022
- Manga
- Written by: Natsuo Kirino
- Illustrated by: Eri Sakai
- Published by: Shueisha
- Imprint: Margaret Comics
- Magazine: Cocohana
- Original run: February 28, 2024 – January 28, 2026
- Volumes: 2
- Television drama
- Directed by: Kenji Tanaka; Yūki Yamato; Takashi Kitano
- Produced by: Maiko Itagaki; Daishi Okoshi
- Written by: Ikue Nagata
- Music by: Evan Call
- Original network: NHK General TV
- Original run: April 30, 2024 – July 2, 2024
- Episodes: 10

Swallows (Japanese: 燕は戻ってこない, Hepburn: Tsubame wa Modottekonai) is Japanese novel written by Natsuo Kirino. The novel was serialized from 2019 to 2021 and published in print in March 2022. It was also adapted into a manga series and live-action television drama series.

== Plot ==
Riki, a 29-year-old woman originally from Hokkaido, works as a temporary worker in Tokyo hospital. Having financial troubles, she learns about surrogacy and offers to become the surrogate mother of another couple, which are Kusaoke Motoi, a former ballet dancer, and his wife Yuko.

== Media ==
=== Novel ===
Swallows was published as a serialized novel from 2019 to 2021, and later as a full novel on March 4, 2022. It was released in English by Penguin Random House on September 9. 2025.

=== Drama ===
A live-action television drama adaptation aired on NHK General TV from April 30 to July 2, 2024.

=== Manga ===
A manga adaptation illustrated by Eri Sakai was serialized in Shueisha's Cocohana magazine on February 28, 2024, to January 26, 2026.

== Reception ==
Swallows won two awards, the Mainichi Art Award in 2022 and the Yoshikawa Eiji Literary Award in 2023.

Financial Times' Catherine Taylor gave it a positive review, calling it a "A witty portrayal of surrogacy that confronts the injustices of class and gender imbalances in Japanese society"
