= Dr Kawashima's Brain Training for Nintendo Switch =

2020 video game

- Home menu icon
- Developers: Nintendo EPD indieszero
- Publisher: Nintendo
- Director: Kenta Kubo
- Producers: Kouichi Kawamoto; Takayuki Shimamura
- Artists: Kunihiro Hasuoka; Yosuke Fujino
- Composers: Minako Hamano; Akito Nakatsuka; Soshi Abe
- Series: Brain Age
- Platform: Nintendo Switch
- Release: JP: December 27, 2019; EU/AU: January 3, 2020; KOR: July 1, 2020; CHN: April 18, 2024
- Genres: Edutainment, Puzzle
- Modes: Single-player, multiplayer

Dr Kawashima's Brain Training for Nintendo Switch (Note: In Japanese, the game is known as Supervised by Professor Ryuta Kawashima, Institute of Aging Medicine, Tohoku University Nintendo Switch training for adults to train their brain (東北大学加齢医学研究所 川島隆太教授監修脳を鍛える大人の Nintendo Switchトレーニング, Tōhokudaigaku kareiigakukenkyūjo kawashima ryūta kyōju kanshū nō o kitaeru otona no Nintendo Switch torēningu).) is a 2019 edutainment puzzle video game developed by Nintendo and indieszero and published by Nintendo for the Nintendo Switch. It is the fifth entry in the Brain Age puzzle video game series, based on the research of neuroscientist Ryuta Kawashima, whose avatar guides the player through the game. It was released on December 27, 2019 in Japan, January 3, 2020 in Europe and Australia, and July 1, 2020 in South Korea.

Dr Kawashima's Brain Training for Nintendo Switch builds upon the previous installments by adding puzzles and mini-games to strengthen the player's memory and concentration skills. The game contains previous puzzles in the series, all of which are taught by Dr. Kawashima. Puzzles in the game take advantage of some of the Nintendo Switch's functionalities such as the gyroscope and IR sensors. Physical editions of the game include a stylus to aid its touchscreen puzzles as an alternative to using the fingers.

The game received generally mixed reviews from critics with praise for the use of the Switch's technology, puzzles, and replay value, though many felt the game lacked innovation and variety. The game has sold 1.20 million copies as of December 2021.

== Gameplay ==
This displays the player's hand is detected by the right Joy-Con's IR sensor to make a specific shape for Roshambo.

The player is presented with two modes: Quick Play and Daily Training. This game is played mostly in handheld mode with barely any usage of the TV mode. The Nintendo Switch console is mostly held vertically during play for easier drawing and tapping on the touchscreen. In total, the game contains 24 unique puzzles, all of which utilize the console's technology such as the IR sensor in the right Joy-Con, the Joy-Con shoulder buttons, and the touchscreen.

In Quick Play, mini-games can be played at the player's own pace, with each mini-game being unlocked daily. This mode allows for multiplayer, a new feature to the series. In Daily Training, the player has full access to a selection of puzzles, unlocking more puzzles the more days they play. The player can perform a "Brain Age Check", where the player performs three standard puzzles and their performance determines the "age" of the brain. Solving the puzzles speedily will result in a younger Brain Age. Once a day the player receives a stamp which allows playing more mini-games.

This game features a championship mode, where players connect online to compete with players worldwide. This feature uses Nintendo Switch Online. The championship mode takes place every Saturday, where players have up to two attempts per Daily Training puzzle to solve as fast as they can. The fastest attempt is submitted to the championship, where players are read their results instantly after finishing. Players receive access to online players' performances every Monday. The championship mode also allows the user to send messages to other players and compare their results once a day. In July 2020, the mode was used for an event where players can compete with Dr. Ryuta Kawashima.

== Development ==
The Nintendo Switch version was developed by most of the original developers of previous Brain Age games, led by producer Kouichi Kawamoto, who directed most of the series. Additional development was provided by indieszero.

The game was announced on the Nintendo Japan YouTube account on September 30, 2019. Two weeks later, it was announced that the game would come to Europe and Australia on January 3, 2020. On December 27, 2019, the game was released in Japan.

== Reception ==
Reception

Aggregate scores
| Aggregator | Score |
|---|---|
| Metacritic | 64/100 |
| OpenCritic | 26% recommend |

Review scores
| Publication | Score |
|---|---|
| 4Players | 64/100 |
| IGN | 7/10 |
| Jeuxvideo.com | 13/20 |
| Nintendo Life | 6/10 |

The game received mixed reviews. Many praised the puzzles' quality and repeatability as well as the game making good use of Nintendo Switch technology. However, the game was criticized for being too similar to previous installments and a lack of variety. Some noted that the game was not suitable for the recently released Nintendo Switch Lite since the system does not have detachable Joy-Con or IR sensors. The game had also performed to the same quality of other Nintendo games with awkward handwriting recognition and a limited amount of puzzles.

In the UK, sales charts showed that the game was number 14 in physical sales within its first week, the highest it has been in the series. As of February 2021, the game has sold over 367,198 copies in Japan according to Famitsu. As of December 2021, the game has sold 1.20 million copies.

=== Awards ===
| Award | Date of ceremony | Category | Result | Ref. |
|---|---|---|---|---|
| Golden Joystick 2020 | November 24, 2020 | Nintendo Game of the Year | Nominated | |

In November 2020, the game was nominated for Nintendo Game of the Year at the Golden Joystick Awards, however, it lost to Animal Crossing: New Horizons.
