= Out (2002 film) =

- Film poster
- Directed by: Hideyuki Hirayama
- Screenplay by: Wui-Sin Chong
- Based on: Out by Natsuo Kirino
- Produced by: Satoshi Fukushima
- Starring: Mieko Harada; Mitsuko Baisho; Shigeru Muroi; Naomi Nishida
- Cinematography: Kōzō Shibasaki
- Edited by: Akimasa Kawashima
- Music by: Goro Yasukawa
- Release date: October 19, 2002 (Japan)
- Running time: 119 minutes
- Country: Japan
- Language: Japanese

Out is a 2002 Japanese film directed by Hideyuki Hirayama based upon Natsuo Kirino's 1997 novel of the same name. It was Japan's official submission for Best Foreign Language Film at the 75th Academy Awards, but was not accepted as a nominee.

== Cast ==
- Mieko Harada as Masako Katori
- Mitsuko Baisho as Yoshie Azuma
- Shigeru Muroi as Kuniko Jonouchi
- Naomi Nishida as Yayoi Yamamoto
- Teruyuki Kagawa as Akira Jumonji
- Kanpei Hazama as Mitsuyoshi Satake

== See also ==
- Cinema of Japan
- List of submissions to the 75th Academy Awards for Best Foreign Language Film
- List of Japanese submissions for the Academy Award for Best Foreign Language Film
