= Out (novel) =

Novel by Natsuo Kirino

- First edition
- Author: Natsuo Kirino
- Translator: Stephen Snyder
- Language: Japanese
- Genre: Crime, Social mystery
- Publisher: Vintage Books
- Publication date: 1997 (Japanese edition); September 30, 2004 (English translation)
- Publication place: Japan
- Media type: Print (Paperback)
- Pages: 388 pp (paperback edition)
- ISBN: 0-09-947228-7
- OCLC: 56467355

Out (アウト) is a 1997 Japanese crime novel written by Japanese author Natsuo Kirino and published in English in 2004. The novel won the 51st Mystery Writers of Japan Award for Best Novel. It is Kirino's first novel to be published in the English language. This novel is currently published by Vintage, part of Random House, in Britain and has been translated into English by Stephen Snyder. The English translation was nominated for the 2004 Edgar Award for Best Novel.

The Japanese film adaptation of Out, directed by Hirayama Hideyuki, was released in 2002 to generally tepid reviews. According to Variety (on-line edition), New Line Cinema has purchased the rights for an American version, to be directed by Nakata Hideo (Ring, Ring 2).

== Plot summary ==
The novel tells the tales of four women, working the graveyard shift at a Japanese bento factory. All four women live hard lives. Masako, the leader of the four women, feels completely alienated from her estranged husband and teenage son. Kuniko, a plump and rather vain girl, has recently been ditched by her boyfriend after the couple were driven into debt, leaving Kuniko to fend off a loan shark. Yoshie is a single mother and reluctant caretaker of her mother-in-law, who was left partly paralyzed after a stroke. Yayoi is a thirty-four-year-old mother of two small boys whom she is forced to leave home alone, where they are abused by their drunken, gambling father, Kenji.

When Yayoi returns home one night, Kenji tells her that he has gambled all their savings away in a baccarat game. Yayoi becomes upset and questions Kenji about Anna, a hostess of the club where Kenji gambles, with whom she suspects he's having an affair. Earlier that night the club owner, Satake, ordered Kenji to stop stalking Anna. Kenji became belligerent and started assailing Satake, forcing him to kick Kenji down some stairs in the club. Nonetheless, Kenji, furious after Yayoi mentions Anna, begins hitting her. The following night, Yayoi snaps and strangles Kenji to death.

Yayoi desperately persuades Masako, with the eventual aid of Yoshie and Kuniko, to help her dispose of Kenji's body. The body is dismembered, secured in many black garbage bags, and hidden all over Tokyo. It isn't long before one carelessly hidden bag is discovered, and the police begin to ask questions. As if things weren't bad enough, the women begin to blackmail each other, the loan shark is requiring their services, and Satake, who has lost everything because of their antics, has begun to hunt the women down.

== See also ==
- Tozai Mystery Best 100 (The Top 100 Mystery Novels of the East and the West)
