= Killing of Satomi Mitarai =

2004 Japanese murder

Sasebo slashing
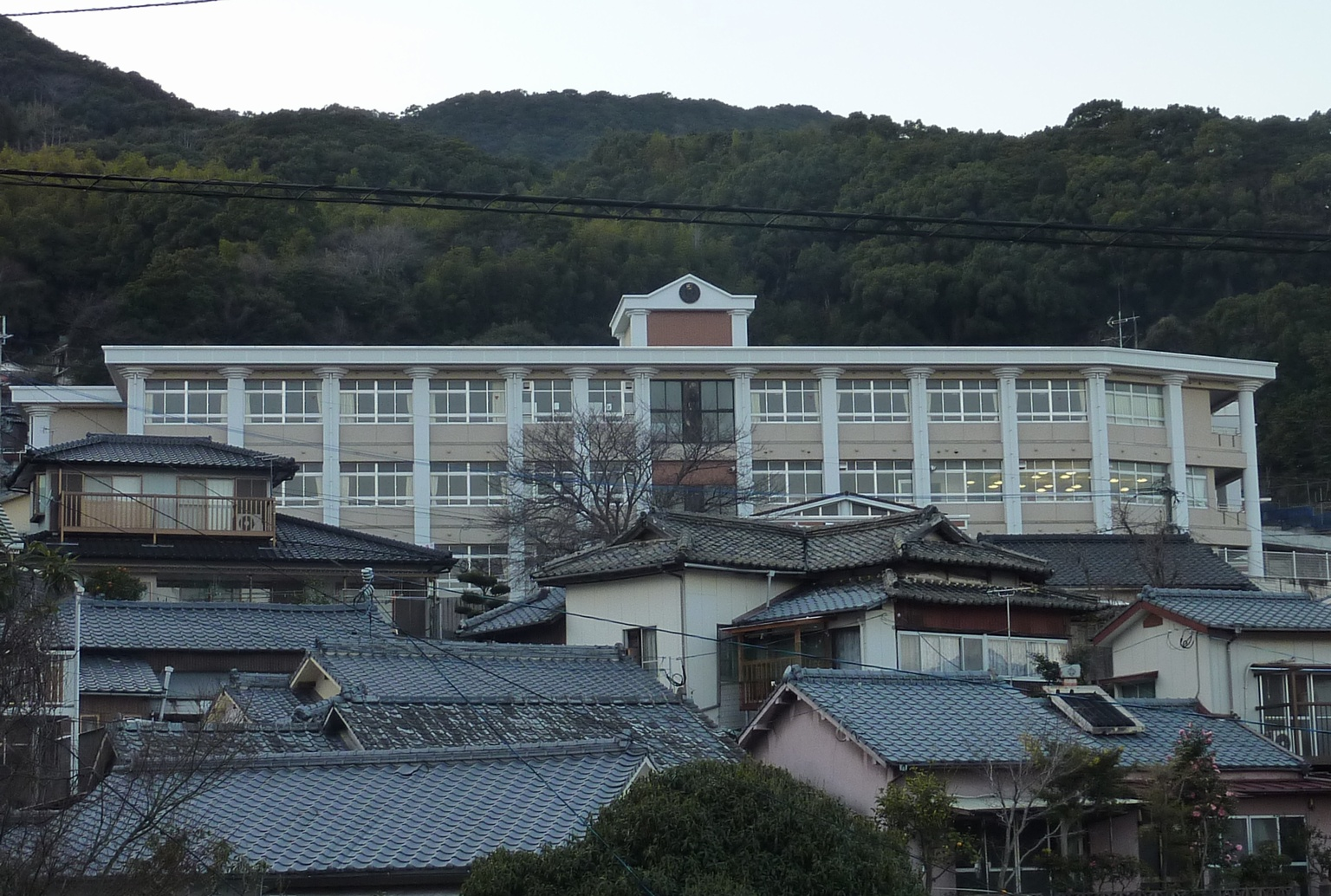
- Okubo Elementary School, the site of the murder (pictured on 2011)
- Location: Okubo Elementary School, Higashiokubocho, Sasebo, Nagasaki Prefecture, Japan
- Date: June 1, 2004
- Attack type: Murder
- Weapon: Utility knife
- Deaths: 1
- Victims: Satomi Mitarai, 12
- Perpetrators: Girl A, 11

The "Sasebo slashing" (Japanese: 佐世保小6女児同級生殺害事件, Hepburn: Sasebo shōroku joji dōkyūsei satsugai jiken), also known as the Nevada-tan murder, was the murder of a 12-year-old Japanese schoolgirl, Satomi Mitarai (御手洗 怜美, Mitarai Satomi), by an 11-year-old female classmate, "Girl A" (a common placeholder name for juvenile female criminals in Japan). The murder occurred on June 1, 2004, at an elementary school in Sasebo, Nagasaki Prefecture. The murderer slit Mitarai's throat and arms with a box cutter.

The killer's name was not released to the press, as per Japanese legal procedures prohibiting the identification of juvenile offenders; the Nagasaki District Legal Affairs Bureau cautioned Internet users against revealing her photos. Members of the Japanese Internet community 2channel read a name on a classroom drawing believed to be made by Girl A, and publicized the name on June 18, 2004.

The incident sparked discussions about lowering the age of criminal responsibility in Japan.

== Murder ==
On June 1, 2004, 12:15 PM, at Okubo Elementary School in Sasebo, Nagasaki Prefecture, as break time started, between 15 and 35 minutes past the hour, Girl A called a 12-year-old classmate, Satomi Mitarai, to an empty classroom approximately 50 meters north of the 6th-grade classroom, reportedly by saying "Your attitude is insolent" and "Come here for a moment". Girl A closed the curtains and had Mitarai sit on a chair while covering her eyes, Girl A slit Mitarai's throat and arms with a box cutter from behind, Mitarai attempted to stand up and wave her hands in an attempt to resist, but Girl A continued slashing her several times and reportedly watched her bleed to ensure her death. She returned to her classroom with her clothes covered in blood. Her teacher checked her arms and hands for wounds; she found none and demanded an answer. Girl A allegedly responded, "It's not my blood. It's not me." The teacher then discovered Mitarai's body.

After being taken into custody, Girl A reportedly confessed to the crime, saying, "I am sorry, I am sorry," to police officers. She spent the night at the police station, often crying, and refusing to eat or drink. Girl A confessed that she and Mitarai used to be close friends, but their relationship ended as a result of messages left on the (now deactivated) chatroom site Cafesta. Girl A claimed that Mitarai slandered her by commenting on her weight and calling her a "goody-goody".

On September 15, 2004, disregarding her young age, a Japanese Family Court ruled to institutionalize Girl A because of the severity of the crime. She was sent to a reformatory facility in Tochigi Prefecture. The Nagasaki family court originally sentenced Girl A to two years of involuntary commitment; the sentence was extended by two years in September 2006, following a psychological evaluation. On May 29, 2008, local authorities announced that they did not seek an additional sentence.

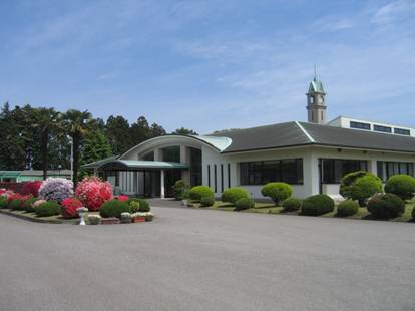
A reformatory in Tochigi Prefecture where "Girl A" was institutionalized

Because of her issues with communication and obsessive interests, Girl A was diagnosed after the murder with Asperger syndrome.

== Reaction ==
The killing provoked a debate in Japan whether the age of criminal responsibility, lowered from 16 to 14 in 2000 due to the 1997 Kobe child murders, needed to be lowered again. Girl A was considered to be a normal and well-adjusted child before the incident, which made the public more anxious.

Members of the Japanese Diet, such as Kiichi Inoue and Sadakazu Tanigaki, came under criticism for comments made in the wake of the killing. Inoue was criticized for referring to Girl A as genki (vigorous, lively). Tanigaki was criticized for referring to the method of killing, slitting of the throat, as a "manly" act.

Girl A became the subject of an Internet meme on Japanese web communities such as 2channel. She was nicknamed "Nevada-tan" because a class photograph showed a young girl believed to be her wearing a University of Nevada, Reno sweatshirt, with "-tan" being a childlike pronunciation of the Japanese honorific suffix "-chan", generally used to refer to young girls.

Akio Mori cited the case in support of his controversial "game brain" theory, which has been criticized as pseudoscience. Girl A was reported to be a fan of the death-themed Flash animation "Red Room", a claim used in support of the theory. Girl A had also read the controversial novel Battle Royale and had seen its film adaptation, which centers on young students fighting to the death.

On March 18, 2005, during the Okubo Elementary graduation ceremony, students were given a graduation album with a blank page in honor of Mitarai's death, on which they could put pictures of Mitarai, Girl A, or class pictures with both girls. Mitarai was posthumously awarded a graduation certificate, which her father accepted on her behalf. Girl A was also awarded a certificate, as one is required in Japan in order to enter middle school, and the school believed it would aid her "reintegration into society".

== In other media ==
In 2007, German rock band Panik renamed themselves "Nevada Tan". They changed back to the original name in 2008 due to a court dispute with their old producers and managers.

On October 24, 2019, an audio play named Nevada-Tan was released on Audible, written by Leah Nanako Winkler and directed by Moritz von Stuelpnagel. It follows Nick, a young man struggling to escape his loneliness and isolation in the aftermath of the Columbine High School massacre, who develops an obsession with Girl A.

== See also ==
- Murder of Aiwa Matsuo, a 2014 murder in Sasebo
- 2007 Sasebo shooting, a 2007 mass homicide in Sasebo
