= Murder of Aiwa Matsuo =

2014 murder in Japan

On July 26, 2014, 15-year-old female Japanese high school student Aiwa Matsuo (松尾 愛和, Matsuo Aiwa) was murdered by a 15-year-old female classmate. The killing took place in the suspect's apartment in Sasebo, Nagasaki Prefecture, where Matsuo was beaten with a metal tool, strangled to death, and then partially dismembered and decapitated. In Japan, this case is known as the Sasebo high-school girl murder case (佐世保女子高生殺害事件, Sasebo Joshikōsei Satsugai jiken).

== Details ==
The suspect, who was 15 at the time of the crime, but turned 16 shortly after, allegedly posted details and photos of the crime to the popular Japanese message board 2channel, and told police that, "I wanted to kill someone. I bought tools by myself". The suspect had previously attacked her father with a metal baseball bat, prompting him and her step-mother (her biological mother died the previous year) to move her into her own apartment when she began attending high school. It is believed that before the murder, she attempted to "dissect" a cat and possessed several medical textbooks.

== Aftermath ==
In response to the murder, Fuji TV cancelled the July 31, 2014 broadcast of the fourth episode of the re-edited Psycho-Pass anime, which would have also featured murder involving teenage schoolgirls.

The girl's 54-year-old father apologized to Matsuo's family in July 2014 about his daughter's mental health. On October 5, 2014, he was found to have committed suicide by hanging.

In 2014, it was revealed that a psychiatrist who examined the girl had contacted a child consultation center in Nagasaki to reportedly warn officials that "If she is left as she is, she could kill someone." However, this warning was not acted upon, and in 2015, three officials of the Nagasaki Prefectural child consultation center were officially reprimanded by the prefectural government, which stated that the center had "failed to fulfill its duties".

== See also ==
- Killing of Satomi Mitarai, a 2004 murder of a 12-year-old schoolgirl in Sasebo by a female classmate
- 2007 Sasebo shooting, a 2007 double homicide in Sasebo
- Murder of Ryōta Uemura, a 2015 murder of a 13-year-old boy by three other boys in Kawasaki, Kanagawa Prefecture
