= NeuroReport =

- Discipline: Neuroscience
- Language: English
- Edited by: Michael Jakowec, Patric Stanton

Publication details
- History: 1990–present
- Publisher: Lippincott Williams & Wilkins
- Frequency: 18/year
- Impact factor: 1.343 (2016)

Standard abbreviations
- ISO 4: NeuroReport

Indexing
- CODEN: NERPEZ
- ISSN: 0959-4965 (print); 1473-558X (web)
- OCLC no.: 22982547

Links
- Journal homepage; Online access; Online archive

NeuroReport is a peer-reviewed scientific journal covering the field of neuroscience. It was established in 1990 and is published by Lippincott Williams & Wilkins. The editors-in-chief are Michael Jakowec and Patric Stanton. According to the Journal Citation Reports, the journal has a 2016 impact factor of 1.343.
