= Train Your Brain =

Book by Ryuta Kawashima

- Author: Ryuta Kawashima
- Publisher: Penguin Books
- ISBN: 9781846140044

Train Your Brain: 60 Days to a Better Brain is an English-language version of a Japanese book written by Ryuta Kawashima. The original book sold over a million copies in Japan. Dr. Kawashima found that by performing simple mathematical calculations and reading books aloud, one could retain mental clarity and stave off the mental effects of aging. The book is based on this research.

The first half of the book contains simple mathematical calculations intermingled with memory tests and counting tests. The book recommends that one should do a set of maths questions every day and note the time it takes. This is complemented by a memory test, a counting test, and a stroop test (found at the back of the book) which should be undertaken every five days. A set of graphs is provided at the back of the book so that the results of the tests can be logged.

The concepts presented in Train Your Brain would later be used to create the Nintendo DS game Brain Age: Train Your Brain in Minutes a Day!.
