= Ryuta Kawashima =

Japanese neuroscientist (born 1959)

- Born: May 23, 1959 (age 67); Chiba, Chiba Prefecture, Japan
- Education: Tohoku University
- Known for: Portraying Dr. Kawashima in the Brain Age series of video games
- Scientific career
- Fields: Neuroscience

Ryuta Kawashima (川島 隆太, Kawashima Ryūta; [kaɰaɕima ɾʲɨᵝːta]; born May 23, 1959) is a Japanese neuroscientist known for his appearances in the Brain Age series of video games for the Nintendo DS, Nintendo 3DS and Nintendo Switch.

== Biography ==
Kawashima was born May 23, 1959, in Chiba, Chiba Prefecture, Japan. In the 1970s, he enrolled in Tohoku University. After graduating with an M.D. at the school of medicine, he emigrated to Sweden to become a guest researcher at the Karolinska Institute. He moved back to Tohoku and is now a resident Professor with tenure. He is famous in Japan and is a former member of Japan's National Council, concerning Language and Culture.

== Career ==
One of his primary research topics is mapping the regions of the brain to faculties such as emotion, language, memorization, and cognition. Kawashima is trained in neurophysiology and is an expert on brain imaging. His other primary topic involves applying this information to aid children to develop, aging people to retain, and patients to recover their learning facilities. He informed the development, and serves as virtual host, of the Brain Training series of video games (known in American markets as Brain Age). He reportedly refused royalty payments from Nintendo, the games' publisher, on the grounds of a belief that one should only get such an amount of money when one has worked for it.

== Publications and releases ==
In 2001, Ryuta Kawashima conducted a study at Tohoku University in Japan, claiming that frontal lobes are not stimulated during video game playing sessions. However scientists widely dismissed his study after he claimed that the lack of stimulation could potentially stunt brain development and negatively affect people's ability to control their behaviour. Kawashima found no direct evidence for permanent brain damage.

In 2003, Kawashima authored Train Your Brain: 60 Days to a Better Brain, which was a great success in Japan. When released worldwide, it sold more than 2.5 million copies. A handheld stand-alone unit, Brain Trainer, was later developed, and became Brain Age: Train Your Brain in Minutes a Day! for the Nintendo DS, released in May 2005. A sequel, Brain Age 2: More Training in Minutes a Day! was released in December 2005. Both games were a critical and commercial success, selling 19.01 and 14.96 million units worldwide, respectively, making them two of the best-selling Nintendo DS video games. He later participated in the development of two more games for the Nintendo DSi's DSiWare service, both of which taking some puzzles from the previous Brain Age titles while featuring new puzzles as well. Rather than accept them for himself, he has used the royalties from the game (estimated in 2.4 billion yen) to build two laboratories.

In 2007, an English-language version of Train Your Brain was published by Penguin Books. It was followed by a sequel, Train Your Brain More: 60 Days to an Even Better Brain, published in 2008.

In June 2009, Namco Bandai released another video game featuring Kawashima entitled Brain Exercise with Dr. Kawashima for the iPhone OS platform.

Also in June 2009, German developers Chimera Entertainment and BBG Entertainment released Train your Brain with Dr. Kawashima for PC and Mac.

In February 2011, Dr. Kawashima released the video game Body and Brain Connection for Microsoft's Kinect peripheral on Xbox 360.

In 2012, a third game in the Brain Age series, Brain Age: Concentration Training was released for Nintendo 3DS.

In 2014, Super Smash Bros. for Nintendo 3DS and Wii U was released and included a summonable "Assist Trophy" based on Dr. Kawashima's appearances in the Brain Age series, the only character appearing in the Super Smash Bros. series to be directly based on a real person's likeness. He reappears in 2018's Super Smash Bros. Ultimate.

On December 21, 2016, a Super Mario Maker Event Course titled Dr. Kawashima's Athletic Training was released, along with a Mystery Mushroom costume of Dr. Kawashima, unlocked by completing the Event Course.

Dr Kawashima's Brain Training for Nintendo Switch was released on the Nintendo Switch on December 27, 2019, in Japan and January 3, 2020, in Europe.

== See also ==
- Game brain
