= Natsuo Kirino =

Pen name of Mariko Hashioka, a Japanese writer

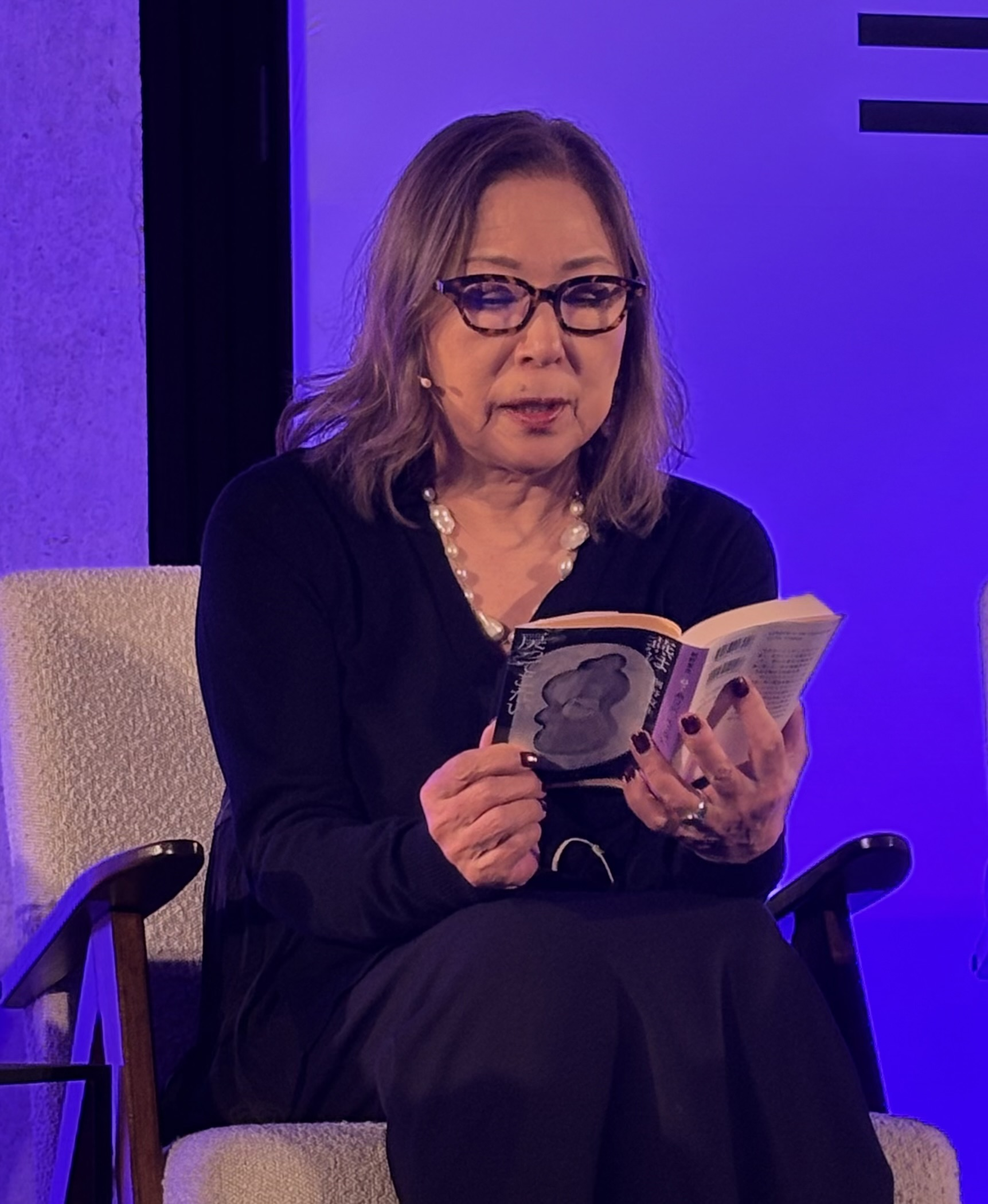
- Natsuo Kirino reading from Swallows at Edinburgh International Book Festival (2026)
- Born: October 7, 1951 (age 75); Kanazawa, Ishikawa Prefecture, Japan
- Occupation: Novelist
- Writing career
- Genres: Thriller, Hardboiled, Social mystery
- Notable work: Out
- Notable awards: Naoki Prize

Natsuo Kirino (桐野 夏生, Kirino Natsuo) (born October 7, 1951, in Kanazawa, Ishikawa Prefecture) is the pen name of Mariko Hashioka, a Japanese novelist and a leading figure in the recent boom of female writers of Japanese detective fiction.

== Biography ==
Kirino was born in 1951 and is the middle child of three. She has two brothers, one who is six years older and one who is five years younger. Their father was an architect and the family often visited many different cities due to his work. Kirino was raised predominantly in Sendai and Sapporo, before she moved to Tokyo at fourteen. Since then, she has continued to live in Tokyo and got married in 1975. In 1981 she gave birth to her daughter.

She earned a law degree in 1974 from Seikei University, and she dabbled in many fields of work before settling on being a writer. Kirino worked at the Iwanami Hall movie theater in her early twenties. She soon discovered it wasn't right for her and just before her thirtieth birthday she started taking scriptwriting classes. It wasn't until she was in her thirties that she began to seriously think about becoming a writer, and it wasn't until her forties that she became popular as a writer.

== Literary career ==
Kirino began her writing career in 1984, when she started composing novels in the romantic genre. However, these types of novels were not popular in Japan, so she found it difficult to make a living while writing them. She also did not have a passion for writing romance novels and wanted to concentrate on works focusing on the psychological aspect of crimes. She then turned her focus towards writing mystery novels in the early 1990s. To date, she has written several short story collections and many novels, and is now one of Japan's most popular writers.

She is most famous for her 1997 novel, Out, which received the Mystery Writers of Japan Award, Japan's top mystery award, and was a finalist (in English translation) for the 2004 Edgar Award. In addition, Kirino received the 1993 Edogawa Rampo Prize for mystery fiction for her debut novel, Kao ni Furikakaru Ame (Rain Falling on My Face), and the 1999 Naoki Prize for her novel Yawarakana hoho (Soft Cheeks). In 2008, Kirino won the Tanizaki Prize for her novel Tokyo Island.

So far, four of her novels (Out, Grotesque, Real World, and The Goddess Chronicle, the last of which was written for the Canongate Myth Series) have been translated into English. A further novel, Swallows is scheduled for publication in 2025.

In spite of writing in stories in the genre, Kirino does not particularly like mysteries. For influential books from her childhood, Kirino cites Two Years' Vacation, The Three Musketeers, and Little Women as favorites.

Many critics challenged and criticized Kirino for her storylines, especially for Out, by saying women should only be writing love stories. In fact, one male radio host refused to talk with her because of the fact she wrote about a husband being murdered by his own wife. However, her fiction has been mirrored by reality with an increasing number of bizarre murders in Japan such as the woman who in 2007 murdered her husband, dismembered his body, and dumped the parts across Tokyo.

== Writing style and themes ==
Kirino's works, such as Out, ask the reader what they would do if something awful happened to them. By writing novels that people can relate to, Kirino hopes her novels can help her readers through hard times and be comforted. She has apparently been successful in reaching readers emotionally; for example Kirino was approached by a woman who thanked her for the liberation she felt after reading Out.

Her work is reminiscent of American hardboiled detective stories, but her use of multiple narratives and perspectives provide "no authoritative master narrative . . . that finally reassures the reader which of the many voices one is to trust". Her prose style has been described as "flat," "functional," and "occasionally illuminated by a strange lyricism." Unlike most hardboiled fiction, Kirino's novels often feature a female protagonist such as her detective Miro Murano, who complicates the typical hardboiled role of females by becoming both detective and victim. By doing this, Kirino "implicates [the reader] in the voyeuristic pleasure of the detective genre by making [the reader] conscious of [the] act of watching." Kirino said she is fascinated by human nature and what makes someone with a completely clean record suddenly turn into a criminal.

In addition to comparisons with hardboiled crime fiction, Kirino's work has been compared with horror fiction (the gruesome dismemberment scenes in Out, for example) and proletarian literature such as Kanikōsen.

Kirino has noted that her work can be viewed as a portrait of contemporary Japanese life, contrasting it with the work of Haruki Murakami, who she feels writes more for a global audience, calling his work "global literature." Critic Sophie Harrison has argued that Kirino presents a less-sanitized version of Japan, far from the stereotypical images of cherry blossoms and Hello Kitty, and deals with sordid subjects such as crime and prostitution in her work.

Loneliness often seems to be a theme in her work, as is the idea that materialism and money have corrupted modern Japanese life, especially where family and romantic relationships are concerned. In fact, Out has been interpreted as "a cautionary tale of personal finance" and "a grim portrayal of Japan's underclasses, of its female characters' lives, and of the social, sexual, and economic injustice that they face."

Most of Kirino's novels center upon women and crime. Typically, in her novels, such as Out, Kirino mainly focuses on women who do unimaginable things, which is why her books can be considered as “feminist noir.” She writes in a convincing, realistic type of way, which leads to the greatness of her work stemming from "her ability to put us inside the skins of these women.” This focus on more realistic portrayals of Japanese women seems to be a trademark of her work, found in many of her novels such as Grotesque. She is also committed to giving women recognition in Japanese literature, where they are often resigned to sexual and domestic roles. The author recounts how a young man once told her that until he read Out, he “never realized that regular middle aged women actually had a life.” Society, she says, takes advantage of powerless women and it is her goal to create empowered female characters to show readers the power of the “weaker sex.” For these reasons, she has been called the "queen of Japanese crime." In fact, the plot of Out has been described as a framework for her critique of "the problems of ordinary women in contemporary Japanese society."

== Works in English translation ==
Crime/thriller novels

- Out (original title: Auto), trans. Stephen Snyder (New York: Kodansha, 2003; New York: Vintage, 2005)

Significance of Title – Kirino explains that the title Out has many meanings attached to it—out as in “off the path” or “exit,” out as in “no good,” and out as in “outside.” She believes there is “a certain kind of freedom in being completely ‘out.’ If you go out one exit, there's another door, and if you open that, you don't know what awaits you" When asked about the broken bonds in the story, the author says she believes there is no such thing as society and that we are essentially solitary creatures. This becomes clear when people unconsciously release their true nature by committing deviant acts. The book's title clearly conveys the experience of being on the outside of social groups.

Reception - Out had an initial print run of 500,000 in Japan. Although Kirino received much criticism for her gruesome and disturbing scenes, Out sold a significantly large number of copies, won the Mystery Writers of Japan Award, and was even made into a film directed by Hideyuki Hirayama, which was released in 2002. According to Variety, New Line Cinema has purchased the rights for an American version, to be directed by Hideo Nakata.

Research - Kirino researches her books for approximately six months. For Out, she visited a pathology autopsy class at a university but was not able to view a real corpse. Instead, she interviewed a pathologist and took notes on the details of their operations, such as wearing goggles while dismembering a body due to the flying shards of bone. “In terms of that dismemberment scene,” Kirino says, “I actually was thinking about cooking while I was writing. When I later heard a doctor say that the description of my novel wasn't far off from the way they do it, I was quite relieved.” Regarding characters, none of hers are modeled after real people, and she stresses that her dark characters do not cast a negative light on her own personhood. Kirino also stated in an LA Weekly interview that "[While writing] Out, I wanted to understand the experience of [working] at a bento factory. An acquaintance of mine happened to know a person who worked at [one]. So for two nights, I worked the night shift. After that, I just had to escape."

- Grotesque (original title: Gurotesuku), trans. Rebecca L. Copeland (New York: Knopf, 2007)
- Real World (original title: Riaru Wārudo), trans. Philip Gabriel (New York: Knopf, 2008)
- Swallows (original title: Tsubame wa Modotte Konai), trans. Lisa Hofmann-Kuroda (Penguin Random House, 2022)

Other novels

- The Goddess Chronicle (original title: Joshinki), trans. Rebecca Copeland (Edinburgh: Canongate Books, 2013)

Short stories

- Tokyo Island (original title: Tōkyō-jima), trans. Philip Gabriel (Granta, No.110, 2010 Spring, p. 31-50)
- In Goats' Eyes Is the Sky Blue? (original title: Yagi no Me wa Sora o Aoku Utsusu ka), trans. Philip Gabriel (Granta's website, July 2010)
- The Floating Forest (original title: Ukishima no Mori), trans. Jonathan W. Lawless (Digital Geishas and Talking Frogs: The Best 21st Century Short Stories from Japan, Cheng & Tsui Company, 2011)

== Awards and nominations ==
Japanese Awards

- 1993 – Edogawa Rampo Prize: Kao ni Furikakaru Ame (Rain Falling on My Face)
- 1998 – Mystery Writers of Japan Award for Best Novel: Out
- 1998 – The Best Japanese Crime Fiction of the Year (Kono Mystery ga Sugoi! 1998): Out
- 1999 – Naoki Prize: Yawarakana Hoho (Soft Cheeks)
- 2003 – Izumi Kyōka Prize for Literature: Grotesque
- 2004 – Shibata Renzaburo Award: Zangyakuki
- 2008 – Tanizaki Prize: Tokyo Island (Novel)
- 2009 – Murasaki Shikibu Prize: The Goddess Chronicle
- 2011 – Yomiuri Prize: Nanika Aru
- 2015 – Japan's Government Medals of Honor (Japan) for distinguished performances and contributions to society.

U.S. Awards

- 2004 – Nominee for Edgar Award for Best Novel: Out

== Major works ==
=== Detective Miro Murano series ===
- Novels
  - Kao ni furikakaru ame (Tokyo: Kodansha, 1993)
  - Tenshi ni misuterareta yoru (Tokyo: Kodansha, 1994)
  - Mizu no nemuri hai no yume (Tokyo: Bungei Shunju, 1998)
  - Dāku [Dark] (Tokyo: Kodansha: 2002)
- Short story collection
  - Rōzu gāden [Rose Garden] (Tokyo: Kodansha, 2000)

=== Fireball Blues ===
- Faiabōru burūsu [Fireball Blues] (Tokyo: Shueisha, 1995)
- Faiabōru burūsu 2 [Fireball Blues 2] (Tokyo: Bungei Shunju, 2001)

=== Standalone novels ===
- Auto (Tokyo: Kodansha, 1997); English translation by Stephen Snyder as Out (New York: Kodansha, 2003; New York: Vintage, 2005)
- Yawarakana hoho (Tokyo: Kodansha, 1999);
- Kogen (Tokyo: Bungei Shunju, 2000)
- Gyokuran (Tokyo: Asahi Shinbunsha, 2001)
- Riaru warudo (Tokyo: Shueisha, 2003); English translation by J. Philip Gabriel as Real World (New York: Alfred A. Knopf, 2008)
- Gurotesuku (Tokyo: Bungei Shunju, 2003); English translation by Rebecca L. Copeland as Grotesque (New York: Knopf, 2007)
- Zangyakuki (Tokyo: Shinchosha, 2004)
- Aimu sōrī mama [I'm sorry, mama.] (Tokyo: Shueisha, 2004)
- Tamamoe! (Tokyo: Mainichi Shinbunsha, 2005)
- Bōken no kuni (Tokyo: Shinchosha, 2005)
- Metabora (Tokyo: Asahi Shinbunsha, 2007)
- Tōkyō-jima (Tokyo: Shinchosha, 2008)
- Joshinki (Tokyo: Kadokawa Shoten, 2008); English translation by Rebecca L. Copeland as The Goddess Chronicle (Edinburgh: Canongate Books, 2013)
- In [In] (Tokyo: Shueisha, 2009)
- Nanika aru (Tokyo: Shinchosha, 2010)
- Yasashii Otona (Tokyo: Chuokoron-Shinsha, 2010)
- Poritikon (Tokyo: Bungei Shunju, 2011)
- Midori no doku (Tokyo: Kadokawa Shoten, 2011)
- Hapinesu [Happiness] (Tokyo: Kōbunsha, 2013)

=== Short story collections ===
- Sabiru kokoro (Tokyo: Bungei Shunju, 1997)
- Jiorama [Diorama] (Tokyo: Shinchosha, 1998)
- Ambosu mundosu [Ambos Mundos] (Tokyo: Bungei Shunju, 2005)

== See also ==
- Japanese literature
- List of detective fiction authors
- List of female detective/mystery writers
