= List of Nintendo development teams =

- Number of locations: 6 (Japan, United States, France, China, Canada, Singapore)
- Services: Nintendo Switch Online
- Number of employees: 1,000+
- Parent: Nintendo
- Divisions: Nintendo Entertainment Planning & Development; Nintendo Technology Development; Nintendo Business Development
- Subsidiaries: List of subsidiaries: 1-Up Studio; iQue; Mario Club; Monolith Soft; Next Level Games; Nintendo Cube; Nintendo European Research & Development; Nintendo Pictures; Nintendo Software Technology; Nintendo Studios Singapore; Nintendo Systems; Nintendo Technology Development; Retro Studios; Shiver Entertainment; SRD

Nintendo is one of the world's biggest video game development companies, having created several successful franchises. Because of its storied history, the developer employs a methodical system of software and hardware development that is mainly centralized within its offices in Kyoto and Tokyo, in cooperation with its division Nintendo of America in Redmond, Washington. The company also owns several worldwide subsidiaries and funds partner affiliates that contribute technology and software for the Nintendo brand.

== Main offices ==
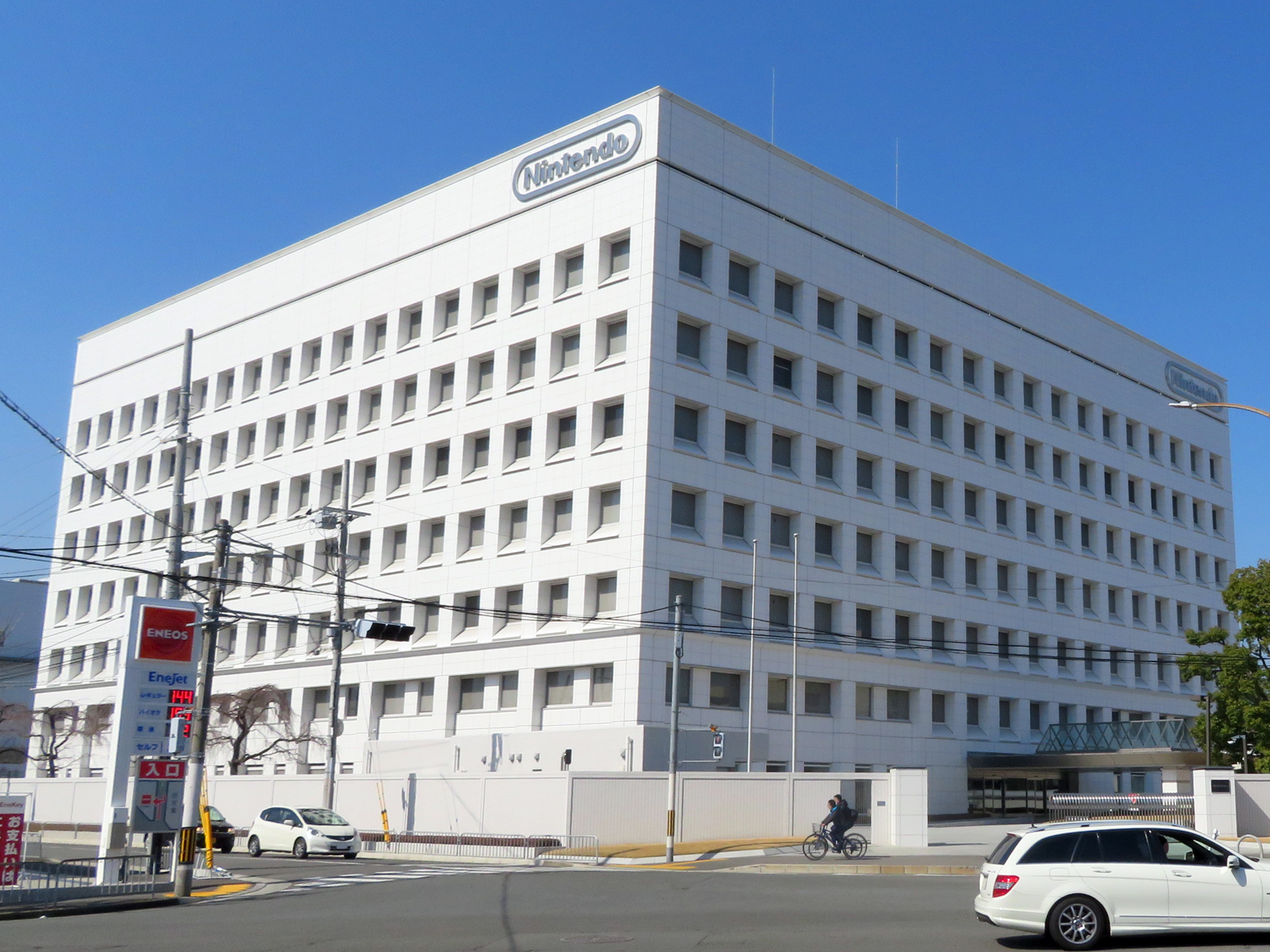
Nintendo Central Office

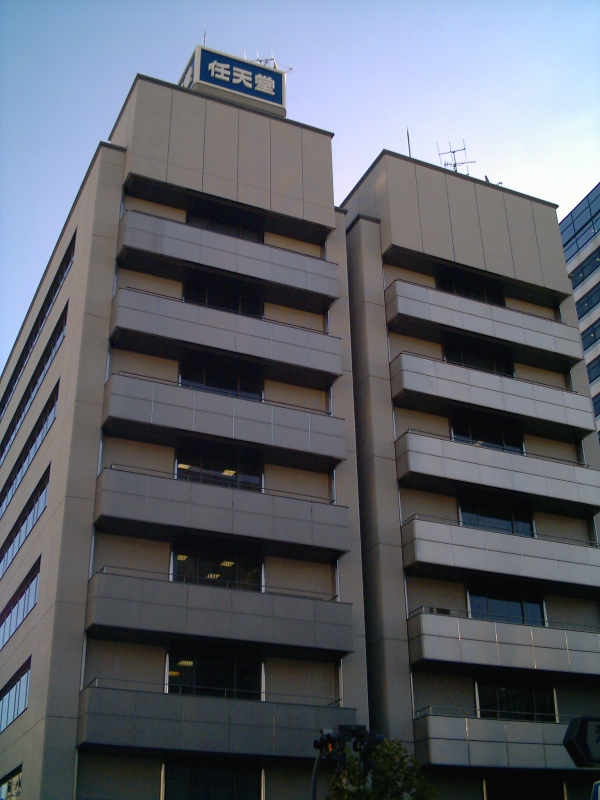
The old Nintendo Tokyo Office in Asakusabashi

Nintendo (NCL) has a central office located in Minami-ku, Kyoto, Kyoto Prefecture, Japan (34°58′11.89″N 135°45′22.33″E) and a nearby building, its pre-2000 headquarters, now serving as a research and development building, located in Higashiyama-ku, Kyoto, Kyoto Prefecture, Japan (34°58′29.00″N 135°46′10.48″E). Its original Kyoto headquarters can still be found at (34°59′30.03″N 135°45′58.66″E). Additionally, Nintendo has a third operation in Tokyo, Japan, where research and development and manufacturing are conducted. All three offices are interconnected and have video conferences, often for communication and presentation purposes.

In 2009, it was revealed that Nintendo was expanding both its Redmond and Kyoto offices. The new office building complex of Nintendo of America in Redmond is 275,250 square feet (25,572 m^{2}) and would expand its localization, development, debugging, production, and clerical teams. Nintendo announced the purchase of a 40,000 square-meter lot that would house an all-new research and development (R&D) office that would make it easier for the company's two other Kyoto R&D offices to collaborate as well as expand the total workforce on new upcoming console development and new software for current and future hardware. Additionally, Nintendo has various subsidiaries and offices worldwide that contribute to the company's global operations.

Nintendo owns several buildings throughout Kyoto and Tokyo, housing subsidiary and affiliated companies. One of the more famous buildings was the Nihonbashi, Chuo-ku, Tokyo building – previously known as the Nintendo Tokyo Prefecture Building – was jokingly called The Pokémon Building, formerly accommodated the complete Pokémon family which included The Pokémon Company, Creatures Inc., and Genius Sonority. It was also to home to HAL Laboratory's Tokyo R&D Center and Warpstar's Tokyo office until 2003, where they moved into HAL's office in the Nintendo Kanda Building in Sudachō in 2003, which previously housed Creatures Inc. until 2001. Genius Sonority would move out of the building to a new building in Kanda in 2005, while Nintendo would fully move out of the building when The Pokémon Company and Creatures relocated their offices to Kaigan and Gobanchō, respectively in 2007. The Asakusabashi building used to be the headquarters of NDcube until 2004, when they moved out to a nearby building.

In 2020, Nintendo revealed that they were going to unify all four of their buildings in Tokyo into just one. With this, several divisions and affiliated companies came to be together in the same building, including Game Freak, Nintendo's subsidiary 1-Up Studio and after 13 years, HAL Laboratory with its Tokyo studio and headquarters.

In 2021, The Nikkei reported that Nintendo was planning to expand internal development by renting an office facility adjacent to their headquarters and building a new development office around the site of their former headquarters. The latter plan was later revealed in April 2022, as Nintendo acquired land next to their headquarters to be used as another development office, which was slated to open in 2027, but was later moved to 2028. In June 2026, Nintendo announced that construction of the building will now end on March 2029, now receiving its official name, Nintendo Technology Development Center.

=== Buildings ===
Nintendo Research & Development Buildings
Name	Location	Developer(s)
Asia
Nintendo Central Office	Hokotate-cho, Kamitoba, Minami-ku, Kyoto, Japan	formerly Nintendo EAD, SPD (and formerly R&D1 and R&D2), IRD, RED, SDD, Systems Research & Development (SRD)
Nintendo Kyoto Research Institute	Kamitakamatsu-cho, Fukuine, Higashiyama-ku, Kyoto, Japan	formerly Nintendo EAD, R&D1, R&D2, R&D3, RED, SPD, Intelligent Systems (moved into a new building next near Nintendo Central Offices in 2013), currently Mario Club
Nintendo Kyoto Development Complex	Minamimatsuda-cho, Higashikujo, Minami-ku, Kyoto, Japan	Was originally scheduled to open at the end of December 2013, but did not until June 2014. Currently houses the Entertainment Planning & Development (EPD), Nintendo Technology Development (TDD), and Business Development divisions, and the Kyoto office of Nintendo Systems. An additional office for SRD is also located here. Formerly Mario Club's Kyoto Minami office.
Nintendo Technology Development Center	Hokotate-cho, Kamitoba, Minami-ku, Kyoto, Japan	Located next to their headquarters, the opening of the building was originally scheduled to happen in 2027, but has since been delayed to 2028 and once again to 2029. The building will have 10 floors, with 9 above and 1 underground, and will be used as a new research and development base for Nintendo’s software and hardware teams.
Kyoto City Water Supply and Sewerage Bureau	Hokotate-cho, Kamitoba Minami-ku, Kyoto, Japan	Office building finished in May 2022. The building currently has its 6th office for Monolith Soft Kyoto and the 7th office for Mario Club.
Nintendo Tokyo Office	Nishikichō, Chiyoda, Tokyo, Japan	Located in a new office building named Kanda Square, that now contains divisions from Nintendo and different companies from four different locations in Tokyo, now reunited in one place to boost efficiency, with Nintendo themselves occupying the 8th, 20th and 21st floors, with the 8th floor housing their main office and their sales department. Replaced the former Nintendo Tokyo Office. Currently home to Nintendo EPD Tokyo, 1-Up Studio (20th floor) and the main office of Nintendo Pictures. The building also houses Game Freak on the 7th floor, as well as Nintendo Stars and HAL Laboratory's Head Office and Tokyo R&D Center on the 5th floor until 2026.
Suzhou Center	Suzhou, China	iQue
Infinite Studios	Singapore	Nintendo Studios Singapore
America
Nintendo of America Headquarters	Redmond, Washington, US	Nintendo Software Technology (NST) and Nintendo Technology Development (NTD)
Europe
Rue Réaumur	Paris, France	Nintendo European Research & Development (NERD)

=== Former offices ===
- Nintendo Tokyo Prefecture Building – Nihonbashi, Chuo, Tokyo, Japan – closed in 2007
- Nintendo Kanda Building – Sudachō, Chiyoda, Tokyo, Japan – closed in 2020, demolished in 2025
- Nintendo Tokyo Office (previous) – Asakusabashi, Taitō, Tokyo, Japan – closed in 2020

== Divisions ==
=== Entertainment Planning and Development (EPD) ===
The Nintendo Entertainment Planning & Development division was created on 16 September 2015, as part of a company-wide organizational restructure that took place under Nintendo's then newly appointed president, Tatsumi Kimishima. The division was created after the merger of two of its largest divisions, Entertainment Analysis & Development (EAD) and Software Planning & Development (SPD).

The division assumed both of its predecessors' roles, focusing on the development of games and software for Nintendo platforms and mobile devices; it also manages and licenses the company's various intellectual properties. Shinya Takahashi, formerly general manager of the SPD division, serves as general manager of the new division, as well as supervisor for both the Business Development and Development Administration & Support divisions. Katsuya Eguchi and Yoshiaki Koizumi maintained their positions as Deputy General Managers of EPD, which they previously held under EAD.

=== Technology Development Division (TDD) ===
The Nintendo Technology Development division was created on 16 September 2015, as part of a company-wide organizational restructure that took place under Nintendo's then newly appointed president, Tatsumi Kimishima. The division was created after the merger of two of Nintendo's divisions, the Integrated Research & Development (IRD), which specialized in hardware development, and System Development (SDD), which specialized operating system development and its development environment and network services.

The new division assumed both of its predecessors' roles. Ko Shiota, formerly Deputy general manager of the IRD division, serves as the general manager, while Takeshi Shimada, formerly Deputy general manager of the Software Environment Development Department of the SDD division, serves the same role.

=== Business Development Division (BDD) ===
The Nintendo Business Development division was formed following Nintendo's foray into software development for smart devices, such as mobile phones and tablets, in March 2014. They are responsible for refining Nintendo's business model for dedicated game system business, and for furthering Nintendo's venture into development for smart devices.

== Game development subsidiaries ==
While most external first-party software development is done in Japan, Nintendo owns several overseas development subsidiaries, those being Nintendo Software Technology, Nintendo Technology Development, Retro Studios, and Shiver Entertainment in the United States, Nintendo European Research & Development in France, IQue in China, Next Level Games in Canada and Nintendo Studios Singapore in Singapore.

Although these studios are all subsidiaries of Nintendo, they are often referred to as external resources when being involved in joint development processes with Nintendo's internal developers by the Nintendo Entertainment Planning & Development division, while the division itself oversees and is involved in the production of the games developed under the studios that lead their own games.

Name	Location	Works
1-Up Studio	Tokyo, Japan	Magical Vacation series, Mother 3 and A Kappa's Trail. Currently, a development support studio for Nintendo EPD in titles such as Super Mario 3D World, Super Mario Odyssey, Ring Fit Adventure and Mario Kart World.
iQue	Suzhou, China	Previously, a manufacturer of Chinese versions of Nintendo consoles. Since 2016 it has handled Simplified Chinese translation/localization, and – since 2019 – has moved from console manufacture to become a QA support studio, hiring programmers and testers to support Nintendo games. Developed NES, Game Boy, and N64 emulators for use in Virtual Console and Nintendo Switch Online.
Mario Club	Kyoto, Japan	Script and game design. Quality control, technical assistance, asian localization coordination, service support, general affairs and IT support
Monolith Soft	Tokyo, Japan	Xenoblade series, Baten Kaitos series and Disaster: Day of Crisis. Development support for The Legend of Zelda: Breath of the Wild and The Legend of Zelda: Tears of the Kingdom.
Monolith Soft	Kyoto, Japan	Development support studio for Monolith Soft Tokyo and Nintendo EPD. Development support with art and designs for Splatoon, Splatoon 2, Pikmin 3, Animal Crossing: New Horizons, Splatoon 3, Mario Kart World and other Nintendo EPD titles, alongside support for Monolith Soft Tokyo games such as the Xenoblade series.
Next Level Games	Vancouver, British Columbia, Canada	Luigi's Mansion series, Super Mario Strikers series, Punch-Out!! and Metroid Prime: Federation Force.
Nintendo Cube	Tokyo, Japan	Wii Party series, Mario Party series and Clubhouse Games: 51 Worldwide Classics.
Nintendo Cube	Sapporo, Japan	Wii Party series, Mario Party series and Clubhouse Games: 51 Worldwide Classics.
Nintendo European Research & Development	Paris, France	Formerly known as Mobiclip, doing various software technologies such as console emulation, video compression, and middleware, including the emulators for Nintendo Switch Online and the video player of the Wii U Internet Browser.
Nintendo Pictures	Tokyo, Japan	Animation studio specialized in animation, design, and cinematic work. The studio works both on animation and as a support studio for Nintendo games
Nintendo Software Technology	Redmond, Washington, US	Mario vs. Donkey Kong series, F-Zero 99, Wii Street U and other games and apps, helped with WebKit's JavaScript JIT. Closely associated with the DigiPen Institute of Technology.
Nintendo Studios Singapore	Singapore	Formerly known as Bandai Namco Studios Singapore prior to being acquired in April 2026. Previously provided support on Bandai Namco developed projects, including Nintendo collaborations Mario Sports Superstars, New Pokémon Snap, and Kirby Air Riders, as well as for Nintendo EPD games like Splatoon 3 and Tomodachi Life: Living the Dream. Was reportedly heavily involved with the original version of Metroid Prime 4 and also developed the original title Hirogami. Specializes in in-game art assets.
Nintendo Systems	Tokyo, Japan	Joint venture between Nintendo (80%) and DeNA (20%), and a subsidiary of Nintendo. Works on multiple services for Nintendo systems, including Nintendo eShop, Nintendo Accounts and GameChat. Head Office in Tokyo and Development teams in Kyoto.
Nintendo Systems	Kyoto, Japan	Joint venture between Nintendo (80%) and DeNA (20%), and a subsidiary of Nintendo. Works on multiple services for Nintendo systems, including Nintendo eShop, Nintendo Accounts and GameChat. Head Office in Tokyo and Development teams in Kyoto.
Nintendo Technology Development	Redmond, Washington, US	Video game console development and software technology.
Retro Studios	Austin, Texas, US	Metroid Prime and Donkey Kong Country series.
Shiver Entertainment	Miami, Florida, US	Porting video games to Nintendo platforms, including Hogwarts Legacy to the Nintendo Switch and the WWE 2K series to Nintendo Switch 2.
SRD	Kyoto, Japan	Development support for Nintendo EPD, focusing mainly on programming.

=== 1-Up Studio ===
1-Up Studio Co., Ltd. (１‐UPスタジオ株式会社), formerly Brownie Brown Inc. (ブラウニーブラウン, Buraunī Buraun), is a Japanese Nintendo-funded and owned video game development studio opened on 30 June 2000 and based in Tokyo, Japan. On 1 February 2013, Brownie Brown announced on their official website that due to their recent co-development efforts with Nintendo, Brownie Brown are undergoing a change in internal structure, which includes changing the name of their company to 1-Up Studio.

The studio is known for the development of the Magical Vacation series, Mother 3 and A Kappa's Trail. Since 2013, it stands as a development support studio for Nintendo EPD.

=== iQue ===
Originally a Chinese joint venture between its founder, Wei Yen, and Nintendo, manufactures and distributes official Nintendo consoles and games for the mainland Chinese market, under the iQue brand. The product lineup for the Chinese market is considerably different from that for other markets. For example, Nintendo's only console in China is the iQue Player, a modified version of the Nintendo 64. In 2013, the company became a fully owned subsidiary of Nintendo.

It became a translation and localization company for simplified Chinese since 2016 for Nintendo games. In 2018, it stopped to be a manufacturer for consoles at China and in 2019 began to hire programmers and testers to transition to be a QA department for Nintendo.

=== Mario Club ===
Originally a division within Nintendo itself, Mario Club Co., Ltd. was spin-off into a separated subsidiary in July 2009. The company works on game design and script as support for Nintendo titles, and handles quality control, technical assistance, asian localization coordination, service support, general affairs and IT support for Nintendo. As of September 2025, has 432 employees.

=== Monolith Soft ===
Monolith Soft, Inc. (株式会社モノリスソフト, Kabushiki-Gaisha Monorisu Sofuto) is a Japanese video game development company that has created video games for the PlayStation 2, GameCube, Wii, Nintendo DS, and cell phones. The company currently has two main studios, its Tokyo Software Development Studio, which is housed in the company's headquarters, and the recently opened Kyoto Software Development Studio. The company was previously owned by Namco Bandai Games, until 2007 when Namco Bandai transferred 80% of its 96% stake to Nintendo. In 2011, the remaining 16% was sold, and by late 2024, Nintendo had bought the last 4%, which had originally been left to the company's founders. A majority of Monolith Soft's staff are former employees of Square Co., who transferred to the new company shortly after the creation of Chrono Cross. They were previously involved with the creation of Xenogears, from which the Xenosaga series is derived.

Monolith Soft's Tokyo Software Development Studio is usually associated with the Xeno series, the Baten Kaitos series and Disaster: Day of Crisis, while its Kyoto Software Development Studio is currently a development co-operation studio.

=== Next Level Games ===
Next Level Games is a Canadian video game developer based in Vancouver. The company has been working with Nintendo since 2005 with Super Mario Strikers, while since 2014, the company began to work exclusively under contract with Nintendo. In January 2021, Nintendo revealed they had purchased Next Level Games, after over a decade working with the developer per contract basis and 6 years having them working exclusively.

Next Level Games has worked on the two most recent entries in the Luigi's Mansion series, the Mario Strikers series, Punch-Out!! for the Wii, and Metroid Prime: Federation Force for the Nintendo 3DS.

=== Nintendo Cube ===
Nintendo Cube Co., Ltd. (ニンテンドーキューブ株式会社 NintendōKyūbu Kabushiki Gaisha), formerly NDcube, is a Nintendo subsidiary and Japanese video game developer based in Japan with offices in Tokyo and Sapporo. The company was founded on 1 March 2000, through a joint venture between Nintendo and advertising firm Dentsu, hence the Nd in the name. In 2010, Nintendo decided to buy out 96% of the shares, with ad partner Dentsu stepping aside. Since Nintendo Cube was founded, they have worked on various Japanese GameCube and Game Boy Advance titles. Two notable games that have gained popularity in western markets are F-Zero: Maximum Velocity and Tube Slider. As seen in the credits for Mario Party 9, Nintendo Cube houses many ex-Hudson Soft employees, some vary between folks who have focused primarily on many other entries in the Mario Party series.

The company is currently best known for the Wii Party series and for taking over the Mario Party series, after Hudson Soft was absorbed into Konami.

=== Nintendo European Research and Development (NERD) ===
Nintendo European Research & Development SAS (or NERD), formerly known as Mobiclip, is a Nintendo subsidiary, located in Paris, France. The team currently focuses on developing software technologies, such as console emulation, video compression, and middleware for Nintendo platforms. While an independent company, Mobiclip was responsible for licensing video codecs for Sony Pictures Digital, Fisher-Price and Nintendo for the Game Boy Advance, Nintendo DS, Wii and Nintendo 3DS.

The team has been involved in the development of the Wii U Chat application, in co-operation with Vidyo, and has since contributed to developing emulators for prior Nintendo consoles, such as those for Nintendo Switch Online.

=== Nintendo Pictures ===
The company was founded by Hiroshi Hirokawa on March 18, 2011, in Tokyo, Japan under the name of Dynamo Pictures. Nintendo announced their intent to acquire Dynamo Pictures and change its name to Nintendo Pictures on July 14, 2022, citing the focus of the company to strengthen the planning and production structure of visual content. The deal closed on October 3, with the company becoming a full subsidiary of Nintendo, as well as adopting its new name. Since being acquired by Nintendo in 2022, they have functioned as a support studio specializing in animation, design, and cinematic work for video games developed by Nintendo Entertainment Planning & Development.

=== Nintendo Software Technology (NST) ===
Nintendo Software Technology Corp. (or NST) is an American video game developer located inside of Nintendo of America's headquarters in Redmond, Washington. The studio was created by Nintendo as a first-party developer to create games for the North American market, though their games have also been released in other territories such as Europe and Japan, exclusively for Nintendo consoles.

The studio's best known projects include the Mario vs. Donkey Kong series, F-Zero 99, Crosswords series, Wii Street U and other video games and applications.

=== Nintendo Studios Singapore ===
Nintendo Studios Singapore Pte. Ltd. is a Singaporean video game developer. It was previously a subsidiary of Bandai Namco Studios, named Bandai Namco Studios Singapore. Founded in 2013, the company had assisted in development specifically focused in-game art assets for Bandai Namco games such as Soulcalibur VI and Ace Combat 7: Skies Unknown and for Nintendo games such as Splatoon 3 and Kirby Air Riders. In April 2026, Nintendo purchased 80% of the shares of the studio from Bandai Namco, making it a subsidiary and noting that the acquisition was made to strengthen its development structure.

=== Nintendo Systems ===
Nintendo Systems Co., Ltd. is a joint venture company between Nintendo and DeNA with the first owning 80% of shares, therefore making it a subsidiary, and the second owning 20%. The company works on multiple services for Nintendo systems, including the Nintendo eShop and Nintendo Accounts. The company was established in 2023 with Nintendo's Tetsuya Sasaki as its representative director and president.

=== Nintendo Technology Development (NTD) ===
Nintendo Technology Development Inc. (or NTD) is a Washington-based hardware focused Research & Development subsidiary for Nintendo. The group focuses on the creation of various software technologies, hardware tools, and SDKs for first-party use and third-party licensing across Nintendo platforms, in collaboration with the Nintendo Platform Technology Development division.

Several side projects and unreleased prototypes are commonly linked to this Washington based subsidiary. NTD is also responsible for some low-level coding. Howard Cheng serves as the company president.

=== Retro Studios ===
Retro Studios, Inc. is an American video game developer based in Austin, Texas. The company was founded in October 1998 by Nintendo and the video game veteran Jeff Spangenberg after leaving Acclaim Entertainment, as an independent studio making games exclusively for Nintendo. The studio started with four GameCube projects which had a chaotic and unproductive development, and did not impress Nintendo producer Shigeru Miyamoto, but he suggested they create a new game in the Metroid series. Eventually the four games in development were cancelled so Retro could focus only on Metroid Prime, which was released for the GameCube in 2002, the same year Nintendo acquired the studio completely by purchasing the majority of Spangenberg's holding stock.

Retro Studios would develop sequels to Metroid Prime, which had expanded to a successful sub-series of the Metroid series. Outside of Metroid, they had assisted in Mario Kart 7 and revived the Donkey Kong Country series after original developer Rare's purchase by Microsoft.

=== Shiver Entertainment ===
Shiver Entertainment, Inc. is an American video game developer based in Miami, Florida. It was founded in 2012 by John Schappert, previously of Zynga. In its earliest years, the company developed mobile games with Nexon; State Of Chaos and Beasts vs Bots were released under this deal. The studio would form a working relationship with Warner Bros. Games, developing the Nintendo Switch ports for Hogwarts Legacy, Mortal Kombat 11 and Mortal Kombat 1. They also succeeded 5th Cell in the Scribblenauts series, developing Scribblenauts Showdown and Scribblenauts Mega Pack.

Shiver was acquired by Embracer Group in 2021, who placed the studio under Saber Interactive. Shiver had 17 employees at the time. Following Saber Interactive's sale to Beacon Interactive, the company was moved under Embracer Group until Nintendo acquired them in May 2024. Bloomberg News reported that the acquisition was for bolstering Nintendo's efforts in securing games from third-party developers on their upcoming console, the Nintendo Switch 2, with Shiver assisting external developers in the optimization of such games from competing platforms. Following the acquisition, Shiver has assisted 2K Games in porting titles in their WWE 2K and NBA 2K video game sports series to the Switch 2.

=== SRD ===
SRD Co., Ltd. (trade name SRD Corporation), also known as Systems Research and Development, is a Nintendo subsidiary located in Shimogyō-ku, Kyoto, with an additional office in Nintendo's development headquarters in Minami-ku, Kyoto. The company was founded on 22 January 1979 and began working with Nintendo in 1983, programming games such as Donkey Kong (1981) and Super Mario Bros. (1985) for the Nintendo Entertainment System. They built an early test version of Super Mario Bros. SRD became a prolific Nintendo partner. It exclusively programmed games for Nintendo and worked on around one hundred of them. SRD contributed to the Mario and Animal Crossing franchises, most of The Legend of Zelda, and some of Nintendo's more experimental projects, such as Nintendo Labo and Game Builder Garage. On 1 April 2022, SRD became a wholly owned subsidiary of Nintendo. Toshihiko Nakago is the Representative Director and President of the company.

== Affiliate companies ==
Major and minor affiliate development companies, per contract or under significant owned stake
Name	Works
Arika	Endless Ocean series, Dr. Mario series (2008-2015), 3D Classics series, Tetris 99, Super Mario Bros. 35
Bandai Namco Studios	Mario Kart (with Nintendo EAD and Nintendo EPD; 2014-present), Mario Super Sluggers, Wii Sports Club (with Nintendo EAD), Super Smash Bros. series (with Sora Ltd.; 2014-present), Kirby Air Riders (with Sora Ltd.), Pokkén Tournament, New Pokémon Snap
Camelot Software Planning	Golden Sun series, Mario Golf series, Mario Tennis series, Mario Sports Superstars (with Bandai Namco Studios)
Creatures	Mother series, Pokémon Trading Card Game, Pokémon Ranger series, PokéPark Wii: Pikachu's Adventure, Detective Pikachu series, Pokémon Trading Card Game Pocket (with DeNA)
DeNA	Service infrastructure, My Nintendo integration and development cooperation on mobile applications of the partnership with Nintendo like Miitomo, Super Mario Run, Fire Emblem Heroes, Animal Crossing: Pocket Camp and Mario Kart Tour. Outside of games in the Nintendo Mobile branding, DeNA also developed Pokémon Masters EX and Pokémon Trading Card Game Pocket, the latter with Creatures.
Eighting	Kuru Kuru Kururin series, Master of Illusion, Pikmin series (with Nintendo EPD from Pikmin 3 Deluxe onwards), Nintendo Switch Sports basketball update co-development (with Nintendo EPD)
Game Freak	Mainline Pokémon series, Mario & Wario, Drill Dozer, HarmoKnight, Pocket Card Jockey
Genius Sonority	Pokémon Colosseum, Pokémon XD: Gale of Darkness, Pokémon Trozei!, Pokémon Battle Revolution, Pokémon Shuffle, Pokémon Café ReMix
Good-Feel	Wario Land: Shake It!, Looksley's Line Up, Kirby's Epic Yarn (with HAL Laboratory), Mario & Luigi: Dream Team (development support on Giant Battles for AlphaDream), various StreetPass games, Yoshi's Woolly World, Miitopia (development support for Nintendo EPD), Yoshi's Crafted World, Princess Peach: Showtime!, Yoshi and the Mysterious Book
Grezzo	The Legend of Zelda: Ocarina of Time 3D, The Legend of Zelda: Four Swords Anniversary Edition, The Legend of Zelda: Majora's Mask 3D, The Legend of Zelda: Tri Force Heroes (with Nintendo EPD), Ever Oasis, Luigi's Mansion (3DS), The Legend of Zelda: Link's Awakening (Switch), Miitopia (Switch), The Legend of Zelda: Echoes of Wisdom (with Nintendo EPD)
HAL Laboratory	Kirby series, Mother series, Super Smash Bros. series (1999-2008), Pokémon Stadium series, Picross 3D, BoxBoy! series, Part Time UFO
Hamster Corporation	Select Arcade Archives titles
ILCA	Pokémon Home, Pokémon Brilliant Diamond and Shining Pearl, Pokémon Scarlet and Violet (planning and story work)
indieszero	Sennen Kazoku, Sutte Hakkun, Electroplankton, Personal Trainer: Cooking, NES Remix series (with Nintendo EAD), Sushi Striker: The Way of Sushido, Dr Kawashima's Brain Training for Nintendo Switch (with Nintendo EPD), Big Brain Academy: Brain vs. Brain (with Nintendo EPD), Nintendo World Championships: NES Edition (with Nintendo EPD)
Intelligent Systems	Fire Emblem series, Wars series, Paper Mario series, WarioWare series, Pushmo series
Koei Tecmo	Fatal Frame series, Metroid: Other M (developed by Team Ninja with Nintendo SPD), Hyrule Warriors series (developed by Team Ninja, Omega Force and AAA Games Studio), Fire Emblem Warriors series (developed by Team Ninja and Omega Force), Marvel Ultimate Alliance 3: The Black Order (developed by Team Ninja), Fire Emblem: Three Houses (with Intelligent Systems), Pokémon Pokopia (with Game Freak)
MAGES	Famicom Detective Club series (with Nintendo EPD for Emio - The Smiling Man: Famicom Detective Club)
MercurySteam	Metroid: Samus Returns, Metroid Dread, Metroid Ravenous (all with Nintendo EPD)
Panic Button	Third-party Nintendo Switch ports; Nintendo Switch 2 upgrade patches for Arms, Super Mario Odyssey, New Super Mario Bros. U Deluxe and Super Mario 3D World + Bowser's Fury (with Nintendo EPD)
PlatinumGames	Bayonetta series, The Wonderful 101 (Wii U version only; 2013), Star Fox Zero, Star Fox Guard (both with Nintendo EPD), Astral Chain
Scopely	Pokémon Go, Pikmin Bloom (taking over both from Niantic post-launch)
Sega	F-Zero GX, F-Zero AX, Mario & Sonic series, Bayonetta series (2014-present), Tokyo Mirage Sessions ♯FE (developed by Atlus)
Sora Ltd.	Meteos (with Q Entertainment and Bandai), Super Smash Bros. Brawl (with HAL Laboratory, Game Arts and Monolith Soft), Kid Icarus: Uprising (with Project Sora), Super Smash Bros. for Nintendo 3DS and Wii U, Super Smash Bros. Ultimate, Kirby Air Riders (all with Bandai Namco Studios)
Tantalus Media	The Legend of Zelda: Twilight Princess HD, The Legend of Zelda: Skyward Sword HD, Luigi's Mansion 2 HD
Tose	Famicom Detective Club series, Game & Watch Gallery series, The Legendary Starfy series, Super Princess Peach, Fortune Street. Development support for Advance Wars: Days of Ruin, Dr. Mario: Miracle Cure, Fire Emblem Fates, Paper Mario series (2016-present), The Legend of Zelda: Breath of the Wild, Splatoon 2, WarioWare series (2018-present), Animal Crossing: New Horizons, and Famicom Detective Club: The Missing Heir and The Girl Who Stands Behind.
Ubisoft	Mario + Rabbids series
Velan Studios	Mario Kart Live: Home Circuit, Star Fox

== Former divisions and subsidiaries ==
Name	Active	Additional details	Fate
Nintendo Research & Development 1 (Nintendo R&D1)	1970–2004	The original game development team at Nintendo. Originally created in the 1970s by Hiroshi Yamauchi as the games division of Nintendo Co., Ltd. Gunpei Yokoi was the original engineer and inventor designated to create electronic toys and arcade coin-operated software. With the conception of the Famicom (known as the Nintendo Entertainment System in the West), the Virtual Boy, and Game Boy, the group was reassigned to concentrate on developing the premier software for console and portable gaming straying away from its original toys, Game & Watch, and arcade roots.	Nintendo EAD Nintendo SPD Nintendo RED
Nintendo Research & Development 2 (Nintendo R&D2)	1978–2004	This group mainly concentrated on hardware technology and system operating tools. Masayuki Uemura was hired away from Sharp Corporation where he specialized in solar cell technology. The solar technology fueled the original bean gun games which Nintendo introduced to huge success. The team would go on to develop several peripherals and eventually even some video game software. The team generally assisted Nintendo R&D1 and Nintendo R&D3 with their arcade games, but it also became the first team to specialize in software ports at Nintendo with the task of porting all the original arcade titles like Donkey Kong to the Famicom.	Nintendo EAD Nintendo SPD
Nintendo Research & Development 3 (Nintendo R&D3)	1980–2000	Originally created as a hardware engineering division, Genyo Takeda managed to diversify his group and create software on the same arcade boards being designed for Gunpei Yokoi's R&D1 team. After developing the arcade hits like Sheriff, Punch-Out!! and Arm Wrestling, the team was involved in developing a variety of unique software for the NES that was mainly aimed at the Western market, Mike Tyson's Punch-Out and StarTropics to name a few. The team also helped create bank switching and the MMC chips in the NES cartridges.	Nintendo IRD
Nintendo Research & Development 4 (Nintendo R&D4)	1983–1989	In 1984, Hiroshi Yamauchi, former president of Nintendo, rewarded Shigeru Miyamoto his own development studio after proving himself his ability to consistently produce both critically acclaimed and successful video games with the original Donkey Kong and Mario Bros.. Although the team didn't have as many resources as Nintendo R&D1, R&D4 also focused on developing NES games. It ended up creating Nintendo's two most enduring franchises: Mario and The Legend of Zelda. During the development of the Super NES, Nintendo R&D4 was renamed Nintendo EAD. Takashi Tezuka joined Shigeru Miyamoto in developing R&D4 games, with music composition being handled by Koji Kondo.	Nintendo EAD
Nintendo Tokyo R&D Products	1987–1989	In the early 1980s, Nintendo planned to expand software R&D into the Tokyo manufacturing branch building to operate alongside its overcrowded Kyoto headquarters. The initial plans became delayed and shortly after the development of the original Mother, the group ceased development.	—N/a
Nintendo Entertainment Analysis & Development (Nintendo EAD)	1989–2015	Nintendo Entertainment Analysis & Development was the premier development arm at Nintendo. The group had the largest concentration of R&D, housing more than 800 engineers and designers. The division was split into seven different subdivisions, each led by a designated producer and group manager. The overseeing managers were Shigeru Miyamoto and Takashi Tezuka. Five divisions were located in the central Kyoto R&D building under the Software Development Department, while two divisions resided in the Tokyo offices under the Tokyo Software Development Department.	Nintendo EPD
Nintendo of America (NOA) Special-Projects	1990–1997	The first development branch at Nintendo of America. Nintendo wanted to deliver more software based at the U.S. market following the trails of the Sega Genesis marketing blitz. Nintendo of America appointed product analysts Jeff Hutt and Don James to head the division. The group initially concentrated on sports games, which led to the NES Play Action and Ken Griffey Jr. Presents Major League Baseball franchises.	—N/a
Nintendo Research & Engineering Department (Nintendo RED)	1996–2013	The original hardware development team responsible for all of Nintendo's portable and hand held systems. The manager Satoru Okada and most of the chief engineers originate from the old Nintendo R&D1 hardware division that created all the Game & Watch and hand held LCD cabinets. On 16 February 2013, Nintendo RED was combined with the Nintendo Integrated Research & Development (or IRD) division.	Nintendo IRD
Nintendo System Development (Nintendo SDD)	1997–2015	The Nintendo System Development Division, which used to be centered in peripheral and software development, was a hybrid development group with several distinct duties. The development team originated from Nintendo Research & Development 2 and was mainly responsible for ports and inhouse development for low profile hardware like the Pokémon Mini and the Super Famicom Satellaview service. The department handled most Nintendo Network programming and server maintenance inside Nintendo's in-house projects and throughout various other external Nintendo software, in cooperation with Nintendo Network Services. The department also cooperated in software development.	Nintendo PTD
Mobile21	1999-2002	A joint venture with Konami which concentrated on developing Game Boy Advance games with connectivity to mobile phones.	—N/a
Nintendo Integrated Research & Development (Nintendo IRD)	2000–2015	Nintendo Integrated Research & Development was Nintendo's hardware group that specialized in all engineering and technological aspects of Nintendo's home console and handheld development. The division also housed industrial designers who design peripherals such as the WaveBird, Wii Zapper, and Wii steering wheel. The group was originally known as Research and Development Department 3 (R&D3), with the same primary functions, with the exception that manager Genyo Takeda enjoyed moonlighting by developing console and arcade games. On 16 February 2013, Nintendo IRD combined with Nintendo Research & Engineering Department (or RED), the former hardware group that specialized in all engineering and technological aspects of Nintendo's handheld development.	Nintendo PTD
Nintendo Software Planning & Development (Nintendo SPD)	2004–2015	Nintendo Software Planning & Development was the development group that included several of the original development officers from the old software and hardware development sectors. The division was broken up into two departments; Software Planning & Development Department and Software Design & Development Department.	Nintendo EPD
Nintendo Network Service Database (NSD)	2009–2018	Nintendo Network Service Database Inc. (or NSD), formerly known as Wii no Ma, was originally created by Nintendo to provide digital entertainment as a service for Wii owners, with the company later renamed when its role changed. After the name change, Nintendo Network Services handled all Nintendo Network operations, including programming and server maintenance inside Nintendo's in-house projects through the Nintendo Network Business & Development division and throughout various other external online software infrastructures. Lastly, the company also cooperated in developing third party online infrastructures compatible with Nintendo consoles and Nintendo Network.	—N/a
Project Sora	2009–2012	The company was solely created to develop Kid Icarus: Uprising for the Nintendo 3DS. The president and director of the team, Masahiro Sakurai later joined forces with Bandai Namco Studios to create Super Smash Bros. for Nintendo 3DS and Wii U with Nintendo SPD.	—N/a
