= What's Cooking? =

What's Cooking? may refer to:

- What's Cooking? (film), a 2000 British/American comedy-drama film
- What's Cooking? (British TV series), a British lifestyle show
- What's Cooking? (Australian TV series), an Australian cooking television series

== See also ==
- What's Cooking? with Jamie Oliver, a cooking video game
