= Scribblenauts Showdown =

2018 party game

- Official cover art featuring Maxwell (left) and his sister, Lily (right)
- Developer: Shiver Entertainment
- Publisher: Warner Bros. Interactive Entertainment
- Series: Scribblenauts
- Platforms: Nintendo Switch; PlayStation 4 Xbox One
- Release: NA: March 6, 2018; PAL: March 9, 2018
- Genre: Party
- Modes: Single-player, multiplayer

Scribblenauts Showdown is a 2018 party video game developed by Shiver Entertainment and published by Warner Bros. Interactive Entertainment for the Nintendo Switch, PlayStation 4, and Xbox One. It is the sixth and most recent installment in the Scribblenauts series and the first to not be developed by 5th Cell. Showdown sees players playing minigames against other players or CPUs.

Showdown received mixed reviews from critics, with criticism for the game's "lack of imagination" and praise the game's sandbox mode for being more alike to prior Scribblenauts games.

== Gameplay ==
The player (left) competing against a CPU (right) in the Disc Dive minigame

Scribblenauts Showdown's main mode, Showdown, has players competing against opponents in different minigames. Prior to starting a minigame, players must select a noun that they will use to try to win the game. Before selecting a word, the game spins a wheel, which will decide what letter the player's words will start with. In Showdown mode, players play on different boards, akin to Nintendo's Mario Party series. The game also has a versus mode, which is similar to Showdown, except it's a 1v1 and doesn't take place on a board.

The game's sandbox mode is more like prior Scribblenauts installments and sees the player trying to solve NPC's issues by creating objects using a magical notebook. After solving an issue, players are rewarded with "Starites", which can be used to buy apparel in the customization menu. The sandbox mode has 8 different worlds and supports up to 2 players.

The game supports up to 4 players. Players can also face CPUs. Players can customize their characters in the "My Scribblenaut" menu. Players can unlock customization options for their avatars by spending Starites, which are unlocked after winning in the versus or Showdown mode, or by clearing missions in the sandbox mode.

== Development and release ==
Prior to its official reveal, Showdown was leaked by the Game Software Rating Regulations and Entertainment Software Rating Board, after the two boards publicly released the game's ratings. Scribblenauts Showdown was officially confirmed by Warner Bros. Interactive Entertainment in January 2018. Development for Showdown was headed by Shiver Entertainment, making it the first in the series not to be developed by the original creators, 5th Cell. Shiver Entertainment had also developed Scribblenauts Mega Pack (a video game compilation) as well as the Nintendo Switch versions of Mortal Kombat 11, Mortal Kombat 1 and Hogwarts Legacy.

Showdown was released on March 6, 2018, in North America for the Nintendo Switch, PlayStation 4, and Xbox One. The game was later released in Europe and Australia on March 9.

== Reception ==
Reception

Aggregate scores
Aggregator	Score		
Aggregator	NS	PS4	Xbox One
GameRankings	51% (Note: Based on 8 reviews)	67% (Note: Based on 5 reviews)	N/A
Metacritic	47/100 (Note: Based on 20 reviews)	64/100 (Note: Based on 17 reviews)	66/100 (Note: Based on 9 reviews)

Review scores
Publication	Score		
Publication	NS	PS4	Xbox One
Edge	3/10	N/A	N/A
Eurogamer	5/10	N/A	N/A
GamesMaster	N/A	64/100	N/A
IGN	N/A	7.3/10	6/10
Jeuxvideo.com	N/A	10/20	10/20
Nintendo Life	5/10	N/A	N/A
Nintendo World Report	4/10	N/A	N/A
PlayStation Official Magazine – UK	N/A	8/10	N/A
PC Games (DE)	8/10	8/10	8/10
Pocket Gamer	3/5	N/A	N/A
Push Square	N/A	6/10	N/A
The Sydney Morning Herald	4/10	N/A	N/A

Scribblenauts Showdown received "generally unfavorable reviews" from critics for the Nintendo Switch, and "mixed or average critic reviews" for the PlayStation 4 and Xbox One, according to review aggregator Metacritic. Critics criticized the game's "lack of imagination", with Edge thinking that Shiver Entertainment couldn't "conjure up a decent party game", despite the game's "great source material".

Marco Esposto of IGN Italy praised Showdown, calling it a "classic" party game. Esposto praised the game's avatar creation process for being "simple" and the game's "attractive" graphics, but criticized the low amount of minigames, citing that they quickly felt "repetitive". Ultimately, Esposto gave Showdown a score of 7.3/10.

The game's minigames received mixed reception among critics; Robert Handlery of GameSpot called them "boring", Gav Murphy of IGN Nordic stated that some of them are "awesome", and Stephen Tailby of Push Square called them "hit or miss".

The sandbox mode was praised by critics for being more alike prior Scribblenauts installments. Daan Koopman, reviewing Showdown for Nintendo World Report, wrote that the mode is "the biggest standout" in the game. Koopman praised the mode's animations and interactions for being "adorable" but criticized its controls for being "uncomfortable" and its missions for being "bland".
