= Shaberu! DS Oryōri Navi =

2006 video game

- Developer: indieszero
- Publisher: Nintendo
- Composer: Toshiyuki Sudo
- Platform: Nintendo DS
- Release: JP: July 20, 2006
- Genre: Edutainment
- Mode: Single-player

Shaberu! DS Oryōri Navi (しゃべる!DSお料理ナビ, Shaberu! Dīesu Oryōri Nabi; officially translated as Talking! DS Cooking Navigation) is a 2006 cooking simulation video game developed by indieszero and published by Nintendo for the Nintendo DS. It was released only in Japan.

== Brief information ==
The software contains numerous Japanese recipes with step by step instructions, and the user can use the Nintendo DS's microphone for voice-recognition commands like turning pages. All the instructions are read out loud, while some instructions are video recordings showing how to do some tasks like chopping. It is possible to choose recipes based on a number of calories, the ingredients the user has and so forth. The simulator also keeps in memory what dishes the player has already made. It also features a timer. As a bonus, the Game & Watch game, Chef, can also be played in this DS title.

== Reception ==
Shaberu! DS Oryōri Navi received an Excellence Prize for Entertainment at the 2006 Japan Media Arts Festival.

== Sequels and spin-offs ==
Shaberu! DS Oryōri Navi gave birth to numerous sequels. Nintendo developed a Japan only sequel Kenkou Ouen Recipe 1000: DS Kondate Zenshuu (健康応援レシピ1000 DS献立全集, lit. "Health Boost Recipe 1000: DS Complete Menu"), an internationally released sequel in the 2008 titled Cooking Guide: Can't Decide What to Eat?, and the North America-only 2010 release America's Test Kitchen: Let's Get Cooking, based on the PBS program, America's Test Kitchen after Cook's Illustrated magazine helped the publisher to write the game.

Koei released two Japan-only follow ups, including Shaberu! DS Oryōri Navi: Marugoto Teikoku Hotel (しゃべる!DSお料理ナビ まるごと帝国ホテル, It Talks! DS Cooking Navigator: The Marugoto Empire Hotel) and Kantan! Tanoshii! Okashi Navi DS (かんたん!たのしい!お菓子ナビDS, Simple! Fun! Pastry Navigator DS).

== Legacy ==
A musical remix based on this Nintendo DS title was used in Super Smash Bros. Brawl, where it was heard in the Kirby Final Smash update. This was only heard on the Japanese version of the official website, but the song was added to all versions of Super Smash Bros. Brawl as one of the songs for the PictoChat stage.
