= Pokémon Shuffle =

2015 free-to-play video game

- Developer: Genius Sonority
- Publishers: Nintendo 3DS: JP: The Pokémon Company; WW: Nintendo; iOS/Android; The Pokémon Company
- Director: Shunsuke Takagi
- Producers: Manabu Yamana; Hitoshi Yamagami; Naoto Ueoka
- Composer: Tsukasa Tawada
- Series: Pokémon
- Platforms: Nintendo 3DS, Android, iOS
- Release: Nintendo 3DS: WW: February 18, 2015; Android, iOS: JP: August 24, 2015; WW: August 31, 2015
- Genre: Puzzle
- Mode: Single-player

Pokémon Shuffle (Note: Japanese: ポケとる, Hepburn: Pokétoru) is a 2015 puzzle game developed by Genius Sonority and published by Nintendo and The Pokémon Company. The game, which is a spin-off of the Pokémon series and is similar in gameplay to Pokémon Battle Trozei (2014), was released worldwide on the Nintendo eShop for the Nintendo 3DS on February 18, 2015. Pokémon Shuffle Mobile, a version for Android and iOS devices, was released in August 2015.

== Gameplay ==
A stage in Pokémon Shuffle, where the player battles a Mudkip

Pokémon Shuffle, similar to Pokémon Battle Trozei, is a puzzle game in which players fight against various Pokémon by matching three or more of the same Pokémon from the Kanto, Johto, Hoenn, Sinnoh, Unova, Kalos and Alola regions on their bottom of their screen. Players accomplish this by swapping around Pokémon on the bottom of their screen. Players can take up to four support Pokémon with them, some of which can deal additional damage depending on their type (e.g. matching water-type Pokémon causes extra damage to fire-based opponents). Players progress through each stage by defeating the opposing pokemon within a set number of moves, after which the player receives in-game coins and their Pokémon gain experience. Upon clearing a stage, players will have a chance to catch the Pokémon; the quicker the player defeats a Pokémon, the higher probability they have of catching it. If the player fails to catch it with their first Pokéball, they can spend coins to use Great Balls with a doubled chance of success, or retry the stage at a later date. Defeating Pokémon trainers earns Mega Stones, which allow certain Pokémon (if they have been successfully caught) to undergo Mega Evolution once a player has matched enough of them during a stage, granting bonus effects when matched. Players can also unlock Expert levels, which require the player to defeat a Pokémon within a time limit using unlimited moves.

The game follows a freemium format in which the player requires hearts to attempt each stage, with the player able to recover up to five hearts by waiting a certain amount of time. Players can also use coins to purchase power-ups, such as extra moves, prior to entering a stage. Extra hearts and coins can be purchased with jewels, which are either earned by defeating trainers or purchased using Nintendo eShop funds. The game supports internet connectivity which offers bonus items and special limited-time stages to those who check in, as well as StreetPass functionality.

== Release ==
On January 14, 2015, Pokémon Shuffle was announced by Nintendo as a free-to-play game for the Nintendo 3DS. The game was developed by Japanese studio Genius Sonority. The title was released on February 18, 2015, via download through the Nintendo eShop. In June 2015, a mobile version of the game was announced for Android and iOS. It released in Japan on August 24, 2015, and other territories on August 31, 2015. Post-release, the game has been supported with updates adding new stages and obtainable Pokémon.

In July 2018, the last Pokémon, Marshadow, was released. Genius Sonority has no plans to add more content.

As of April 8, 2024, following the shutdown of the 3DS and WiiU's online servers, it is no longer possible for 3DS players to purchase Hearts and Coins from the shop, buy Jewels, receive daily bonuses, or participate in ranked cups. Although, items can still be received through Special Stages or any unplayed Main Stages.

== Reception ==
Reception

Aggregate score
Aggregator	Score
Metacritic	3DS: 56/100 iOS: 62/100

Review scores
Publication	Score
Destructoid	3.5/10
GameRevolution	3.5/5
Nintendo Life	7/10
Hardcore Gamer	3.5/5

Pokémon Shuffle received mixed reviews from the media, scoring 56/100 on Metacritic.

Chris Carter from Destructoid was critical of the game, rating it 3.5/10. In particular he criticized the Hearts system, which requires 30 minutes for a single heart to regenerate. He also criticized the microtransactions, saying, "Anything truly enjoyable about the game is ruined by the microtransactions." Jacob Whritenour of Hardcore Gamer gave the game a more mixed review, scoring it a 3.5 out of 5 and saying "It's fun and challenging enough to keep Pokémon and puzzle fans entertained," while also criticizing the microtransactions. Morgan Sleeper of Nintendo Life was relatively praising of the game, stating it as "a fantastic match-three puzzle game marred by an uncharacteristically sleazy suite of microtransactions", explaining that "they're simply not worth buying". He did, however, praise the strategy element of the game.

As of July 2017, Pokémon Shuffle has been downloaded 6.5 million times.
