= The Denpa Men: They Came By Wave =

2012 video game

- Developer: Genius Sonority
- Publisher: Genius Sonority
- Composers: Hitoshi Sakimoto; Azusa Chiba; Yoshimi Kudo; Mitsuhiro Kaneda; Kimihiro Abe; Masaharu Iwata
- Platform: Nintendo 3DS
- Release: JP: February 8, 2012; NA: September 27, 2012; PAL: December 6, 2012
- Genre: Role-playing
- Mode: Single-player

The Denpa Men: They Came By Wave (Note: Japanese: 電波人間のRPG, Hepburn: Denpa Ningen no RPG) is a 2012 augmented reality role-playing video game developed and published by Genius Sonority for the Nintendo 3DS. It was released on the Nintendo eShop in Japan on February 8, 2012, in North America on September 27, 2012, and in Europe and Australia on December 6, 2012.

== Gameplay ==
In The Denpa Men, the player captures Denpa Men to form a party to explore dungeons. Using the Nintendo 3DS's camera, Denpa Men will appear in the player's surroundings when near a Wi-Fi signal or scanning a QR code. Denpa Men differ by name, color, appearance, and abilities.

Combat is not random and follows the traditional role-playing formula with an auto-battle option. Other common role-playing elements that appear in the game are treasure chests, item shops, and non-player characters.

If a dungeon is left with downed allies, every Denpa Man that was downed will leave the party. By purchasing offerings from the in-game shop, Denpa Men can be revived via the spirit shrine, albeit only if they were caught via the antenna tower.

== Setting ==
The Denpa Men live on a small island which has a house, a shrine so that if Denpa Men die, players can retrieve them, a shop, and a tower that has an antenna on it that allows the player to catch Denpa Men called Antenna Tower. There is also a dock with a boat that takes players to many different islands in the game. Players can soon unlock a museum of Denpa Men, a PC for QR Code scanning, and an item shop.

== Reception ==
The Denpa Men was given a rating of 7.5 on Metacritic. Reviewers praised the game for its quirkiness and difficulty.

== Sequels ==
A sequel named The Denpa Men 2: Beyond the Waves was released in Japan and in the West. The title features improved gameplay, more dungeons, and other additions. A third game, The Denpa Men 3: The Rise of Digitoll, was released in Japan on August 7, 2013, in North America, Europe and Australia on May 8, 2014.

On July 2, 2014, it was announced that a spin-off title, Denpa Men's RPG FREE! (Japanese: 電波人間のRPG FREE!, Hepburn: Denpa Ningen no RPG FREE!) would be a free-to-play game. It was released on the Nintendo 3DS exclusively for Japan on July 23, 2014. Another spin-off title, New Denpa Men's RPG (Japanese: New 電波人間のRPG, Hepburn: New Denpa Ningen no RPG) was released as a Japan-exclusive mobile game in 2017, but shut down in May 2019.

Due to the closure of the Nintendo 3DS eShop on March 27, 2023, the 3DS games, including the original trilogy and "FREE!" are no longer purchasable (as with the rest of the software available on the digital storefront), though it remains available to redownload if already owned before the closure along with software updates for some time.

In June 2024, an updated version based on Denpa Men's RPG FREE! and New Denpa Men's RPG titled The New Denpa Men (Japanese: New 電波人間のRPG FREE!, Hepburn: New Denpa Ningen no RPG FREE!) was announced and released worldwide for the Nintendo Switch on July 22, 2024. On October 4, 2026, Genius Sonority announced that The New Denpa Men will end services on December 6.
