= Sushi Striker: The Way of Sushido =

2018 video game

- Icon artwork
- Developer: indieszero
- Publisher: Nintendo
- Directors: Kaori Ando; Anna Haparchucchi
- Producers: Hitoshi Yamagami; Masanobu Suzui
- Programmers: Yuuka Terauchi; Kazuyuki Miyata
- Artists: Ayako Okubo; Takayasu Morisawa
- Writer: Norihito Nakayashiki
- Composer: Shunsuke Tsuchiya
- Platforms: Nintendo 3DS; Nintendo Switch
- Release: June 8, 2018
- Genres: Action, puzzle
- Modes: Single-player, multiplayer

Sushi Striker: The Way of Sushido (Note: Known in Japan as Super Rotating Sushi Striker - The Way of Sushido (Japanese: 超回転 寿司ストライカー The Way of Sushido, Hepburn: Chō kaiten sushi sutoraikā)) is an action-puzzle video game developed by indieszero and published by Nintendo. The game was released worldwide for the Nintendo 3DS and Nintendo Switch on June 8, 2018. Sushi Striker takes place in a world where sushi has been made forbidden by its ruling empire. The protagonist, Musashi, attempts to revert this ban on sushi. The game consists of one-on-one battles with CPU-controlled opponents, where the player must match sushi plates of the same color on a series of conveyor belts to cause damage to the opponent.

Sushi Striker received generally positive reviews from critics who praised its gameplay, anime-inspired art style, and story, but criticized the game length and controls.

== Gameplay ==
Musashi battling an opponent

Sushi Striker: The Way of Sushido is a game where the player battles against opponents with sushi in order to defeat them. In battle, both the player and the opponent face each other, with conveyor belts of sushi, resembling sushi trains, between them. The player must match as many sushi plates of the same color as possible in order to gather them. Musashi will eat the sushi off the plates, and the plates will attack the opponent, causing their health to decrease. This is also how the opponent attacks. The player and the opponent have three conveyor belts each to match sushi on, as well as one conveyor between them, for both to use. The game also offers online multiplayer.

== Plot ==
The game takes place in a world without fish, where the Republic and the Empire have long battled over control of sushi in a war known as the Sushi Struggles. In this world, sushi is created by mysterious creatures known as "sushi sprites", and the people who fight alongside them (by throwing the plates used to serve the sushi) are known as "sushi strikers". Following the defeat of the Republic, the Empire forbids the consumption of sushi within the borders of the Republic.

The player plays as Musashi (whose gender is set by the player), an orphan growing up in the Republic. While attempting to gather food for hungry children in the orphanage where they grew up, Musashi comes across a sushi striker named Franklin and his partner sprite, Ara-o. Franklin offers Musashi some sushi, and after some hesitance due to Musashi losing their father in the Sushi Struggles, Musashi tries it out. Thrilled by its taste, Musashi resolves to spread the word of sushi to everyone, and asks Franklin to feed the orphanage's children as a first step. Before they can return home, however, Franklin and Ara-o are captured by Imperial general Kodiak and taken for interrogation.

Alone and hungry once more, Musashi hears a distant voice leading them to a nearby shrine. The voice encourages Musashi to eat the sushi that the shrine makes. After doing so, the voice reveals itself to be Jinrai, a sushi sprite in hiding who is highly sought after by the Empire. By accepting the sushi, Musashi unknowingly pledges with Jinrai, and the two agree to band together in order to rescue Franklin and tell everyone possible about sushi.

Along the way, Musashi encounters the Sushi Liberation Front (known as the SLF), a resistance opposing the Empire. Musashi agrees to join the SLF, and together they push out Kodiak's forces from their territory. Pressing into Imperial territory, they reach a stronghold that the Empire's top general, Tiburon, leads. As Musashi faces Tiburon, however, Tiburon uses the technique known as Sushido to freeze Musashi in place. While Musashi is frozen, Tiburon reveals that he is Musashi's father and reveals he defected from the SLF. Once he leaves, Musashi confronts Masa, the leader of the SLF, and is incensed to learn that the soldiers of the SLF are trained to discard the rice and eat only the tastiest part of sushi to improve their abilities. Outraged, Musashi challenges and defeats Masa to claim leadership of the SLF, declaring that sushi must be consumed in its entirety.

Soon after, Musashi learns where Franklin is being kept prisoner and is able to rescue him, but Franklin had been tortured via being force-fed endless wasabi. Weakened and unable to continue sushi striking, Ara-o requests to pledge with Musashi to carry on Franklin's dream. When Musashi accepts, they master their own form of Sushido, which also allows Jinrai to ascend into his final and strongest form.

The SLF breaches the heart of Imperial territory, and Musashi defeats Tiburon in combat. Tiburon is forced to admit defeat, and rejoins the SLF under his old name Jubay. He tries to convince child emperor Octavius to surrender peacefully, however Octavius has been traumatized by the fact that he had long been denied sushi by his own father, and goes insane, leading to a climactic battle. After a long struggle, the emperor is defeated, and despite Musashi attempting to make peace by sharing a plate of sushi with him, the emperor chooses to depart to, according to Jinrai, "the place where sushi comes from".

With the emperor defeated, the land is at peace once more, and the people of the land, in both the Empire and the Republic, are free to enjoy sushi. The story ends with Musashi and Jubay living out their lives together in peace, hoping that some day, Musashi's mother will return, so they can become a family once more.

== Development and release ==
Development began when Nintendo producer, Hitoshi Yamagami, asked Tokyo Mirage Sessions ♯FE director, Kaori Ando, for ideas on new Nintendo 3DS and Nintendo Switch software, Ando pitched an idea for a game about eating sushi. Although confused by the concept, he and the team eventually worked to flesh out the concept, conceiving the characters, the general premise for the game, as well as writing the story. Nintendo then shopped the project around to four potential co-development partners. indieszero, who had previously worked with Nintendo on NES Remix and Electroplankton, was the last company approached, and they suggested to make it a puzzle game. The puzzle game indeszero pitched was different from the final product. Nintendo and indieszero then worked to refine and finalize the core mechanics for the game.

Sushi Striker: The Way of Sushido was initially announced at E3 2017 as a Nintendo 3DS exclusive title. The game was later featured in a Nintendo Direct presentation held in March 2018, with the announcement of a Nintendo Switch version as well as online multiplayer. The game was released worldwide on June 8.

== Reception ==
Reception

Aggregate score
Aggregator	Score
Metacritic	76/100

Review scores
Publication	Score
Destructoid	6.5/10
Game Informer	7.75/10
GameSpot	7/10
Nintendo Life	8/10
Nintendo World Report	9.5/10
Shacknews	8/10

Sushi Striker: The Way of Sushido received "generally favorable reviews" according to the review aggregator Metacritic. Critics praised the general puzzle gameplay of the levels, but criticized the lengthy campaign and the awkward controls.

Neal Ronaghan of Nintendo World Report praised the feel of the sushi-combining mechanics saying that "it became second nature to zoom around the board". Ryan Craddock of Nintendo Life appreciated the game's anime aesthetic and how the abilities of each of the Sushi Sprites allowed the player to change their playstyle. Kyle Hilliard, writing for Game Informer, enjoyed the combos that the game allowed the player to create, although he criticized the controls as not being accurate enough, whether using the touch screen or the cursor. Kevin Knezevic of GameSpot enjoyed the game's story, calling it absurd but charming.

=== Sales ===
Within its first week, the game sold 5,325 copies for the Nintendo Switch and 2,392 copies for the Nintendo 3DS in Japan.
