= Nintendo World Championships: NES Edition =

2024 video game

- Cover art
- Developers: Nintendo EPD indieszero
- Publisher: Nintendo
- Director: Hirotaka Watanabe
- Producers: Kouichi Kawamoto; Takayuki Shimamura
- Composer: Masaru Tajima
- Platform: Nintendo Switch
- Release: WW: July 18, 2024
- Genres: Action, party, platformer, racing
- Modes: Single-player, multiplayer

Nintendo World Championships: NES Edition (Note: Nintendo World Championships: Famicom Sekai Taikai (Japanese: Nintendo World Championships ファミコン世界大会, Hepburn: Nintendō Wārudo Chanpionshippusu: Famikon Sekai Taikai)) is a 2024 video game developed by Nintendo and indieszero and published by Nintendo for the Nintendo Switch system. It is based on the Nintendo World Championships esports competition. The game was released on July 18, 2024, digitally on the Nintendo eShop and as a physical deluxe edition in stores.

== Gameplay ==
Nintendo World Championships: NES Edition focuses on players speedrunning certain objectives, known as Challenges, in NES-era Nintendo video games, aiming to complete these tasks as fast as possible. Players are given specific grades for completing these Challenges based on how fast they completed them and are given coins to spend on unlocking new Challenges. Unlike the actual Nintendo World Championships in 1990 or the Nintendo World Championships Remix game mode within NES Remix, there is no mode within NES Edition that uses a points system over three games.

=== Modes ===
- Speedrun Mode - Players have to speedrun specific Challenges as fast as possible on their own. Coins earned in the game can be used to unlock new Challenges to complete in this mode.
- World Championships - Players speedrun five different Challenges consecutively, with the time spent on them being tallied and placed onto an online leaderboard. The World Championships mode consists of weekly Competitions, with the list of Challenges updated each week.
- Survival Mode - In this battle royale style mode, the player faces the ghosts of players from all over the world in three rounds. At the end of each round, half of the players are eliminated. To qualify, the player must place in the top half of the leaderboard.
- Party Mode - Up to eight players in local multiplayer compete to see who can complete Challenges the fastest. Each player is given points after each Challenge (known in the mode as a Match) that are accumulated to determine a winner.

== Games ==
The following games are featured in this game:

- Balloon Fight
- Donkey Kong
- Excitebike
- Ice Climber
- Kid Icarus
- Kirby's Adventure
- Metroid
- Super Mario Bros.
- Super Mario Bros. 2
- Super Mario Bros. 3
- Super Mario Bros.: The Lost Levels
- The Legend of Zelda
- Zelda II: The Adventure of Link

== Development and release ==
The game was initially accidentally leaked early by the ESRB on May 3, 2024. It was officially announced on May 9, 2024, and was released on July 18, 2024.

== Reception ==
Reception

Aggregate scores
Aggregator	Score
Metacritic	73/100 (Note: Score based on 68 reviews)
OpenCritic	54% recommend (Note: Score based on 68 reviews)

Review scores
Publication	Score
Famitsu	32/40
Game Informer	7.75/10
Shacknews	8/10

Nintendo World Championships: NES Edition received "mixed or average" reviews from critics, according to the review aggregation website Metacritic. Fellow review aggregator OpenCritic assessed that the game received fair approval, being recommended by 55% of critics. In Japan, four critics from Famitsu gave the game a total score of 32 out of 40, with each critic awarding the game an 8 out of 10.

=== Sales ===
Nintendo World Championships: NES Edition debuted at No.3 on the Famitsu chart during the opening week in Japan, selling 27,391 retail copies, becoming the second-best selling new release of the week, behind Powerful Pro Baseball 2024-2025.

== See also ==
- NES Remix, a video game series on Nintendo 3DS and Wii U with a similar play style
