= DualPenSports =

2011 video game

- Developer: indieszero
- Publisher: Namco Bandai Games
- Platform: Nintendo 3DS
- Release: JP: June 2, 2011; NA: June 21, 2011; EU: September 2, 2011; AU: September 22, 2011
- Genre: Sports
- Modes: Single-player, multiplayer

DualPenSports, known as Touch! Double Pen Sports (タッチ！ダブルペンスポーツ) in Japan, is a 2011 sports video game developed by indieszero and published by Namco Bandai Games for the Nintendo 3DS. It was released under the Bandai label. The game gets its name from the fact that two special sports styluses are used to play the game. The sports are soccer, baseball, boxing, basketball, paragliding, archery and skiing. There are also tap exercises to help players get used to playing the game with two styluses rather than one.

== Reception ==
Reception

Aggregate score
Aggregator	Score
Metacritic	58/100

Review scores
Publication	Score
GameRevolution	1/10
Nintendo Life	4/10
Pocket Gamer	3/5
Yahoo!	4/10

DualPenSports received mixed reviews from critics. On Metacritic, the game holds a score of 58/100 based on 11 reviews.

GameRevolution's Kevin Schaller rated the game a 1/10 while criticizing the graphics, character customization and the gameplay for the sports lacking in variety. Zach Kaplan of Nintendo Life described the game's sports styluses as being an "ineffective gimmick" that bring down the entire game while scoring it 4 out of 10 stars. Mike Rose of Pocket Gamer, scoring the game 3 out of 5 stars, recommended the game for younger children while praising its presentation but described the minigames as being "simple and lifeless".
