= Disaster: Day of Crisis =

2008 video game

- European box art
- Developer: Monolith Soft
- Publisher: Nintendo
- Directors: Keiichi Ono; Azusa Tajima; Genki Yokota
- Producers: Tadashi Nomura; Hitoshi Yamagami
- Writer: Keiichi Ono
- Composer: Yoshihiro Ike
- Platform: Wii
- Release: JP: September 25, 2008; EU: October 24, 2008; AU: November 13, 2008
- Genres: Action-adventure, survival, light gun shooter
- Mode: Single-player

Disaster: Day of Crisis (Note: Japanese: ディザスター デイ オブ クライシス, Hepburn: Dizasutā Dei obu Kuraishisu) is a 2008 action-adventure light gun shooter developed by Monolith Soft and published by Nintendo for the Wii. In it, the player must survive various natural disasters while battling terrorists and rescuing civilians. According to Nintendo, the game features "cutting-edge physics and gripping visuals" to recreate the sheer terror of major catastrophes.

== Gameplay ==
In Disaster, players control Raymond "Ray" Bryce from a third-person point of view during cinematic adventure sections, taking on puzzles and navigating hazards that can hurt or kill him. In these sections, several quick time events and minigames are based around the motion controls of the Remote and Nunchuk. For example, the player can perform actions such as pressing buttons in rhythm to perform CPR, moving heavy objects and running from flood waters and lava flows by quickly moving the Wii Remote and Nunchuk, and driving a car by holding the Wii Remote on its side and tilting it left or right. The player also encounters a mysterious man with a fedora and cane who offers unique shooting range tickets.

Disaster's core combat is primarily played out as a rail shooter, utilizing the Wii Remote's pointer function to target enemies. The player can hold up to three weapons of their choice, along with one mandatory pistol with unlimited ammo cache; they can swap freely between weapons using the Direction Pad. Shooting Range tickets can also grant unique weapons to Raymond if their challenge criteria are met. During the combat sequences, the player can duck, take cover if available, and shoot more accurately by using Zoom Mode to concentrate for double damage. Taking cover makes Raymond invulnerable to damage at the cost of being unable to shoot, and has no general penalty outside of losing stamina in drawn-out battles. Taking too long without proper self care may result in HP consumption in place of Stamina Consumption until Raymond is fed properly.

Players must maintain Raymond's survival stats, such as stamina, heartrate and lung clarity, which are depleted by strenuous activities or exposure to smoke and poisonous fumes. To keep Raymond healthy, food and snacks, which replenish stamina, and taking in rhythmic, well-timed breaths of fresh air are essential for survival. Rescuing survivors involves bringing them to safety or completing a first aid minigame before their stamina meter depletes and they die. Successfully rescuing enough survivors will extend Raymond's maximum health by one unit.

During the game, players can improve Raymond's skills, including his strength, accuracy with firearms, and mental concentration, by collecting "Survival Points" (SP) earned by rescuing civilians, while "Battle Points" (BP) earned from killing SURGE members can be used to purchase and upgrade Raymond's weapons and equipment.

The game has 23 stages, each of which can be replayed to obtain a higher score. The game also includes a shooting range, "stamina challenges", unlockable weapons and costumes, and a more difficult "Real Disaster Mode".

== Plot ==
Raymond "Ray" Bryce, a Gulf War Marine and International Rescue Team (IRT) member, and his partner, Steve Hewitt, embark on a rescue mission near the dormant South American volcano, Mt. Aguilas. When the volcano erupts unexpectedly, Steve sacrifices himself to save Ray, entrusting him with an antique compass for his sister Lisa.

A year later, a guilt-stricken Ray has left the IRT and joined the Crisis Management Division (CMD) based in Blue Ridge City. He is recruited by FBI Special Agent Olson to collaborate with the Blue Ridge City Special Response Team (SRT) as a liaison officer during a raid on an abandoned office building held by SURGE, a Marine special forces group led by Colonel Haynes. SURGE has taken seismologist Dr. Davis and his assistant, Lisa Hewitt, hostage there, demanding compensation from sitting US president Lewis for their fallen comrades, threatening to detonate their stolen nuclear warheads as retaliation of the previous administration's support of the despotic South American government SURGE was seeking to overthrow. Determined to atone for Steve's death, Ray joins the SRT raid and finds Davis and Lisa, but is engaged in a firefight with Gordon, SURGE's third-in-command, while an earthquake rattles the city. Gordon and his mercenaries fled with Davis and Lisa in tow. Ray also evacuates, briefly eluding SURGE's forces in a high-speed chase.

Ray aids Blue Ridge Mayor Townsend in saving a trapped citizen from debris, then heads to an evacuation zone set up at West Park, only to find it engulfed in flames and threatened by a fire twister approaching them. Ray, with coordination from the city's residents, successfully creates an escape route, although Townsend is presumed dead. After fleeing the park, Ray confronts Gordon's mercenary unit on a bridge, successfully incapacitating the latter. He seizes the radio and a nuclear detonator and leaves Gordon for dead as a megatsunami engulfs the area. Ray outruns the tsunami, but is chased by SURGE pilot Gregory. They both survive a second tsunami, with Ray overpowering Gregory before being swept away and losing consciousness. He later awakens on a mountainside, learning that Townsend has survived.

Following Haynes' instructions from the stolen radio, Ray heads to SURGE's new base at Mt. Rosalia's old geothermal plant to trade the detonator for Lisa's life. However, their deal is disrupted by Mt. Rosalia's eruption, and Ray is caught in the pyroclastic flow, and was suffocated by the volcanic ash, before he was himself rescued by young girl named Iris. He and Iris make a perilous descent down the mountain before being able to contact Olson via satellite phone. Ray parts ways with Iris as he tracks down SURGE in Bainesville, a town submerged by an approaching hurricane. Ray commandeers a boat to the church where SURGE's new hideout is located; Davis and Lisa make an unsuccessful attempt to escape the church, ending with the former's death.

Outside the church, Ray manages to fend off Banks, a mercenary hired by SURGE, but is then captured and imprisoned in the basement. Haynes, feeling morally conflicted and reminded of his duty to protect his country, and persuaded by Ray's plea to save a pair of stranded children, decides against detonating the nuclear device in Miami. He eliminates Banks and several other mercenaries before he is subsequently gunned down by Major Evans, the second-in-command of SURGE, and is presumed dead. After Ray's escape, Evans recaptures Lisa and flees to Port Alex. Ray follows them amidst a hurricane but is overpowered. Olson's reinforcements arrive, forcing SURGE to withdraw to a ferry.

Ray boards the ferry as it leaves, confronting Major Evans. Refusing to back down, Evans activates the nuclear warhead and discards the detonator into the ocean. However, Haynes, who is revealed to be alive, kills Evans. Ray, with Haynes' help, locates and deactivates the warhead before it detonates. As the ferry takes on water, Ray and Lisa make their escape on a lifeboat, while Haynes, accepting responsibility for his actions, remains aboard and perishes. Ray and Lisa are later rescued by Olson.

In a post-credits scene, Iris reunites with her parents, and Townsend and Lewis convene at the stadium to announce plans to rebuild Blue Ridge City in the wake of these disasters. Ray comes to terms with Steve's passing and rejoins the IRT. He and Lisa visit Steve's grave to seek guidance before leaving, while discussing that President Lewis has already paid compensation to families of dead SURGE members. In an alternate ending, a month later, President Lewis is informed of an asteroid approaching Earth, and Ray is sent to space to shoot it down.

== Development ==
Disaster: Day of Crisis was Monolith Soft's first game to be developed for the Wii, conceived after the developers decided to make a brand new game that plays to the strengths of the platform instead of porting the GameCube game Baten Kaitos Origins to it.

== Release ==
Although initially there was little information about the game after its debut E3 2006 announcement, an interview with then-Nintendo of America marketing director Beth Llewelyn during E3 2007 revealed that Disaster was still in development.

The April 2008 issue of the Japanese video game magazine Famitsu later revealed the release date for Japan was to be July 3, 2008, but on May 17, 2008, Monolith announced that the release date for Disaster had been "postponed indefinitely" to "increase the quality of the finished product". However, on August 13, 2008, the website of the Australian Office of Film and Literature Classification listed the game with an M rating, suggesting it was nearing completion. Nintendo also stated that the game was "still in development" on August 19, 2008.

Japanese TV spots later confirmed a release date of September 25, 2008 in Japan. The European Nintendo website also confirmed a European release for October 24, 2008.

The game's North American release was cancelled due to poor sales outside the country and the fact that Reggie Fils-Aimé, then-president of Nintendo America, hated the game, calling it laughable and overpriced.

== Reception ==
Reception

Aggregate score
Aggregator	Score
Metacritic	69/100

Review scores
Publication	Score
Eurogamer	6/10
Famitsu	34/40
GamesMaster	73%
GameSpot	5.5/10
IGN	8/10
NGamer	73%
Nintendo Life	8/10
Official Nintendo Magazine	82%
PALGN	7.5/10
VideoGamer.com	5/10

Disaster: Day of Crisis received "average" reviews according to the review aggregation website Metacritic. Famitsu gave Disaster a score of 34 out of 40. Official Nintendo Magazine praised the presentation and the mix of gameplay styles; though they felt the enemy AI was "woeful", the game was described as "a really enjoyable arcade-style experience." Siliconera likened it to "a vapid, but fun to watch summer action movie". IGN claimed Disaster delivers fun in "huge, preposterous spades", and believed the mix of genres and gameplay mechanics to be "relentlessly unpredictable and gloriously compulsive". However, they also found problems with the game's pacing, increasingly repetitive combat and adventuring, and unbalanced driving sections, and felt that some players will be put off by the number of "abstract game mechanics wrestled into a single plot-driven narrative". Cubed³ called Disaster "completely mesmerising", despite an inconsistent visual quality and difficulty level, praising the intentionally cheesy dialogue, high level of interactivity and "rousing" soundtrack. N-Europe said that while the game can be "great fun" and "brilliantly atmospheric", it is held back by poor graphics and lacklustre physics, especially in the driving segments.

In contrast, GameSpot called the game "unfocused and scatterbrained", with "lackluster" graphics and sound. Eurogamer also found fault with the unfocused and confusing mix of genres and had control issues with the driving and adventuring sections, though they called the shooter segments "lots of fun" and the plot entertaining and "unwittingly hilarious beyond belief".

In its first week of sales in Japan, Disaster sold more than 13,000 copies. After its first month, it had sold 21,464 copies in Japan.
