= Pokémon Trozei! =

2005 puzzle video game

- North American box art
- Developer: Genius Sonority
- Publishers: JP: The Pokémon Company; WW: Nintendo
- Director: Manabu Yamana
- Producers: Kunimi Kawamura; Hitoshi Yamagami
- Artist: James Turner
- Composer: Tsukasa Tawada
- Series: Pokémon
- Platform: Nintendo DS
- Release: JP: October 20, 2005; NA: March 6, 2006; AU: April 28, 2006; EU: May 5, 2006; KO: May 17, 2007
- Genre: Puzzle
- Modes: Single-player, multiplayer

Pokémon Trozei! (Note: Japanese: ポケモントローゼ, Hepburn: Pokemon Torōze) (Note: Released as Pokémon Link! in Europe) is a 2005 puzzle game developed by Genius Sonority and published by The Pokémon Company and Nintendo for the Nintendo DS. It was released in Japan on October 20, 2005, in North America on March 6, 2006, in Australia on April 28, 2006, and in Europe on May 5, 2006. Trozei is a Romanization of its Japanese title Torōze, meaning "Let's get/take (Pokemon)".

The game received mostly positive reviews from critics. A sequel, Pokémon Battle Trozei, released in 2014 for the Nintendo 3DS.

== Gameplay ==
Pokémon Trozei! has gameplay similar to both Tetris and Yoshi's Cookie. The blocks are symbols shaped like various Pokémon. These blocks fall onto both screens; however, only the blocks on the bottom screen can be moved and matched. The player can move the blocks to the left and right, and the Pokémon that was moved off the edge of the screen returns to the opposite side of the screen. The blocks can also be moved downward, and the blocks on the bottom will fall to the top of the column. The blocks can be moved upwards, but will immediately fall back down if a match is not made. If four of the same Pokémon are in a row, a match is made and those Pokémon will disappear.

After a match of four is created, a Trozei Chance (or Link Chance) Icon will come up. When that happens, match-ups of three Pokémon are allowed for a short amount of time, normally two seconds. If a match of three is made during that time, match-ups of two Pokémon are allowed as well for as long as the player continues to make links every two seconds.

The Pokémon Ditto will also commonly appear as a block, and the player can use it as a "wild card" and match it with any other Pokémon, or even with multiple types simultaneously. Lining up Jammer balls (rocks) with Ditto is the only way to get rid of them during boss stages. While Ditto appears randomly during levels, one also drops when the player links up more Pokémon than needed (e.g. 5 instead of 4) in general play.

=== Phobos Battalion ===
The Phobos Battalion is the new enemy of this game. They have stolen countless Poké Balls in order to power up a secret weapon. Unlike most Pokémon villains, there are only generals in the game, no underlings. They have many secret storages and huge storage (that contain many more Pokémon than the secret storages) and six Phobos Mobiles, each containing a General that the player must defeat in order to move on.

The region Pokémon Trozei! takes place in is unknown.

This game features Pokémon from Kanto, Johto and Hoenn.

Lucy Fleetfoot is working under Professor P, who is the top agent of SOL (the Secret Operation League). SOL is represented by a Solrock, while the Phobos Battalion is represented by a Lunatone.

There are four different Styles of stages in the Adventure mode: Research, Storage, Phobos Mobiles, and Mr. Who's Den.

The first of these, Research, is a training mode designed to show the player the basic method of play, and to show them helpful tricks.

Players set out with two partners, Aipom and Manectric, and are equipped with the Trozei Beamer invented by Prof. P. After the player sneaks into the enemy's fortress, they seek out the Pokéballs and scans them with x-rays from their Beamer. The Beamer will transfer 4 (or 2 and 3 later) identical Pokémon back to Prof. P at SOL each time, and this explains the gameplay of lining up the Pokémon icons in the game fields.

The Storage levels, which come in two varieties (Secret Storage and Huge Storage), are "normal" levels where the goal is to link up the required number of Pokémon. The two types of Storage levels differ only in the number of Pokémon that must be linked.

The Phobos Mobiles are the "boss fights" where the player has to beat the Generals of the Phobos Battalion at games of Trozei. The Phobos Mobiles are the Phobos Train, the Phobos Jet, the Phobos Drill, the Phobos Sub and the Phobos Walker. During these games, the "opponent" does a variety of things. A plain white ball or rock, known as a Jammer Ball, can be inserted as a tile, which does not match with any Pokémon except Ditto. The screen can lose its color, so only the silhouettes of the Pokémon can be seen until a link is made. If the player is very close to winning (less than 10), the "opponent" can add 50 to the number of Pokémon left needed to be linked.

Mr. Who's Den is a sort of "bonus level" where rare Pokémon appear more often, and the playfield is also two columns wider than normal. The player must pay a Prize Coin to play there, and games are timed at two minutes (plus allowing the current Trozei Chance to end) rather than ending after a certain number of Pokémon have been cleared.

Once the original adventure mode is completed, the Trozei Hard Adventure can be accessed.

=== Endless Mode ===
As the name suggests, this mode continues until the play area is completely filled with pieces. It is divided into many levels. The player can start on any level which is a multiple of 5 that they have cleared already, and before reaching level 25, they can start from 1, 5, 10, 15 or 20. The maximum level is greater than 145 and likely goes well beyond that, if not without a final level at all (hence the name "Endless Mode"). The player completes a level when they clear the necessary amount of Pokémon. When the level changes, the common and rare Pokémon also change.

=== Forever Mode ===
This mode is similar to Endless. However, the player must Trozei five Pokémon first, then four, etc. The Pokémon fall faster than in Endless and the setup is exactly the same as Mr. Who's den; it has the exact layout of the Den but the same rules as Endless. Forever mode is intended to be a harder challenge than Endless mode due to these small changes, and it is likely that it too never ends, regardless of how many levels the players completes (hence being given the name "Forever Mode").

=== Pokédex ===
Pokémon Trozei! has a side mission of completing the National Dex. To get a Pokémon's entry, the player must Trozei a Pokémon in any mode.

== Sequel ==
During the Nintendo Direct on February 13, 2014, Nintendo announced the sequel to Pokémon Trozei! that would be released exclusively on the Nintendo 3DS eShop.

The game (titled Pokémon Battle Trozei in North America and Pokémon Link Battle in Europe) was released in March 2014 for Japan, Europe and North America.

== Reception ==
Reception

Aggregate score
Aggregator	Score
Metacritic	74/100

Review scores
Publication	Score
Game Informer	8.25/10
GameSpot	7.1/10
GameSpy	3.5/5
GamesRadar+	3.5/5
GameZone	7.5/10
Nintendo Life	8/10
Nintendo Power	8.5/10
Nintendo World Report	8/10

Pokémon Trozei! was given an 8.25 out of 10 by Game Informer for being "both charming and challenging enough that even those nauseated by the thought of Pokémon should really pick it up anyway." Nintendo Power, which awarded the game an 8.5 out of 10, echoed that sentiment, stating it is "a stylish game that's a blast whether or not you're a fan [of Pokémon]". Alex Lucard of Diehard Game Fan gave it a score of 5.5 out of 10, saying that Pokémon Puzzle Challenge is better and cheaper.
