= Genius Sonority =

Japanese video game development studio

Genius Sonority, Inc.
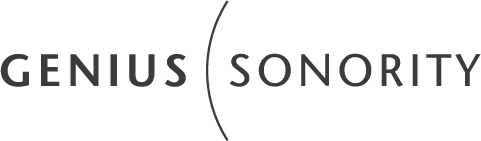
- Native name: ジニアス・ソノリティ株式会社
- Company type: Private
- Industry: Video games
- Founded: June 2002; 24 years ago
- Headquarters: Nihonbashi, Chūō, Tokyo, Japan
- Key people: Manabu Yamana (president, CEO)
- Products: Games for Nintendo video game consoles
- Number of employees: 20 (2024)
- Website: Genius Sonority

Genius Sonority, Inc. (ジニアス・ソノリティ株式会社, Jiniasu Sonoriti Kabushiki Kaisha) is a Japanese video game development studio, whose staff consists of programmers who have previously worked on the Dragon Quest series of video games.

== History ==
Genius Sonority was incorporated in June 2002 for the original purpose of developing Pokémon games for home consoles, with funding provided by Nintendo president Hiroshi Yamauchi’s Q Fund, a cash reserve used for Nintendo game company start-ups. Current shareholders of the company include Yamana Satoru, Nintendo, and The Pokémon Company. The company's founder and current president, Manabu Yamana, is best known as a key person at Heartbeat, a company that developed games in the Dragon Quest series for Enix. Yamana was joined in his efforts by members of Creatures Inc., the second-party Nintendo affiliate, which jointly owns the Pokémon Company and IP along with Nintendo and Game Freak.

As well as developing various Pokémon-related titles, they also co-developed Dragon Quest Swords: The Masked Queen and the Tower of Mirrors for the Wii with Eighting. The game was released in Japan in July 2007, and the rest of the world within ten months.

Genius Sonority's current flagship franchise is The Denpa Men, an RPG franchise revolving around forming a party by catching creatures known as "Denpa Men", who are randomly generated based on nearby Wi-Fi signals. The first game in the franchise, The Denpa Men: They Came By Wave, was released on Nintendo 3DS in 2012, and several games followed, including a mobile title and an entry for Nintendo Switch.

== Titles ==
Year	Title	Platform	Publisher	Notes
2003	Pokémon Colosseum	GameCube	Nintendo/The Pokémon Company	
2005	Pokémon XD: Gale of Darkness	GameCube	Nintendo/The Pokémon Company	
2006	Pokémon Trozei!	Nintendo DS	Nintendo/The Pokémon Company	
2006	Pokémon Battle Revolution	Wii	Nintendo/The Pokémon Company	
2007	Dragon Quest Swords: The Masked Queen and the Tower of Mirrors	Wii	Square Enix	Co-developed with Eighting
2007	100 Classic Book Collection	Nintendo DS	Nintendo	
2008	Disney Fairies: Tinker Bell	Nintendo DS	Disney Interactive	
2010	Otona no Renai Shōsetsu: Harlequin Selection	Nintendo DS	Nintendo	
2011	Learn with Pokémon: Typing Adventure	Nintendo DS	Nintendo/The Pokémon Company	
2012	The Denpa Men: They Came By Wave	Nintendo 3DS	Genius Sonority	
2012	The Denpa Men 2: Beyond the Waves	Nintendo 3DS	Genius Sonority	
2013	The Denpa Men 3: The Rise of Digitoll	Nintendo 3DS	Genius Sonority	
2014	Pokémon Battle Trozei	Nintendo 3DS	Nintendo/The Pokémon Company	
2014	The Denpa Men RPG Free!	Nintendo 3DS	Genius Sonority	
2015	Pokémon Shuffle	Nintendo 3DS, Android, iOS	Nintendo/The Pokémon Company	
2017	The New Denpa Men	Android, iOS	Genius Sonority	
2020	Pokémon Café ReMix	Nintendo Switch, Android, iOS	Nintendo/The Pokémon Company	
2024	The New Denpa Men RPG Free!	Nintendo Switch	Genius Sonority	
