= Cooking Guide: Can't Decide What to Eat? =

2008 video game

- Box art for the PAL version
- Developers: indieszero Nintendo NSD
- Publisher: Nintendo
- Composer: Toshiyuki Sudo
- Platform: Nintendo DS
- Release: EU: June 20, 2008; AU: July 3, 2008; NA: November 24, 2008; JP: December 4, 2008
- Genre: Edutainment
- Mode: Single-player

Cooking Guide: Can't Decide What to Eat?, (Note: Known in Japan as Sekai no Gohan: Shaberu! DS Oryōri Navi, (世界のごはん しゃべる！DSお料理ナビ, Meals of the World: Speak! DS Cooking Navigator)) released in North America as Personal Trainer: Cooking, is a 2008 video game developed by indieszero and published by Nintendo for the Nintendo DS. It was first released in Japan on December 4, 2008, followed by Europe on June 20, Australia on July 3, and North America on November 24. Cooking Guide is part of both Nintendo's Touch! Generations brand and a cooking tutorial software series started from a Japan-only title, Shaberu! DS Oryōri Navi. In North America, it is also part of the Personal Trainer series.

== Gameplay ==
Cooking Guide is an "interactive cooking aid" that gives step-by-step instructions on how to cook from a range of 245 dishes. Users are guided through the preparation and cooking process via audio narration and instructional video clips, and can use the Nintendo DS's voice recognition to proceed through each cooking step. Users can also choose recipes based on how many calories they have, or what ingredients they currently have at hand, among other options. Cooking Guide also keeps in memory what dishes users have already made. The application also allows users to take notes and compile a shopping list, and features functions such as a cooking timer and a quantity calculator. As a bonus, the Game & Watch game Chef can also be played after users unlock it by using the timer during preparation of a recipe, as in one of its predecessors, Shaberu! DS Oryōri Navi. The application guides users in either English, French, Italian, Japanese, German or Spanish.

== Development ==
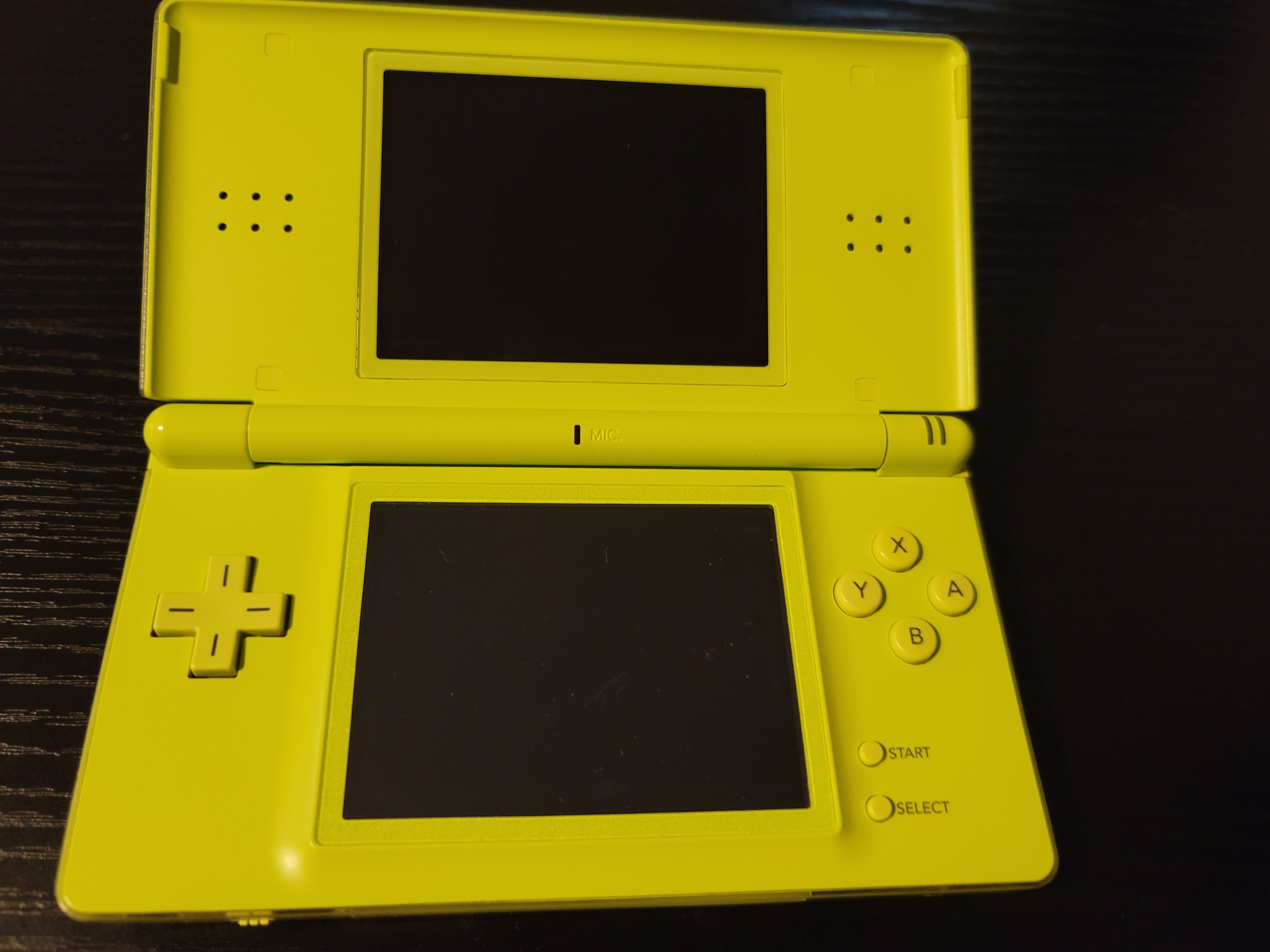
A special edition lime green DS Lite released in 2009 as a bundle with Personal Trainer Cooking

Released in Japan in 2006, Cooking Guide was originally shown to the US during Nintendo's Media Briefing at the Hollywood Kodak Theatre at E3 2008. It was later shown at the Nintendo US Press Conference Live Blog in San Francisco in October. After selling 600,000 units total in North America and Europe during its first two days of sales, the green-colored version of the DS Lite was later released on May 3, 2009.

== Reception ==
Reception

Aggregate score
Aggregator	Score
Metacritic	81%

Review scores
Publication	Score
Eurogamer	8 of 10
IGN	9.0 of 10

The game was generally well-received, receiving an 81% from Metacritic. Official Nintendo Magazine felt Cooking Guide's features make it "actually better than your average recipe book" and praised both the ease of use of the software and the range of recipes it offers, but considered the European retail price too steep. They gave it 80%. Pocket Gamer felt that while practiced cooks will have little use for it, on the whole it was more useful than other Touch! Generations titles such as Brain Training. IGN gave Personal Trainer: Cooking a 9/10, praising its accessibility, user interface and features such as the instructional audio narration. It was awarded Best Use of Sound by IGN in their 2008 video game awards.

Cooking Guide received an Excellence Prize for Entertainment at the 2006 Japan Media Arts Festival. Supermarket chain Asda has claimed that Cooking Guide has sold over 10,000 copies in the first hour of release alone, and has also positively affected the sales of products used in the application's recipes. The North American version was the 13th best-selling game and third best-selling Nintendo DS game of December 2008 in the United States.

== Sequels and spin-offs ==
Cooking Guide was the first of five sequels to the Japan-only Shaberu! DS Oryōri Navi, with development split between Nintendo and Koei. Nintendo itself issued a Japan only sequel Kenkou Ouen Recipe 1000: DS Kondate Zenshuu (健康応援レシピ1000 DS献立全集, lit. "Health Boost Recipe 1000: DS Complete Menu") and the North America-only 2010 release America's Test Kitchen: Let's Get Cooking, based on the PBS program, America's Test Kitchen after Cook's Illustrated magazine helped the publisher to write the game.

Koei's releases are both Japan only, with the company releasing Shaberu! DS Oryōri Navi: Marugoto Teikoku Hotel]しゃべる!DSお料理ナビ まるごと帝国ホテル (It Talks! DS Cooking Navigator: The Marugoto Empire Hotel) and Kantan! Tanoshii! Okashi Navi DS (かんたん!たのしい!お菓子ナビDS, Simple! Fun! Pastry Navigator DS).

== See also ==
- What's Cooking? with Jamie Oliver
- List of Nintendo DS games
- Personal Trainer: Walking
- Personal Trainer: Math
