= Pokémon Battle Trozei =

2014 video game

- European marketing artwork
- Developer: Genius Sonority
- Publishers: JP: The Pokémon Company; WW: Nintendo
- Director: Manabu Yamana
- Producers: Shusaku Egami; Takato Utsunomiya; Hitoshi Yamagami
- Artist: Yoshinori Obishaku
- Composer: Tsukasa Tawada
- Series: Pokémon
- Platform: Nintendo 3DS
- Release: JP: 12 March 2014; EU: 13 March 2014; AU: 14 March 2014; NA: 20 March 2014
- Genre: Puzzle
- Modes: Single-player, multiplayer

Pokémon Battle Trozei (Note: Japanese: ポケモンバトルトローゼ, Hepburn: Pokemon Batoru Torōze) (Note: Released as Pokémon Link: Battle! in Europe and Australia) is a 2014 puzzle game developed by Genius Sonority and published by The Pokémon Company and Nintendo for the Nintendo 3DS. It is the sequel to Pokémon Trozei! (2005). It was released in the Nintendo eShop in Japan on 12 March 2014, in Europe on 13 March 2014, in Australia on 14 March 2014, and in North America on 20 March 2014. The game includes all 718 Pokémon that were known at the time.

== Gameplay ==
The player battles a water-type Pokémon (Froakie) using grass-type ones.

The gameplay of Pokémon Battle Trozei is similar to the Japanese mobile game Puzzle & Dragons. In the game, players engage in a Pokémon battle depicted on the top screen of the handheld device. To battle the enemy Pokémon, players create groups of three or more identical Pokémon icons on the grid in the bottom screen. The battles are fought using a rock-paper-scissors style system where each Pokémon has different elemental types assigned to it, and the outcome is based on the strengths and weaknesses that these types have on each other. This mechanic of elemental strengths and weaknesses borrows from the main Pokémon role-playing games. This is the first Pokémon puzzle game to borrow rules from the main series. In addition to the matching mechanic, the game requires strategy when considering which Pokémon types to use in battle. This strategy element puts players that are unfamiliar with the Pokémon series at a disadvantage because they may not know the element types of each of the game's 718 Pokémon.

The game features the same Pokémon from Pokémon Trozei! but also features Pokémon from Sinnoh, Unova and Kalos, except Diancie, Hoopa and Volcanion. The game supports cooperative multiplayer for up to four players.

== Development ==
The game was revealed on 13 February 2014 in a Nintendo Direct, and was released in the Nintendo eShop in Japan on 12 March 2014, in Europe on 13 March 2014, in Australia on 14 March 2014, and in North America on 20 March 2014. The game includes all 718 Pokémon that were known at the time. A Nintendo 3DS XL game system with a decorative Pokémon Battle Trozei theme was released in Japan, but the special edition handheld was only given to winners of competitions held by the Pokémon Daisuki Club, a Japanese club for Pokémon fans. Upon the game's release, customers in Japan could also purchase a set of kuji cards which came with a chance to win a Trozei themed cushion, mug, pencil case, or other item. The Japanese Pokémon Center also had Trozei merchandise for sale including stickers, jigsaw puzzles, and notebooks.

== Reception ==
Reception

Aggregate scores
Aggregator	Score
GameRankings	68%
Metacritic	70/100

Review scores
Publication	Score
Destructoid	6.5/10
Game Informer	6/10
IGN	7/10
Nintendo World Report	7/10
WeGotThisCovered	3.5/5

The game received average reviews upon release, garnering a score of 70 out of 100 on the review aggregation website Metacritic. IGN reviewer Scott Thompson commended the game for using the strategic combat system from the Pokémon RPG series rather than simply creating a puzzle game with a Pokémon theme. He praised the game's local cooperative multiplayer as well; however, he did note that the user interface for the game lacked sufficient details for players not familiar with every Pokémon type. Kinja.com criticized the game's lack of online multiplayer and its ho-hum music, but praised its solid gameplay mechanics and art style.
