= Big Brain Academy: Brain vs. Brain =

2021 video game

- The North American game icon
- Developer: Nintendo EPD (Note: Additional work by indieszero)
- Publisher: Nintendo
- Director: Kenta Kubo
- Producer: Koichi Kawamoto
- Composers: Sayako Doi; Masaru Tajima
- Series: Big Brain Academy
- Engine: Bezel Engine
- Platform: Nintendo Switch
- Release: WW: December 3, 2021
- Genres: Party, puzzle, edutainment
- Modes: Single-player, multiplayer

Big Brain Academy: Brain vs. Brain (Note: Known in Japan as Yawarakātamajuku Issho ni a Tama no Sutoretchi (やわらかあたま塾 いっしょにあたまのストレッチ, lit. "Soft Head Academy: Brain Stretching Together")) is a 2021 edutainment party video game developed by Nintendo EPD and published by Nintendo. The game released on December 3, 2021 for the Nintendo Switch. It is the third entry in the Big Brain Academy series, following the release of Big Brain Academy (2005) and Big Brain Academy: Wii Degree (2007) over a decade later. In Big Brain Academy: Brain vs. Brain, the player creates an avatar, using them to solve a series of brain teasers in single-player or multiplayer modes. The director, Kenta Kubo, designed it to be fun and enjoyable for his own family, adjusting the difficulty levels in classes to make it more suitable for all ages.

Big Brain Academy: Brain vs. Brain received mixed reviews from critics. It was praised for its presentation, multiplayer, and educational value, with criticism drawn for its limited gameplay offerings as a party game. It has sold over 1.94 million copies by December 2022, making it one of the best-selling games on the Nintendo Switch.

== Gameplay ==
Four players in the Party mode solving puzzles in the Cubegame Analyze activity

Big Brain Academy: Brain vs. Brain is a party, puzzle, and educational video game containing a collection of brain teasers the player must solve. The player attempts to solve puzzles in various minigames. Dr. Lobe returns as the professor for the series, guiding the player through menus and awarding scores for activities. There are twenty different activities across five categories: Identify, Memorize, Analyze, Compute, and Visualize. Each category tests a different part of the brain, with most activities based around improving accuracy and reaction time. For most of the categories, three of the four minigames originated from Big Brain Academy: Wii Degree.

In the Practice mode, players attempt to solve as many puzzles in the selected minigame as fast as possible within the time limit to earn a high score. As they progress and solve more problems, their class will automatically scale relative to their correct and incorrect answers. There are six classes that can be selected to determine the difficulty of the exercises. At the end of the activity, they are given a “Big Brain Brawn” score based on their performance. If the player performed exceptionally well, they can also receive collectable bronze, silver, gold, and platinum medals with up to three stars per activity. Once gold medals are obtained for every activity, Super Practice mode is unlocked, starting the player at a higher class. Additionally, the player can take a Test, which combines one minigame from all categories and gradually scales in difficulty. Once a Test is completed, the player is given a Big Brain Brawn score as well as a “Brain Grade”, determining how well they performed and what activity they performed best in.

Rankings in the Practice mode can be shared online for use in the Ghost Clash mode where players can compete against the data of other users asynchronously. As the user defeats more opponents online, they earn trophies to top the online leaderboard. Up to four people can partake in the multiplayer Party mode, in which they can select their own starting level of difficulty. There are two game modes: Spin the Wheel, where a random activity is selected, and Choose a Category, where the players decide what minigames to play. A set number of matches are played with the goal being to reach 100 points, and the player with the highest cumulative score is declared the winner. If a player is underperforming compared to others, they can earn lots of points as a comeback bonus before an activity ends. An additional multiplayer tabletop mode has two players face head-to-head using the touchscreen of the Nintendo Switch. After playing any game mode, coins are distributed to the player, with ten coins unlocking cosmetics for their avatar. Avatars can be customized using multiple different costumes and titles that can describe their avatar's profile.

== Development and promotion ==
Big Brain Academy: Brain vs. Brain was developed by Nintendo EPD Production Group No. 4, with programming and graphical assistance by indieszero. The director, Kenta Kuba, had not worked on the series prior. He was contacted by the producer Koichi Kawamoto to bring the idea to Nintendo Switch, and directed the game with the idea of providing a fun experience for his child, himself, and his entire family playing together. He was assisted by Tomoaki Yoshinobu, the previous director of the series, and Hideki Fujii, the previous designer. One of the first decisions during the planning phase was bringing back Dr. Lobe, the guide character from the previous two entries, as per request of Yoshinobu. The development team monitored playtests with children to see how they would react, noticing that the children played the minigames significantly slower and reacted to in-game sounds differently. This allowed the development team to adjust the difficulty categories and sound effects to make them suitable for a five-year-old child as well as an experienced gamer. The online mode also used asynchronous data from players to reduce the competitive nature of online multiplayer. Prior to its reveal, a survey by Nintendo of America was distributed in June 2021 asking users if they would be interested in buying a brain training game for Nintendo Switch.

Big Brain Academy: Brain vs. Brain was first announced on September 2, 2021, and shared the release date of December 3, 2021 with Advance Wars 1+2: Re-Boot Camp prior to its multiple delays. Nintendo released commercials starring Christina Aguilera, and Neil Patrick Harris alongside his family to promote the game. A demo featuring select activities was released on November 16, 2021. On December 27, 2021, an update added a "Creepy Crawlies" section in the options, removing photos of animals from certain game modes to benefit users with arachnophobia and other animal-related fears. On June 5, 2025, the game was updated with GameShare support for Nintendo Switch 2 systems, allowing multiplayer with up to four players in the Party mode.

== Reception ==
=== Critical reception ===
Reception

Aggregate scores
Aggregator	Score
Metacritic	73/100 (Note: Score based on 68 reviews)
OpenCritic	53% recommend (Note: Score based on 62 reviews)

Review scores
Publication	Score
Digital Trends	3/5
Famitsu	7/10, 8/10, 8/10, 7/10
GameSpot	7/10
Jeuxvideo.com	14/20
Nintendo Life	8/10
Nintendo World Report	7.5/10
NME	4/5
Shacknews	8/10
TouchArcade	3.5/5
Digital Spy	3.5/5
Pocket Tactics	7/10
The Games Machine	8/10

Big Brain Academy: Brain vs. Brain received mixed or average reviews according to the review aggregator website Metacritic. According to review aggregator OpenCritic, the game received fair approval from critics. In their summary, Siliconera's Graham Russell stated it "doesn't try to do too much", but serves as a "refreshing throwback to the Nintendo DS era".

Shaun Musgrave of TouchArcade claimed it to be a lackluster party game, comparing it less favorably than the recently released WarioWare: Get It Together! and Mario Party Superstars in 2021. Writers of CD-Action similarly believed Brain vs. Brain "pales in comparison" to Mario Party Superstars. Conversely, Sergio González of MeriStation considered the title "equally valuable in its educational component" compared to other party games, while Dayna Eileen of CGMagazine thought it brought "some new takes on the genre".

Most critics thought the game was light on content and lacked depth, particularly for its single-player offerings. When referring to the minigames, Jess Lee of Digital Spy claimed "the game could have benefitted from having several more for improved variety and replay value", and Alexis Mariel Zema of Jeuxvideo.com claimed the twenty minigames contributed to a lack of motivation to continue playing. Others believed the content both lacked significant depth and got repetitive over time. Neal Ronaghan of Nintendo World Report claimed its Practice mode had a "lack of offline longevity", while Shaun Musgrave of TouchArcade claimed that the twenty minigames included, although fine, were not enough to prevent repetition. Fran G. Matas of Vandal described the single-player experience as stagnant, one that can only played for a few minutes per day. Andrew Webster of The Verge believed it would not be a game they play by themselves often, instead being "more like a board game" that is best played with friends. Many critics praised the Ghost Clash mode, with 3DJuegos claiming it to be the best game mode in their recommendation. Ronaghan stated the mode was an "engaging and replayable way to interact with Big Brain Academy by yourself", whereas Musgrave considered it the most fun mode. Alex Olney of Nintendo Life thought it was unfortunate there was no option for simultaneous online multiplayer, but appreciated the ghost battles for diminishing the issue of online latency. Critics noted that touch controls had a distinct competitive advantage when playing Ghost Clash. Although the user's method of control is displayed for online rankings, Ozzie Mejia of Shacknews found it irritating they were required to undock their system to fairly compete against others.

Critics believed the difficulty balance was fair, complimenting it for its accessibility regarding a wide age demographic. Alex Olney of Nintendo Life claimed it was "a genuine challenge even for adult players", containing a relatively fair scoring system. Jess Lee of Digital Spy claimed it remained "engaging and competitive" when playing with a variety of age groups, while Jen Allen of NME called its gameplay "smartly designed" for the whole family so no player would be at a significant advantage or disadvantage. Being a budget title compared to other Nintendo releases, most critics believed the game was priced relatively fair, despite claims of lacking content. Both Digital Trends and Pocket Tactics expressed interest in a mobile version due to its simple user interface and touchscreen support, claiming it would have been better suited as one of Nintendo's mobile applications as opposed to a Nintendo Switch game. Critics thought the game was very similar to its predecessors, with some believing it was not taking advantage of the Nintendo Switch's unique features. Giovanni Colantonio of Digital Trends stated "its multiplayer options are shallow compared to the Wii installment", since Big Brain Academy: Wii Degree contained more than one distinct multiplayer mode. Famitsu writer Amamiya similarly thought it was a remake of the previous installment. Although the contents of Big Brain Academy: Brain vs. Brain were met with mixed opinions, many critics believed the game was a good educational tool for young children and a suitable game for all ages. Dayna Eileen of CGMagazine was "pleasantly surprised" her six-year-old son comprehended the exercises, helping to grow his confidence. Luca Forte of Multiplayer.it claimed the game helps children with "exercising their calculation skills, lateral thinking, and memory". David Martínez of HobbyConsolas claimed it to be a great method for brain training and working under pressure, as well as exercising previously dormant skills. It is considered a great educational game for children on the Nintendo Switch by the parenting journalists at Parents. Kayleigh Partleton of Pocket Tactics considered it one of the best brain training games of all time. The presentation, visuals, and customization for avatars were all met with praise. Forte thought the "colorful doodle graphics" and "Animal Crossing-style sounds" provided a more engaging experience, while Ozzie Mejia of Shacknews thought the "vast array of customization options" provided an incentive to replay daily.

=== Sales ===
Big Brain Academy: Brain vs. Brain sold 36,928 physical copies in Japan and debuted at the third position on the Famitsu sales charts during its first week. It held a position among the top ten game sales in Japan for eight consecutive weeks, and remained on the Famitsu sales chart for an additional seven weeks. The game sold 1.28 million copies worldwide by the end of 2021. As of May 8, 2022, approximately 276,360 copies have been sold in Japan. It has sold a total of 1.94 million copies as of December 31, 2022, making it one of the best-selling Nintendo Switch games.
