= Sutte Hakkun =

1997 video game

- Developers: Nintendo R&D2; Indieszero
- Publisher: Nintendo
- Director: Masayu Nakata
- Producer: Masayuki Uemura
- Designers: Nobuaki Tanaka; Nozomi Kitsuta
- Programmer: Keiji Hara
- Artist: Nobuaki Tanaka
- Composers: Masanori Tanaka; Akito Nakatsuka
- Platform: Super Famicom
- Release: JP: November 2, 1997
- Genres: Platform, puzzle
- Mode: Single-player

Sutte Hakkun (Note: Japanese: すってはっくん) is a 1997 action puzzle video game developed by Indieszero with Nintendo R&D2 and published by Nintendo. It was created for the Super Famicom's add-on, the Satellaview, first datacasting the game on November 2, 1997. Three different updates involving new puzzles were released from 1998 to 1999. The game received its first re-release outside of Japan on the Nintendo Classics service on January 24, 2025.

== Gameplay ==
In-game screenshot

Sutte Hakkun falls into the category of a side-scrolling, level-based action puzzle game, a genre best represented by the Lode Runner series. The player controls Hakkun, and attempts to gather the rainbow shards distributed across each level. A level is completed when the player finds all the shards hidden in the level. Levels are arranged simplistically at the start of the game, but become highly complex and difficult near the end. The final goal is to find all the shards hidden in the game.

Hakkun's actions consist of three movements; running to the left or right, jumping, and absorbing or depositing blocks. A combination of these is required to complete each level. The player must restart the level if Hakkun falls into a hole or touches spike traps, but there are no other impediments, such as time limits or enemy characters, towards completing each level. There are also no lives or game over screens, and the more difficult later levels are completed by repeatedly searching the level for the solution to the puzzle. Completion of the game requires a combination of puzzle-solving ability and precise control of Hakkun by the player.

Several types of traps and characters are prepared in each level, some of which help Hakkun, and others which may obstruct his path. The most important of these are the red, blue, and yellow bottles and transparent blocks. Hakkun can suck out colors from each bottle, and insert them into the transparent blocks to make them move in different directions.

== Development ==
In response to the significant decrease in the number of original games presented over Satellaview's "Super Famicom Hour" data broadcast in 1996, Nintendo began the "Monthly Game Event" series in 1997, where a new game would be broadcast each month for the Super Famicom. However, many of these were rereleases of older games, such as Dr. Mario and F-Zero. The intricate puzzles and user-friendly tutorial made Sutte Hakkun considered by most Satellaview consumers in Japan one of the most popular games ever released for the Satellaview. The game was produced by Masayuki Uemura, composed by Akito Nakatsuka, designed by Nobuaki Tanaka, directed by Masayu Nakata, and programmed by Keiji Hara. Software for the Famicom Disk System that the third stage participant of "Nintendo & Dentsu Game Seminar" (任天堂・電通ゲームセミナー) had produced is assumed to be a prototype established by the graduate of Indieszero. This work became the debut work of Indieszero.

== Release ==
Five versions of the game exist; four of which were released over Satellaview, and one in game cartridge format. Of the four games for Satellaview, the event version and BS version 2 were broadcast up until June 2000, when Satellaview service ended permanently. A retail release was published in 1998. The game was made available for Nintendo Power, a data writing service offered at Lawson convenience stores. Taking advantage of the larger memory of the Nintendo Power cartridge (3 times that of Satellaview), the creators not only expanded the number of puzzles, but added a more in-depth tutorial, and additional hints towards completing the game. However, the decline of the Super Famicom and the lack of availability of Nintendo Power cartridges prevented the game from reaching a mainstream audience. The game was still well received among former Satellaview users and hardcore Nintendo fans. Points were recorded in a rankings system in the original Satellaview broadcast, and were posted on Nintendo's website until 2009.

- Sutte Hakkun Event Version - broadcast started on November 2, 1997.

The game was first released as the November portion of the Satellaview monthly game contest, and consisted of 50 levels with 5 additional bonus levels. The game data takes all the 8M memory pack for Satellaview, a large amount of memory for a data broadcast. The game was re-broadcast later with a rankings system. This was the first game ever created by Indieszero, but the company name never appears in the game itself.

- Sutte Hakkun (for Nintendo Power) - broadcast started on August 1, 1998, discontinued on February 28, 2007.

This new version was released exclusively for Nintendo Power. Initially offered for 3,000 yen, the price was lowered to 2,000 yen the following year. This commercial version featured considerable improvements in graphics and a large increase in length (110 levels). The end credits showed the Indieszero logo and name for the first time.

- Sutte Hakkun BS Version 2 - broadcast started in October 1998.

This version was also released for Satellaview, and was a remake of the event version with new puzzles. It consisted of 30 levels and 3 bonus levels. There was no rankings system included in this release.

- Sutte Hakkun '98 Winter Event Version - broadcast started on December 20, 1998.

This was the last version released for Satellaview. Similar to the BS version, it was a remake of the first with new puzzles (30 levels + 3 bonus levels). The graphic themes center around Winter and Christmas.

- Sutte Hakkun (for ROM cartridge) - released on June 25, 1999.

The final release was a cartridge version of the 1998 Nintendo Power release, which sold for 4,200 yen. The content of the game is identical to that of the previous release, but a detailed instruction manual with various tips and tricks was included with the game. It was one of the last video games released for the Super Famicom.

In 2017, an English fan translation of the game was released. In 2020, ROMs for unreleased Game Boy and Game Boy Color versions of the game, the latter titled Sutte Hakkun GB, were found in the Nintendo data leak. On March 2, 2010, the game was re-released on Wii Virtual Console. On February 4, 2015, the game was re-released on Wii U Virtual Console. On January 24, 2025, Sutte Hakkun was re-released on the Nintendo Classics service for Nintendo Switch Online members, marking its first release outside of Japan.

== Reception ==
Reception

Review scores
Publication	Score
Famitsu	28/40
Nintendo Life	9/10

Upon release, Famitsu gave the SFC version of the game a score of 28 out of 40.

In 2009, Nintendo Life gave the game a score of 9 out of 10. Dustin Bailey of GamesRadar+ described how the game developed a cult following, considering it one of the best Satellaview titles.
