= Indieszero =

Japanese video game developer

indieszero Corporation, Ltd.
- Type: Private
- Founded: April 21, 1997; 29 years ago
- Headquarters: Kichijoji Hommachi 1-31-11 KS building 7F, Musashino, Tokyo, Japan
- Key people: Masanobu Suzui (鈴井匡伸)
- Products: Video games
- Brands: monsteroctopus
- Number of employees: 55 (April 2026)
- Website: indieszero.co.jp

indieszero Corporation, Ltd. (Japanese: 有限会社インディーズゼロ) is a Japanese video game developer headquartered in Musashino, Tokyo, Japan. Founded on April 21, 1997, it is a frequent collaborator with Nintendo, developing some of their smaller scale and more experimental titles.

== Overview ==
The name is a portmanteau, indicating independent video games with a low budget and minimal connections to other developers, which is described as "almost zero".

The philosophy of the company is to make games that are easy to understand and user-friendly. The company initially specialized in games for handheld game consoles, but eventually expanded to smartphones. It makes licensed trading-card games for popular franchises such as Legend of Mana and Final Fantasy.

The founder Masanobu Suzui commented that the company plans to "make new products that has never been created before". He regards the company as a game developer that "cherishes a creative viewpoint rather than state-of-the-art technology capabilities" and makes games that can be immersed by a long-time video game player but also aimed at what everyone can easily play.

== History ==
In 1997, at age 24, Masunobu Suzui founded the company along with two members from the fresh graduate discovery project Nintendo & Dentsu Game Seminar (predecessor of the current Nintendo Game Seminar). They were initially tasked with developing for Nintendo's Satellaview peripheral for the Super Famicom. This includes Sutto Hankoku and Cooking Pong!.

The company developed many games for the Nintendo DS such as Electroplankton. Shaberu! DS Oryōri Navi released by Nintendo in July 2006 won the 10th Media Arts Festival Entertainment Division Excellence Award. Oshare Majo: Love and Berry was released from Sega in November, with one million copies sold and a special prize in the annual work section of the Japan Game Award 2007.

In June 2011, the company released DualPenSports as its first Nintendo 3DS game. It then collaborated with Square Enix on Theatrhythm Final Fantasy, in which Masunobu Suzui reunited with former Bandai producer Ikuro Kuroku. The game was ported to iOS and arcade, and had two independent sequels titled Theatrhythm Final Fantasy: Curtain Call and Theatrhythm Dragon Quest.

The company collaborated with Nintendo EAD for the development of NES Remix for both the Nintendo 3DS and the Wii U. During the planning phase, Koichi Hayashida, the Director of Nintendo Tokyo Production Department, who had participated in the Nintendo & Dentsu Game Seminar as a student together with Masunobu Suzui, called Suzui to partner on the game development. Suzui brought a prototype, which Hayashida immediately approved. Development of the Nintendo 3DS Guide Louvre Museum was recently completed, so the company was able to commit to the project. The game was well-reviewed and two sequels in the form of NES Remix 2 and Ultimate NES Remix were developed.

The company first mobile game is Grand Marche no Meikyuu, released in September 2016. The game was developed in collaboration with Square Enix, after development of Theatrhythm Dragon Quest. Square Enix announced the game server's closure in November 2017.

During Nintendo's E3 Presentation in 2017, the company was revealed to be co-developing Sushi Striker: The Way of Sushido, a strategic action-RPG-puzzle game for the Nintendo 3DS with Nintendo. It was ported as the company's first Nintendo Switch game, to be released on the same day as the 3DS version, and revealed in a Nintendo Direct in March 2018.

== List of games ==
Year	Title	Publisher	Platform
1997	Sutte Hakkun	Nintendo	Super Famicom
1997	Oryouri Pon!	Nintendo	Super Famicom
1998	Denshi no Seirei Chi-bitto	Banpresto	Windows
2002	Sakura Momoko no Ukiuki Carnival	Nintendo	Game Boy Advance
2003	Mario Party-e	Nintendo	Game Boy Advance
2005	Sennen Kazoku	Nintendo	Game Boy Advance
2005	Electroplankton	Nintendo	Nintendo DS, Nintendo DSi
2006	Shaberu! DS Oryōri Navi	Nintendo	Nintendo DS
2006	Oshare Majo: Love and Berry DS Collection	Sega	Nintendo DS
2007	Retro Game Challenge	Namco Bandai Games	Nintendo DS
2008	DS Bimoji Training	Nintendo	Nintendo DS
2008	Cooking Guide: Can't Decide What to Eat?	Nintendo	Nintendo DS
2009	Retro Game Challenge 2	Namco Bandai Games	Nintendo DS
2010	America's Test Kitchen: Let's Get Cooking	Nintendo	Nintendo DS
2011	DualPenSports	Namco Bandai Games	Nintendo 3DS
2012	Theatrhythm Final Fantasy	Square Enix	Nintendo 3DS, iOS
2013	Nintendo 3DS Guide: Louvre	Nintendo	Nintendo 3DS
2013	NES Remix	Nintendo	Wii U
2014	Theatrhythm Final Fantasy: Curtain Call	Square Enix	Nintendo 3DS
2014	NES Remix 2	Nintendo	Wii U
2014	Ultimate NES Remix	Nintendo	Nintendo 3DS
2015	Theatrhythm Dragon Quest	Square Enix	Nintendo 3DS
2015	Real Escape Game X Nintendo 3DS	Nintendo	Nintendo 3DS
2016	Grand Marche no Meikyuu	Square Enix	iOS, Android
2016	Theatrhythm Final Fantasy All-Star Carnival	Square Enix	Arcade
2018	Sushi Striker: The Way of Sushido	Nintendo	Nintendo 3DS, Nintendo Switch
2019	Dr Kawashima's Brain Training for Nintendo Switch	Nintendo	Nintendo Switch
2020	Kingdom Hearts: Melody of Memory	Square Enix	Nintendo Switch, PlayStation 4, Xbox One, Windows
2021	Big Brain Academy: Brain vs. Brain	Nintendo	Nintendo Switch
2023	Theatrhythm Final Bar Line	Square Enix	Nintendo Switch, PlayStation 4
2024	GameCenter CX: Arino no Chousenjou 1+2 REPLAY	Bandai Namco Entertainment	Nintendo Switch
2024	Nintendo World Championships: NES Edition	Nintendo	Nintendo Switch
2025	Shogakukan Manga App CoroCoro Comic 2024	Shogakukan	Nintendo Switch
2025	Shogakukan Manga App CoroCoro Comic 2025	Shogakukan	Nintendo Switch
2025	Shogakukan Manga App Fate Rewinder	Shogakukan	Nintendo Switch
2025	Shogakukan Manga App Splatoon	Shogakukan	Nintendo Switch
2026	Shogakukan Manga App CoroCoro Comic 2026	Shogakukan	Nintendo Switch
