= What's Cooking? with Jamie Oliver =

2008 cooking video game

- Developers: keen games GmbH & Co. KG
- Publisher: Atari Europe
- Platform: Nintendo DS
- Release: NA: October 21, 2008; EU: October 24, 2008; AU: November 6, 2008
- Genres: Cooking, Educational
- Modes: Single-player, multiplayer

What's Cooking? with Jamie Oliver, sometimes known as What's Cooking? Jamie Oliver, is a cooking video game for the Nintendo DS narrated by celebrity chef Jamie Oliver. It was developed by German studio keen games GmbH & Co. KG and published by Atari Europe.

The game features several recipes, each listing preparation times, ingredients and courses. In addition, What's Cooking? can be used as a shopping list to remind players what items to purchase, and it can act as a timer to count down from a specified time and make an audible sound when it is done.

The game was first revealed by Atari at the Games Convention 2008. The game was poorly received after its release. Reviewers generally agreed that presenting a cooking guide as a video game was a good idea, but they found that the game was poorly executed and mediocre as a result.

== Gameplay ==
The cooking challenge portion requires that the player cook virtual meals before the timer runs out.

What's Cooking? is an interactive cookbook and food preparation video game with recipes that each list preparation times, ingredients and courses. Recipes can be sorted by criteria such as dishes that take less than 20 minutes to prepare, or vegetarian-only meals. After opening a recipe, an ingredient list is presented. Items on the list can be earmarked and added to a shopping list as a reminder to purchase in the future. A timer option is also available, which counts down from a specified time and makes an audible sound when it is done. Before doing any real cooking, a virtual representation of each step in the recipe is given on the screen that must be performed by the player. The Nintendo DS touchscreen and stylus are used to perform tasks such as whisking eggs, pouring sauces and cutting vegetables. Tutorials are also available to teach the player how to perform simple cooking preparation tasks. While cooking, the Nintendo DS responds to audible commands; saying "next" into the device's microphone will move the recipe on to the next step. One hundred recipes are included in the game, and players can create their own dishes in the game. Afterward, they can share them with others via Wi-Fi. In addition to the game's cooking aspects, What's Cooking? features challenges in which the player uses the stylus to chop, stir, and serve as quickly as possible.

== Development ==
What's Cooking? was first revealed by Atari at the Games Convention 2008. The game is narrated by Jamie Oliver. In an interview with Official Nintendo Magazine, Oliver noted that he tries to make his games as "three dimensional as possible", and he wanted to "make it relevant" to the player. The developers also wanted to make the game as interactive as possible.

== Reception ==
Reception

Aggregate score
Aggregator	Score
Metacritic	47 of 100

Review scores
Publication	Score
Eurogamer	7 of 10
GameRevolution	D+
GameZone	3 of 10
IGN	4.9 of 10
Jeuxvideo.com	10 of 20
Official Nintendo Magazine	70%

What's Cooking? received "unfavorable" reviews according to the review aggregation website Metacritic. IGN's Daemon Hatfield called disguising a cooking tutorial as a video game a "pretty brilliant idea", but only as long as it was done well. He stated that both the cookbook and food preparation halves of the game were not strong enough to make the game worth purchasing. Hatfield commented that the game's controls are "terribly unintuitive, and the cookbook doesn't offer anything its physical counterpart can't for cheaper". He was also disappointed that there were no pictures to illustrate each step, and not every cooking process is explained. Eurogamer's Ellie Gibson was satisfied with the number of recipes available, most of which were "pretty easy to follow". Gibson, however, preferred to see instructional videos to observe how a recipe was made before making it.

In their review of the game, Official Nintendo Magazine commented that the stylus-controlled cooking tutorials are not user-friendly, and the recipe sharing is as good as it could be since players can only use ingredients and methods from recipes that they have unlocked through playing the game. They felt that the game attempts to appeal to gamers rather than aspiring chefs, concluding, "[The game has] some great recipes but the experience is marred by some fiddly cooking games."

== See also ==
- Cooking Guide: Can't Decide What to Eat?
- Cooking Mama
