= NES Remix =

Video game series

- Logo
- Genre: Action
- Developer: Nintendo EAD Tokyo (Note: Additional work by indieszero)
- Publisher: Nintendo
- Producer: Yoshiaki Koizumi
- Composer: Toshiyuki Sudo
- Platforms: Wii U, Nintendo 3DS
- Original release: December 18, 2013: NES Remix; NA/EU: December 18, 2013; JP: December 19, 2013 NES Remix 2; JP: April 24, 2014; NA/EU: April 25, 2014 NES Remix Pack; JP: April 24, 2014; NA: December 5, 2014 Ultimate NES Remix; EU: November 7, 2014; AU: November 8, 2014; NA: December 5, 2014; JP: August 27, 2015
- First release: NES Remix; December 18, 2013
- Latest release: Ultimate NES Remix; November 7, 2014

NES Remix (Note: Famicom Remix (Japanese: ファミコンリミックス, Hepburn: Famikon Rimikkusu)) is a compilation video game series developed and published by Nintendo for the Wii U. The first and eponymous game was simultaneously announced and released on December 18, 2013, on the Nintendo eShop following a Nintendo Direct presentation. A second game, NES Remix 2, (Note: Famicom Remix 2 (Japanese: ファミコンリミックス2, Hepburn: Famikon Rimikkusu Tsū)) was released on April 25, 2014. A retail edition consisting of both games, titled NES Remix Pack, (Note: Famicom Remix 1+2 (Japanese: ファミコンリミックス 1+2, Hepburn: Famikon Rimikkusu Wan Purasu Tsū)) was released on April 24, 2014, in Japan and December 5 in North America. Another title, Ultimate NES Remix (Note: Famicom Remix Best Choice (Japanese: ファミコンリミックス ベストチョイス, Hepburn: Famikon Rimikkusu Besutochoisu)) for Nintendo 3DS, was released on November 7–8, 2014 in Europe and Australia, December 5 in North America and August 27, 2015, in Japan.

The first game in the series, NES Remix, is composed of 16 vintage Nintendo Entertainment System games with a total of 204 challenges throughout; the second game, NES Remix 2, features 12 additional NES games with a further 169 challenges. Mostly composed of vintage excerpts from games, these compilations also present special categories of stages called remixes to additionally concoct unique challenges not possible in the original games. The purchase of both NES Remix and NES Remix 2 unlocks Championship Mode in the latter, sporting an online leaderboards system.

== Gameplay ==
Screenshot of NES Remix gameplay

Most challenges are simply excerpts from vintage games, involving timed tasks such as speedrunning, clearing an area without dying, or defeating a certain number of enemies while utilizing a given power-up.

The remix categories are additionally based on the fundamental reshaping or combination of games, sometimes by blending in more modern graphical features of the Wii U, for a new experience that may even be technologically impossible on the vintage NES. For example: completing a darkened level which is lit only by a spotlight superimposed over the player's character; navigating upon disappearing platforms in Super Mario Bros.; or playing a Donkey Kong stage as Link instead of Mario, challenged by Link's inability to jump.

NES Remix 2 contains two particularly substantial remixes. Reminiscent of 1990's Nintendo World Championships tour across America, the Nintendo World Championships Remix is unlocked if NES Remix is also purchased and its save file is present. This remix pushes players through three successive challenges in Super Mario Bros., Super Mario Bros. 3, and Dr. Mario, in order to achieve a ranking score on its new online leaderboards. Super Luigi Bros. (Note: Super Luigi Bros. (Japanese: スーパールイージブラザーズ, Hepburn: Sūpā Ruīji Burazāzu)) is a Luigi themed remix of the entire Super Mario Bros. game which is now played reverse-mirrored from right to left. It features Luigi's higher jumping ability which had not been originally introduced until the 1986 Japanese sequel Super Mario Bros. 2.

Ultimate NES Remix is a Nintendo 3DS game featuring a select compilation of games and challenges from the first two Wii U releases. It uniquely features Speed Mario Bros., (Note: Speed Mario Bros. (Japanese: スピードマリオブラザーズ, Hepburn: Supīdo Mario Burazāzu)) which is the entirety of the original Super Mario Bros. running at a much faster speed. Ultimate NES Remix also has a new mode known as Famicom Remix, which is unlocked by getting all the stars from the original missions. It has all the missions from the original mode, but all the games featured runs on the original Famicom hardware.

Aside from Nintendo World Championships Remix's online leaderboards, a good performance will reward players with stars and points. These stars and points accumulate to unlock new challenge stages and collectible stamps. These stamped graphical icons, along with NES Remix 2's support for video recording, can add flair to Miiverse posts. Off-TV Play is supported.

== Games ==
Title	NES/FC release	NES Remix	NES Remix 2	Ultimate NES Remix
Balloon Fight	1985	Yes	No	Yes
Baseball	1983	Yes	No	No
Clu Clu Land	1984	Yes	No	No
Donkey Kong	1983	Yes	No	Yes
Donkey Kong Jr.	1983	Yes	No	Yes
Donkey Kong 3	1984	Yes	No	No
Dr. Mario	1990	No	Yes	Yes
Excitebike	1984	Yes	No	Yes
Golf	1984	Yes	No	No
Ice Climber	1985	Yes	No	No
Ice Hockey	1988	No	Yes	No
Kid Icarus	1986	No	Yes	Yes
Kirby's Adventure	1993	No	Yes	Yes
The Legend of Zelda	1986	Yes	No	Yes
Mario Bros.	1983	Yes	No	Yes
Metroid	1986	No	Yes	Yes
NES Open Tournament Golf	1991	No	Yes	No
Pinball	1984	Yes	No	No
Punch-Out!!	1987	No	Yes	Yes
Super Mario Bros.	1985	Yes	No	Yes
Super Mario Bros.: The Lost Levels	1986	No	Yes	Yes
Super Mario Bros. 2	1988	No	Yes	Yes
Super Mario Bros. 3	1988	No	Yes	Yes
Tennis	1984	Yes	No	No
Urban Champion	1984	Yes	No	No
Wario's Woods	1994	No	Yes	No
Wrecking Crew	1985	Yes	No	No
Zelda II: The Adventure of Link	1987	No	Yes	Yes

== Development ==
NES Remix Pack compilation box art (left) and Ultimate NES Remix box art

According to an IGN interview, the game started as a pet project by Nintendo EAD Tokyo's Koichi Hayashida, after having directed Super Mario 3D Land. With approval from group manager and producer Yoshiaki Koizumi, Hayashida developed the first 100 challenges of NES Remix by himself. Also co-directing Super Mario 3D World at the time, Hayashida was later assisted by three additional members of EAD Tokyo. Nintendo additionally hired Indieszero to help finish the game.

Hayashida stated that he designed NES Remix partly out of desire to play NES games at work; he did not get to play many of these games as a child, and he considered the game an opportunity to make up for lost time. Hayashida was also inspired to break the games up into minigames for similar reasons, because as an adult he did not have as much time as he did as a child, but he still wanted to play later "scenes" in the games.

Hayashida expressed his belief that NES Remix should be completely authentic to its vintage roots. To this end, the compilation is based entirely on accurate emulation of the NES's hardware and on the original game software. This includes hardware glitches such as frame rate slowdown when too many characters are on the screen, and software bugs. Hayashida explained that these were intricate parts of the original and directly affect the difficulty and so they were not changed. Hayashida also spoke similarly about the controls; even if they were not considered ideal, he understood that they had been conceived that way for a reason and so they were unaltered for NES Remix.

In an interview with gaming website IGN, Hayashida revealed that NES Remix would have been more difficult to develop for the Nintendo 3DS handheld system, adding that the development team required "some more machine power" in order to achieve the desired result at that time. Hayashida also noted that his familiarity with the Wii U architecture, having resulted from his work on Super Mario 3D World, lent itself well to the early development of NES Remix. However, a version of the game for the Nintendo 3DS, known as Ultimate NES Remix, was eventually announced.

== Reception ==
NES Remix

Aggregate score
Aggregator	Score
Metacritic	71/100

Review scores
Publication	Score
Destructoid	7.5/10
Edge	6/10
Eurogamer	7/10
Game Informer	6.5/10
GameRevolution	3.5/5
GameSpot	6/10
GamesTM	7/10
IGN	8/10
Joystiq	1.5/5
Nintendo Life	9/10; Pack: 7/10
Nintendo World Report	9/10
Official Nintendo Magazine	74%
Polygon	8/10
USgamer	4.5/5

NES Remix 2

Aggregate score
Aggregator	Score
Metacritic	73/100

Review scores
Publication	Score
Destructoid	8/10
Edge	7/10
Game Informer	7/10
GameRevolution	4/5
GameSpot	7/10
GamesTM	7/10
IGN	7.7/10
Joystiq	3.5/5
Nintendo Life	8/10; Pack: 7/10
Nintendo World Report	8.5/10
Official Nintendo Magazine	82%
Polygon	8/10
Shacknews	7/10
USgamer	4/5

Ultimate NES Remix

Aggregate score
Aggregator	Score
Metacritic	69/100

Review scores
Publication	Score
GameSpot	7/10
Nintendo Life	7/10
Nintendo World Report	7.5/10
Pocket Gamer	3/5

IGN rated NES Remix at 8.0 out of 10.0. While they did find this first compilation enjoyable, they criticized the lack of multiplayer functionality and online leaderboards as a "startling oversight", and wished that a greater quantity and quality of titles had been included. They suggested that Nintendo could have more fundamentally altered certain vintage games, such as by improving upon the "frustrating" play control of the vintage Ice Climber, Tennis, or Clu Clu Land, or by making Pinball more "fun".

IGN's follow-up review for NES Remix 2 is also overall positive, rating it at 7.7 out of 10.0. While noting this sequel's fulfillment of their original request for leaderboards and for a superior selection of games, IGN says about the remix portion of the collection that "better games don't necessarily make for better remixes". They specifically commend Nintendo's "great job of revealing the overlooked, clever design" of the Japanese Super Mario Bros. 2, and summarily praise the overall collection by "officially demanding more". GameSpot assigns a 7.0 out of 10.0, calling NES Remix 2 "a delightful experience" with "more than enough content to keep you busy ... for a good while".

== Successor ==
On July 18, 2024, Nintendo World Championships: NES Edition, which features similar gameplay, was released. It has been described as a spiritual successor to NES Remix.
