= Nonogram =

Logic puzzle forming a picture in a grid

A completed nonogram of the letter "W" from the Wikipedia logo

Nonograms, also known as Hanjie, Paint by Numbers, Griddlers, Pic-a-Pix, and Picross, are picture logic puzzles in which cells in a grid must be colored or left blank according to numbers at the edges of the grid to reveal a hidden picture. In this puzzle, the numbers are a form of discrete tomography that measures how many unbroken lines of filled-in squares there are in any given row or column. For example, a clue of "4 8 3" would mean there are sets of four, eight, and three filled squares, in that order, with at least one blank square between successive sets.

These puzzles are often black and white — describing a binary image — but they can also be colored. If colored, the number clues are also colored to indicate the color of the squares. Two differently colored numbers may or may not have a space in between them. For example, a black four followed by a red two could mean four black boxes, some empty spaces, and two red boxes, or it could simply mean four black boxes followed immediately by two red ones. Nonograms have no theoretical limits on size, and are not restricted to square layouts.

Nonograms were named after Non Ishida, one of the two inventors of the puzzle.

== History ==
In 1987, Non Ishida, a Japanese graphics editor, won a competition in Tokyo by designing grid pictures using skyscraper lights that were turned on or off. This led her to the idea of a puzzle based around filling in certain squares in a grid. Coincidentally, a professional Japanese puzzler named Tetsuya Nishio invented the same puzzles independently, and published them in another magazine. At this time, nonograms were also called picture-forming logic puzzles.

In 1988, Non Ishida published three picture grid puzzles in Japan under the name of "Window Art Puzzles". Ishida showed her puzzles to James Dalgety, a puzzle collector in the United Kingdom, who liked the puzzles and offered to help publish her work worldwide. Dalgety coined the name "nonogram" as a mashup of "Non" from their creator's name, and "gram" from the word "diagram".

=== Print publishing ===
Dalgety made a deal with The Sunday Telegraph to publish Ishida's nonograms on a weekly basis starting in 1990. By 1993, the first book of nonograms was published by Non Ishida in Japan. The Sunday Telegraph published a dedicated puzzle book titled the "Book of Nonograms". Nonograms were also published in Sweden, the United States (originally by Games magazine), South Africa and other countries. The Sunday Telegraph ran a competition in 1998 to choose a new name for their puzzles. "Griddlers" was the winning name that readers chose. In 1993, Ishida published the "Book of Nonograms".

=== Electronic puzzles ===
Nonogram puzzles were implemented by 1995 on hand-held electronic toys such as Game Boy and on other plastic puzzle toys. Nintendo picked up on this puzzle fad, claiming the trademark for the name Picross (short for "picture crossword") for their own use, and released two nonogram titles for the Game Boy and nine for the Super Famicom (eight of which were released in two-month intervals for the Nintendo Power Super Famicom Cartridge Writer as the NP series) in Japan. Only one of these, Mario's Picross for the Game Boy, was released outside Japan. Nintendo's Picross titles are primarily developed by Jupiter Corporation, who also released Picross DS on the Nintendo DS, nine titles in the Picross e series for the Nintendo 3DS, and nine titles in the Picross S series for the Nintendo Switch. They have also produced several Picross titles featuring licensed properties, including Pokémon, Sanrio characters, and Doraemon.

Increased popularity in Japan launched new publishers, and by then, there were several monthly magazines, some of which contained up to 100 puzzles. The Japanese arcade game Logic Pro was released by Deniam Corp in 1996, with a sequel released the following year. UK games developer Jagex released a nonogram puzzle in 2011 as part of their annual Halloween event for their role-playing game, Runescape. In 2013, Casual Labs released a mobile version of these puzzles called Paint it Back with the theme of restoring an art gallery. Released early in 2017, Pictopix has been presented as a worthy heir to Picross on PC by Rock, Paper, Shotgun. In particular, the game enables players to share their creations.

=== Today ===
Nonograms have been published by Sanoma Uitgevers in the Netherlands, Puzzler Media (formerly British European Associated Publishers) in the UK and Nikui Rosh Puzzles in Israel. Magazines with nonogram puzzles are published in the US, UK, Germany, Netherlands, Italy, Hungary, Finland, the Czech Republic, Slovakia, Russia, Ukraine, and many other countries.

Numerous names have been developed for these puzzles, typically from names given by various publications or from computer programs that offer these puzzles. Including Griddlers, such names include CrossPix, Descarte's Enigma, FigurePic, IllustLogic, Oekaki-Logic, Paint by Numbers, PictureLogic, and StarPic. Although the name is trademarked by Nintendo, Picross has also been used to refer to nonogram puzzles.

== Example ==
Empty nonogram
2	2
0	9	9	2	2	4	4	0
0
4
6
2	2
2	2
6
4
2
2
2
0

Solved nonogram
2	2
0	9	9	2	2	4	4	0
0
4
6
2	2
2	2
6
4
2
2
2
0

== Nonograms in computing ==
Deciding whether a nonogram puzzle has a solution is an NP-complete problem. This places the related problem of constructing a solution (or demonstrating that no solution exists) for a given puzzle into the category of NP-hard problems, meaning that there is no polynomial time algorithm that solves all nonogram puzzles unless P = NP.

However, certain classes of puzzles, such as those in which each row or column has only one block of cells and all cells are connected, may be solved in polynomial time by transforming the problem into an instance of 2-satisfiability.

== Software solvers ==
An extensive comparison and discussion of nonogram solving algorithms is found at the WebPBN site (Web Paint-By-Number). A nonogram solver written in C++ and published in the journal Pattern Recognition solves lines in quadratic time at most.

== Video games ==
Nintendo has published several nonogram video games using the name "Picross" (ピクロス, Pikurosu). The Game Boy game Mario's Picross was initially released in Japan on March 14, 1995 to decent success. However, the game failed to become a hit in the U.S. market, despite a heavy advertising campaign by Nintendo. The game is of an escalating difficulty, with successive puzzle levels containing larger puzzles. Each puzzle has a limited amount of time to be cleared. Hints (line clears) may be requested at a time penalty, and mistakes made earn time penalties as well (the amount increasing for each mistake). Picross 2 was released later for Game Boy and Mario's Super Picross for the Super Famicom, neither of which were translated for the U.S. market (Mario's Super Picross was, however, later released on the Wii Virtual Console's PAL service on September 14, 2007, as part of its Hanabi Festival, as well as on the Nintendo Switch Online service worldwide on September 23rd, 2020). Both games introduced Wario's Picross as well, featuring Mario's nemesis in the role. These rounds vary by removing the hint function, and mistakes are not penalized — at the price that mistakes are not even revealed. These rounds can only be cleared when all correct boxes are marked, with no mistakes. The time limit was also removed. Nintendo also released eight Picross volumes on the Japanese Nintendo Power peripheral in Japan, called NP Picross, each with a new set of puzzles, including puzzles based around various Nintendo characters, such as Mario, The Legend of Zelda, and Pokémon.

Nintendo has released Picross DS for the Nintendo DS portable system in 2007. It contains several stages of varying difficulty, from 5x5 grids to 25x20 grids. Normal mode tells players if they made an error (with a time penalty) and free mode does not. A hint is available before starting the puzzle in all modes; the game reveals a complete row and column at random. Additional puzzles were available through Nintendo Wi-Fi Connection; some of the original Mario's Picross puzzles were available. However, the service was shut down on 20 May 2014. Nintendo made new releases available bi-weekly. Picross DS was released in Europe and Australia on 11 May 2007 and in the United States on July 30, 2007 and has been received well by critics, including Craig Harris, Jessica Wadleigh and Dave McCarthy labelling the game "Addictive". A 3D version of the game, titled Picross 3D, was also released for the DS in Japan in 2009 and internationally in 2010. A sequel, Picross 3D: Round 2, was released for the Nintendo 3DS in 2015. Another downloadable version of the game was released for Nintendo 3DS's Nintendo eShop, called Picross e, Picross e2, and Picross e3 released in 2013, with Picross e4 released in 2014. Nintendo has also released a Pokémon spinoff on December 7, 2015 in the form of the freemium game of Pokémon Picross for Nintendo 3DS. My Nintendo Picross: The Legend of Zelda: Twilight Princess was released for Nintendo 3DS on March 31, 2016, exclusively as a premium reward for My Nintendo.

Other companies have also released nonogram video games, such as Falcross on iOS, Across-Stitch by Knitwit Studios on Microsoft Windows and Apple macOS, and the Color Cross series of games by Little Worlds Studio on the Nintendo DS, Microsoft Windows, and iOS. In addition, nonogram puzzles have appeared in non-nonogram puzzle games, such as in Deadly Rooms of Death's fifth installment, The Second Sky. In it, nonogram puzzles (referred to as "Picross puzzles") representing in-game objects are optional, unlockable puzzles late into the game that can be played in the level "The Central Station", and solving them unlocks bonus levels in the game. In 2018, Konami released a game titled Pixel Puzzle Collection, or Picroji Puzzle (ピクロジパズル), featuring classic Konami characters and sprites.

== Other picture logic puzzles ==
Pentomino paint-by-numbers is a variant in which the twelve pentomino shapes must be placed in the grid, without touching each other (even diagonally).

Triddlers are an offshoot that uses triangle shapes instead of squares.

Paint by pairs or Link-a-Pix consists of a grid, with numbers filling some squares; pairs of numbers must be located correctly and connected with a line filling a total of squares equal to that number. There is only one unique way to link all the squares in a properly-constructed puzzle. When completed, the squares that have lines are filled; the contrast with the blank squares reveals the picture. (As above, colored versions exist that involving matching numbers of the same color.)

Fill-a-Pix also uses a grid with numbers within. In this format, each number indicates how many of the squares immediately surrounding it, and itself, will be filled. A square marked "9," for example, will have all eight surrounding squares and itself filled. If it is marked "0" those squares are all blank.

Maze-a-Pix uses a maze in a standard grid. When the single correct route from beginning to end is located, each 'square' of the solution is filled in (alternatively, all non-solution squares are filled in) to create the picture.

Tile Paint is another type of picture logic puzzle by Nikoli. It works like regular nonograms except that it only specifies the total number of squares in each row or column that will be filled in and irregular sections within the grid have borders around them that indicate that, if one of the squares within it is filled in, all of them must be filled in.
