= Picross e =

- Cover art for the first Picross e game (2011)
- Genre: Puzzle
- Developer: Jupiter
- Publisher: Jupiter
- Platform: Nintendo 3DS
- First release: Picross e 27 July 2011
- Latest release: Picross e9 8 August 2018

Picross e is a series of nonogram puzzle video games developed and published by Jupiter for the Nintendo 3DS handheld game console. It is the successor to Jupiter's Nintendo-published Picross games including the Mario's Picross series and Picross DS. It was later succeeded by the Picross S series.

On 29 February 2024, a year after the discontinuation of the Nintendo 3DS's Nintendo eShop, Jupiter released Picross S+, a compilation of every puzzle previously included in the Picross e series, with the first game's puzzles being included in the base game, and the rest being sold as separate downloadable content.

== Games ==
Games and their Dates of Release
Game	Date of Release		
Game	Japan	Europe	North America
Picross e	27 July 2011	6 September 2012	13 June 2013
Picross e2	28 December 2011	24 January 2013	25 July 2013
Picross e3	12 June 2013	14 November 2013	3 October 2013
Picross e4	20 November 2013	22 May 2014	1 May 2014
Picross e5	11 June 2014	13 November 2014	
Picross e6	24 December 2014	30 July 2015	6 August 2015
Picross e7	27 April 2016	22 December 2016	5 December 2016
Picross e8	20 December 2017	18 January 2018	21 December 2017
Picross e9	8 August 2018	Unreleased	Unreleased

The puzzles of the Picross e series were later re-released as part of Picross S+ for Nintendo Switch.

== Spin-offs ==
Jupiter used the mechanics and UI of their Picross e games as the basis for a number of licensed spin-off games:

Games and their Dates of Release
Game	Date of Release		
Game	Japan	Europe	North America
Club Nintendo Picross	13 September 2012	Unreleased	Unreleased
Club Nintendo Picross Plus	9 October 2013	Unreleased	Unreleased
Pokémon Picross	2 December 2015	3 December 2015	3 December 2015
My Nintendo Picross: The Legend of Zelda: Twilight Princess	17 March 2016	31 March 2016	31 March 2016
Pictlogica Final Fantasy	12 July 2017	Unreleased	Unreleased
Sanrio Characters Picross	25 April 2018	28 June 2018	19 July 2018

== Reception ==
Aggregate review scores
Game	Metacritic
Picross e	73/100
Picross e2	68/100
Picross e3	66/100
Picross e4	68/100
Picross e5	70/100
Picross e6	72/100

Reception towards the series from professional critics has been "average" according to aggregate review website Metacritic and GameRankings.

== See also ==
- Picross, the puzzle series that Picross e is a part of;
- Picross S, the successor to the Picross e series, for the Nintendo Switch;
- Nonogram, the puzzle genre featured in the Picross series.
