= Picross DS =

2007 video game

- European box art
- Developer: Jupiter
- Publisher: Nintendo
- Director: Norichika Meguro; Masaki Tawara
- Producers: Makoto Nakayama; Hitoshi Yamagami
- Composers: Nobuhiro Ōuchi; Masashi Sugiyama; Ayako Yamaguchi
- Platform: Nintendo DS
- Release: JP: January 25, 2007; EU: May 11, 2007; AU: June 7, 2007; NA: July 30, 2007
- Genre: Puzzle
- Modes: Single player, multiplayer

Picross DS (ピクロスDS) is a puzzle video game developed by Jupiter and published by Nintendo for the Nintendo DS handheld video game console. It is the second game in the Picross series to be released by Nintendo in Europe and North America after Mario's Picross suffered a commercial failure in regions outside Japan, where many games in the series have been released for several Nintendo consoles. Like other games in the Picross series, it presents the player with a series of nonogram logic puzzles to solve. It was first released in Japan, and was later released in North America, Europe and Australia.

== Gameplay ==
The player deciphering the numbers to create the pattern required

Gameplay follows traditional nonogram rules, where players use logic to mark each square as full or empty, eventually revealing an unknown picture. Additional modes allow players to create their own puzzles and send them to friends, download classic puzzles and compete in speed competitions with friends or random rivals via the Nintendo Wi-Fi Connection, download classic nonogram puzzles from previous titles and complete up to five timed daily challenges.

In all modes except Daily and Online Challenge, the player is given the opportunity to receive a "hint" which reveals one randomly selected row and column, which does not impact the player's time. Also, three types of background music can be selected (except for Classic puzzles and the unlockable level 11 "extra" puzzles), or the music can be turned off.

=== Game modes ===
In Normal mode, the player is informed if they mark a square that should be unmarked. The first mistake incurs a time penalty of two minutes, the second mistake four minutes, and each following mistake eight minutes.

Initially, the player can choose from an "easy mode" of 5×5 and 10×10 puzzles, and Levels 1–4 of 10×10 and 15×15 puzzles. As the player completes puzzles in the standard levels, levels 5–10 and an extra level can be unlocked, with puzzles up to 25×20 in size. To unlock the extra level, the puzzles in all ten levels must be completed with a time of less than one hour for each, including penalties.

Each level contains 15 puzzles. After completing five puzzles in each level, one of three timed mini-games is unlocked:

- Catch: 1×1 squares float around the grid. Tapping them all with the stylus clears this mode.
- Sketch: The top screen displays a picture, which must be copied into the grid on the bottom screen.
- Hit: Many squares appear and disappear quickly. Once a certain number are tapped, this mode is cleared.

Minigames can be played multiple times to improve score, but do not have any bearing on unlocking new levels. They become more difficult in higher levels.

The three types of music available in Normal mode are jazz, reggae and bossa nova.

In Free mode, the player is not informed of mistakes, and the puzzles are generally more difficult to complete. To offset this, a Try it Out mode is available in which an overlay can be constructed to test various solutions. When finished with this mode, the player can delete it or apply the overlay.

The Free mode minigames are the same as in Normal Mode but are generally more difficult.

The three types of music available in Free Mode are rock, house and ambient.

My Picross contains Original and Classic puzzles. Original puzzles are those that are created by the player or downloaded from friends in local or online wireless modes. Original puzzles can be classified as Normal or Free mode, and are given an automatically generated one to four star rating based on the puzzle's difficulty as assessed by the game. When these puzzles are played, the music selections are the same as in the regular Normal and Free modes depending on how the Original puzzle is classified.

Classic puzzles are downloaded from the Nintendo Wi-Fi Connection. Downloadable puzzle packs will contain a variety of puzzles from classic Nintendo Picross titles; currently, puzzle packs from Mario's Picross, and the Picross NP series, are available in Europe and North America. As of November 21, 2007, twelve puzzle packs are currently available in North America, with two packs having been released biweekly starting on September 3, 2007. In Europe, only two packs have been released so far. In the classic mode, there is only one choice of music, which is not the same as any of the other modes but is different for Classic Normal mode and a Classic Free mode puzzles. The classic mode puzzles can be deleted at any time to make room for additional puzzles (ten packs can be held in memory at a time).

Daily Picross contains up to five challenges, all on a 7×7 board with Normal mode rules. Mistakes in this mode incur a five-second penalty. Once a challenge is completed, the game time is recorded, graphed and assigned a letter grade, with A being an average time under 30 seconds. When other modes are unlocked, the grades are averaged together to obtain an overall grade, with five A grades resulting in the highest overall grade of S.

The five challenges available in Daily Picross mode:

- Nonstop Time Attack mode is initially available, which is a fast-paced series of five puzzles in rapid succession.
- No X Marks mode is identical to Nonstop Time Attack, but the X mark, which is used to mark squares that the player thinks cannot contain a filled mark, cannot be used. This mode is available after playing Daily Picross for three (not necessarily consecutive) days.
- Error Search mode shows the player five partially completed puzzles, with some squares needing a fill and some of the filled squares erroneously filled. On the top screen, the player is shown how many squares must be filled and how many erroneous squares need to be cleared before the puzzle is complete. If a filled square is cleared that should not be, no penalty is incurred, but if a square is filled that should not be, it incurs a time penalty similar to the Nonstop Time Attack mode. This mode is available after playing Daily Picross for seven days.
- Memory mode gives the player one puzzle to solve. For 20 seconds, the numerical clues on the edges of the grid are shown. After these disappear, the player is free to complete the puzzle. After various time intervals, one clue in one row or column is revealed until all of them are shown or the puzzle is complete. This mode is available after playing Daily Picross for twelve days.
- Secret mode is similar to Nonstop Time Attack in that a 7×7 grid must be completed and time penalties are possible; however, three of the numerical clues are replaced with an X mark. Three numbers are placed on the top screen; one of each of these are the true clue, and must be determined by the player by filling out the rest of the puzzle. Only one puzzle needs to be completed to finish this challenge. This mode is available after playing Daily Picross for twenty days.

Online challenges consist of two 10×10 puzzles in a row. If a mistake is made, the game grid is frozen for five seconds while the other player is allowed to continue. Players cannot see the other player's screen, but are shown a progress bar that estimates how close the other player is to completing the puzzles. The bar quivers when the opponent has been penalized for making a mistake. The first player to complete both puzzles wins. This mode may be played against friends with a friend code, or with a randomly selected challenger.

== Reception ==
Reception

Aggregate scores
Aggregator	Score
GameRankings	83.04%
Metacritic	83/100

Review scores
Publication	Score
Eurogamer	8/10
GameRevolution	3.5/5
GameSpot	8/10
GameSpy	4.5/5
GameZone	9/10
IGN	9/10
Nintendo Life	9/10
Nintendo World Report	8/10
CNET	7.0/10
Cubed3	8/10

Dan Ryckert of Lawrence.com gave Picross DS a 9.4 out of 10 saying that "I couldn't have been more pleasantly surprised with Picross DS. It ranks up there with the system's elite in terms of "pick up and play" gameplay. With so much content and such a great price, you'd be a fool not to add this to your DS library." Boys' Life gave the game 8 out of 10 praising fun and challenging puzzles but also criticized it for a short length and zero replayability.

== See also ==
- Picross, the series of nonogram video games by Nintendo.
- Picross 3D, a Picross series game developed by Nintendo and HAL Laboratory for the Nintendo DS.
- Picross e, Jupiter's follow-up series for the Nintendo 3DS.
- Picross S, another of Jupiter's follow-up series for the Nintendo Switch.
