= Pokémon Pinball: Ruby & Sapphire =

2003 video game

- North American box art for Pokémon Pinball: Ruby & Sapphire
- Developer: Jupiter
- Publishers: JP: The Pokémon Company; WW: Nintendo
- Series: Pokémon
- Platform: Game Boy Advance
- Release: JP: August 1, 2003; NA: August 25, 2003; AU: September 26, 2003; UK: November 14, 2003
- Genre: Pinball
- Mode: Single player

Pokémon Pinball: Ruby & Sapphire (Note: Japanese: ポケモンピンボール ルビー&サファイア, Hepburn: Pokemon Pinbōru Rubī & Safaia) is a 2003 pinball game developed by Jupiter and published by The Pokémon Company and Nintendo for the Game Boy Advance handheld game console. It was first revealed at E3 2003. The North American release was done to coincide with the fifth anniversary of the North American release of Pokémon Red and Blue. It is based on Pokémon Ruby and Sapphire, and is a sequel to Pokémon Pinball for the Game Boy Color. In some ways, it plays like a traditional pinball game, where the objective is to get a high score by keeping the ball in play as long as possible and hitting bumpers. In keeping with the theme of Pokémon, it features Pokémon collection, where while the players play pinball, they must also capture the eponymous creatures.

Ruby & Sapphire has received generally positive reception. It was well-received when it was revealed at E3 by publications such as IGN and GameSpy. Its release was similarly well received, with Metacritic giving it an aggregate score of 82/100. It has sold over 1 million copies worldwide, and has received significant praise from review outlets such as Nintendo Power, GamePro, and IGN, the latter awarding it the Game Boy Advance Game of the Month award for August 2003. In spite of the positive reception, some reviewers found it to be an inferior pinball experience, such as TechTV and The Guardian, though felt that Pokémon fans would enjoy it.

== Gameplay ==
Pokémon Pinball: Ruby & Sapphire plays similarly to traditional pinball games, using a similar engine to its predecessor, Pokémon Pinball. It features two boards, each themed on either Pokémon Ruby or Sapphire. They have similar layouts, though they feature some differences, the Sapphire table being noted as slightly more annoying due to its setup. The player launches a ball onto the board, at which point it descends towards the bottom of said board. The objective is to ensure that the ball is not lost via the drain. Players must utilize a pair of flippers located right above the drain to hit the ball upward, keeping it from falling for as long as possible. There are two outlanes located on either end of the board where the ball may fall, rendering players helpless. A Pikachu sits at either side of the board, and if players have filled its meter, it serves as a kickback, shooting the ball out of this outlane. The player can also shoot the ball into a mart, from which a power-up can be purchased to cause a Pichu to appear, allowing both outlanes to be blocked. This can assist the player in activating the four circles that sit in both the side slots and flipper paths, shown here spelling out the word 'hole'. Consequently, a gravity field appears in the central hole that starts a minigame which resembles a slot machine. In the blue field the player is able to utilize a Zigzagoon (shown here on the right side of the board) so that it can pounce on the selected tile and obtain the result. After finishing the Rayquaza bonus stage, a new Start Slot tile appears, which is simply labeled "Arrival", signifying the arrival of a Jirachi. Activating this tile results in a bonus mode similar to Catch 'Em Mode, where the player only has thirty seconds to catch Jirachi. This is the only way to add Jirachi to the Pokédex.

Gameplay of Pokémon Pinball: Ruby & Sapphire, in the Catch 'Em Mode.

As players hit various objects around the field, their score goes up. At certain scores, players gain a new ball. If the ball falls through the drain, that round is over. The player's scores are tallied, and the player receives bonuses for their achievements. The game features a Ball Saver, which returns the ball to the launcher if it is lost in the drain within the first moments of the round. The Ball Saver icons are Legendary Pokemon Latias and Latios, which are illuminated while Ball Saver is still active. The aforementioned mart can provide boosts for players, one such that adds a Ball Saver. Coins are collected through various means and are used to purchase items from this shop. If all balls are lost, the game is over. The other objective of the game is to complete the Pokédex, similar to other Pokémon titles. There are four primary modes - Catch 'Em Mode, Egg Mode, Evolution Mode, and Travel Mode. These modes are typically activated by going through a certain path on the board three times, and then entering an area on the board, such as the Sharpedo, which will activate Catch 'Em Mode.

In the Catch 'Em Mode, players must reveal a silhouette of a Pokémon by hitting bumpers. Once it is revealed, players must hit the Pokémon that appears three times with the ball as it sits in one spot before the time runs out. Egg Mode is a similar concept, though the baby Pokémon roam around the board as opposed to standard Pokémon, which stand still. As opposed to being timed, players must capture it before it returns from whence it came. Evolution Mode is also similar, requiring players to hit all of the evolution item markers in order to evolve their Pokémon that they have caught or hatched. These include several traditional means of evolution in the Pokémon series, such as stones and experience points. Lastly, Travel Mode allows players to leave the current location on their pinball board, allowing them to capture more kinds of Pokémon not found in the current area. Ruby & Sapphire featured additional bonus modes that often diverge from the standard gameplay. These modes sometimes feature rare Pokémon such as Groudon, Kyogre, and Rayquaza, and take place on separate fields. Outside of the gameplay, players may also view the Pokémon they have caught, listen to sound effects and music from the game, and view their high scores for each board.

== Release ==
Pokémon Pinball: Ruby & Sapphire was first revealed at E3 2003 for the Game Boy Advance. It was also shown at the 2003 Games Convention in Leipzig, Germany, as well as at the European Computer Trade Show in London, England. Developed by Jupiter and published by Nintendo. It is based on Pokémon Ruby and Sapphire, and features Pokémon available in those games. It was first released in Japan on August 1, 2003, and in North America on August 25 of the same year. The North American date coincided with the five-year anniversary of Pokémon Red and Blue's North American release. It was released in Australia on September 26, 2003, and in the United Kingdom two months later on November 14. A Nintendo eShop version for the Wii U was released on January 1, 2015.

== Reception ==
=== Pre-release reception ===
Before its release, Pokémon Pinball Ruby & Sapphire received generally positive impressions from critics. After a play test by Anoop Gantayat of IGN, he felt that fans of the series would enjoy it. He also praised the visuals, calling them "bright, colorful, and happy". However, he bemoaned the lack of e-Reader support, a feature common in Game Boy Advance games at the time. Craig Harris, also from IGN, found it to be a fun game, anticipating its release. IGN also included it in a list of the 10 big Game Boy Advance games of 2003. GameSpy described it as "much more than a pinball game", describing its gameplay mechanics as "unique".

=== Critical reception ===
Reception

Aggregate score
Aggregator	Score
Metacritic	82/100

Review scores
Publication	Score
Edge	7/10
Electronic Gaming Monthly	8.67/10
Eurogamer	8/10
Game Informer	8.5/10
GamePro	8/10
GameSpot	7.3/10
GameSpy	4/5
GamesTM	8/10
IGN	8.8/10
Nintendo Power	4.5/5

Pokémon Pinball: Ruby & Sapphire has been met with generally positive reception. The News Tribune's Bill Hutchens called it "addictive", GamesRadar's Carolyn Gudmundson gave it praise, while staff for Nintendo Power praised it for not being a simple "makeover" of its predecessor. They particularly enjoyed how the gameplay evolved and how the pinball tables became more "lively." However, GameSpot's Jeff Gerstmann felt it was too similar to the original and easier than it too, though he still found it entertaining. Denver Post's David Thomas called it "one of the most enjoyable pinball experiences", citing the Pokémon brand for why the game is so popular. Electronic Gaming Monthly praised the pinball table designs for their incorporation of Pokémon themes, noting that everything, save for the flippers, has a Pokémon theme.

GMR Magazine praised the combination of the Pokémon franchise with pinball gameplay, saying that the combination leads to "good times". While IGN's Craig Harris praised Ruby & Sapphire as the greatest pinball game for the Game Boy Advance, he noted that the Sapphire-themed board was slightly more annoying than the Ruby-themed one. He awarded it an "Editors Choice" award. Lucas M. Thomas, a fellow member of IGN, agreed with Harris, going further in calling it one of the greatest portable pinball games ever. He added that it had more fun and playability than most Game Boy Advance titles. It was ultimately awarded Game of the Month from IGN in August 2003, winning over Mortal Kombat: Tournament Edition. IGN praised Ruby & Sapphire as being one of the best pinball games on the Game Boy Advance, hoping that Nintendo makes a sequel to this.

Edge commented that while this is not a conventional pinball game, citing a lack of "well-designed skillshots and a challenging layout", the Pokémon series was never noted for its conventionality. 1UP.com praised Ruby & Sapphire, noting that while they were not as interested in the Pokémon series, Ruby & Sapphire was one of their most anticipated games of the summer. They add that Ruby & Sapphire improves on the original in "just about every way". GameNOW compared Ruby & Sapphire to the WarioWare, Inc. series, praising it as a "perfect handheld game" and "instantly playable". The Guardian's Rhianna Pratchett praised Ruby & Sapphire for being good for pinball novices and Pokémon players, but criticized its lack of deeper pinball mechanics such as multi-balls and skill shots. She also criticized the lack of variety in pinball boards, commenting that the two boards were very similar.

TechTV criticized it as being less "addictive or diverse as the great pinball videogames", though noted it to be fun for those looking for a Pokémon title. Game Informer praised its ball physics and controls, calling them "dead on". GameSpy's Darryl Vassar gave similar praise, describing the game as a "blast". He added that it had surprising depth. GamePro's "Dan Elektro" commented that Ruby & Sapphire would not interest those who do not have interest in the series, but fans of the series would enjoy its "unusually satisfying" gameplay. Games™ praised it for combining pinball and Pokémon, adding that the pinball gameplay would be more likely to draw those who are not fans of the series into playing Pokémon more so than the adventure games. Eurogamer's Martin Taylor commented that only the "most demanding of pinball wizards would be right to turn their nose up at Pokemon Pinball's charming slant on the genre." Computer and Video Games praised it for its broad appeal, commenting that it is "fast and fluid for the casual player, yet has collecting and evolving for the obsessive." Pokémon Pinball: Ruby & Sapphire has been compared to other pinball video games, including Mario Pinball Land, which GameAxis Unwired treats as an inferior to Ruby & Sapphire. Eurogamer described Ruby & Sapphire as a spiritual predecessor to Metroid Prime Pinball.

=== Sales ===
It ranked as number one best selling video game on Amazon.com's top 10 list for the week ending October 8, 2003. In the week ending September 4 in Japan, Ruby & Sapphire sold 19,400 copies, ranking sixth, with sales at that time at 170,247 copies total. The next week, it ranked 10th. It has sold more than one million copies worldwide.
