= Mario's Picross =

1995 video game

- European box art
- Developers: Jupiter; Ape Inc.
- Publisher: Nintendo
- Series: Mario
- Platform: Game Boy
- Release: JP: March 14, 1995; NA: March 16, 1995; AU: July 25, 1995; EU: July 27, 1995
- Genre: Puzzle
- Mode: Single-player

Mario's Picross (Note: Mario's Picross (マリオのピクロス, Mario no Pikurosu)) is a 1995 puzzle video game developed by Jupiter and Ape Inc. and published by Nintendo for the Game Boy. It is a compilation of nonogram logic puzzles, and is a part of Nintendo's Picross video game franchise. The game stars Mario who chisels away at puzzle grids to form pictures. The game initially received positive reviews, with reviewers citing its length and addictive nature as a positive, but its grid sizes and absence of typical Mario elements as a negative.

Although the game sold well in Japan, it sold poorly in English-speaking regions. As a result of this, the game was followed by two sequels, Mario's Super Picross and Picross 2, released only in Japan. The next game in the Picross franchise published by Nintendo to be released in English-speaking regions would be Picross DS in 2007, twelve years later. Due to its limited sales, the game is somewhat of a cult classic. The game was also available on the Nintendo 3DS through its Virtual Console service. The game was also later added to the Nintendo Classics service on March 7, 2025.

== Gameplay ==
An example of a 15 by 15 Kinoko puzzle. The fifth row down is completed as it has a sequence of two, four, one and two chiseled spaces in it, all with a number of blank spaces in between them, as the numbers beside the row state.

In Mario's Picross, the player is presented with a puzzle grid (either 5 by 5, 10 by 10 or 15 by 15 spaces in size, depending on the difficulty chosen) that they must chisel at in accordance with the numerical hints provided on the upper and left-hand edges of the grid in order to reveal a picture. In addition to the ability to chisel spaces, the player is also able to mark spaces with a cross to signify that the space is not meant to be chiseled. The numbers present outside the grid tell the player how many spaces should be chiseled within the row or column it is next to; if a single number is present on the row or column, there is that number of required chiseled spaces within said row or column, while if more than one number is present on the row or column, there are those numbers of required chiseled spaces, but separated by an undetermined amount of blank spaces. The player must use these numerical hints to fill in the grid both vertically and horizontally. Similar to a crossword, when a row or column is filled in, it is able to give hints as to the nature of the rows or columns it intercepts.

The player is given thirty minutes to complete each puzzle. If the player incorrectly chisels a space, some of the remaining time is deducted; upon the player's first error, two minutes are deducted; upon the second, four minutes; upon the third, eight minutes. Mistakes succeeding the third continue deducting eight minutes. If the player runs out of time, Mario falls over, and the game is over. If the player finishes the puzzle, Mario makes a thumbs-up motion, and the final picture is shown, with a subtitle detailing what it is. Additionally, a "With Hint" option is available at the beginning of the puzzle. Choosing this will start a roulette with the numbers labelling the columns and rows. The player is able to semi-actively choose a row and a column to be pre-filled in. After a puzzle is complete, its time of completion is shown on the menu, as well as whether the player used the With Hint option.

Mario's Picross features a total of 256 puzzles, separated into four modes — "Easy Picross", "Kinoko", "Star" and "Time Trial" — with 64 in each. The Easy Picross, Kinoko and Star modes all follow the gameplay pattern aforementioned (increasing in difficulty), while Time Trial mode is untimed and does not show the player where they have made mistakes. If the player scores high enough, they will be able to insert their score by using their initials, much like an arcade game. Whilst the Easy Picross, Kinoko and Star modes are playable prior to beating the game, Time Trial mode is only playable when the other three modes have all been completed. The game also allows the player to select from a number of tracks to listen to while completing puzzles.

== Development and release ==
Mario's Picross was developed by Jupiter and Ape and was published worldwide by Nintendo. The game was created in an effort to capitalize on the popularity of puzzle games in Japan. Jupiter would go on to become the developer for the majority of the games in the Picross video game franchise. The game was released in Japan for the Game Boy on March 14, 1995. It was also re-released on the Nintendo 3DS Virtual Console in 2011 on 14 July in Europe, and in August for North America and Japan.

Upon the game's release, despite Nintendo's marketing through television commercials and Nintendo Power magazine, the game did not meet the market trends of English-speaking regions and failed there. The game, however, proved to be popular in Japan. Due to the failure of this game in English-speaking regions, future nonogram logic puzzles from Nintendo were not released in those regions until Picross DS in 2007. The success of Picross DS resulted in worldwide releases for the franchise, as well as releases for the Virtual Console on the Nintendo 3DS and the Nintendo Classics service. The game also became a reward for the Club Nintendo loyalty program.

== Reception ==
Reception

Aggregate score
Aggregator	Score
GameRankings	75.30%

Review scores
Publication	Score
Electronic Gaming Monthly	GB: 5/10, 5.5/10, 6/10, 4/10
Famitsu	GB: 9/10, 5/10, 7/10, 8/10
IGN	3DS: 8.5/10
Nintendo Life	3DS: 8/10
Official Nintendo Magazine	GB: 86/100; 3DS: 8/10
Pocket Gamer	3DS: 8/10
Player One	GB: 90%
Super Play	GB: 78%
Total!	GB: 80/100
VideoGames & Computer Entertainment	GB: 8/10

Mario's Picross received positive reviews upon its release. The four reviewers of Electronic Gaming Monthly criticized the game's focus on logic and reasoning instead of rapid button presses, saying it makes the game boring to play after the first few puzzles. GamePro gave it a more mixed review. They criticized the repetitive music and the fact that Mario does not appear in the main graphics, but acknowledged that the game is "undeniably addicting, especially if you love numbers". Marcel van Duyn of Nintendo Life cited the game's addictive nature, volume of puzzles and soundtrack in his review.

The reception of the Mario's Picross Virtual Console re-release, however, was more positive. Lucas M. Thomas for IGN looked on the game positively, specifically referencing its amount of puzzles as a strength. Mike Rose of Pocket Gamer stated that although the game has sometimes unintuitive controls and always has the Hint system default to 'yes', the game represents the Mario series well and is a workout for the brain. Andrew Brown of Nintendo World Report criticized the localization of the game and the game's attempt to fit on the small screen of the Game Boy, reasoning that Mario's Super Picross or Picross DS would be a better choice for first-time Picross franchise players. Chris Scullion of Official Nintendo Magazine praised the game's use of characters from the Super Mario series, although he felt that Mario's Picross would feel like a "slight step backwards" to those who had already played other games in the Picross franchise. A reviewer with Jeuxvideo.com stated that the game is a "blend of logic, drawing and Nintendo", rating the game well.

Despite a large advertising campaign by Nintendo the game failed to sell well in America and Europe, leading the game's sequels to be confined to Japan. As a result, the game is seen as something of a cult classic in English-speaking regions. The main criticisms aimed at the game was the size of the grids; due to the small size of the Game Boy screen, the game's puzzle grids are restricted to being just 15 by 15, when puzzles four times that size were common in other media. Game Informer ranked it as their 91st favorite game ever and their fifth favorite Game Boy game. Complex ranked the game as the 24th best Game Boy game in their list of the best Game Boy games, citing how it is a rewarding experience for those with inquisitive minds.

=== Legacy ===
Whilst the game's sales were lackluster in English-speaking regions, the game succeeded enough in Japan to spawn two Japan-exclusive sequels, Mario's Super Picross for the Super Famicom and Picross 2, a direct sequel to Mario's Picross, on the Game Boy. The continued success of these games in the Japan region saw Nintendo create the Picross NP series in 1999, a Japan-exclusive series of games meant to promote other, larger games or series. These games were meant for use with the Japan-only Nintendo Power peripheral for the Super Nintendo Entertainment System. There were eight instalments of this series, each one having a different theme; Pokémon, Yoshi's Story, Kirby, Star Fox 64, The Legend of Zelda: Ocarina of Time, Super Mario 64, Wario Land II and Donkey Kong Country, respectively. The series ran from 1999 to 2000.

The series had a hiatus until 2007, when Picross DS for the Nintendo DS was released worldwide. Picross DS was quite well-received in comparison to Mario's Picross upon its release. This success led to Nintendo's Picross franchise becoming a worldwide series, with games appearing on future iterations of Nintendo handhelds, including Picross 3D, a 3D re-imagining of traditional nonogram puzzles, the Picross e series, on Nintendo 3DS, and Picross S, on Nintendo Switch. Mario's Picross was re-released on the Nintendo 3DS Virtual Console on July 14, 2011. Being the original iteration of the series, other Mario video games have referenced the Picross franchise. Picross DS features downloadable puzzles taken from Mario's Picross. The explorer attire Mario wears both in-game and in promotional material makes a cameo appearance in Super Mario Odyssey as an unlockable costume Mario is able to wear.
