= Nintendo Power (cartridge) =

Peripheral for the Super Famicom and Game Boy

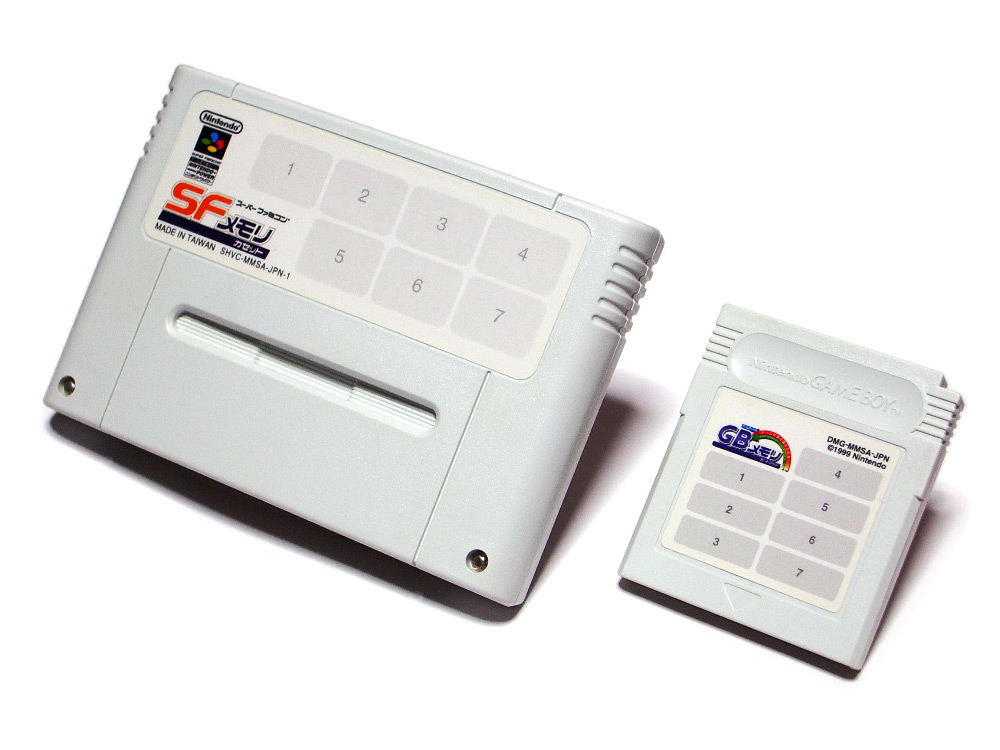
- Nintendo Power flash cartridges for Super Famicom (SF Memory Cassette) and Game Boy (GB Memory Cartridge)
- Developer: Nintendo
- Released: September 30, 1997
- Discontinued: February 28, 2007

Nintendo Power (Japanese: ニンテンドウパワー, Hepburn: Nintendō Pawā) was a video game distribution service for Super Famicom or Game Boy operated by Nintendo that ran exclusively in Japan from September 1997 until February 2007. The service allowed users to download Super Famicom or Game Boy titles onto a special flash memory cartridge for a lower price than that of a pre-written ROM cartridge.

At its launch, the service initially offered only Super Famicom titles. Game Boy titles began being offered on March 1, 2000. The service was ultimately discontinued on February 28, 2007.

== Background ==
=== Prior ventures ===
During the market lifespan of the Famicom, Nintendo developed the Disk System, a magnetic disk drive peripheral with expanded RAM which allowed players to use re-writable disk media called "disk cards" at Disk Writer kiosks. The system was relatively popular but suffered from issues of limited capacity. However, Nintendo did see a market for an economical re-writable medium due to the popularity of the Disk System.

Nintendo's first dynamic flash storage subsystem for the Super Famicom was the Satellaview, a peripheral released in 1995 that facilitated the delivery of a set of unique Super Famicom games via the St.GIGA satellite network.

=== Development and Planning ===
On October 17, 1996, a newly formed subsidiary of Square, DigiCube, announced a partnership with convenience store chains 7-Eleven, FamilyMart, Circle K, and Sunkus (Note: Both were later absorbed into FamilyMart) to sell video games, focused on PlayStation at launch. Within its first two and a half years, DigiCube reported over 14 million games sold (significantly more than other products DigiCube distributed) and a total profit of around two billion yen.

Just one month after Square's announcement, on November 14, Nintendo announced their plans to expand into convenience store distribution under the Game Kiosk business venture. Competing major chain Lawson sought to expand into video game sales as well. Following the launch of the Nintendo 64, Nintendo sought to position the Super Famicom as an entry-level game console, revitalize it with legacy games at a cheap price, and generate ongoing revenue. Since their goals aligned, Nintendo teamed up with Lawson to offer these game kiosks in Lawson stores, and thus planning and development began.

Adoption of a data rewrite system eliminated inventory, package production, and other overhead while still maintaining profits. Nintendo aimed to capitalize on the Super Famicom's massive domestic footprint of 17 million units with this endeavor.

At the time, the major game publishers viewed the used game market as a problem. They put pressure on the used game retailers to protect sales revenue, and argued that the used market infringed on their distribution rights. Since the availability of out-of-print titles relied entirely on the used market, this service allowed publishers and retailers to continue to bring in revenue on those titles.

== Service Launch ==
The service soft-launched with Super Famicom support alongside the soft-launch of Lawson’s in-store kiosk system, Loppi, in 100 stores across the greater Tokyo area on September 30, 1997. The service was launched nationwide on November 1, 1997. Support for the Game Boy was announced even before the venture began, but was ultimately launched on March 1, 2000.

Plans were made to expand into video game retailers, Toys "R" Us, and other locations as well. From August 1998 to February 1999, the service soft-launched in some Daiei (Note: Then parent company of Lawson), Tsutaya, Brut, and Wanpaku stores, but this did not lead to widespread expansion.

=== Game Boy Service Launch ===
The Game Boy rewritable cartridge service was originally planned to launch in all Lawson stores nationwide at once, on November 1, 1999. However, that September, the Jiji earthquake occurred in Taiwan, disrupting supply, ultimately delaying the launch.

Nintendo offered preorders at Lawson stores for a special release of Wario Land: Super Mario Land 3 pre-written onto a flash cartridge that could be picked up in October. However, after preorders began, Nintendo decided to delay the launch. This, alongside launching mail order rewriting, was announced to consumers in a letter enclosed with the pre-written cartridge.

Following that, Game Boy rewritable cartridge services launched at Lawson stores on March 1, 2000, and the pre-written cartridges of Wario Land: Super Mario Land 3 were made available in-store. Since these were offered both in celebration of the service launch, as well as an apology for the delay, they were distributed for a limited time for the same price as the normal release.

=== The End of the Lawson In-Store Service ===
As the months passed, fewer and fewer new games were offered. The final new Super Famicom game, Metal Slader Glory: Director's Cut, was released in December 2000. The final new Game Boy game, Loppi Puzzle Magazine: Hirameku Puzzle Dai-3-Gou (Loppiパズルマガジン ひらめくパズル第3号), was released in January 2002.

Nintendo announced the end of the Lawson in-store service on May 31, 2002. The announcement could be seen at the top of the Loppi kiosk screen at all times, in the kiosk catalog, and on Nintendo’s website. The service concluded on August 31, 2002.

The legal battle between used game retailers and major game publishers came to an end with the Supreme Court's ruling on April 25, 2002, which ruled the sale of used games legal. This outcome effectively curbed efforts to curtail the used game market. Ultimately by this point, the Super Famicom and Game Boy had long been superseded by not only the Nintendo 64, but also the GameCube and Game Boy Advance.

=== Direct Fulfillment and Shutdown ===
Directly following the Lawson in-store service termination, on September 1, 2002, Nintendo's Service Center began directly accepting cartridges in the mail to provide the service to existing consumers. There were two payment methods. For orders under ¥1000, the consumer could simply mail in the cartridge, the required payment, as well as either a stamp or postal order worth the same amount. For orders at or exceeding ¥1000, the money did not have to be mailed alongside the cartridge, but instead cash on delivery was used and the money was paid to the shipping company. However, eventually cash on delivery became the only payment method.

The service continued on for the next four years in this form. However, in early February 2007, the end of the service was announced to come on February 28, though in-progress orders would still be processed. Nintendo cited “changes in technology" (Note: 「電子機器環境の変遷によりサービスの維持継続が困難となった」 ("Changes in technology made it difficult to continue supporting the service.")) as to why the service ended.

== Lawson in-store service usage ==
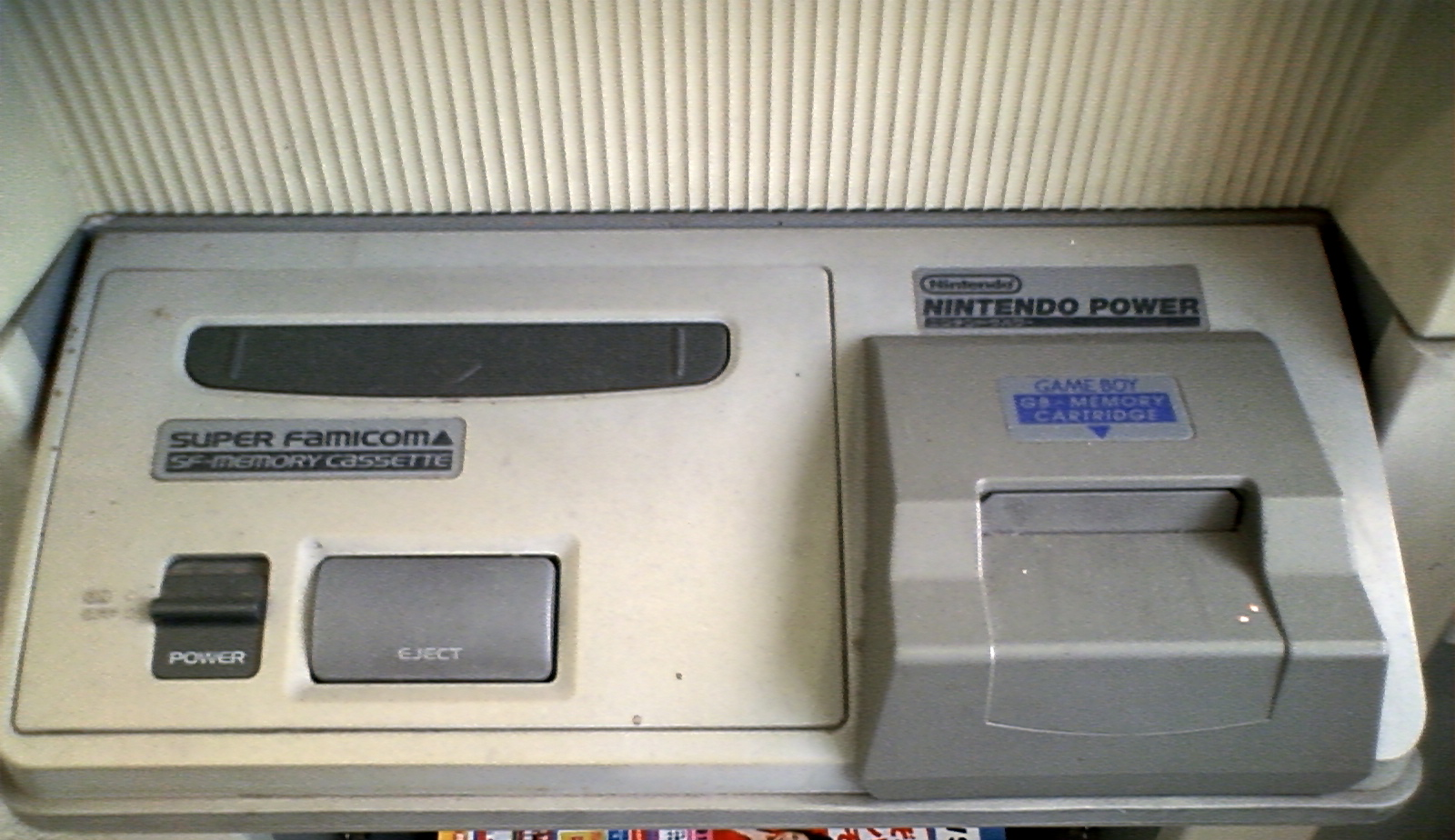
A Nintendo Power cartridge slot attached to a Loppi kiosk

The service operated through Lawson's multi-purpose Loppi kiosks, which were introduced alongside Nintendo's service. Rather than using dedicated hardware, Loppi kiosks simply had a cartridge slot.

Flash cartridges purchased either in-store or brought by the consumer were inserted into the cartridge slot in the store’s Loppi kiosk. The consumer would then select the game they wished to write to the cartridge on the screen. Should the cartridge not have enough space to write the selected game, it would prompt the consumer to select which game(s) they would like to erase. An instruction sheet could also be printed out starting in 1998. Once that was complete, the process was the same as any other Loppi purchase, except for cartridge writing. The kiosk would print out a ticket. The consumer would take the ticket to the register, pay, and then the clerk would use a cartridge writer behind the counter to erase and write to the cartridge. The consumer would receive both the flash cartridge and a ticket containing the details of all games erased and written to the cartridge. Game prices varied, with older games being relatively cheap, and newer games and Nintendo Power exclusives being more expensive.

== Print media distribution ==
=== Books ===
Nintendo Power Koushiki Asobikata BOOK
- Native name: NINTENDO POWER 公式遊び方BOOK
- Editor: Rekka-sha
- Categories: Catalog, video game magazine
- Frequency: Irregular
- Publisher: Nintendo; Media Factory
- First issue: 30 September 1997
- Final issue Number: 1 December 1997; 1
- Country: Japan
- Language: Japanese

Monthly Nintendo Power
- Native name: マンスリーNINTENDOパワー
- Editor: Rekka-sha
- Categories: Video game magazine
- Frequency: Monthly (planned)
- Publisher: Media Factory
- First issue: 1 January 1998
- Final issue: 1 January 1998
- Country: Japan
- Language: Japanese

Alongside the start of the service, Nintendo released a catalog introducing all the games offered called Nintendo Power Koushiki Asobikata BOOK (NINTENDO POWER 公式遊び方BOOK, Nintendo Power Official Guide Book). In this book, each rewritable game received 1-2 pages with various information. This included the number of blocks used, general instructions, and tips and tricks, known as "Play no Kimete" (プレイの決め手). A 3D model-based character called Mr. Memory (Mr.メモリ) would introduce the reception of the game and advice for beating it in a column called "Mr. Memory no Otanoshimi Guide" (Mr.メモリのお楽しみガイド) (each one would be called "Mr. Memory no (Game Title) Otanoshimi Guide", or roughly "Mr. Memory's Guide for Fun in (Game Title)"). The entire thing was set up like that of a video game magazine. The catalog also included quizzes where you could earn prizes, an explanation of how to use the service presented as a comic, and stickers to put on your rewritable cartridge telling you what games were present. At the launch of the service, those who purchased a rewritable cartridge received volume 0 of the catalog free of charge. With the expansion of titles on the service, Media Factory released volume 1 in December 1997 for a separate price of ¥380 before tax.

On January 1, 1998, a special volume 0 issue announcing serialization of a Nintendo news magazine, Monthly Nintendo Power (マンスリーNINTENDOパワー) (not to be confused with the American magazine), was released for ¥360 before tax. This magazine contained general information on new releases for Nintendo 64, 64DD, and Game Boy, special articles on Pokémon, but also information and instructions for the following new games sold via the Nintendo Power service:

- Heisei Shin Onigashima
  - A rerelease of the remake of the Famicom game, originally released for the Satellaview service
- Dōkyūsei 2
  - A new port of the NEC PC-98 game, following console ports to Sega Saturn and PlayStation
- Wrecking Crew '98
  - A new sequel to the original 1985 Famicom game

The magazine also included stickers for the flash cartridge, stickers for the Nintendo 64 controller, and Nintendo character stickers for yo-yos. A next issue was announced for late March at the end, but publication was cancelled with just this issue.

Both publications were edited by Rekka-sha, and designed by Banana Grove Studio. In both volume 1 of NINTENDO POWER Koushiki Asobikata BOOK and Monthly Nintendo Power, there was a section showcasing recommended games to download. These were introduced in the NINTENDO POWER Koushiki Asobikata BOOK by Hikari Ōta of the comedy duo, Bakushō Mondai, and athlete, Yukio Iketani. In Monthly Nintendo Power, these were introduced by the project supervisor of Momotarō Dentetsu, Akira Sakuma, and the designer of the logos for both Dragon Quest and Momotarō Dentetsu, Kazuo Enomoto. These are the games they recommended:

- Hikari Ōta: He spoke of his favorite kind of RPG being tactical RPGs, but also brought up scrolling shooter, Pop'n TwinBee, and The Game of Life style digital tabletop game, Daibakushō!! Jinsei Gekijō as recommendations in genres he did not really play.
- Yukio Iketani: He recommended Shin Megami Tensei and Gradius III since he was obsessed with them, and Pro Mahjong Kiwame III for practicing mahjong.
- Akira Sakuma: He recommended games he had a hand in developing, Shin Momotarō Densetsu and Super Momotarō Dentetsu II, and then suggested filling up the remaining space with Super Mario World.
- Kazuo Enomoto: He recommended Super Momotarō Dentetsu II as part of the theme of "Fun, Friendship, and Victory for All Pack" (Note: 「みんなで遊べて友情の勝利パック」), Metal Max 2 since a friend worked on it, and Torneko's Mystery Dungeon since being able to play it over and over again made it a good deal.

=== Instruction sheets ===
When the service launched, instructions were printed in the NINTENDO POWER Koushiki Asobikata Book and Monthly Nintendo Power. However, starting with the games released on the service during the first half of 1998, instruction sheets were distributed instead. One of these games, Wrecking Crew '98, had its instructions published early in the issue of Monthly Nintendo Power. During this first half year, consumers could print out the instruction sheets for free, and also received a "Mr. Memory no Otanoshimi Guide". Starting July 1998, the instruction sheets became an additional purchase for ¥30, and no further copies of the Nintendo Power Koushiki Asobikata Book issues were printed.

Super Famicom games each received a page-long instruction sheet. Game Boy games only received basic instructions, while all games in the Picross NP (ピクロスNP) and Loppi Puzzle Magazine (Loppiパズルマガジン) series received an instruction sheet each.

Following the move to mail-order, Nintendo released all the instruction sheets online as free to view, save, and print PDF files.

== Technical details ==
Each cartridge's flash memory is divided internally into eight blocks. Unless an 8-block game is loaded onto the cartridge, however, one block is reserved for the game selection menu, leaving only seven blocks for games. In addition, each cartridge has a small amount of SRAM for saved games, which is divided into sixteen blocks.

Games are rounded up in capacity; for example, a 10 megabit Super Famicom game needs three flash memory blocks totaling 12 megabits, and a Game Boy game that needs 100 kilobits of save space would need two SRAM blocks totaling 128 kilobits.

Nintendo Power has no Super Famicom enhancement chips such as the Super FX, so such games are incompatible.

=== Super Famicom ===
SF Memory Cassette (SFメモリカセット, SF Memori Kasetto)

- MSRP – ¥3,980
- Onboard flash memory (for game data) – 32 megabits total (4 megabits/block × 8 blocks)
- Onboard SRAM (for game saves) – 256 kilobits total (16 kilobits/block × 16 blocks)

=== Game Boy ===
GB Memory Cartridge (GBメモリカートリッジ, GB Memori Kātorijji)

- MSRP – ¥2,500
- Onboard flash memory for game data, 8 megabits (1 megabit/block × 8 blocks)
- Onboard SRAM for saved games, 1024 kilobits (64 kilobits/block × 16 blocks)

== Reception ==
When the Nintendo Power for Super Famicom launched, it was perceived by the press as being in part an effort to free up retailer shelf space for more Nintendo 64 products.

== List of games ==
=== Super Famicom games ===
==== First party games ====
Title	Release date	Developer(s)	Ref.
Title	JP	Developer(s)	Ref.
F-Zero	September 30, 1997	Nintendo EAD	
Fire Emblem: Monshō no Nazo	September 30, 1997	Intelligent Systems	
Fire Emblem: Seisen no Keifu	September 30, 1997	Intelligent Systems	
Kirby Bowl	September 30, 1997	HAL Laboratory, Nintendo EAD	
Mario's Super Picross	September 30, 1997	Jupiter, Ape	
Mother 2: Gīgu no Gyakushū	September 30, 1997	HAL Laboratory, Ape	
Panel de Pon	September 30, 1997	Intelligent Systems	
SimCity	September 30, 1997	Nintendo	
Super Donkey Kong	September 30, 1997	Rare	
Super Donkey Kong 2	September 30, 1997	Rare	
Super Donkey Kong 3	September 30, 1997	Rare	
Super Mario Collection	September 30, 1997	Nintendo EAD	
Super Mario World	September 30, 1997	Nintendo EAD	
Super Metroid	September 30, 1997	Nintendo R&D1, Intelligent Systems	
Heisei Shin Onigashima: Kōhen	December 1, 1997	Pax Softnica	
Heisei Shin Onigashima: Zenpen	December 1, 1997	Pax Softnica	
Wrecking Crew '98	January 1, 1998	Nintendo R&D1, Pax Softnica	
Kirby no Kirakira Kizzu	February 1, 1998	HAL Laboratory	
Super Punch-Out!!	March 1, 1998	Nintendo R&D3	
Famicom Tantei Club Part II: Ushiro ni Tatsu Shōjo	April 1, 1998	Nintendo R&D1	
Super Famicom Wars	May 1, 1998	Intelligent Systems	
Dr. Mario	June 1, 1998	Nintendo R&D1	
Zootto Mahjong!	July 1, 1998	Nintendo	
Sutte Hakkun	August 1, 1998	Nintendo R&D2, indieszero	
Derby Stallion '98	September 1, 1998	ParityBit	
Mini 4WD Let's & Go!! Power WGP2	October 1, 1998	Jupiter	
Power Lode Runner	January 1, 1999	T&E Soft	
Power Sokoban	January 1, 1999	Atelier Double	
Picross NP Vol. 1	April 1, 1999	Jupiter	
Picross NP Vol. 2	June 1, 1999	Jupiter	
Famicom Bunko: Hajimari no Mori	July 1, 1999	Nintendo R&D1, Pax Softnica	
Picross NP Vol. 3	August 1, 1999	Jupiter	
Fire Emblem: Thracia 776	September 1, 1999	Intelligent Systems	
Picross NP Vol. 4	October 1, 1999	Jupiter	
Picross NP Vol. 5	December 1, 1999	Jupiter	
Picross NP Vol. 6	February 1, 2000	Jupiter	
Picross NP Vol. 7	April 1, 2000	Jupiter	
Picross NP Vol. 8	June 1, 2000	Jupiter	
The Legend of Zelda: A Link to the Past	August 1, 2000	Nintendo EAD	
Metal Slader Glory: Director's Cut	December 1, 2000	HAL Laboratory	

==== Third party games ====
Title	Release date	Publisher	Released on cartridge	Ref.
Title	JP	Publisher	Released on cartridge	Ref.
Akagawa Jirou: Majotachi no Nemuri	December 1, 1997		Yes	
Akumajō Dracula XX	September 30, 1997		Yes	
Aretha the Super Famicom	August 1, 1998		Yes	
Aretha II: Ariel no Fushigi na Tabi	August 1, 1998		Yes	
The Atlas	December 1, 1997		Yes	
Axelay	December 1, 1997		Yes	
Breath of Fire II	September 30, 1997		Yes	
Cameltry	December 1, 1997		Yes	
Caravan Shooting Collection	December 1, 1997		Yes	
Clock Tower	September 30, 1997		Yes	
Columns	August 1, 1999		No	
Contra III: The Alien Wars	September 30, 1997		Yes	
Cosmo Gang the Puzzle	August 1, 1998		Yes	
Cosmo Gang the Video	August 1, 1998		Yes	
Cu-On-Pa	August 1, 1998		Yes	
Daikaijuu Monogatari	September 30, 1997		Yes	
Demon's Crest	December 1, 1997		Yes	
Der Langrisser	August 1, 1998		Yes	
Dōkyūsei 2	December 1, 1997		No	
Down the World: Mervil's Ambition	December 1, 1997		Yes	
Dragon Slayer: Eiyuu Densetsu	August 1, 1998		Yes	
Dragon Slayer: Eiyuu Densetsu II	August 1, 1998		Yes	
Feda: The Emblem of Justice	August 1, 1998		Yes	
Final Fight	December 1, 1997		Yes	
Final Fight 2	December 1, 1997		Yes	
The Firemen	December 1, 1997		Yes	
Fushigi no Dungeon 2: Furai no Shiren	August 1, 2000		Yes	
Gakkou de atta Kowai Hanashi	December 1, 1997		Yes	
Gokujo Parodius	September 30, 1997		Yes	
Gradius III	December 1, 1997		Yes	
Harvest Moon	August 1, 1998		Yes	
Heracles no Eikō III: Kamigami no Chinmoku	December 1, 1997		Yes	
Heracles no Eikō IV: Kamigami kara no Okurimono	December 1, 1997		Yes	
International Superstar Soccer Deluxe	August 1, 1998		Yes	
Kamaitachi no Yoru	September 30, 1997		Yes	
Kawa no Nushi Tsuri 2	December 1, 1997		Yes	
Kid Klown in Crazy Chase	August 1, 1998		Yes	
Koutetsu no Kishi	December 1, 1997		Yes	
Last Bible III	December 1, 1997		Yes	
Lennus II	December 1, 1997		Yes	
Libble Rabble	August 1, 1998		Yes	
Lord Monarch	August 1, 1998		Yes	
Lufia & the Fortress of Doom	December 1, 1997		Yes	
Magical Drop II	December 1, 1997		Yes	
Majin Tensei	December 1, 1997		Yes	
Majin Tensei II: Spiral Nemesis	December 1, 1997		Yes	
Mega Man 7	September 30, 1997		Yes	
Mega Man X	September 30, 1997		Yes	
Metal Marines	August 1, 1998		Yes	
Metal Max 2	December 1, 1997		Yes	
Otogirisō	September 30, 1997		Yes	
Ogre Battle: The March of the Black Queen	1998		Yes	
Pac-Man 2: The New Adventures	July 1, 1998		Yes	
Paladin's Quest	December 1, 1997		Yes	
Parodius: Non-Sense Fantasy	September 30, 1997		Yes	
Phalanx	August 1, 1998		Yes	
Pocky & Rocky	August 1, 1998		Yes	
Pop'n TwinBee	September 30, 1997		Yes	
Pop'n TwinBee: Rainbow Bell Adventures	September 30, 1997		Yes	
Puzzle Bobble	December 1, 1997		Yes	
Ring ni Kakero	June 1, 1998		No	
Shanghai III	August 1, 1998		Yes	
Shin Megami Tensei	December 1, 1997		Yes	
Shin Megami Tensei II	December 1, 1997		Yes	
Smash Tennis	July 1, 1998		Yes	
Space Invaders: The Original Game	December 1, 1997		Yes	
Street Fighter II Turbo: Hyper Fighting	September 30, 1997		Yes	
Super Black Bass 2	August 1, 1998		Yes	
Super Bomberman 3	September 30, 1997		Yes	
Super Family Gerende	February 1, 1998		No	
Super Fire Pro Wrestling X Premium	September 30, 1997		Yes	
Super Formation Soccer 96: World Club Edition	September 30, 1997		Yes	
Super Genjin 2	December 1, 1997		Yes	
Super Ghouls 'n Ghosts	September 30, 1997		Yes	
Super Jinsei Game 3	December 1, 1997		Yes	
Super Puyo Puyo	December 1, 1997		Yes	
Tactics Ogre	1998		Yes	
Tadaima Yuusha Boshuuchuu Okawari	December 1, 1997		Yes	
Tamagotchi Town	May 1, 1999		No	
Tokimeki Memorial: Densetsu no Ki no Shita de	September 30, 1997		Yes	
Torneko no Daibōken: Fushigi no Dungeon	September 30, 1997		Yes	
True Golf Classics: Waialae Country Club	December 1, 1997		Yes	
True Golf Classics: Wicked 18	1998		Yes	
Umi no Nushi Tsuri	December 1, 1997		Yes	
Uncharted Waters	August 1, 1998		Yes	
Wagyan Paradise	August 1, 1998		Yes	
Whirlo	August 1, 1998		Yes	
Winning Post 2: Program '96	August 1, 1998		Yes	
Wizardry I-II-III: Story of Llylgamyn	June 1, 1999		No	
Wizardry Gaiden IV	December 1, 1997		Yes	

=== Game Boy games ===
==== First party games ====
Title	Developer(s)	Release date	Ref.
Title	Developer(s)	JP	Ref.
Donkey Kong	Pax Softnica	March 1, 2000	
Super Donkey Kong GB	Rare	March 1, 2000	
Donkey Kong Land	Rare	March 1, 2000	
Dr. Mario	Nintendo R&D1	March 1, 2000	
F-1 Race	HAL Laboratory	March 1, 2000	
Game Boy Gallery	Nintendo R&D1, TOSE	March 1, 2000	
Game Boy Gallery 2	TOSE	March 1, 2000	
Game Boy Gallery 3	TOSE	March 1, 2000	
Game Boy Wars	Nintendo R&D1, Intelligent Systems	March 1, 2000	
Golf	Nintendo R&D2, HAL Laboratory	March 1, 2000	
Hoshi no Kirby	HAL Laboratory	March 1, 2000	
Hoshi no Kirby 2	HAL Laboratory	March 1, 2000	
Kaeru no Tame ni Kane wa Naru	Nintendo R&D1, Intelligent Systems	March 1, 2000	
Kirby no Block Ball	Nintendo R&D1, HAL Laboratory	March 1, 2000	
Kirby no Kirakira Kizzu	HAL Laboratory	March 1, 2000	
Kirby no Pinball	HAL Laboratory	March 1, 2000	
Mario no Picross	Jupiter, Ape	March 1, 2000	
Metroid II: Return of Samus	Nintendo R&D1	March 1, 2000	
Mogurānia	Pax Softnica	March 1, 2000	
Picross 2	Jupiter, Ape	March 1, 2000	
Solar Striker	Nintendo R&D1, Minakuchi Engineering	March 1, 2000	
Super Mario Bros. Deluxe	Nintendo R&D2	March 1, 2000	
Super Mario Land	Nintendo R&D1	March 1, 2000	
Super Mario Land 2: 6-Tsu no Kinkoka	Nintendo R&D1	March 1, 2000	
Super Mario Land 3: Wario Land	Nintendo R&D1	March 1, 2000	
Tennis	Nintendo EAD, Intelligent Systems	March 1, 2000	
Yakuman	Intelligent Systems	March 1, 2000	
Yoshi no Cookie	TOSE	March 1, 2000	
Yoshi no Panepon	Intelligent Systems	March 1, 2000	
Zelda no Densetsu: Yume o Miru Shima DX	Nintendo EAD	March 1, 2000	
Alleyway	Nintendo R&D1	August 1, 2000	
Balloon Fight GB	Nintendo R&D1, Pax Softnica	August 1, 2000	
Radar Mission	Pax Softnica	August 1, 2000	
Tetris	Nintendo R&D1	September 1, 2000	
Tetris DX	Nintendo R&D1	September 1, 2000	

==== Third party games ====
Third party games
Title	Release date	Publisher	Price
Genuine Hanafuda GB	December 1, 2000	Artron	1,050 yen
Match Up Shogi	July 1, 2000	Athena	1,050 yen
Trick Border Grand Prix	December 1, 2000	Athena	1,050 yen
Professional Mahjong Goku GB	March 1, 2000	Athena	1,050 yen
Professional Mahjong Goku GB2	June 1, 2001	Athena	1,050 yen
Purikura Pocket	March 1, 2000	Atlus	1,050 yen
Purikura Pocket2	March 1, 2000	Atlus	1,050 yen
Purikura Pocket3	March 1, 2000	Atlus	1,050 yen
Hamster Paradise	June 1, 2001	Atlus	1,050 yen
Megami Tensei Gaiden: Last Bible	March 1, 2000	Atlus	1,050 yen
Megami Tensei Gaiden: Last Bible II	March 1, 2000	Atlus	1,050 yen
Guru Guru Characters	March 1, 2000	Atlus	1,050 yen
Super Genie Heroes Wataru; Mazekko Monster 2	August 1, 2000	Banpresto	1,050 yen
Kakutou Ryouri Densetsu Bistro Recipe: Wonder Battle	October 1, 2000	Banpresto	1,050 yen
Kakutou Ryouri Densetsu Bistro Recipe - Gekitou Foodon Battle Hen	December 1, 2000	Banpresto	1,050 yen
Bionic Commando	March 1, 2000	Capcom	1,050 yen
Gargoyle's Quest 2	March 1, 2000	Capcom	1,050 yen
Gargoyle's Quest	March 1, 2000	Capcom	1,050 yen
Street Fighter II	March 1, 2000	Capcom	1,050 yen
Rockman World	March 1, 2001	Capcom	1,050 yen
Rockman World 2	March 1, 2001	Capcom	1,050 yen
Rockman World 3	March 1, 2001	Capcom	1,050 yen
Rockman World 5	April 1, 2001	Capcom	1,050 yen
Rockman World 4	April 1, 2001	Capcom	1,050 yen
Sword GB	May 1, 2001	Kemco	1,050 yen
Batman Beyond	May 1, 2001	Kemco	1,050 yen
Spy vs. Spy	May 1, 2001	Kemco	1,050 yen
Authentic 4-person Mahjong Mahjong King	April 1, 2000	Child	1,050 yen
Shiren the Wanderer GB: Monster of Moonlight Village	March 1, 2000	Chunsoft	1,050 yen
Doraemon no Game Boy de Asobuoyo: Deluxe 10	August 1, 2000	Epoch Co.	1,050 yen
Doraemon Kart	August 1, 2000	Epoch Co.	1,050 yen
Dragon Slayer Gaiden; The Crown of Sleep	March 1, 2000	Epoch Co.	1,050 yen
Dragon Slayer	July 1, 2000	Epoch Co.	1,050 yen
Bomberman GB 3	March 1, 2000	Hudson Soft	1,050 yen
Momotaro Dengeki 2	March 1, 2000	Hudson Soft	1,050 yen
GB Genjin 2	March 1, 2000	Hudson Soft	1,050 yen
Adventure Island 3	June 1, 2000	Hudson Soft	1,050 yen
Game Boy Wars Turbo	March 1, 2000	Hudson Soft	1,050 yen
Super Momotaro Electric Railway 2	March 1, 2000	Hudson Soft	1,050 yen
Momotaro Electric Railway jr-Rolls around Ramen in Japan	December 1, 2000	Hudson Soft	1,050 yen
Same Game	March 1, 2000	Hudson Soft	1,050 yen
Bomberman Quest	August 1, 2000	Hudson Soft	1,050 yen
Fairy Kitty Good Luck Dictionary -Fortune-telling of Fairy Land-	March 1, 2000	Imagineer	1,050 yen
Medabot Kabuto Version	March 1, 2000	Imagineer	1,050 yen
Medabot Kuwagata Version	March 1, 2000	Imagineer	1,050 yen
Sanrio Timenet: Future	May 1, 2000	Imagineer	1,050 yen
Sanrio Timenet: Past	May 1, 2000	Imagineer	1,050 yen
Medarot Parts Collection	December 1, 2000	Imagineer	1,050 yen
Ultimate Surfing	July 1, 2001	Natsume	1,050 yen
Kid Dracula	March 1, 2000	Konami	1,050 yen
Ganbare Goemon: Hoshizorashi Dynamites Arawaru!!	July 1, 2001	Konami	1,050 yen
Yu-Gi-Oh! Monster Capsule GB	February 1, 2001	Konami	1,050 yen
Survival Kids	Feb 1 2001	Konami	1,050 yen
Nemesis II	March 1, 2000	Konami	1,050 yen
It's a World Rally	August 1, 2000	Konami	1,050 yen
Yu-Gi-Oh! Duel Monsters	March 1, 2000	Konami	1,050 yen
Konami GB Collection Vol.1	March 1, 2000	Konami	1,050 yen
Konami GB Collection Vol.2	March 1, 2000	Konami	1,050 yen
Konami GB Collection Vol.4	March 1, 2000	Konami	1,050 yen
BeatmaniaGB	May 1, 2000	Konami	1,050 yen
Hanasaka Tenshi Tenten-kun's; Beat Breaker	April 1, 2001	Konami	1,050 yen
Bakuchou Retrieve Master	March 1, 2000	Konami	1,050 yen
God Medicine : Birth of a Fantasy World	March 1, 2000	Konami	1,050 yen
Ganbare Goemon: Tengu-tō no Gyakushū!	May 1, 2000	Konami	1,050 yen
Azure Dreams	August 1, 2000	Konami	1,050 yen
Pac-Man	March 1, 2000	Namco	1,050 yen
Namco Gallery VOL. 1	March 1, 2000	Namco	1,050 yen
Namco Gallery VOL. 3	March 1, 2000	Namco	1,050 yen
Mr. Driller	June 1, 2001	Namco	1,050 yen
Great Greed	March 1, 2000	Namco	1,050 yen
The Shutoko Racing	April 1, 2000	Pony Canyon	1,050 yen
Shogi 2	April 1, 2000	Pony Canyon	1,050 yen
Karamuchou Ha Oosawagi!	August 1, 2001	Starfish	1,575 yen
Super Black Bass Pocket 3	March 1, 2000	Starfish	1,050 yen
Kuzume Monster Parfait	June 1, 2001	Starfish	1,050 yen
Pachi Pachi Pachisuro New Pulsar	June 1, 2001	Starfish	1,050 yen
Karamuchou Ha Oosawagi!	March 1, 2000	Starfish	1,050 yen
Fossil Genesis Reborn II	March 1, 2000	Starfish	1,050 yen
Kogururu Guruguru; ~Gurugururu Nakayoshi~	July 1, 2001	Sting	1,050 yen
Loppi Puzzle Magazine first issue of puzzle	August 1, 2001	Success	630 yen
Loppi Puzzle Magazine; Inspirational puzzle first issue	September 1, 2001	Success	630 yen
Loppi Puzzle Magazine; Thinking puzzle No. 2	October 1, 2001	Success	630 yen
Loppi Puzzle Magazine; Inspirational Puzzle No. 2	November 1, 2001	Success	630 yen
Loppi Puzzle Magazine- thinking puzzle No. 3	December 1, 2001	Success	630 yen
Petit Carat	July 1, 2000	Taito	1,050 yen
Bubble Bobble	July 1, 2000	Taito	1,050 yen
Space Invaders	March 1, 2000	Taito	1,050 yen
Sagaia	July 1, 2000	Taito	1,050 yen
Puzzle Bobble GB	March 1, 2000	Taito	1,050 yen
Quick's adventure	September 1, 2000	Taito	1,050 yen
Nettou Toshinden	March 1, 2000	Takara	1,050 yen
Chibi Maruko-chan 4 This is Japan! Prince	November 1, 2000	Takara	1,050 yen
Chibi Maruko-chan; Maruko Deluxe Theater	November 1, 2000	Takara	1,050 yen
Life Game	March 1, 2000	Takara	1,050 yen
Othello World	May 1, 2000	Tsukuda original	1,050 yen
Dogtato	December 1, 2000	Victor Interactive Software	1,050 yen
Harvest Moon GB	August 1, 2000	Victor Interactive Software	1,050 yen
Legend of the River King 2	March 1, 2000	Victor Interactive Software	1,050 yen
Legend of the River King 3	March 1, 2000	Victor Interactive Software	1,050 yen
Aretha	March 1, 2000	Yanoman	1,050 yen
Aretha II	March 1, 2000	Yanoman	1,050 yen
Aretha III	March 1, 2000	Yanoman	1,050 yen
