= Picross 3D: Round 2 =

2015 video game

- Developer: HAL Laboratory
- Publisher: Nintendo
- Director: Nobuyuki Okada
- Producers: Satoshi Mitsuhara; Keisuke Terasaki
- Programmers: Yoichi Makiuchi; Kensuke Morita; Ryo Matsuzaki; Takahiro Yamada
- Composers: Megumi Ohara; Hirokazu Ando; Shogo Sakai
- Series: Picross 3D
- Platform: Nintendo 3DS
- Release: JP: October 1, 2015; NA: September 1, 2016; EU: December 2, 2016; AU: December 3, 2016
- Genre: Puzzle
- Mode: Single-player

Picross 3D: Round 2 is a puzzle video game developed by HAL Laboratory and published by Nintendo for the Nintendo 3DS. It is the sequel to the 2009 Nintendo DS game, Picross 3D. The game was released in Japan on October 1, 2015, in North America on September 1, 2016, in Europe on December 2, 2016, and in Australia on December 3, 2016. In North America, it was only released as a digital-only download on the Nintendo eShop.

== Gameplay ==
The puzzle-solving process in the game with the addition of orange blocks

Picross 3D: Round 2 features gameplay similar to that of its predecessor, Picross 3D, in which the rules of nonograms are applied to three-dimensional puzzles. Three difficulty levels can be chosen for each puzzle, which are easy, medium, and hard. In each puzzle, players must analyze the numbers featured on rows and columns and either paint or break away specific blocks to reveal a 3D model of an object or character. This time around, each puzzle possesses two kinds of colored blocks that must be painted accordingly; blue blocks, which represent straight square blocks, and orange blocks, which transform into curved or cut-out blocks when filled in. This introduces dual numbers, indicating rows or columns containing both blue and orange blocks. Players are penalized for destroying blocks incorrectly or painting a block the wrong color. Players can use flags to highlight potential blocks in certain colors if they are unsure, and can use bombs to quickly clear rows and columns containing no blocks. Players can also unlock up to nine additional Nintendo-themed puzzles by scanning in compatible amiibo figures.

Besides an addition of over 370 puzzles, it also features color variations for the remaining of the blocks.

== Reception ==
Reception

Aggregate score
Aggregator	Score
Metacritic	86/100

Review scores
Publication	Score
Destructoid	8.5/10
Game Informer	8.75/10
Nintendo Life	9/10
Nintendo World Report	9.5/10
Shacknews	9/10

Picross 3D: Round 2 received "generally favorable reviews" according to the review aggregator Metacritic. Nintendo Life gave the game 9 stars out of 10 and called it a "gem". Multiple authors of GamesRadar+ consider the game one of the best Nintendo 3DS games, as well as one of the best puzzle games ever made. Other critics have claimed as a hidden gem, and one of the best games released in 2016.

== See also ==
- Picross, the puzzle series that Picross 3D: Round 2 is a part of.
