= Lennus II =

1996 video game

Lennus II: Fūin no Shito
- Developer: Copya System
- Publisher: Asmik Corporation
- Director: Hidenori Shibao
- Composer: Kōhei Tanaka
- Platform: Super Famicom
- Release: JP: July 26, 1996; JP: December 1, 1997 (Nintendo Power)
- Genre: Role-playing
- Mode: Single-player

Lennus II: Fūin no Shito (レナスII 封印の使徒; "Lennus II: The Apostles of the Seals") is a 1996 role-playing video game for the Super Famicom. It was developed by Copya System, and published by Asmik Corporation.

== Story ==
The game takes place on the moon named "Eltz" that orbits the planet "Raiga". The first game took place on Lennus, another moon of Raiga. The plot centers around a hero, Falus.

== Gameplay ==
Gameplay is fairly similar to the original Lennus / Paladin's Quest:

- The player can swap out mercenary equipment.
- There have been some revisions to the magic system.
  - There are eight spirits: Fire, Light, Wind, Gold, Earth, Sky, Water and Void, with one spell for each spirit and each pair of spirits, for 36 spells.
  - Falus starts the game with three of the eight spirits, and can gain the powers of the other five through sidequests. He can only cast spells from the spirits he currently has equipped, and only has a limited number of slots (starting with only a single slot, with three more slots unlockable through sidequests for a maximum of four, allowing up to 10 of the 36 spells to be available at a time), and can only swap spirits outside of combat.
  - Much like in Paladin's Quest, each mercenary has a fixed repertoire of spirits, which are automatically equipped and cannot be swapped out.
  - Instead of building up spirit skill ratings by repeatedly casting associated spells, in Lennus II, spirits are powered up by defeating monsters, who yield a sort of spirit-specific experience points in addition to regular experience points.

== Development ==
The game was developed by Copya system, and published by Asmik Corporation. It is a sequel to Lennus: Memory of the Ancient Machine. Enix brought the original Lennus to North America as Paladin's Quest.

The game was directed and written by Hidenori Shibao, who also directed the original. The music for the game was made by Kohei Tanaka. Shibao was writing strategy guides and making 20 million yen per year, but working on Lennus II he was only making 2 million yen a year. The game took four years to finish, instead of the planned two years. Shibao said: "It was like the entire project was cursed!"

Developer Copya System changed its name to "Shangri-La" in 1996.

== Release ==
Lennus II was released on July 28, 1996 for the Super Famicom. A Nintendo Power version was released on December 1, 1997. According to Shibao the game didn't sell well and he described it as "a huge bomb". For that reasons, plans for Lennus III were shelved, and the game was never made. The plot for the third game would have focused on the planet Raiga itself, and the construction of the two moons.

Enix had closed its American headquarters by this time, and focus shifted to the Nintendo 64. The game has never been released outside of Japan, but a fan translation of the game into English was created for it in 2008.

Two tracks from the game were recorded by the Tokyo Philharmonic Orchestra for release on the Orchestral Game Concert compilations.

== Reception ==
Reception

Review score
Publication	Score
Famitsu	7/10, 5/10, 6/10, 5/10

In Famicom Tsūshin commented on the game in terms of graphics and gameplay. Hamamura Tsūshin found the game's graphics were unique and the in-game world was well established as if it were a series that had already spanned generations. Two other found the graphics to be low quality, with one saying that it gave the impression of an RPG from a bygone era. One reviewer found the battles in the game monotonous while another said that raising spirits in the game was fun but battles were tedious.
