= Downloadable content =

Additional content for a video game

Downloadable content (DLC) (Note: The initialism DLC may be treated as a mass noun ("three DLC") or a count noun ("three DLCs"), depending on the writer. Downloadable content (like content in this sense) is generally treated as a mass noun.) is additional content created for an already released video game, distributed through the Internet by the game's publisher. It can be added for no extra cost or as a form of video game monetization, enabling the publisher to gain additional revenue from a title after it has been purchased, often using a microtransaction system.

DLC can range from cosmetic content, such as skins, to new in-game content, like characters, levels, modes, and larger expansions that may contain a mix of such content as a continuation of the base game. In some games, multiple DLCs (including future DLC not yet released) may be bundled as part of a "season pass"—typically at a discount rather than purchasing each DLC individually.

While the Dreamcast was the first home console to support DLC (albeit in a limited form due to hardware and internet connection limitations), Microsoft's Xbox helped popularize the concept. Since the seventh generation of video game consoles, DLC has been a prevalent feature of major video game platforms with internet connectivity.

== Etymology ==
Since the popularization of microtransactions in online distribution platforms such as Steam, the term DLC has become a synonymous for any form of paid content in video games, regardless of whether they constitute the download of new content. Furthermore, this led to the creation of the oxymoronic term "on-disc DLC" for content included on the game's original files but locked behind a paywall.

== History ==
=== Precursors to DLC ===
The earliest form of downloadable content were offerings of full games, such as on the Atari 2600's GameLine service, which allowed users to download games using a telephone line. A similar service, Sega Channel, allowed for the downloading of games to the Sega Genesis over a cable line. While the GameLine and Sega Channel services allowed for the distribution of entire titles, they did not provide downloadable content for existing titles.

Expansion packs were sold at retail for some PC games, which featured content such as additional levels, characters, or maps for a base game. They often required an installation of the original game in order to function, but some games (such as Half-Life) had "standalone" expansions, which were essentially spin-off games that reused engine code and assets from the original game.

=== On consoles ===
The Dreamcast was the first console to feature online support as a standard; DLC was available, though limited in size due to the narrowband connection and the 200 block limit of the Visual Memory Unit memory card. These online features were still considered a breakthrough in video games.

With the release of the Xbox, Microsoft was the second company to implement downloadable content. Many Xbox titles, including Splinter Cell, Halo 2, and Ninja Gaiden, offered varying amounts of extra content, available for download through the Xbox Live service. Most of this content was available free.

With the advent of the GameCube, Nintendo was the third company to implement downloadable content. Many GameCube titles offered varying amounts of extra content from Game Boy Advance titles with the GameCube – Game Boy Advance link cable. All of this content was available free.

The Xbox 360 (2005) included more robust support for digital distribution, including DLC downloads and purchases, via its Xbox Live Marketplace service. Microsoft believed that publishers would benefit by offering small pieces of content at a small cost ($1 to $5), rather than full expansion packs (~$20), as this would allow players to pick and chose what content they desired, providing revenue to the publishers. Microsoft also utilized a digital currency known as "Microsoft Points" for transactions, which could also be purchased through physical gift cards to avoid the banking fees associated with the small price points.

The PlayStation 3 (2006) adopted the same approach with their downloadable hub, the PlayStation Store. Sony planned on having the bulk of its content be purchased separately via many separate online microtransactions for PlayStation Network titles, including Gran Turismo HD Concept and Gran Turismo 5 Prologue.

The Wii (2006) featured a sparser amount of downloadable content on their Wii Shop Channel, the bulk of which is accounted for by digital distribution of emulated Nintendo titles from previous generations.

Music video games, such as titles from the Guitar Hero and Rock Band franchises, took significant advantage of downloadable content as a means of offering new songs to be played in-game. Harmonix claimed that Guitar Hero II would feature "more online content than anyone has ever seen in a game to this date." Rock Band features the largest number of downloadable items of any console video game, with a steady number of new songs that were added weekly between 2007 and 2013. Acquiring all the downloadable content for Rock Band would, as of July 12, 2012, cost $5,880.10.

=== On personal computers ===
As the popularity and speed of internet connections rose, so did the popularity of using the internet for digital distribution of media. User-created game mods and maps were distributed exclusively online, as they were mainly created by people without the infrastructure capable of distributing the content through physical media.

In 1997, Cavedog offered a new unit every month as free downloadable content for their real-time strategy computer game Total Annihilation.

Later PC digital distribution platforms, such as Games for Windows Marketplace and Steam, would add support for DLC in a similar manner to consoles.

=== On handhelds ===
Nokia phones of the late 1990s and early 2000s shipped with side-scrolling shooter Space Impact, available on various models. With the introduction of WAP in 2000, additional downloadable content for the game, with extra levels, became available.

The Nintendo Wi-Fi Connection service on the Nintendo DS could be used to obtain a form of DLC for certain games, such as Picross DS—where players could download puzzle "packs" of classic puzzles from previous Picross series games (such as Mario's Picross). as well as downloadable user generated content. Due to the Nintendo DS's use of cartridges and lack of dedicated storage, most "DLC" for DS games was limited in scope, or in some cases (such as Professor Layton and the Curious Village and Moero! Nekketsu Rhythm Damashii Osu! Tatakae! Ouendan 2), was already part of the game's data on the cartridge, and merely unlocked. Its successor, the Nintendo 3DS, natively supported the purchase of DLC for supported titles via Nintendo eShop.

Starting with iPhone OS 3, downloadable content became available for the platform via applications bought from the App Store. While this ability was initially only available to developers for paid applications, Apple eventually allowed for developers to offer this in free applications as well in October 2009.

== On-disc DLC ==
In some cases, a purchased DLC may not actually download new content to the device, but merely consists of data used to enable associated content that is already present within the game's data. DLC of this nature revealed via data mining is typically referred to as "on-disc DLC" or PULC (premium unlockable content).

This practice has sometimes been considered controversial, with publishers being accused of using what is effectively a microtransaction to lock access to content that was already contained within the game as sold at retail.

Data relating to future DLC may be included on-disc or downloaded during updates for technical reasons as well, either to ensure online multiplayer compatibility for existing content between players who have not yet purchased the new DLC, or as dormant support code for planned content that is still in development at the time of the release.

== Monetization ==
Downloadable content is often offered for a price. Since Facebook games popularized the business model of microtransactions, some have criticized downloadable content as being overpriced and an incentive for developers to leave items out of the initial release, with The Elder Scrolls IV: Oblivion's horse armor DLC having faced a mixed reception upon its release for that reason. However, by 2009, the Horse Armor DLC was one of the top ten content packs that Bethesda had sold, which justified the DLC model for future games. Where a normal software disc may allow its license sold or traded, DLC is generally locked to a specific user's account and does not come with the ability to transfer that license to another user.

In addition to individual content downloads, video game publishers sometimes offer a "season pass", which allows users to pre-order a selection of upcoming content over a specific time period, and ensuring the customer's ability to immediately obtain the content upon release. As users do not have the ability to fully preview the content before their purchase, there is a chance that the content of a season pass may not be of a sufficient quality to justify the purchase. In multiplayer games, season passes may also segregate the player base if it is the primary means of receiving gameplay content such as maps.

Microsoft has been known to require developers to charge for their content, when the developers would rather release their content for free. Some content has even been withheld from release because the developer refused to charge the amount Microsoft required. Epic Games, known for continual support of their older titles with downloadable updates, believed that releasing downloadable content over the course of a game's lifetime helped increase sales throughout, and had succeeded well with that business-model in the past, but was required to implement fees for downloads when releasing content for their Microsoft-published game, Gears of War.

As of 2010 the sale of DLC makes up around 20% of video games sales, a substantial portion of a developer's profit margin. Developers are beginning to use the sale of DLC for an already successful game series to fund the development of new IPs or sequels to existing games.

== Availability ==
DLC is usually distributed through a console platform's online storefront, such as Microsoft Store, Nintendo eShop, PlayStation Store, or similar storefronts for PC games such as Steam. Platform exclusivity can also apply to DLC; in 2010, Activision reached an exclusivity deal with Microsoft making all DLC for Call of Duty games time-limited exclusives to Xbox consoles. After this contract expired, Activision signed a similar exclusivity agreement with Sony and PlayStation in 2015.

Some time after a game's original release, a publisher may issue a new retail SKU of the game with all of its existing DLC included at no additional charge and, in some cases, exclusive content which may be released as DLC for existing owners in the future. The resulting product is often branded with a subtitle to distinguish it from the original release, such as "Game of the Year Edition", "Definitive Edition" or "Complete Edition". Destiny was reissued twice to coincide with its "Year 2" and "Year 3" milestones and associated DLC expansions; a compilation of the game's existing DLC and newly released The Taken King expansion was released in 2015 under the title Destiny: The Taken King — Legendary Edition, while the game was re-issued again in 2016 as Destiny: The Collection to add Rise of Iron.

There have also been cases where DLCs were intended to be part of the main game, but they were later stripped out of it in order to be sold as a separate feature. Tomb Raider: Underworld has been criticized for providing two DLCs, exclusive to the Xbox 360, that were supposedly removed from the original game. The Sims 4: My First Pet was likewise criticised for containing items that had seemingly been removed from the Cats & Dogs expansion, with the DLC requiring the downloadable expansion pack in order to work. PCGamesN described it as "a stuff pack for an expansion pack."

== In other media ==
While video games are the origins of downloadable content, with movies, books and music also becoming more popular in the digital sphere, experimental DLC has also been attempted. Amazon's Kindle service for example allows updating ebooks, which allows authors to not only update and correct work, but also add content.
