= My Nintendo Picross: The Legend of Zelda: Twilight Princess =

2016 video game

- Developer: Jupiter Corporation
- Publisher: Nintendo
- Series: The Legend of Zelda
- Platform: Nintendo 3DS
- Release: March 31, 2016
- Genre: Puzzle
- Mode: Single-player

My Nintendo Picross: The Legend of Zelda: Twilight Princess is a 2016 puzzle video game and part of the Picross series. The title is a spin-off of the Picross e series, and features puzzles based on characters and settings from the 2006 title The Legend of Zelda: Twilight Princess, an entry in The Legend of Zelda series of action-adventure games. The game was developed by Jupiter Corporation and published by Nintendo for the 3DS handheld system, and was released to promote the HD remaster of Twilight Princess on Wii U.

The game was originally leaked on March 7, 2016, as a full-game reward for the My Nintendo rewards program, which was set to release in the same month. On March 17, the game was announced as an exclusive reward for the service, and was released on March 31, 2016. Critics rated My Nintendo Picross positively for its value and presentation, but called some aspects of the game limited. After the closure of the 3DS eShop in March 2023, the game was delisted from the My Nintendo service and is no longer redeemable.

== Gameplay ==
In My Nintendo Picross, the player solves puzzles to create images inspired by The Legend of Zelda: Twilight Princess.

My Nintendo Picross: The Legend of Zelda: Twilight Princess is a nonogram video game with pictures based on The Legend of Zelda: Twilight Princess. The game is controlled between button and stylus options for filling in squares, and includes a hint system; compared to previous Jupiter Picross titles, the stylus controls act as a toggle switch. The puzzle in progress is located on the bottom screen while the resulting picture (above a visual backdrop from Twilight Princess) is located on the top screen. The overall objective is to clear the puzzle within 60 minutes while avoiding time penalties for incorrect entries in order to unlock the color image.

When first starting the game, the player is walked through a tutorial by the character Midna, who also serves as the game's hostess. The game offers 45 puzzles across several modes accessible from the main screen; regular Picross, Mega Picross, and Micross. The Mega Picross mode makes the same images as the regular Picross mode, but contains number clues incorporating two rows or columns. Micross contains one large panel that is assembled by completing 57 smaller puzzles. The game also had support for Miiverse, as any completed puzzle could be used as stamps for handwritten posts.

== Release ==
My Nintendo Picross: The Legend of Zelda: Twilight Princess was originally released on March 31, 2016, as an exclusive, full game reward for the My Nintendo digital rewards service; the release coincided with the service's worldwide launch. The game was originally leaked on March 7 after a tweet was posted featuring the game's title screen, simultaneously revealing that Jupiter Corporation would be heading the title and a tentative release date of March 31. The leak happened similarly to that of the Twilight Princess HD remaster, which itself released that month on March 4. My Nintendo Picross was later announced as a reward for the platform on March 17, and could be redeemed in exchange for 1000 Platinum Points.

My Nintendo Picross was initially planned to be a limited-time offer, and would have been removed from My Nintendo on October 1, 2016. However, Nintendo eliminated the expiration date in all regions soon before the game was due to expire, and allowed it to be redeemed indefinitely. Although redeemable discounts for 3DS and Wii U eShop games were removed in 2021, My Nintendo Picross remained on the My Nintendo service. The game was eventually permanently removed from the service on March 25, 2023, coinciding with the worldwide closure of the Nintendo eShop for 3DS that same month. Neal Ronaghan of Nintendo World Report wrote that the game was "potentially lost to time" after the closure of the 3DS eShop.

== Reception ==
Reception

Review scores
Publication	Score
Nintendo Life	8/10
Nintendo World Report	7/10

The game's reviewers were small in quantity but generally decent. Neal Ronaghan of Nintendo World Report recommended it to Zelda fans, opining its theme alone was "a hell of an enticement", but not to general picross fans. Thomas Whitehead of Nintendo Life was amazed by the perceived high amount of effort into making a "quality" audio-visual experience, particularly in its "surprising amount of content". Ronaghan noted the amount of polish into the controls and options, comparing them to a full Picross e game.

Pros included its helpful tutorial, Midna's presence, and its sound design, which Jenni Lada of Siliconera claimed "make the game". Criticisms included the lack of a zoom option, a monotononous selection of images, and its panel-marking system deviating from most Picross games, hurting the experienced player's muscle memory.

== Legacy ==
While Pokémon Picross and My Nintendo Picross, both Nintendo collaborations, released in quick succession, the games never received a Nintendo-based follow-up, with Jupiter Corporation left to release non-themed Picross games or collaborate with other publishers. In 2023, Norichika Meguro, managing director of Jupiter, stated that while the company wanted to collaborate with Nintendo, it was more difficult than before due to how protective they are of their intellectual property.
