= Disney Sports Motocross =

2003 video game

- Developer: Jupiter Corporation
- Publisher: Konami
- Platform: Game Boy Advance
- Release: 29 March 2003
- Genre: Racing
- Modes: Single-player, Multiplayer

Disney Sports Motocross is a 2003 motocross racing video game for the Game Boy Advance developed by Jupiter Corporation and published by Konami. The game is the final of a series of Disney-licensed sports titles under the Disney Sports brand. The game is a motocross game in which players can race as Disney licensed characters, including Mickey Mouse, across seven stages. Upon release, Disney Sports Motocross received a mixed reception, with reviewers praising the game's graphics, and critiquing the game's lack of variety in courses, confusing controls and visual design, and difficulty.

== Gameplay ==
A screenshot of Disney Sports Motocross.

Single player modes include a tournament mode named the Championship Cup, in which players complete six courses with different laps and heats, as well as Time Attack, Score Attack, Exhibition, minigames and tutorials. The game also supports local multiplayer for up to four players using the Game Link Cable. Races take place across seven courses, and players can select one of six Disney characters (Mickey, Minnie, Donald, Daisy, Goofy, and Pete) to race, each with different attributes. Players control their racer with the D-Pad and the buttons to accelerate and use a limited turbo boost. Players improve their performance in the race by collecting gems and performing tricks of increasing difficulty levels once enough gems are collected. Successfully performing tricks will fill a meter that boosts the player's speed, and high-level tricks can slow down other racers. Performing well in races grants item that enhances attributes to improve performance in later races. Minigames include "Tire Panic", a steering challenge avoiding incoming tires, "Rock Crush", requiring the player to bounce off boulders, and "Brake or Splash!", making the player stop as close as possible to the end of a pier.

== Reception ==
Reception

Aggregate score
Aggregator	Score
Metacritic	56%

Review scores
Publication	Score
GameSpy	48%
GameZone	6.9/10
IGN	5/10
Nintendo Power	2.8/5
Nintendo World Report	7.0/10
MAN!AC	59%

Disney Sports Motocross received "mixed to average" reviews, according to review aggregator Metacritic. Several critics noted the game's similarities to Excitebike, a Nintendo motocross racing game. Ben Kosmina of Planet GameCube assessed the game to be "decent", praising its visuals as "well-animated" and "colorful and clear", but found the game's difficulty to vary between modes from "mind-numbingly simple" to "insanely difficult". Anise Hollingshead of GameZone praised the game's user friendliness, but found it to lack depth, stating "the gameplay soon becomes blasé, due to the sameness every time with only six tracks". Steve Steinberg of 'GameSpy considered the game to be one of the weakest Disney titles for its "lack of any real Disney-ness" with "no sense of the characters' personalities, voices of quirks" and one of the weakest motocross titles due to its "dreadful camera", "frustrating" gameplay and "weak" minigames. Craig Harris of IGN dismissed the game as an "extremely disappointing" interpretation of Excitebike, stating its elements "just don't work" due to tracks being "extremely hard to follow" due to the visuals and controls, having few tracks for a racing game, and remarking that the minigames were "extremely basic" with "no challenge at all".
