= Loppi (kiosk) =

Japanese convenience store multimedia kiosk

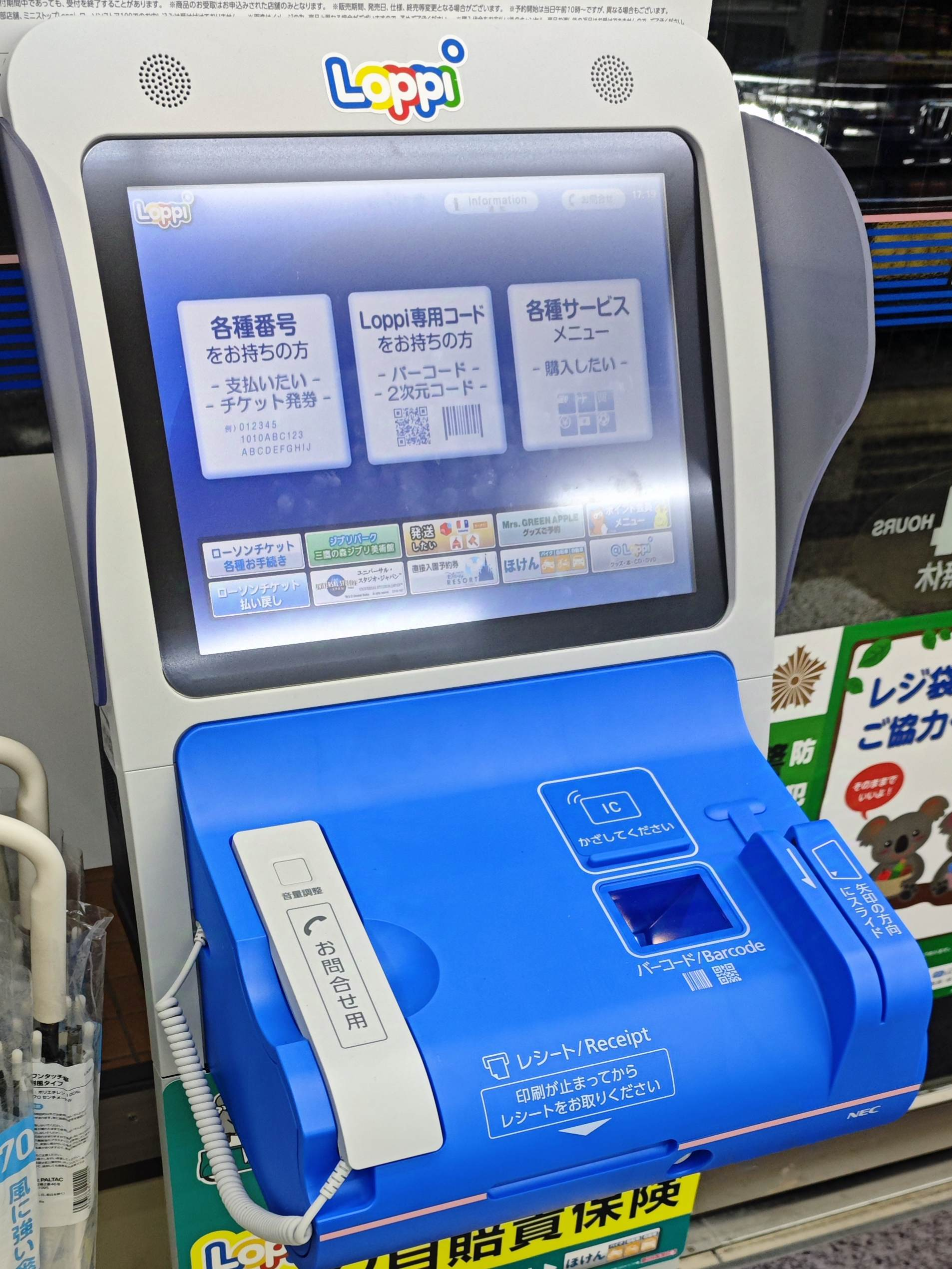
A Loppi kiosk

Loppi (ロッピー, Roppī) is a Japanese self-service multimedia kiosk found primarily in the Lawson chain of convenience stores in Japan. The kiosks were introduced starting on September 30, 1997 with stores in the Tokyo metropolitan area, and then expanding to all Lawson stores nationwide in February 1998. The goal was to provide items that were difficult to obtain and limited edition products, and eventually led broadly to the online distribution of travel tickets, concert tickets, books, music, home video, video games, and more. Lawson's endeavor predates that of major competitors 7-Eleven and FamilyMart who introduced similar kiosks in 2000, ultimately expanding the scope of what the convenience stores could do and changing consumer habits on a broad scale.

== History ==
Nintendo utilized Loppi kiosks in a partnership with Lawson from the soft launch to August 31, 2002 for their Nintendo Power cartridge rewriting service for Super Famicom and Game Boy games. During this time, the kiosk featured cartridge readers which consumers used to ascertain memory usage.

In 2000, Lawson purchased over 15,000 Linux servers from IBM, moving away from Microsoft Windows for their backend, and creating the then largest Linux installation in Japan. The in-store kiosks would connect to these servers by May 2002. Starting then, new Loppi kiosks were introduced to stores. These featured a new user interface, the ability to connect with i-mode cell phones, and monochromatic and full-color printers in a partnership with Canon.

Loppi kiosks were introduced into Ministop stores from January to March 2013.

Over time, barcode and QR code readers were implemented into the kiosk. These came to be used for payments and linking with the Ponta loyalty rewards program starting in 2011, ordering Amazon products without an account starting in 2014, processing items listed on sites like Mercari and Yahoo! Auctions for shipping via Japan Post starting on June 20, 2017, and paying one's national taxes starting January 4, 2019.
