= Daikatana (GBC video game) =

2000 video game

- Developer: Will
- Publisher: Kemco
- Director: Takeo Mogi
- Producers: Seijiro Okuhara; Mitsuo Shinjo
- Designers: Takumi Takahashi; Tatsuo Masuda
- Programmers: Kazuyuki Makishima; Tomokazu Yoshida
- Artists: Masayuki Tsuboi; Noboru Matsumura; Hideki Ujiie
- Writers: Noriyuki Saeki; Kazuhiro Takada; Norihiro Onodera
- Composer: Hideki Sakamoto
- Platform: Game Boy Color
- Release: EU: September 29, 2000; JP: May 1, 2001
- Genre: Action-adventure
- Mode: Single-player

Daikatana is a 2000 action-adventure game developed by Will and published by Kemco for the Game Boy Color. It is based on the first-person shooter of the same name, which was released earlier in 2000. Players control a swordsmaster who travels through various time periods in an effort to obtain the eponymous Daikatana, a powerful sword tied to the fate of the world.

Developed separately from the original game, the Game Boy Color version of Daikatana was designed as an adventure game at the request of creator John Romero. It was released in Europe in September 2000 and in Japan as a download for the Nintendo Power peripheral in May 2001; a planned North American release was cancelled due to the original version's negative reputation. The game received generally positive reviews, with critics regarding it as superior to the original Daikatana.

== Gameplay ==
Daikatana features gameplay similar to early entries in The Legend of Zelda series. It has a top-down perspective as opposed to the first-person perspective of its PC and console counterparts. It features dungeons, which have puzzles to solve and bosses to defeat. It features super-deformed character designs.

== Plot ==
Daikatana stars Hiro Miyamoto, who is told that an enemy of his family, Kage Mishima, had stolen the Daikatana with the intention of using its time-warping abilities to change history. Mishima then kidnaps his friend Mikiko and attacks the family dojo.

== Development ==
Daikatana was directed by Takeo Mogi, a freelance designer, who was working as a freelancer for Kemco, the publisher. According to Mogi, a previous game, erroneously identified as a Game Boy Color Quake sidescroller, sold and reviewed poorly, leading to John Romero being dissatisfied and wanting a different direction going into this game. It was designed to resemble The Legend of Zelda for the Nintendo Entertainment System and The Legend of Zelda: Link's Awakening at Romero's request, as well as due to a Kemco staffer wanting to make an action RPG in the same vein as The Legend of Zelda. Mogi played the PC version of Daikatana in order to get ideas for what to include in this game as well as reading the script of the game provided by Romero. Initially, Mogi was planning to draw the kanji incorrectly due to how western depictions of Japan are "often strange to Japanese people," such as mixing up Chinese and Japanese. However, this was dropped, as they sought to avoid being embarrassed if it was pointed out in Nintendo's quality assurance.

It was announced that Kemco would be responsible for publishing the game in the United States. It had a set release date of December 17, 1999, but Kemco said it could be pushed back to January or February 2000. When informed of the planned release of Daikatana for the Game Boy Color in 2000, IGN staff joked that it would end up coming out before the PC version, which was infamous for delays. Other media outlets picked up on this as a story, and Kemco did a press release to clarify that this was not the case. Kemco cancelled its North American release due to the negative reception the brand had received, while the Japanese version was distributed as a download for the Nintendo Power peripheral. An unreleased version of Daikatana was released by Romero on his website.

== Reception ==
The pre-release reception for Daikatana was positive. E3 footage of the game seemed promising to IGN staff, noting that its differences from the PC version were a good thing due to the PC version's issues. They praised the E3 demo's visuals and gameplay, specifically noting that its Japanese-inspired design benefits it. It was the runner-up for IGN's "best handheld adventure" award at E3. GameSpot writer Yukiyoshi Ike Sato compared it to The Legend of Zelda: Link's Awakening and Secret of Mana, noting that the game's demo seemed easy but showed promise.

Daikatana has received generally positive reception and is noted for its high quality, despite the poor critical reception of other versions. It holds a 79.38% on GameRankings. Writer Frank Provo found the game fun, praising the game's puzzles and instant save feature but criticizing its lack of overworld and stiff control. He found the visuals appealing, noting that while the character models lacked color diversity, the world was rich with color and the characters with strong animation. He was more negative towards the sound quality, owing to a limited selection of sound effects and poor use of the GBC's two-channel MIDI. Writer Lucas Sullivan called it a "little GBC gem for those who bothered to give it a chance." Writer Scott Sharkey expressed disappointment in its American cancellation due to it being a better game than its PC/N64 release. He felt that the translation was "wonky" and that the characters were not very different from one another mechanically, but noted that these were ultimately minor issues.
