= Picross S =

Video game series

- Genre: Puzzle
- Developer: Jupiter
- Publisher: Jupiter
- Platform: Nintendo Switch
- First release: Picross S: WW: September 28, 2017
- Latest release: Picross S Konami Antiques Edition: WW: April 30, 2026
- Spin-offs: List of Picross S Spin-offs

Picross S is a series of nonogram puzzle video games developed and published by Jupiter for the Nintendo Switch. It is the current incarnation of Nintendo's Picross series, with Jupiter releasing the games under license. As with all past entries in the series, the game involves the player completing nonograms in the shortest time possible. Picross S is the successor to Jupiter's Picross e series on Nintendo 3DS. The series consists of nine numbered entries, along with several spinoff entries featuring characters from other media properties.

== Games ==
=== Picross S ===
The first game in the series, Picross S was released worldwide on the Nintendo Switch on September 28, 2017, to mixed reception. Reviewers cited its presence of new puzzles as a positive but its blandness and lack of creativity in comparison to past entries as a negative.

=== Picross S2 ===
Picross S2 was released in Japan, Europe, and North America on August 2, 2018. This was the first game to add the Clip Picross feature, which allows players to complete a larger picture by filling out small puzzles. These are unlocked by completing every 5th, 10th, and 15th level of a page. The game was received better than Picross S1, but was still criticized for its lack of innovation.

=== Picross S3 ===
Picross S3 was released in Japan, Europe, and North America on April 25, 2019. It is the highest rated game in the series based on Metacritic review scores. The game was heavily praised for the new Color Picross mode despite only having 30 of the puzzle type. In Color Picross, the picture is determined by the numbers in the top and left of the puzzle, as well as each of the colors being listed in order, leading to more complex and innovative puzzles.

=== Picross S4 ===
Picross S4 was released in Japan, Europe, and North America on April 23, 2020. Picross S4 was generally liked and positively reviewed by critics due to the simple and classic nonogram gameplay, but was criticized for adding no new gameplay modes.

The only new feature is the Extra menu, which gives the player two large 30x30 puzzles. If you have save files for Picross S1, Picross S2, or Picross S3 on your system, you will receive a special 40x30 puzzle for each game you own. The only way to play every puzzle in the game is to own all of the previous games in the series.

=== Picross S5 ===
Picross S5 was released in Japan, Europe, and North America on November 26, 2020. This game retains all the same modes and features of Picross S4, and adds two small "quality of life" features. A High Contrast mode was added for Color Picross, which changes the colors to make them easier to differentiate for colorblind players. The total completion time is displayed when all puzzles in a mode are completed, and for the full game once all modes are completed. These features were added to the four previous games in the series via patches released on the same day.

=== Picross S6 ===
Picross S6 was released in Japan, Europe, and North America on April 22, 2021. This game retains all the same modes and features of Picross S4 and S5. The puzzle grids in Extra Mode now feature alternating colour lines every 5 squares, to make the larger puzzle size easier to parse; this feature was added to Picross S4 and S5 via patches released around the same time.

=== Picross S7 ===
Picross S7 was released in Japan and Hong Kong on December 23, 2021, in Europe and Australia on December 27, 2021, and in North America on January 10, 2022. This game retains all the same modes and features of Picross S4 and S5, and adds touch screen support for handheld mode.

=== Picross S8 ===
Picross S8 was released in Japan, Europe, and North America on September 29, 2022. This game retains all the same modes and features of Picross S4 and S5, and also adds a multiplayer function for up to 4 players at a time.

=== Picross S9 ===
Picross S9 was released in Japan, Europe, and North America on April 27, 2023.

=== Picross S+ ===
Picross S+ was released in Japan, Europe and North America on February 29, 2024. This game features puzzles previously featured in the Picross e series on Nintendo 3DS, with 300 puzzles from the first Picross e title included and titles from later entries available as DLC.

== Spin-offs ==
As with their Picross e series, Jupiter has used the mechanics and UI of Picross S as the basis for a number of licensed spin-off Picross games.

=== Kemono Friends Picross ===
Kemono Friends Picross, based on the Kemono Friends media franchise, was released in Japan, Europe, and North America on 4 October 2018.

=== Picross Lord of the Nazarick ===
Picross Lord of the Nazarick, based on the Overlord anime, was released in Europe and North America on July 25, 2019.

=== Picross S Genesis & Master System edition ===
A crossover installment featuring puzzles based on 59 Sega Genesis and Master System games developed and/or published by Sega, including Sonic the Hedgehog, Alex Kidd and Phantasy Star, was released on August 5, 2021 in Japan, Europe and North America. Also known as Picross S Mega Drive & Mark III edition in Japan and Picross S Mega Drive & Master System edition in Europe, in line with the branding of Sega's 8-bit and 16-bit consoles in those regions.

=== Picross S Namco Legendary edition ===
A crossover installment featuring puzzles based on 30 arcade games developed and/or published by Namco (now Bandai Namco Entertainment), including Galaxian, Pac-Man and Dig Dug, was released on May 30, 2024 in Japan, Europe and North America.

=== Picross Records of the Shield Hero ===
Picross Records of the Shield Hero, based on The Rising of the Shield Hero media franchise, was released in Japan, Europe, and North America on October 3, 2024.

=== Picross S Doraemon & F Characters edition ===
A crossover installment based on 28 manga series written and illustrated by Fujiko F. Fujio, including Doraemon, Kiteretsu Daihyakka and Perman, as well as his science fiction manga for mature audiences. It was released worldwide on March 27, 2025.

=== Picross S Capcom Classics Edition ===
A crossover installment based on 40 arcade and console games from Capcom, including Mega Man, Ghosts 'n Goblins and Street Fighter. It retains the modes of previous entries, along with a new time attack mode, and supports Joy-Con 2 mouse controls when played on Nintendo Switch 2. The game was released worldwide on November 27, 2025.

=== Picross S SNK Classics & NeoGeo Edition ===
A crossover installment based on 50 arcade and NeoGeo games from SNK, including Fatal Fury, Metal Slug and The King of Fighters. It includes all the same features and modes as Capcom Classic Edition, which it released alongside on November 27, 2025.

=== Picross S Konami Antiques Edition ===
A crossover installment based on 80 arcade and console games from Konami, including Castlevania, Contra, and Gradius. Along with previous entries' features, it adds an in-game music player. It was released on April 30, 2026 in Japan, North America and Europe.

== Gameplay ==
In the same fashion as past entries in the series, the games involve the player completing nonograms.

Puzzles included in Picross S series games
Title	Picross/Mega Picross	Clip Picross	Color Picross	Extra Mode	Total Puzzles
Picross S	300	—	—	—	300
Picross S2	300	120	—	—	420
Kemono Friends Picross	300	110	—	—	410
Picross S3	300	150	30	—	480
Picross Lord of the Nazarick	162	330	27	—	519
Picross S4	300	150	30	5	485
Picross S5	300	150	30	5	485
Picross S6	300	150	30	5	485
Picross S Genesis & Master System Edition	300	150	30	—	480
Picross S7	300	150	30	5	485
Picross S8	300	150	30	5	485
Picross S9	300	150	30	5	485
Picross S+	1350 (Note: With all DLC present)	565	10	60	1985
Picross S Namco Legendary Edition	300	250	30	5	585
Picross Records of the Shield Hero	332	175	47	8	562
Picross S Doraemon & F Characters Edition	300	200	30	5	535
Picross S Capcom Classics Edition	300	200	30	5	535
Picross S SNK Classics & NeoGeo Edition	300	200	30	5	535
Picross S Konami Antiques Edition	300	200	30	5	535

== Reception ==
Aggregate review scores
Game	Metacritic
Picross S	67/100
Picross S2	73/100
Picross S3	78/100
Picross S4	77/100
Picross S5	71/100
Picross S6	77/100
Picross S7	80/100
Picross S8	–
Picross S9	–

== See also ==
- Picross, the puzzle series that Picross S is a part of;
- Picross e, the predecessor to the Picross S series, for the Nintendo 3DS;
- Nonogram, the puzzle genre featured in the Picross series.
