= Pokémon Picross =

2015 puzzle video game

- Developer: Jupiter
- Publishers: JP: The Pokémon Company; WW: Nintendo
- Director: Tomohiro Matsui
- Producers: Masayuki Wada; Eisuke Kasejima; Hitoshi Yamagami; Makoto Nakayama
- Artists: Norichika Meguro; Yoshimi Nakajima; Manami Yamazaki
- Composer: Yuka Tsujiyoko
- Series: Pokémon
- Platform: Nintendo 3DS
- Release: JP: December 2, 2015; NA/EU: December 3, 2015
- Genre: Puzzle game
- Mode: Single-player

Pokémon Picross (Note: Japanese: ポケモンピクロス, Hepburn: Pokemon Pikurosu) is a 2015 freemium puzzle video game featuring Pokémon characters developed by Jupiter Corporation and published by Nintendo and The Pokémon Company for the Nintendo 3DS. The title is part of the Picross video game series, in which players solve a series of nonogram puzzles, using numbers on a grid to carve out pictures of Pokémon species.

Originally planned as a 2000 release for the Game Boy Color, the game was cancelled for unknown reasons. 15 years later, Pokémon Picross was revived and announced during a Nintendo Direct presentation. The game would soon after be released as a downloadable title on the Nintendo 3DS eShop worldwide in December 2015. Critics gave "generally favorable" reviews for the game, highlighting its gameplay but criticizing the free-to-play mechanics. Following the closure of the 3DS eShop in March 2023, the game is no longer available for download.

== Gameplay ==
A puzzle in Pokémon Picross, with the solution showcasing a completed picture of Pikachu

The gameplay of Pokémon Picross is primarily based on elements from the Picross games. The game follows the typical format of nonogram puzzles, in which players must use numbers depicted on a grid to determine which sections to fill and not fill in. In this a game a twist is added in which, when a puzzle is completed, players are rewarded with a Pokémon based on the puzzle they cleared. These Pokémon can be set before starting a puzzle and can utilise various abilities based on their type. Abilities can have a range of effects, such as auto-correcting mistakes or stopping the time, to help players solve puzzles easier. Additionally, each puzzle has a set of win conditions related to the Pokémon one has obtained. Each Pokémon has a cooldown period after their ability is used, and their ability may be limited to grids under a certain size, anywhere from 10x10 to 20x15 (the smallest and largest Pokémon puzzle sizes respectively).

The game's freemium elements revolve around items known as Picrites, which are required to perform various actions such as unlocking new areas, increasing the number of Pokémon that can be set, opening up Mega Evolution and Alt World stages, and instantly restoring the Energy gauge (the latter of which is replenished over time). In addition to purchasing them with Nintendo eShop funds, players can obtain Picrites by clearing certain objectives in each stage (such as using a particular Pokémon or beating the stage within a certain time limit), and playing the Daily Challenge (which tasks players with clearing several smaller puzzles in quick succession). Clearing certain stage objectives also unlocks Mural Tiles, which contain individual nonogram puzzles as part of a larger mural puzzle. The game also features a spending cap in which, if the player spends a certain amount of funds (around $30 USD) on Picrites, they will be available for free afterwards.

The game was announced to have 300 stages available to play, and also features an Alt World. In Alt World, puzzles are repeated using Mega Picross rules, which add extra challenges to the puzzle formula, with different ordering and no Picrite rewards. Additionally, the game also features mega-variant puzzles that allow players to capture Mega Evolution versions of Pokémon they've captured.

== Development ==
The title's developer, Jupiter Corporation, had originally planned to release a game called Pokémon Picross on the Game Boy Color 16 years earlier. Although previews appeared in Japanese gaming magazines in Spring 1999, that version was ultimately cancelled. No reason was ever provided for the cancellation, and it was the only Pokémon game to have been cancelled after its announcement. In September 2020, a playable version of the original Game Boy iteration was discovered in the Nintendo "Gigaleak 3" alongside other data and unreleased games.

The 3DS iteration of Pokémon Picross was first announced on a November 12, 2015 Nintendo Direct broadcast, with a worldwide release date set for early the following month. A separate reveal trailer was released as well. A release date for the game was not revealed until November 26, when The Pokémon Company announced a December 3 release on its official Twitter page.

== Reception ==
Reception

Aggregate scores
| Aggregator | Score |
|---|---|
| Metacritic | 75/100 |
| OpenCritic | 33% recommend |

Review scores
| Publication | Score |
|---|---|
| Destructoid | 8/10 |
| Game Informer | 6.75/10 |
| Nintendo Life | 7/10 |
| Nintendo World Report | 8.5/10 |
| Cubed3 | 8/10 |

Pokémon Picross received "generally favorable" reviews, according to video game review aggregator Metacritic. Destructoid found the game to be an improvement over previous Picross entries, stating "Aside from the strangely disguised pricing scheme, the new additions to Pokémon Picross exceed expectations," giving special mention to the ability to complete extra objectives in stages, the unlocking of "mural" images, and the Mega Picross mode encouraging non-standard play. Stephen Totilo of Kotaku gave a high recommendation for the game, calling it a proper mix of the Pokémon and Picross franchises, but criticized the free-to-play mechanics of the game as a "temporary nuisance". Jenni Lada for Siliconera gave the game a favorable review, highlighting the game's features as part of the prospects for future Jupiter-published Picross titles.

Kyle Hilliard of Game Informer found that the game was "difficult to recommend universally", and that the free-to-play mechanic was not conducive to a Picross-style puzzle title, stating "Free-to-play is not inherently a bad thing... but unlike most successful free-to-play games, Picross puzzles are not randomized nor worth replaying." The editor did commend the title for not being an "endless money-sink" by having the in-game currency become free after 5,000 are purchased.

== Legacy ==
While Pokémon Picross and My Nintendo Picross: The Legend of Zelda: Twilight Princess, both Nintendo collaborations, released in quick succession, the games never received another Nintendo-based follow-up, with Jupiter Corporation left to release non-themed Picross games or collaborate with other publishers. In 2023, Norichika Meguro, managing director of Jupiter, stated that while the company wanted to collaborate with Nintendo, it was more difficult than before due to how protective they are of their intellectual property.
