= Jupiter Corporation =

Japanese video game developer

- Native name: 株式会社ジュピター
- Romanized name: Kabushiki-gaisha Jupitā
- Industry: Video games
- Founded: June 11, 1992; 33 years ago
- Founder: Makoto Nakayama
- Headquarters: Fushimi-ku, Kyoto, Japan
- Key people: Makoto Nakayama (President)
- Products: Picross
- Revenue: ¥≈500 million ($≈5.30 million) (2013)
- Website: www.jupiter.co.jp

Jupiter Corporation (Note: Japanese: 株式会社ジュピター, Hepburn: Kabushiki-gaisha Jupitā) is a Japanese video game developer. It is based in Kyoto, though they have a secondary branch in Tokyo. Jupiter is best known for developing Nintendo's Picross series, with the company continuing to develop installments under license from Nintendo.

== Titles ==
=== Super NES ===
- Tamori no Picross
- Mario's Super Picross
- Picross NP
- Satella de Picross

=== Game Boy ===
- J-League Big Wave Soccer
- Mario's Picross
- Nippon Daihyou Team: Eikou no Eleven
- Picross 2
- Pocket Kyoro-chan
- Pocket Kanjiro
- Game Boy Camera

=== Game Boy Color ===
- Dangun Racer
- Pokémon Picross (unreleased)
- Pokémon Pinball
- Sakura Taisen GB
- Sakura Taisen GB2
- Super Robot Pinball

=== Game Boy Advance ===
- Animal Mania
- Croket! Great Jikuu no Boukensha
- Disney Sports Motocross
- Disney's Party
- Erementar Gerad: Tozasareshi Uta
- Kingdom Hearts: Chain of Memories (in cooperation with Square Enix)
- Kessakusen! Ganbare Goemon 1•2: Yukihime to Magginesu
- Sonic Pinball Party (in cooperation with Sonic Team)
- Pokémon Pinball: Ruby & Sapphire
- Wagamama Fairy: Mirumo de Pon! Ougon Maracas no Densetsu

=== Nintendo DS ===
- Croket! DS Tenku no Yushatachi
- Little Charo travels in English!
- Picross DS
- Professor Kageyama's Maths Training
- Spectrobes
- Spectrobes: Beyond the Portals
- The World Ends with You (in cooperation with Square Enix)
- Tinker Bell and the Great Fairy Rescue

=== Nintendo DSi (DSiWare) ===
- Don't Cross the Line

=== Nintendo 3DS ===
- Medarot Dual
- RPG Maker Fes
- Tales of the World: Reve Unitia

=== Nintendo 3DS (Nintendo eShop) ===
- Club Nintendo Picross
- Club Nintendo Picross Plus
- My Nintendo Picross: The Legend of Zelda: Twilight Princess
- Picross e
- Picross e2
- Picross e3
- Picross e4
- Picross e5
- Picross e6
- Picross e7
- Picross e8
- Picross e9
- Pictlogica Final Fantasy (in cooperation with Square Enix)
- Pokémon Picross
- Sanrio Characters Picross

=== Nintendo Switch ===
- Sumikko Gurashi the Movie: The Kingdom of the Sky and the Two Girls Let's Play Characross

=== Nintendo Switch (Nintendo eShop) ===
- Picross S
- Picross S2
- Picross S3
- Picross S4
- Picross S5
- Picross S6
- Picross S7
- Picross S8
- Picross S9
- Picross S: Genesis & Master System Edition
- Picross X: Picbits vs Uzboross
- Kemono Friends Picross
- Picross: Lord of the Nazarick
- Working Zombies
- Fitness Circuit
- Picross S+
- Picross -LogiartGrimoire-
- Picross S: Namco Legendary Edition
- Picross: Records of The Shield Hero
- Picross S: Doraemon & F Characters Edition
- Picross: Juufuutei Raden's Guide for Pixel Museum
- Picross S: Capcom Classics Edition
- Picross S: SNK Classics & NEOGEO Edition
- Picross S: Konami Antiques Edition

=== Pokémon mini ===
- Pokémon Pinball mini
- Pokémon Puzzle Collection
- Pokémon Puzzle Collection vol. 2
- Pokémon Race mini
- Togepi's Great Adventure
- Pokémon Breeder mini

=== Windows ===
- Working Zombies: Steam Edition
- Logiart Grimoire
- Juufuutei Raden's Guide for Pixel Museum

=== PlayStation ===
- NuPa: Numeric Paint Puzzle
- Wagamama Fairy Mirumo de Pon! Mirumo no Mahou Gakkou Monogatari

=== PlayStation 4 ===
- Logiart Grimoire
- Juufuutei Raden's Guide to Pixel Museum

=== Xbox One / Xbox Series X/S ===
- Logiart Grimoire
- Juufuutei Raden's Guide to Pixel Museum
