= Picross =

Video game series

- Genre: Puzzle video game
- Developers: Jupiter Corporation; Ape Inc.; HAL Laboratory
- Publishers: Nintendo; Jupiter Corporation
- Platforms: Game Boy; Super Nintendo Entertainment System; Nintendo DS; Nintendo 3DS; Nintendo Switch; Nintendo Switch 2
- First release: Mario's Picross; March 14, 1995
- Latest release: Picross S: Konami Antiques Edition; April 30, 2026

Picross (Note: Japanese: ピクロス, Hepburn: Pikurosu) is a series of puzzle video games developed by Jupiter Corporation and owned by Nintendo. It features a series of nonogram puzzles solved by the player. The series started in 1995 with Mario's Picross for the Game Boy. After many entries published by Nintendo for multiple platforms, Jupiter started self-publishing Picross games such as the Picross e and Picross S series on the Nintendo 3DS and Nintendo Switch under license from Nintendo.

HAL Laboratory developed the Picross 3D spinoff series, with games on the Nintendo DS and Nintendo 3DS.

== Development ==
Due to the popularity of pen-and-paper nonogram puzzles at the time in Japan, Makoto Nakayama, founder of Jupiter Corporation, pitched a video game version of nonograms to Nintendo. Since Jupiter had little experience in game development, Ape Inc. (known now as Creatures Inc.) assisted with the game's development. Shigeru Miyamoto oversaw the process from Nintendo's side and proposed adding Mario to the game. Mario's Picross was released for the Game Boy in 1995. While it did not take off in the West, it sold well in Japan and led to several Japan-only entries, including Mario's Super Picross for the Super Famicom, Picross 2 for the Game Boy, the Picross NP series for the Super Famicom's Nintendo Power service, and Tamori no Picross for Satellaview. A Picross minigame was planned to be included in Pokémon Gold and Silver during its development, and a Game Boy Color entry in the series known as Pokémon Picross (unrelated to the 2015 video game of the same name) was also in development, although both of these Pokémon projects were scrapped.

Picross DS was the first Picross title in 12 years to be released internationally, launching on the Nintendo DS in 2007. Shortly thereafter, HAL Laboratory, known for the Kirby series, developed Picross 3D for the Nintendo DS. The game used similar mechanics to traditional Picross but adapted them to a three-dimensional environment. The sequel, Picross 3D: Round 2, was released for the Nintendo 3DS in 2015.

After unsuccessfully pitching a Picross DS sequel to Nintendo for the 3DS, Jupiter opted to self-publish Picross games under a licensing deal. They released nine titles and many spin-offs in the Picross e series for the Nintendo 3DS. Jupiter continues to self-publish Picross games on the Nintendo Switch, releasing nine titles and various spin-offs in the Picross S series.

Over the years, Jupiter Corporation has also worked on nonogram video games that are not part of the Picross video game franchise, but were built on the same engine as titles in the series, including NuPa: Numeric Paint Puzzle, Puzzlun, Pictlogica Final Fantasy, Smapic, and Sumikko Gurashi the Movie: The Kingdom of the Sky and the Two Girls Let's Play Characross. Logiart Grimoire and Juufuutei Raden's Guide for Pixel Museum were also created as original nonogram video games for Microsoft Windows (through the Steam digital store), with them later receiving a PlayStation 4, Xbox One, Xbox Series X/S, and Microsoft Windows release (through the Microsoft Store), but for their Nintendo Switch versions, both games use the Picross name with permissions from Nintendo.

== Games ==
Game title	Developer	Publisher	System	Release	Notes	Official site(s)
Mario's Picross	Jupiter Corporation, Ape Inc.	Nintendo	Game Boy	1995	First game in the Picross franchise, and first game in the Mario's Picross series.	(EN) (JP)
Tamori no Picross	Jupiter Corporation, Ape Inc.	Nintendo	Super Famicom (Satellaview)	1995	Broadcast from April 23rd to September 2nd, 1995. Only released in Japan.	
Mario's Super Picross	Jupiter Corporation, Ape Inc.	Nintendo	Super Famicom	1995	Second game in the Mario's Picross series. Originally only released in Japan, later received a European release on Wii, and a worldwide release on Nintendo Switch.	(EN) (JP)
Picross 2	Jupiter Corporation, Creatures Inc.	Nintendo	Game Boy	1996	Last game in the Mario's Picross series. Only released in Japan.	(JP)
Satella de Picross	Jupiter Corporation	Nintendo, St.GIGA	Super Famicom (Satellaview)	1997	Was broadcast on November 30th of 1997, and ran for 27 days. Only released in Japan.	
Picross NP series	Jupiter Corporation, Nintendo	Nintendo	Super Famicom (Nintendo Power)	1999–2000	Series of 8 volumes that released for the Nintendo Power service. Only released in Japan.	(JP)
Picross DS	Jupiter Corporation	Nintendo	Nintendo DS	2007	First Picross game in 12 years to release outside of Japan.	(EN) (JP)
Picross 3D	HAL Laboratory	Nintendo	Nintendo DS	2009	First game not developed by Jupiter Corporation, and first game in the Picross 3D series.	(EN) (JP)
Picross e series	Jupiter Corporation	Jupiter Corporation	Nintendo 3DS	2011–2018	Received nine numbered entries. Picross e is the first Picross game to not be published by Nintendo. Picross e9 only released in Japan.	Picross e: (EN) (JP); Picross e2: (EN) (JP); Picross e3: (EN) (JP); Picross e4: (EN) (JP); Picross e5: (EN) (JP); Picross e6: (EN) (JP); Picross e7: (EN) (JP); Picross e8: (EN) (JP); Picross e9: (JP)
Club Nintendo Picross	Jupiter Corporation	Nintendo	Nintendo 3DS	2012	Given away as reward for the Club Nintendo loyalty program. Only released in Japan and South Korea.	(KO)
Club Nintendo Picross+	Jupiter Corporation	Nintendo	Nintendo 3DS	2014	Given away as reward for the Club Nintendo loyalty program. Only released in Japan.	
Picross 3D: Round 2	HAL Laboratory	Nintendo	Nintendo 3DS	2015	Second game in the Picross 3D series.	(EN) (JP)
Pokémon Picross	Jupiter Corporation	The Pokémon Company	Nintendo 3DS	2015	The first and, so far, only freemium Picross game in the franchise.	(EN) (JP)
My Nintendo Picross: The Legend of Zelda: Twilight Princess	Jupiter Corporation	Nintendo	Nintendo 3DS	2016	Given away as a reward for the My Nintendo loyalty program.	
Picross S series	Jupiter Corporation	Jupiter Corporation	Nintendo Switch (Note: Picross S: Climax was also released on Nintendo Switch 2.)	2017–2026	Received nine numbered entries, plus several themed spin-offs: Picross S: Genesis & Master System Edition (2021)^{(EN) (JP)} — Crossover with properties owned by Sega, such as Sonic the Hedgehog, Bonanza Bros., Puyo Puyo, and Golden Axe; Picross S+ (2024)^{(EN) (JP)} — A compilation of all 9 Picross e games' puzzles; Picross S: Namco Legendary Edition (2024)^{(EN) (JP)} — Crossover with properties owned by Namco, such as Pac-Man, Galaga, Dig Dug, and Mappy; Picross S: Doraemon & F Characters Edition (2025)^{(EN) (JP)} — Crossover with the Doraemon manga series, along with other works by the Japanese manga artist Hiroshi Fujimoto; Picross S: Capcom Classics Edition (2025)^{(EN) (JP)} — Crossover with properties owned by Capcom, such as Street Fighter, Mega Man, and Final Fight; Picross S: SNK Classics & NEOGEO Edition (2025)^{(EN) (JP)} — Crossover with properties owned by SNK, such as The King of Fighters, Fatal Fury, and Metal Slug; Picross S: Konami Antiques Edition (2026)^{(EN) (JP)} — Crossover with properties owned by Konami, such as Castlevania, Metal Gear, and Contra; Picross S: Climax (2026)^{(JP)} — The final game in the Picross S series. A compilation of 1020 carefully curated puzzles from the Picross S numbered entries. It is the only game in the Picross S series to receive a Nintendo Switch 2 release, along with a physical release.	Picross S: (EN) (JP); Picross S2: (EN) (JP); Picross S3: (EN) (JP); Picross S4: (EN) (JP); Picross S5: (EN) (JP); Picross S6: (EN) (JP); Picross S7: (EN) (JP); Picross S8: (EN) (JP); Picross S9: (EN) (JP)
Sanrio characters Picross	Jupiter Corporation	Jupiter Corporation	Nintendo 3DS	2018	Crossover with characters and properties owned by Sanrio such as Hello Kitty, Bad Badtz-Maru, My Melody, and Kirimichan.	(EN) (JP)
Kemono Friends Picross	Jupiter Corporation	Jupiter Corporation	Nintendo Switch	2018	Crossover with the Kemono Friends media franchise.	(EN) (JP)
Picross: Lord of the Nazarick	Jupiter Corporation	Jupiter Corporation	Nintendo Switch	2019	Crossover with the Overlord light novel series.	(EN) (JP)
Picross X: Picbits vs Uzboross	Jupiter Corporation	Jupiter Corporation	Nintendo Switch	2022	Spin-off focusing entirely on solving short 5x5 puzzle grids in quick succession.	(EN) (JP)
Picross -LogiartGrimoire- (Note: Does not carry the Picross branding on releases outside of Nintendo Switch.)	Jupiter Corporation	Jupiter Corporation	Nintendo Switch	2024	Is only considered to be part of the Picross franchise on Nintendo Switch. Originally released on Steam as Early Access on September 12, 2023, and received a PlayStation 4 release on April 24, 2025, along with an Xbox One and Xbox Series X/S release on April 2, 2026.	(EN) (JP)
Picross: Records of The Shield Hero	Jupiter Corporation	Jupiter Corporation	Nintendo Switch	2024	Crossover with The Rising of the Shield Hero multimedia franchise.	(EN) (JP)
Picross: Juufuutei Raden's Guide for Pixel Museum	Jupiter Corporation	Jupiter Corporation	Nintendo Switch	2025	Crossover with Juufuutei Raden, a VTuber affiliated with Hololive Production. Is only considered to be part of the Picross franchise on Nintendo Switch. The game also received a Steam release on the same day as the Nintendo Switch release, along with a PlayStation 4 release on December 11, 2025, and an Xbox One and Xbox Series X/S release on April 2, 2026. The game also received paid downloadable content on June 5, 2026. A Nintendo Switch physical release is also planned to release in December of 2026, which will include both the base game and the paid downloadable content.	Main: (EN) (JP); DLC: (EN) (JP); Package: (JP)

=== Cancelled ===
Game title	Developer	Publisher	System	Revealed	Notes
Pokémon Picross	Jupiter Corporation	Nintendo	Game Boy Color	1999	Originally shown in various Japanese magazines around spring of 1999, the game was cancelled for unknown reasons. The game was later found in a Nintendo data leak in 2020. The game is not directly tied to the game of the same name released for Nintendo 3DS in 2015.
