= Picross 3D =

2009 puzzle video game

- European cover
- Developer: HAL Laboratory
- Publisher: Nintendo
- Directors: Yoshiki Suzuki; Teruyuki Gunji
- Producers: Kensuke Tanabe; Yoichi Yamamoto; Masayoshi Tanimura
- Artist: Benimaru Itoh
- Writer: Kenichi Masuda
- Composers: Yasumasa Yamada; Jun Ishikawa; Hirokazu Ando
- Platform: Nintendo DS
- Release: JP: March 12, 2009; EU: March 5, 2010; NA: May 3, 2010
- Genre: Puzzle
- Mode: Single-player

Picross 3D (Note: Japanese: 立体ピクロス, Hepburn: Rittai Pikurosu) is a puzzle video game developed by HAL Laboratory and published by Nintendo for the Nintendo DS handheld system. It was released in Japan in March 2009, in Europe in March 2010, and in North America in May 2010. It uses similar nonogram mechanics to Picross DS, but adapted to a three-dimensional environment by adding an extra axis blocks can go on. Outside Japan, the game is part of Nintendo's Touch! Generations brand. It was also released for the Wii U's Virtual Console in Europe and Japan in 2016 and North America in 2017. A sequel, Picross 3D: Round 2, was released for the Nintendo 3DS in Japan in October 2015, in North America in September 2016, and in Europe and Australia in December 2016.

== Gameplay ==
A tutorial puzzle in Picross 3D teaches the player how to mark blocks to solve puzzles

While regular nonogram puzzles present a rectangular grid of squares, which must be filled in to create a picture, Picross 3D uses a rectangular prism made of a number of smaller cubes, and must be chipped away in order to construct an image in three dimensions. Each row or column has at most one number corresponding to it, and many do not have any numbers at all; the number indicates how many cubes the row/column should contain when the picture is complete. Generally each row of cubes will be in one group. If a number has a circle around it, it means that, while that number of cubes is the total amount in the row/column, they will be split up into two groups (for example, a 4 with a circle around it will be in two groups of either 1 and 3, or 2 and 2). If a number has a square around it, the cubes will be split up into three or more groups. If there are no numbers on a row or column, there are no rules regarding the cubes in that row.

The game is controlled with a combination of buttons and the touch screen. A paintbrush (right on the D-pad or the Y button) may be used to mark cubes that definitely will remain in the image (which also prevents them from being broken accidentally), or a hammer (up on the D-pad or the X button) to chip away at the unnecessary cubes. If an attempt is made to break a cube that is part of the image, the game will count this as a strike. If the player receives five strikes, the player is out and will have to start the puzzle over again. Players will also need to complete the stage within a certain amount of time. Early on, the game will show players "technique" tutorials to help them refine their puzzle-solving skills.

Once a 3D image is completed, the player will be rewarded with a short animation regarding the image, and it will be placed into a themed collection, encouraging players to complete each collection. During standard puzzles, up to three stars are awarded based on the player's performance (completing the puzzle within a certain time limit and with no strikes earns maximum stars) which unlock additional bonus puzzles in each level. In between certain levels are "One-Chance Challenges", where players are out if they make just one mistake, "Time Challenges", which require players to quickly chip away cubes to extend their time limit, and "Construction Challenges" in which multiple puzzles are completed to form one giant image. Bonus animations can also be unlocked under certain conditions, such as completing each difficulty setting.

The main mode of the game has 350 puzzles for players to complete. Outside of the main mode, players could also download additional puzzles via the Nintendo Wi-Fi Connection, as well as create their own puzzles, which can be shared with friends or entered into themed challenges. While it is no longer possible to use the Nintendo WFC for downloading or sharing puzzles since it was shut down in 2014, it is still possible to send and receive puzzles locally using wireless transfer.

== Release ==
The game was first revealed by Nintendo in February 2009, with an announcement for a March 12 release in Japan and an official website. It was released the following year on March 5th in Europe.

== Reception ==
=== Critical response ===
Reception

Aggregate scores
Aggregator	Score
GameRankings	84.15%
Metacritic	83/100

Review scores
Publication	Score
GameSpot	8.5/10
Nintendo Life	7/10

Picross 3D received "generally favorable" reviews from critics, according to the review aggregation website Metacritic. Ryan Lambie of Nintendo Life gave the game a 7/10; while he suggested that the game failed to match Picross DS in terms of gameplay, it was "a diverting and addictive game" that offered hours worth of content. Nathan Meunier of GameSpot ranked the game at 8.5/10, praising the gameplay but criticizing what he considered to be a "disappointing presentation".

=== Sales ===
The game was the third best-selling game during the week of its release in Japan at 38,000 copies. It sold an additional 24,000 copies and 16,000 copies its second and third weeks respectively.

== Legacy ==
Scott Baird of Screen Rant retrospectively considered Picross 3D to be one of the best DS games in 2017. In March of that same year, the game was added to the Wii U Virtual Console through the Nintendo eShop.

=== Sequel ===
A sequel for the successor Nintendo 3DS system was announced by Nintendo in August 2015. Titled Picross 3D: Round 2, the game was released in Japan in October 2015 and in North America in September the following year.

== See also ==
- Picross, the puzzle series that Picross 3D is a part of
