= Mario's Super Picross =

1995 video game

- Developers: Ape; Jupiter
- Publisher: Nintendo
- Director: Tsunekazu Ishihara
- Producer: Takashi Kawaguchi
- Designer: Agura Tanaka
- Composer: Toshiyuki Ueno
- Series: Mario's Picross
- Platform: Super Famicom
- Release: JP: September 14, 1995
- Genre: Puzzle
- Mode: Single player

Mario's Super Picross (Note: Japanese: マリオのスーパーピクロス, Hepburn: Mario no Sūpā Pikurosu) is a Super Famicom sequel to Mario's Picross, and a part of Nintendo's Picross video game franchise. The game is compatible with the Super Famicom Mouse. It is developed by Jupiter and Ape and published by Nintendo.

== Gameplay ==
Gameplay remains the same as in Mario's Picross, where the player must decipher the picture in each level, progressing to harder and harder puzzles. After completing the first level, the player may also access Wario's puzzles, which present a different challenge due to changes in the gameplay.

In Mario's puzzles, each puzzle is played against a countdown timer. Opposing the tradition of black and white squares, the puzzles are set in stone and are picked out by Mario with a hammer and chisel. When the player solves a puzzle correctly, the black-and-white representation becomes colored and animated, and the game shows the player the title of the puzzle. When the player finishes a level, Mario will congratulate them on their progress and either bow (in the first and last levels) or give a thumbs up (in all other levels). Mario's puzzles also include a hint roulette, which reveals the answer for a randomly selected row and column.

The player must work through levels in order to get access to harder levels, with more rows and columns. In Mario's puzzles, if the player marks an incorrect cell, they receive a time penalty. The amount of time lost doubles for every mistake: one minute, two minutes, four minutes, and finally eight minutes. In Wario's puzzles, the timer counts up from zero instead of counting down, and the player is not penalized for marking an incorrect cell; however, the player is also not notified if they make a mistake, and hint roulettes are not available.

== Release ==
Mario's Super Picross was released for the Super Famicom in Japan on September 14, 1995.

Mario's Super Picross was re-released on the Wii's Virtual Console in Japan in 2006 and in PAL regions on September 14, 2007, marking the first Western release of the game. It was not translated into English for this release. This game was re-released for download on the Wii U's Virtual Console service in both Japan and the PAL regions on April 27, 2013. It was made available worldwide on the Nintendo Classics service in September 23, 2020.

== Reception ==
Reception

Review scores
Publication	Score
Famitsu	8/10, 7/10, 8/10, 8/10
Nintendo Life	9/10
