= List of Nintendo 3DS games (N–Z) =

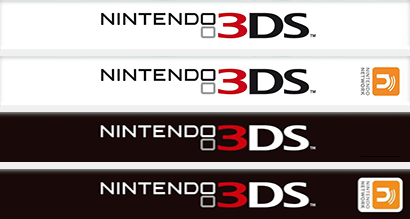
The international white Nintendo 3DS banner used on current and upcoming retail game covers (top). In Japan, the banner is black for Nintendo 3DS games rated by CERO as C or D (bottom). Nintendo Network-compatible games feature a small logo on top of the banner, but as of November 2014, the small Amiibo logo is dominantly featured instead, even if said games also supported Nintendo Network. The Nintendo Network logo will continue to feature if Amiibo support is definitely absent. On actual retail game case covers, the banner is flipped vertically. Game cases for games dedicated exclusively to New Nintendo 3DS (such as Xenoblade Chronicles 3D) feature a different template layout.

This is a list of all the videogames released for the Nintendo 3DS. For games that were announced or in-development, but never released, see the list of cancelled Nintendo 3DS games.

== Games ==
The Nintendo 3DS portable system has a large library of games, which are released in game card and/or digital form. This list does not include downloadable games available via the Virtual Console service. The Nintendo 3DS family is backward compatible with its predecessor, the Nintendo DS line, and its software, including most DSi software. The list is initially organized alphabetically by their English titles or their alphabet conversions, but it is also possible to sort each column individually by clicking the square icon at the top of each column. The Nintendo 3DS system is region locked, meaning that in reality each system has a restricted library of games to select from, depending on the region of the device; the list below displays the availability of games within each of the four regions.

The last first-party game to release for the Nintendo 3DS is Kirby's Extra Epic Yarn, which released in Japan on March 7, 2019, in North America and Europe on March 8, 2019, and in Australasia on March 9, 2019. The last third-party games to release for the Nintendo 3DS are Silver Falls: Gaiden Deathly Delusion Destroyers and Silver Falls: Ruby River, which both released exclusively in North America on the Nintendo eShop on March 9, 2023.

For a chronological list, click the sort button in any of the available regions' column. Games dated February 26, 2011, (Japan), March 25, 2011, (Europe), March 27, 2011, (North America), and March 31, 2011, (Australasia) are the launch titles of each respective region.

There are 1792 games in this table across all pages: 0 to M, and N to Z (Note: This number is always up to date by this script.) games on this list.

List of Nintendo 3DS games
Title	Developer(s)	Publisher(s)	Release date				Ref.
Title	Developer(s)	Publisher(s)	Japan	North America	Australasia	Europe	Ref.
Nanatsu no Taizai: The Seven Deadly Sins - Unjust Sin	Bandai Namco Games	Bandai Namco Games	February 11, 2015	Unreleased	Unreleased	Unreleased	
Nankou Furaku Sangokuden: Shu to Toki no Doujaku	Klon Co., Ltd.	Klon Co., Ltd.	November 28, 2013	Unreleased	Unreleased	Unreleased	
Nankou Furaku Sangokuden: Wei to Ooinaru Sensen	Klon Co., Ltd.	Klon Co., Ltd.	January 29, 2014	Unreleased	Unreleased	Unreleased	
Nankou Furaku Sangokuden: Wu to Ookawa no Eisha	Klon Co., Ltd.	Klon Co., Ltd.	January 29, 2014	Unreleased	Unreleased	Unreleased	
Nano Assault	Shin'en Multimedia	Majesco	December 1, 2011	December 1, 2011	December 1, 2011	December 1, 2011	
Nano Assault EX	Shin'en Multimedia	Shin'en Multimedia	March 7, 2013	March 7, 2013	March 7, 2013	March 7, 2013	
Naruto Powerful Shippuden	Takara Tomy	PAL: 505 Games; WW: Takara Tomy	November 29, 2012	March 5, 2013	March 8, 2013	March 18, 2013	
Naruto Shippūden 3D: The New Era	Takara Tomy	PAL: 505 Games; WW: Takara Tomy	March 31, 2011	Unreleased	June 30, 2011	June 24, 2011	
Nascar Unleashed	Firebrand Games	Activision	Unreleased	November 1, 2011	Unreleased	Unreleased	
Nashijiru Action! Funassyi no Yukai na Ohanassyi	Success	Success	April 30, 2015	Unreleased	Unreleased	Unreleased	
Nashijiru Busha!! Funassyi VS Dragons	Rocket Company	Rocket Company	March 26, 2015	Unreleased	Unreleased	Unreleased	
Navy Commander	Sanuk Games	Bigben Interactive	Unreleased	March 19, 2015	Unreleased	March 19, 2015	
Nazo no Mini-Game: Choigae	Mechanic Arms	Mechanic Arms	January 27, 2016	Unreleased	Unreleased	Unreleased	
Nazo Waku Yakata: Oto no Ma ni Ma ni	Capcom	Capcom	August 4, 2011	Unreleased	Unreleased	Unreleased	
Nazo Waku Yakata: Oto no Ma ni Ma ni Daiichi Wa - Hikarume	Capcom	Capcom	August 4, 2011	Unreleased	Unreleased	Unreleased	
Nazotoki Battle TORE! Densetsu no Makyuu o Fukkatsu Saseyo!	Bandai Namco Games	Bandai Namco Games	October 2, 2014	Unreleased	Unreleased	Unreleased	
NCIS 3D	Ubisoft	Ubisoft	Unreleased	September 18, 2012	October 27, 2011	October 28, 2011	
Need for Speed: The Run	Firebrand Games	Electronic Arts	December 8, 2011	November 15, 2011	November 17, 2011	November 18, 2011	
Nekketsu Kōha Kunio-Kun Special	Avit-Niigata	Arc System Works	December 15, 2011	Unreleased	Unreleased	Unreleased	
Neko Atsume	Hit Point	Hit Point	April 26, 2017	Unreleased	Unreleased	Unreleased	
Neko Neko Nipponshi Rekishi Hakken Puzzle!	FuRyu	FuRyu	May 10, 2017	Unreleased	Unreleased	Unreleased	
Neko Tomo	Bandai Namco Games	Bandai Namco Games	November 21, 2018	Unreleased	Unreleased	Unreleased	
NekoBop	Zachary Kirtz	Zachary Kirtz	Unreleased	April 7, 2022	Unreleased	Unreleased	
NemuNeko Puzzle Demo Netei Masu	FuRyu	FuRyu	January 25, 2017	Unreleased	Unreleased	Unreleased	
Neratte! Tobashite! Rilakkuma GuraGura Sweets Tower	Rocket Company	Rocket Company	December 13, 2012	Unreleased	Unreleased	Unreleased	
New LovePlus	Konami	Konami	February 14, 2012	Unreleased	Unreleased	Unreleased	
New LovePlus+	Konami	Konami	March 24, 2014	Unreleased	Unreleased	Unreleased	
New Super Mario Bros. 2	Nintendo EAD	Nintendo	July 28, 2012	August 19, 2012	August 18, 2012	August 17, 2012	
Nicktoons MLB 3D	Black Lantern Studios	2K Play	Unreleased	March 6, 2012	Unreleased	April 11, 2012	
Nicola Kanshuu: Model * Oshare Audition Platinum	Infinity	Alchemist	November 8, 2012	Unreleased	Unreleased	Unreleased	
NightSky	Nicalis	Nicalis	Unreleased	October 25, 2012	February 21, 2013	February 21, 2013	
Nikaku de Susshi	Arc System Works	Arc System Works	February 13, 2013	Unreleased	Unreleased	Unreleased	
Niko*Puchi Girls Runway	Happinet	Happinet	December 10, 2015	Unreleased	Unreleased	Unreleased	
Nikoli no Puzzle Shikaku	Nikoli	Hamster Corporation	May 23, 2012	Unreleased	Unreleased	Unreleased	
Nikoli no Puzzle Yajirin	Nikoli	Hamster Corporation	April 17, 2013	Unreleased	Unreleased	Unreleased	
Nikoli no Puzzle: Hashi o Kakero	Nikoli	Hamster Corporation	May 9, 2012	Unreleased	Unreleased	Unreleased	
Nikoli no Puzzle: Number Link	Hamster	Hamster	August 28, 2013	Unreleased	Unreleased	Unreleased	
Nikoli no Sudoku 3D Dai-ni-Shuu: 8-tsu no Puzzle de 1000-Mon	Hamster	Hamster	April 12, 2012	Unreleased	Unreleased	Unreleased	
Nikoli's Pencil Puzzle	Hudson Soft	Hudson Soft; Konami	June 2, 2011	October 25, 2011	June 11, 2011	June 10, 2011	
Ninja Battle Heroes	Tom Create	Tom Create	December 5, 2012	October 9, 2014	Unreleased	July 23, 2015	
Ninja JaJaMaru-kun: Sakura-hime to Karyu no Himitsu	Hamster	Hamster	June 20, 2013	Unreleased	Unreleased	Unreleased	
Ninja Smasher	Pumo	Pumo	April 13, 2016	July 21, 2016	Unreleased	July 21, 2016	
Ninja Usagimaru: The Mysterious Karakuri Castle	Aksys Games	JP: Arc System Works; WW: Aksys Games	August 26, 2015	September 29, 2016	Unreleased	September 29, 2016	
Nintendo Pocket Football Club	Parity Bit	Nintendo	July 12, 2012	Unreleased	Unreleased	April 17, 2014	
Nintendogs + Cats: French Bulldog & New Friends	Nintendo EAD	Nintendo	February 26, 2011	March 27, 2011	March 31, 2011	March 25, 2011	
Nintendogs + Cats: Golden Retriever & New Friends	Nintendo EAD	Nintendo	February 26, 2011	March 27, 2011	March 31, 2011	March 25, 2011	
Nintendogs + Cats: Toy Poodle & New Friends	Nintendo EAD	Nintendo	February 26, 2011	March 27, 2011	March 31, 2011	March 25, 2011	
Noah's Cradle	Silver Star Japan	Circle Entertainment	Unreleased	September 22, 2016	Unreleased	September 29, 2016	
Nobunaga no Yabou	Koei Tecmo Games	Koei Tecmo Games	March 19, 2013	Unreleased	Unreleased	Unreleased	
Nobunaga no Yabou 2	Koei Tecmo Games	Koei Tecmo Games	August 6, 2015	Unreleased	Unreleased	Unreleased	
Noesis: Uso o Tsuita Kioku no Monogatari	FuRyu	FuRyu	November 30, 2016	Unreleased	Unreleased	Unreleased	
Noitu Love: Devolution	MP2 Games	MP2 Games	September 15, 2016	September 15, 2016	September 15, 2016	September 22, 2016	
Nuigurumi no Cake-yasan Mini Mahou no Patissier	Culture Brain	Culture Brain	October 29, 2014	Unreleased	Unreleased	Unreleased	
Nuigurumi no Cake-yasan Mahou no Patissier	Culture Brain	Culture Brain	May 23, 2013	Unreleased	Unreleased	Unreleased	
Nurikabe by Nikoli	Nikoli	Hamster Corporation	August 31, 2011	October 11, 2012	Unreleased	Unreleased	
Nyanyanto Mori	Poisoft	Poisoft	August 31, 2016	Unreleased	Unreleased	Unreleased	
Nyoki Nyoki Tabidachi Hen	Compile	Compile	November 16, 2016	Unreleased	Unreleased	Unreleased	
Ocean Runner	Teyon	Teyon	December 16, 2015	January 7, 2016	Unreleased	December 24, 2015	
Ocha-Ken to Itsumo Nakayoshi	Nippon Columbia	Nippon Columbia	December 1, 2011	Unreleased	Unreleased	Unreleased	
Odekake Takorin: Choigae	Mechanic Arms	Mechanic Arms	November 30, 2016	Unreleased	Unreleased	Unreleased	
Oekaki o Kau Soft: CahiEr - Kaikai - Mizusou Version	Sou	Sou	September 28, 2016	Unreleased	Unreleased	Unreleased	
Of Mice and Sand	Arc System Works	Circle Entertainment	September 2, 2016	June 1, 2017	Unreleased	June 8, 2017	
Offroad Driving Simulator4x4: Trucks & SUV Trophy	Game Mavericks	Game Mavericks	Unreleased	March 11, 2021	Unreleased	Unreleased	
Oh! GattiMan Kyuukyoku no Omega Chinpou to Momige 26	Will	Kadokawa	July 22, 2015	Unreleased	Unreleased	Unreleased	
Ohno Odyssey	Gamers Digital	Big John Games	Unreleased	November 21, 2013	Unreleased	Unreleased	
Okiraku Daifugō 3D	Arc System Works	Arc System Works	February 29, 2012	Unreleased	Unreleased	Unreleased	
Okiraku Fishing 3D	Arc System Works	Arc System Works	March 12, 2014	Unreleased	Unreleased	Unreleased	
Okiraku Golf 3D	Arc System Works	Arc System Works	October 24, 2012	Unreleased	Unreleased	Unreleased	
OlliOlli	Roll7	Curve Digital	Unreleased	March 5, 2015	Unreleased	March 20, 2015	
One Piece: Great Pirate Colosseum	Bandai Namco	Bandai Namco Games	September 21, 2016	Unreleased	Unreleased	Unreleased	
One Piece: Romance Dawn	Three Rings	Bandai Namco Games	August 8, 2013	February 11, 2014	November 28, 2013	November 29, 2013	
One Piece: Super Grand Battle! X	Bandai Namco	Bandai Namco Games	November 13, 2014	Unreleased	Unreleased	Unreleased	
One Piece: Unlimited Cruise SP	Ganbarion	Bandai Namco Games	May 26, 2011	Unreleased	Unreleased	February 10, 2012	
One Piece: Unlimited Cruise SP 2	Ganbarion	Bandai Namco Games	May 26, 2011	Unreleased	Unreleased	July 27, 2012	
One Piece: Unlimited World Red	Ganbarion	Bandai Namco Games	November 21, 2013	July 8, 2014	June 26, 2014	June 27, 2014	
Onna Katekiyōshi Itoka Sensei to Misshitsu ni Itara Shichau Kama shirenai	Intense	D3 Publisher	November 28, 2012	Unreleased	Unreleased	Unreleased	
Onnanoko to Misshitsu ni Itara OO Shichau Kamo Shirenai	D3 Publisher	D3 Publisher	March 15, 2012	Unreleased	Unreleased	Unreleased	
Operation Cobra	StickBit	Bidement Entertainment	Unreleased	January 11, 2019	Unreleased	Unreleased	
Order Land!	Poisoft	Poisoft	December 11, 2013	Unreleased	Unreleased	Unreleased	
Order Up!!	SuperVillain Studios	NA: UTV Ignition Entertainment; EU: FunBox Media	Unreleased	June 21, 2012	Unreleased	December 9, 2011	
The Oregon Trail	SVG Distribution	Crave Entertainment	Unreleased	December 13, 2011	Unreleased	Unreleased	
Oresama Kingdom: Ikemen Kareshi o Get Shiyo! Moe Kyun School Days	Racjin	Nippon Columbia	December 13, 2012	Unreleased	Unreleased	Unreleased	
Osawari Tantei Nameko Daihanshoku	BeeWorks	Success	February 28, 2013	Unreleased	Unreleased	Unreleased	
Osawari Tantei Ozawa Rina Rising 3: Nameko wa Banana no Yume o Miru ka?	BeeWorks	Success	May 1, 2014	Unreleased	Unreleased	Unreleased	
Osawari Tantei Ozawa Rina: Nameko Rhythm	Success	Success	November 13, 2014	Unreleased	Unreleased	Unreleased	
Oshaberi Usagi Mechakawa Oshare Collection	Success	Success	December 19, 2013	Unreleased	Unreleased	Unreleased	
Oshare na Koinu 3D	MTO	MTO	December 19, 2013	Unreleased	Unreleased	Unreleased	
Oshigoto Theme Park 2	Culture Brain	Culture Brain	December 20, 2012	Unreleased	Unreleased	Unreleased	
Osomatsu-san Matsu Matsuri!	Bandai Namco Games	Bandai Namco Games	December 20, 2012	Unreleased	Unreleased	Unreleased	
Osomatsu-San Neat Dasshutsu Spiral!!	FuRyu	FuRyu	April 12, 2017	Unreleased	Unreleased	Unreleased	
Otegaru Puzzle Series: Alice to Mahō no Trump	Arc System Works	Arc System Works	October 5, 2011	Unreleased	Unreleased	Unreleased	
Othello 3D	Arc System Works	Arc System Works	June 7, 2011	Unreleased	Unreleased	Unreleased	
Otona VS Greco: Kanji no Tou to Obaketachi - Choimuzu Hen	Media5	Media5	January 22, 2014	Unreleased	Unreleased	Unreleased	
Otona VS Greco: Kanji no Tou to Obaketachi - Gekimuzu Hen	Media5	Media5	January 22, 2014	Unreleased	Unreleased	Unreleased	
Otona VS Greco: Kanji no Tou to Obaketachi - Joushiki Hen	Media5	Media5	January 22, 2014	Unreleased	Unreleased	Unreleased	
Otosan: Nintendo 3DS Edition	William Kage	Seven Silhouettes Enterprises	Unreleased	March 8, 2023	Unreleased	Unreleased	
Ouchi Mainichi Tamagotchi	Bandai Namco Games	Bandai Namco Games	November 22, 2012	Unreleased	Unreleased	Unreleased	
Outback Pet Rescue 3D	Raylight Studios	TREVA Entertainment	Unreleased	August 28, 2014	Unreleased	August 28, 2014	
Outdoors Unleashed: Africa 3D	Teyon	Teyon	November 6, 2013	August 30, 2012	Unreleased	December 7, 2012	
PachiPara 3D: Deluxe Umi Monogataru ~PachiPro Fuuunroku Hana Kotou Shoubushitachi~	Irem	Irem	February 7, 2013	Unreleased	Unreleased	Unreleased	
Pachi Para 3D Ooumi Monogatari 2 ~Pachi Pro Fuuunroku Hana - Kibou to Uragiri no Gakuen Seikatsu~	Irem	Irem	May 17, 2012	Unreleased	Unreleased	Unreleased	
PachiPara 3D: Ooumi Monogatari 2 with Agnes Lum - Pachi-Pro Fuuunroku Hana Kesareta License	Irem	Irem	September 6, 2012	Unreleased	Unreleased	Unreleased	
PachiPara 3D: Premium Umi Monogataru - Yumemiru Otome to Pachinko Ou Ketteisen	Irem	Irem	November 24, 2011	Unreleased	Unreleased	Unreleased	
Pac-Man & Galaga Dimensions	Bandai Namco Games	Bandai Namco Games	June 23, 2011	July 26, 2011	August 25, 2011	August 26, 2011	
Pac-Man Party 3D	Tose	Bandai Namco Games	March 22, 2012	November 8, 2011	February 9, 2012	February 10, 2012	
Pac-Man and the Ghostly Adventures	Inti Creates	Bandai Namco Games	June 19, 2014	November 5, 2013	March 5, 2014	March 5, 2014	
Pac-Man and the Ghostly Adventures 2	Monkey Bar Games	Bandai Namco Games	October 14, 2014	October 14, 2014	October 14, 2013	October 14, 2014	
Paddington: Adventures in London	Neko Entertainment	Anuman Interactive	Unreleased	August 13, 2015	Unreleased	July 2, 2015	
Paper Mario: Sticker Star	Intelligent Systems	Nintendo	December 6, 2012	November 11, 2012	December 8, 2012	December 7, 2012	
Parascientific Escape: Crossing at the Farthest Horizon	Intense	Circle Entertainment	February 22, 2017	July 27, 2017	Unreleased	August 31, 2017	
Parascientific Escape: Cruise in the Distant Seas	Circle Entertainment	Circle Entertainment	July 9, 2014	March 3, 2016	Unreleased	March 3, 2016	
Parascientific Escape: Gear Detective	Intense	Circle Entertainment	December 2, 2015	February 9, 2017	Unreleased	March 2, 2017	
Parking Star 3D	Easytech	CIRCLE Entertainment	Unreleased	May 8, 2014	Unreleased	June 26, 2014	
Paws & Claws: Pampered Pets Resort 3D	Neopica	THQ	Unreleased	March 20, 2012	Unreleased	November 30, 2011	
Pazuru	Moragami	Joindots	February 10, 2015	April 16, 2015	Unreleased	March 26, 2015	
Peakvox Mew Mew Train	Fun Unit	Fun Unit	January 30, 2013	Unreleased	Unreleased	Unreleased	
The Peanuts Movie: Snoopy's Grand Adventure	Beenox	Activision	Unreleased	November 3, 2015	November 6, 2015	November 6, 2015	
Penguin Hop	RCMADIAX	RCMADIAX	Unreleased	July 5, 2018	Unreleased	Unreleased	
Penguin no Mondai: The Wars	Konami	Konami	December 15, 2011	Unreleased	Unreleased	Unreleased	
Penguin no Mondai+ Bakushou! Roulette Battle!!	Alchemist	Alchemist	April 10, 2014	Unreleased	Unreleased	Unreleased	
Penguins of Madagascar	Little Orbit	Little Orbit	Unreleased	November 18, 2014	Unreleased	November 28, 2014	
Percy's Predicament Deluxe	Maestro Interactive	Maestro Interactive	Unreleased	September 14, 2017	Unreleased	Unreleased	
Persona Q: Shadow of the Labyrinth	Atlus	Atlus	June 5, 2014	November 25, 2014	December 4, 2014	November 28, 2014	
Persona Q2: New Cinema Labyrinth	Atlus	Atlus	November 29, 2018	June 4, 2019	June 4, 2019	June 4, 2019	
Pet Hospital	Neopica	Neopica	Unreleased	November 26, 2015	Unreleased	Unreleased	
Pet Inn 3D	Neopica	Neopica	August 3, 2016	January 21, 2016	Unreleased	Unreleased	
Pet Zombies	1st Playable Productions	Majesco	Unreleased	October 18, 2011	Unreleased	Unreleased	
Petit Novel series: Harvest December	Circle Entertainment	Talestune; Flyhigh Works	December 18, 2013	December 10, 2015	Unreleased	December 10, 2015	
Petite Zombies	RandomSpin	RandomSpin	Unreleased	October 18, 2018	Unreleased	October 25, 2018	
Petz Beach	Ubisoft	Ubisoft	December 20, 2012	October 14, 2014	October 30, 2014	October 17, 2014	
Petz Countryside	Ubisoft	Ubisoft	April 18, 2013	October 14, 2014	October 30, 2014	October 17, 2014	
Petz Fantasy 3D	Ubisoft	Ubisoft	Unreleased	June 21, 2011	June 21, 2012	June 22, 2012	
The Phantom Thief Stina and 30 Jewels	Silver Star	Silver Star; Agetec	October 19, 2011	July 19, 2012	Unreleased	June 20, 2013	
Phasmophobia: Hall of Specters 3D	In-D Gaming	In-D Gaming	Unreleased	January 17, 2019	Unreleased	Unreleased	
Phil Taylor's Power Play Darts	Funbox Media	Funbox Media	Unreleased	May 4, 2012	Unreleased	Unreleased	
Phil's Epic Fill-a-Pix Adventure	Lightwood Games	Lightwood Games	December 13, 2017	November 2, 2017	Unreleased	November 2, 2017	
Phineas and Ferb: Quest for Cool Stuff	Behaviour Interactive	NA: Majesco; EU: 505 Games	Unreleased	August 13, 2013	Unreleased	March 7, 2014	
Phoenix Wright: Ace Attorney – Dual Destinies	Capcom	Capcom	July 25, 2013	October 24, 2013	October 24, 2013	October 24, 2013	
Phoenix Wright: Ace Attorney – Spirit of Justice	Capcom	Capcom	June 9, 2016	September 8, 2016	September 8, 2016	September 8, 2016	
Phoenix Wright: Ace Attorney Trilogy	Capcom	Capcom	April 17, 2014	December 9, 2014	December 12, 2014	December 11, 2014	
Physical Contact: 2048	Collavier	Collavier Corporation	September 28, 2017	November 2, 2017	Unreleased	October 12, 2017	
Physical Contact: Picture Place	Collavier	Collavier Corporation	October 18, 2017	November 23, 2017	Unreleased	October 12, 2017	
Physical Contact: Speed	Collavier	Collavier Corporation	September 28, 2017	November 2, 2017	Unreleased	October 12, 2017	
Pic-a-Pix Color	Lightwood Games	Lightwood Games	September 6, 2017	April 13, 2017	Unreleased	March 30, 2017	
Picdun 2: Witch's Curse	Intense	Intense	August 22, 2012	February 21, 2013	Unreleased	May 2, 2013	
Pick-A-Gem	Gamelion Studios	Gamelion Studios	Unreleased	April 24, 2014	Unreleased	July 17, 2014	
Pictlogica Final Fantasy	Square Enix	Square Enix	July 12, 2017	Unreleased	Unreleased	Unreleased	
Picross 3D: Round 2	HAL Laboratory	Nintendo	October 1, 2015	September 1, 2016	December 3, 2016	December 2, 2016	
Picross e	Jupiter Corporation	Jupiter Corporation	July 27, 2011	June 13, 2013	Unreleased	September 6, 2012	
Picross e2	Jupiter Corporation	Jupiter Corporation	December 28, 2011	July 25, 2013	Unreleased	January 24, 2013	
Picross e3	Jupiter Corporation	Jupiter Corporation	June 12, 2013	October 3, 2013	Unreleased	November 14, 2013	
Picross e4	Jupiter Corporation	Jupiter Corporation	November 20, 2013	May 1, 2014	Unreleased	May 22, 2014	
Picross e5	Jupiter Corporation	Jupiter Corporation	June 11, 2014	November 13, 2014	November 13, 2014	November 13, 2014	
Picross e6	Jupiter Corporation	Jupiter Corporation	December 24, 2014	August 6, 2015	Unreleased	July 30, 2015	
Picross e7	Jupiter Corporation	Jupiter Corporation	April 27, 2016	December 15, 2016	Unreleased	December 22, 2016	
Picross e8	Jupiter Corporation	Jupiter Corporation	December 20, 2017	December 21, 2017	Unreleased	January 18, 2018	
Picross e9	Jupiter Corporation	Jupiter Corporation	August 8, 2018	Unreleased	Unreleased	Unreleased	
Pika Pika Nurse Monogatari 2	Nippon Columbia	Nippon Columbia	November 22, 2012	Unreleased	Unreleased	Unreleased	
Pika Pika Nurse Monogatari Shounika wa itsumo Oosawagi	Nippon Columbia	Nippon Columbia	November 10, 2016	Unreleased	Unreleased	Unreleased	
Pilotwings Resort	Monster Games; Nintendo SPD	Nintendo	April 14, 2011	March 27, 2011	April 14, 2011	March 25, 2011	
Pinball Breaker	nuGAME	nuGAME	Unreleased	February 14, 2019	Unreleased	February 14, 2019	
Pinball Breaker 2	nuGAME	nuGAME	Unreleased	June 13, 2019	Unreleased	July 4, 2019	
Pinball Breaker 3	nuGAME	nuGAME	Unreleased	June 27, 2019	Unreleased	July 25, 2019	
Pinball Breaker 4	nuGAME	nuGAME	Unreleased	August 29, 2019	Unreleased	September 19, 2019	
Pinball Breaker V	nuGAME	nuGAME	Unreleased	November 14, 2019	Unreleased	November 14, 2019	
Pinball Breaker VI	nuGAME	nuGAME	Unreleased	January 23, 2020	Unreleased	February 6, 2020	
Pinball Breakout	nuGAME	nuGAME	Unreleased	October 4, 2018	Unreleased	October 4, 2018	
Pinball Breakout 2	nuGAME	nuGAME	Unreleased	November 15, 2018	Unreleased	November 15, 2018	
Pinball Breakout 3	nuGAME	nuGAME	Unreleased	July 18, 2019	Unreleased	August 1, 2019	
Pinball Breakout 4	nuGAME	nuGAME	Unreleased	October 3, 2019	Unreleased	Unreleased	
Pinball Hall of Fame: The Williams Collection	FarSight Studios	Crave Entertainment	Unreleased	September 13, 2011	Unreleased	Unreleased	
Ping Pong Trick Shot	Sims	Starsign	November 5, 2014	September 1, 2016	Unreleased	October 20, 2016	
Ping Pong Trick Shot 2	Starsign	Starsign	July 8, 2015	April 20, 2017	Unreleased	Unreleased	
Pink Dot Blue Dot	RCMADIAX	RCMADIAX	Unreleased	March 9, 2017	March 9, 2017	March 9, 2017	
Pippi Longstocking 3D	Ravn Studio	Pan Vision	Unreleased	Unreleased	Unreleased	November 2, 2012	
Pirate Pop Plus	Dadako Studios	JP: Rainy Frog; WW: 13AM Games	February 22, 2017	October 20, 2016	October 21, 2016	October 20, 2016	
Pix 3D	Gamelion	JP: Teyon; WW: Gamelion	April 17, 2013	December 20, 2012	Unreleased	November 22, 2012	
Pixel Hunter	Lemondo Games	Lemondo Games	Unreleased	October 6, 2016	Unreleased	May 11, 2017	
Plain Video Poker	PouncingKitten	PouncingKitten	Unreleased	June 26, 2014	Unreleased	Unreleased	
Planes	Behaviour Interactive	Disney Interactive Studios	Unreleased	August 6, 2013	September 5, 2013	August 16, 2013	
Planes: Fire & Rescue	Game Machine Studios	Little Orbit	Unreleased	November 4, 2014	November 6, 2014	November 7, 2014	
Planet Crashers	Renegade Kid	Ignition Entertainment	Unreleased	July 26, 2012	Unreleased	July 26, 2012	
Plantera	Ratalaika Games	JP: Rainy Frog; WW: Ratalaika Games	February 1, 2017	February 9, 2017	Unreleased	February 9, 2017	
Pocket Card Jockey	Game Freak	Game Freak	May 5, 2016	May 5, 2016	May 5, 2016	May 5, 2016	
Pokémon Alpha Sapphire	Game Freak	Nintendo; The Pokémon Company	November 21, 2014	November 21, 2014	November 21, 2014	November 28, 2014	
Pokémon Battle Trozei	Genius Sonority	Nintendo; The Pokémon Company	March 12, 2014	March 20, 2014	March 14, 2014	March 13, 2014	
Pokémon Dream Radar	Game Freak - Creatures	Nintendo; The Pokémon Company	June 12, 2012	October 7, 2012	October 11, 2012	October 12, 2012	
Pokémon Moon	Game Freak	Nintendo; The Pokémon Company	November 18, 2016	November 18, 2016	November 18, 2016	November 23, 2016	
Pokémon Mystery Dungeon: Gates to Infinity	Spike Chunsoft	Nintendo; The Pokémon Company	November 23, 2012	March 24, 2013	May 18, 2013	May 17, 2013	
Pokémon Omega Ruby	Game Freak	Nintendo; The Pokémon Company	November 21, 2014	November 21, 2014	November 21, 2014	November 28, 2014	
Pokémon Picross	Jupiter Corporation	Nintendo; The Pokémon Company	December 2, 2015	December 3, 2015	December 4, 2015	December 3, 2015	
Pokémon Rumble Blast	Ambrella	Nintendo; The Pokémon Company	August 11, 2011	October 24, 2011	December 8, 2011	December 2, 2011	
Pokémon Rumble World	Ambrella	Nintendo; The Pokémon Company	April 8, 2015	April 8, 2015	April 8, 2015	April 8, 2015	
Pokémon Shuffle	Genius Sonority	Nintendo; The Pokémon Company	February 18, 2015	February 18, 2015	February 18, 2015	February 18, 2015	
Pokémon Sun	Game Freak	Nintendo; The Pokémon Company	November 18, 2016	November 18, 2016	November 18, 2016	November 23, 2016	
Pokémon Super Mystery Dungeon	Spike Chunsoft	Nintendo; The Pokémon Company	September 17, 2015	November 20, 2015	February 20, 2016	February 19, 2016	
Pokémon Ultra Moon	Game Freak	Nintendo; The Pokémon Company	November 17, 2017	November 17, 2017	November 17, 2017	November 17, 2017	
Pokémon Ultra Sun	Game Freak	Nintendo; The Pokémon Company	November 17, 2017	November 17, 2017	November 17, 2017	November 17, 2017	
Pokémon X	Game Freak	Nintendo; The Pokémon Company	October 12, 2013	October 12, 2013	October 12, 2013	October 12, 2013	
Pokémon Y	Game Freak	Nintendo; The Pokémon Company	October 12, 2013	October 12, 2013	October 12, 2013	October 12, 2013	
Polara	Circle Entertainment	Circle Entertainment	April 13, 2012	September 15, 2016	Unreleased	September 22, 2016	
Pom Pom Purin: Korokoro Daibouken	Rocket Company	Rocket Company	April 7, 2016	Unreleased	Unreleased	Unreleased	
Pong Pong Candy	Lionant	Lionant	Unreleased	February 12, 2015	Unreleased	Unreleased	
Poochy & Yoshi's Woolly World	Good-Feel	Nintendo	January 19, 2017	February 3, 2017	February 4, 2017	February 3, 2017	
Poptropica: Forgotten Islands	Ubisoft	Ubisoft	Unreleased	October 14, 2014	Unreleased	Unreleased	
Power Disc Slam	Chequered Cow Games	Chequered Cow Games	January 25, 2017	August 18, 2016	Unreleased	July 28, 2016	
Power Rangers Megaforce	Digital Works Entertainment	Bandai Namco Games	Unreleased	November 5, 2013	November 28, 2013	November 29, 2013	
Power Rangers Super Megaforce	Bandai Namco Games	Bandai Namco Games	Unreleased	October 28, 2014	Unreleased	October 24, 2014	
Poyo Poyo Kansatsu Nikki	Mechanic Arms	IE Institute	April 5, 2012	Unreleased	Unreleased	Unreleased	
Pretty Rhythm: My Deco Rainbow Wedding	Takara Tomy	Takara Tomy	March 20, 2013	Unreleased	Unreleased	Unreleased	
Pretty Rhythm: Rainbow Live: Kirakira My Design	Takara Tomy	Takara Tomy	November 28, 2013	Unreleased	Unreleased	Unreleased	
Prince of Tennis: Go to the Top	FuRyu	FuRyu	March 5, 2015	Unreleased	Unreleased	Unreleased	
PriPara & Pretty Rhythm: PriPara de Tsukaeru Oshare Item 1450!	Takara Tomy	Takara Tomy	January 5, 2015	Unreleased	Unreleased	Unreleased	
PriPara Mezameyo! Megami no Dress Design	Takara Tomy	Takara Tomy	November 10, 2016	Unreleased	Unreleased	Unreleased	
PriPara Mezase! Idol * Grand Prix No.1!	Takara Tomy	Takara Tomy	October 22, 2015	Unreleased	Unreleased	Unreleased	
PriPri Chi-chan!	Konami	Konami	November 16, 2017	Unreleased	Unreleased	Unreleased	
Pro Evolution Soccer 2011	Konami	Konami	February 26, 2011	March 27, 2011	March 31, 2011	March 27, 2011	
Pro Evolution Soccer 2012	Konami	Konami	December 8, 2011	February 21, 2012	December 1, 2011	December 1, 2011	
Pro Evolution Soccer 2013	Konami	Konami	November 1, 2012	February 12, 2013	December 13, 2012	November 29, 2012	
Pro Evolution Soccer 2014	PES Productions	Konami	November 14, 2013	Unreleased	Unreleased	Unreleased	
Pro Yakyuu Famista 2011	Now Production	Namco Bandai Games	March 31, 2011	Unreleased	Unreleased	Unreleased	
Pro Yakyuu Famista Climax	Namco Bandai Games	Namco Bandai Games	April 20, 2017	Unreleased	Unreleased	Unreleased	
Pro Yakyuu Famista Returns	Eighting	Bandai Namco Games	October 8, 2015	Unreleased	Unreleased	Unreleased	
Pro Yakyuu Spirits 2011	Konami	Konami	April 14, 2011	Unreleased	Unreleased	Unreleased	
Professor Layton and the Azran Legacy	Level-5	JP: Level-5; WW: Nintendo	February 28, 2013	February 28, 2014	November 9, 2013	November 8, 2013	
Professor Layton and the Miracle Mask	Level-5	JP: Level-5; WW: Nintendo	February 26, 2011	October 28, 2012	October 27, 2012	October 26, 2012	
Professor Layton vs. Phoenix Wright: Ace Attorney	Level-5; Capcom	JP: Level-5; WW: Nintendo	November 29, 2012	August 29, 2014	March 29, 2014	March 28, 2014	
Project X Zone	Monolith Soft	Bandai Namco Games	October 11, 2012	June 25, 2013	July 4, 2013	July 5, 2013	
Project X Zone 2	Monolith Soft	Bandai Namco Entertainment	November 12, 2015	February 16, 2016	February 12, 2016	February 12, 2016	
Proun+	Engine Software	JP: Rainy Frog; WW: Engine Software	June 10, 2015	March 5, 2015	Unreleased	March 5, 2015	
Psycho Pigs	Bergsala Lightweight	JP: Mechanic Arms; WW: Bergsala Lightweight	August 19, 2015	October 6, 2016	Unreleased	July 28, 2016	
Puchicon Magazine: Soukangou	SmileBoom	SmileBoom	July 29, 2015	Unreleased	Unreleased	Unreleased	
Puchi Novel: Betsuri no Juuichigatsu	talestune	Flyhigh Works	November 19, 2014	Unreleased	Unreleased	Unreleased	
Puchi Novel: Hadan no Juugatsu	talestune	Flyhigh Works	October 22, 2014	Unreleased	Unreleased	Unreleased	
Puchi Novel: Kongi no Rokugatsu	talestune	Flyhigh Works	June 25, 2014	Unreleased	Unreleased	Unreleased	
Puchi Novel: Kyouiki no Ichigatsu	talestune	Flyhigh Works	January 29, 2014	Unreleased	Unreleased	Unreleased	
Puchi Novel: Renren no Sangatsu	talestune	Flyhigh Works	March 19, 2014	Unreleased	Unreleased	Unreleased	
Puchi Novel: Seiran no Shigatsu	talestune	Flyhigh Works	April 23, 2014	Unreleased	Unreleased	Unreleased	
Puchi Novel: Shikyuu no Kugatsu	talestune	Flyhigh Works	September 24, 2014	Unreleased	Unreleased	Unreleased	
Puchi Novel: Shingaku no Shichigatsu	talestune	Flyhigh Works	July 16, 2014	Unreleased	Unreleased	Unreleased	
Puchi Novel: Shukusai no Hachigatsu	talestune	Flyhigh Works	August 27, 2014	Unreleased	Unreleased	Unreleased	
Puchi Novel: Shuuren no Juunigatsu	talestune	Flyhigh Works	December 24, 2014	Unreleased	Unreleased	Unreleased	
Puchi Novel: Tatageki no Gogatsu	talestune	Flyhigh Works	May 21, 2014	Unreleased	Unreleased	Unreleased	
Puchi Novel: Zouyo no Nigatsu	talestune	Flyhigh Works	February 26, 2014	Unreleased	Unreleased	Unreleased	
Punch Club	TinyBuild	TinyBuild	Unreleased	January 19, 2017	Unreleased	February 2, 2017	
Puppies 3D	MTO	Ubisoft	December 15, 2011	November 8, 2011	June 14, 2012	November 11, 2011	
Pure Chess	Ripstone	Ripstone	Unreleased	March 20, 2014	Unreleased	March 20, 2014	
Purr Pals: Purrfection	Brain Toys	THQ	Unreleased	May 12, 2012	May 24, 2012	May 25, 2012	
Pushmo •Pullblox^{PAL}	Intelligent Systems	Nintendo	October 5, 2011	December 8, 2011	December 8, 2011	December 8, 2011	
Putty Squad	System 3	Maximum Games	Unreleased	May 20, 2014	April 17, 2014	April 25, 2014	
Puyo Puyo!! 20th Anniversary	Sonic Team	Sega	December 15, 2011	Unreleased	Unreleased	Unreleased	
Puyo Puyo Chronicle	Sonic Team	Sega	December 8, 2016	Unreleased	Unreleased	Unreleased	
Puyo Puyo Mini	Sonic Team	Sega	November 7, 2012	Unreleased	Unreleased	Unreleased	
Puyo Puyo Tetris	Sonic Team	Sega	February 6, 2014	Unreleased	Unreleased	Unreleased	
Puzzle & Dragons X: Kami no Shou	GungHo Online Entertainment	GungHo Online Entertainment	July 28, 2016	Unreleased	Unreleased	Unreleased	
Puzzle & Dragons X: Ryuu no Shou	GungHo Online Entertainment	GungHo Online Entertainment	July 28, 2016	Unreleased	Unreleased	Unreleased	
Puzzle & Dragons Z	GungHo Online Entertainment	GungHo Online Entertainment	December 12, 2013	Unreleased	Unreleased	Unreleased	
Puzzle & Dragons: Super Mario Bros. Edition	GungHo Online Entertainment	GungHo Online Entertainment	April 29, 2015	Unreleased	Unreleased	Unreleased	
Puzzle Labyrinth	Circle Entertainment	Circle Entertainment	October 21, 2015	June 9, 2016	Unreleased	June 9, 2016	
PUZZLEBOX setup	Bplus	Bplus	Unreleased	December 25, 2014	Unreleased	December 25, 2014	
Puzzler Brain Games	Bplus	Bplus	Unreleased	April 23, 2013	Unreleased	Unreleased	
Puzzler Mind Gym 3D	Ubisoft	Ubisoft	Unreleased	September 13, 2011	November 18, 2011	November 11, 2011	
Puzzler World 2012 3D	Ubisoft	Ubisoft	Unreleased	September 25, 2012	September 29, 2012	September 28, 2012	
Puzzler World 2013	Ideas Pad	Maximum Games	Unreleased	April 23, 2013	Unreleased	November 30, 2012	
Pyramids	Visual Impact	Enjoy Gaming	September 24, 2014	October 27, 2011	Unreleased	October 20, 2011	
Pyramids 2	Enjoy Gaming	Enjoy Gaming	Unreleased	October 16, 2014	Unreleased	Unreleased	
Q	liica, Inc.	liica, Inc.	November 18, 2015	Unreleased	Unreleased	Unreleased	
Quarters, Please!	Nostatic Software	Nostatic Software	Unreleased	September 5, 2019	Unreleased	October 10, 2019	
Quarters, Please! Vol. 2	Nostatic Software	Nostatic Software	Unreleased	February 6, 2020	Unreleased	February 13, 2020	
The Queen TV-Game 2	Butterfly	Batafurai	Unreleased	November 26, 2020	Unreleased	January 31, 2022	
Quell Memento	FK Digital	CIRCLE Entertainment	Unreleased	December 15, 2015	Unreleased	April 9, 2015	
Quell Reflect	FK Digital	CIRCLE Entertainment	Unreleased	February 20, 2014	Unreleased	July 3, 2014	
Quest of Dungeons	Upfall Studios	Upfall Studios	November 16, 2016	September 29, 2016	Unreleased	September 29, 2016	
The Quiet Collection	Nostatic Software	Nostatic Software	Unreleased	January 5, 2017	Unreleased	January 5, 2017	
Quiet, Please!	Nostatic Software	Nostatic Software	Unreleased	January 5, 2017	Unreleased	January 5, 2017	
Radiant Historia: Perfect Chronology	Atlus	Atlus	June 29, 2017	February 13, 2018	Unreleased	February 16, 2018	
Rabbids Rumble	Headstrong Games	Ubisoft	Unreleased	November 13, 2012	November 15, 2012	November 16, 2012	
Rabbids: Travel in Time 3D	Ubisoft	Ubisoft	March 24, 2011	April 10, 2011	March 31, 2011	April 1, 2011	
Rabi Laby 3	Silver Star	JP: Silver Star; WW: Agetec	January 11, 2012	July 10, 2014	August 7, 2014	August 7, 2014	
Radiohammer	Arc System Works	Aksys Games	April 8, 2015	December 10, 2015	Unreleased	January 21, 2016	
Radirgy de Gojaru!	Klon	Klon	February 19, 2014	Unreleased	Unreleased	Unreleased	
Rage of the Gladiator	Ghostfire Games	Gamelion Studios	Unreleased	September 19, 2013	Unreleased	September 19, 2013	
Rainbow Snake	RandomSpin	RandomSpin	Unreleased	June 7, 2018	Unreleased	May 10, 2018	
Raining Coins	Crazysoft	Crazysoft	Unreleased	January 18, 2018	Unreleased	January 18, 2018	
Raishi	Klon Co., Ltd.	Klon Co., Ltd.	April 9, 2015	Unreleased	Unreleased	Unreleased	
Raishi Konpeki no Syou	Klon Co., Ltd.	Klon Co., Ltd.	April 7, 2016	Unreleased	Unreleased	Unreleased	
Rayman 3D	Ubisoft	Ubisoft	Unreleased	March 27, 2011	March 31, 2011	March 25, 2011	
Rayman Origins	Ubisoft Montpellier	Ubisoft	July 19, 2012	November 6, 2012	June 14, 2012	June 8, 2012	
Real Escape Game x Nintendo 3DS: Escape from the Plan of Mega Destruction	Scrap Co., Ltd	Nintendo	July 31, 2015	Unreleased	Unreleased	Unreleased	
Real Heroes: Firefighter 3D	Epicenter Studios	Conspiracy Entertainment	Unreleased	August 10, 2012	February 14, 2013	November 30, 2012	
Reel Fishing Paradise 3D	Natsume Co., Ltd.	Natsume Inc.	Unreleased	June 28, 2011	November 24, 2011	January 20, 2012	
Reel Fishing Paradise 3D Mini	Natsume Co., Ltd.	Natsume Inc.	Unreleased	January 10, 2013	Unreleased	May 9, 2013	
Regular Show: Mordecai and Rigby in 8-Bit Land	WayForward Technologies	NA: D3 Publisher; WW: Bandai Namco Games	Unreleased	October 29, 2013	November 12, 2013	November 8, 2013	
Resident Evil: Revelations	TOSE	Capcom	January 26, 2012	February 7, 2012	February 2, 2012	January 27, 2012	
Resident Evil: The Mercenaries 3D	TOSE	Capcom	June 2, 2011	June 28, 2011	June 30, 2011	June 30, 2011	
Retro City Rampage DX	Vblank Entertainment	Vblank Entertainment	Unreleased	February 6, 2014	April 3, 2014	February 20, 2014	
Return to PopoloCrois: A Story of Seasons Fairytale	Epics; Marvelous AQL	JP: Marvelous AQL; WW: Xseed Games	June 18, 2015	March 1, 2016	February 18, 2016	February 18, 2016	
Rhythm Heaven Megamix	Nintendo SPD	Nintendo	June 11, 2015	June 15, 2016	October 22, 2016	October 21, 2016	
Rhythm Thief & the Emperor's Treasure	Sega; Xeen	Sega	January 19, 2012	July 10, 2012	April 12, 2012	April 5, 2012	
Ridge Racer 3D	Bandai Namco Games; Xeen	Bandai Namco Games	February 26, 2011	March 27, 2011	March 31, 2011	March 25, 2011	
Riding Stables 3D: Rivals in the Saddle	Treva Entertainment	Treva Entertainment	Unreleased	December 20, 2012	Unreleased	April 25, 2013	
Riding Stables: The Whitakers present Milton and Friends	Koch Media	DTP Entertainment	Unreleased	Unreleased	Unreleased	February 17, 2012	
Riding Star 3D	Raylight Studios	TREVA Entertainment	Unreleased	October 9, 2014	Unreleased	Unreleased	
Riki Densetsu	Arc System Works	Arc System Works	December 12, 2012	Unreleased	Unreleased	Unreleased	
Rilakkuma Nakayoshi Collection	Rocket Company	Rocket Company	December 18, 2014	Unreleased	Unreleased	Unreleased	
Rilu Rilu Fairilu: Kirakira☆Hajimete no Fairilu Magic ♪	FuRyu	FuRyu	November 10, 2016	Unreleased	Unreleased	Unreleased	
Rise of the Guardians: The Video Game	Torus Games	NA: D3 Publisher; WW: Bandai Namco Games	Unreleased	November 20, 2012	November 29, 2012	November 20, 2012	
Rising Board 3D	Odenis Studio	Odenis Studio	Unreleased	September 20, 2012	Unreleased	November 8, 2012	
River City: Knights of Justice	Avit-Niigata	Natsume Inc.	April 30, 2014	June 20, 2017	Unreleased	June 22, 2017	
River City: Rival Showdown	Arc System Works; Aplus	Arc System Works; Natsume Inc.	October 27, 2016	November 21, 2017	Unreleased	November 21, 2017	
River City: Tokyo Rumble	Aplus	Arc System Works; Natsume Inc.	August 8, 2013	September 27, 2016	Unreleased	September 27, 2016	
Robot Rescue 3D	Teyon	Teyon	Unreleased	July 18, 2013	Unreleased	July 18, 2013	
Rodea the Sky Soldier	Prope	Kadokawa Shoten	April 2, 2015	November 10, 2015	November 19, 2015	November 13, 2015	
RollerCoaster Tycoon 3D	n-Space	Atari	Unreleased	October 16, 2012	October 25, 2012	October 26, 2012	
RPG Maker Fes	Kadokawa Games	JP: Kadokawa Games; WW: NIS America	November 24, 2016	June 27, 2017	June 30, 2017	June 23, 2017	
RTO	nuGAME	nuGAME	Unreleased	November 9, 2017	Unreleased	November 9, 2017	
RTO 2	nuGAME	nuGAME	Unreleased	November 22, 2018	Unreleased	November 22, 2018	
RTO 3	nuGAME	nuGAME	Unreleased	January 3, 2019	Unreleased	January 3, 2019	
Rubik's Cube	Cypronia	Cypronia	Unreleased	June 23, 2016	Unreleased	June 23, 2016	
Run for Money Tousouchuu (run For Money)	Bandai Namco Games	Bandai Namco Games	July 5, 2012	Unreleased	Unreleased	Unreleased	
Runabout 3D: Drive Impossible • Crash City Mayhem^{EU}	Rocket Company	Majesco	January 19, 2012	July 2, 2013	Unreleased	February 22, 2013	
Runbow Pocket	13AM Games	13AM Games	Unreleased	June 20, 2017	Unreleased	June 20, 2017	
Rune Factory 4	Neverland	NA: Xseed Games; WW: Marvelous AQL	July 19, 2012	October 1, 2013	December 11, 2014	December 11, 2014	
Runny Egg	Tom Create	Tom Create	Unreleased	April 9, 2015	Unreleased	January 28, 2016	
Rusty's Real Deal Baseball	Nintendo	Nintendo	Unreleased	April 2, 2014	Unreleased	Unreleased	
RV-7 My Drone	EnjoyUp Games	EnjoyUp Games	March 30, 2016	January 28, 2016	Unreleased	January 7, 2016	
Sadame	Rising Star Games	Rising Star Games	December 17, 2014	February 25, 2016	February 26, 2016	February 25, 2016	
Safari Quest	rokapublish GmbH	Maximum Games	Unreleased	November 11, 2014	Unreleased	Unreleased	
Saiki Kusuo no Psi-nan: Shijou Psi Dai no Psi-nan!?	Bandai Namco Games	Bandai Namco Games	November 10, 2016	Unreleased	Unreleased	Unreleased	
Sakura Samurai: Art of the Sword	Nintendo	Nintendo	November 16, 2011	February 2, 2012	October 11, 2012	October 11, 2012	
Samurai Defender	Flyhigh Works; Link Kit	Circle Entertainment	March 25, 2015	May 21, 2015	Unreleased	May 26, 2016	
Samurai G	UFO Interactive Games	UFO Interactive Games	Unreleased	October 4, 2012	Unreleased	November 1, 2012	
Samurai Sword Destiny	UFO Interactive Games	JP: Cyberfront; WW: UFO Interactive Games	December 26, 2012	January 5, 2012	Unreleased	June 14, 2012	
Samurai Warriors: Chronicles	Omega Force	Tecmo Koei	February 26, 2011	March 27, 2011	March 31, 2011	March 25, 2011	
Samurai Warriors Chronicles 2	Omega Force	Tecmo Koei	September 13, 2012	Unreleased	Unreleased	Unreleased	
Samurai Warriors Chronicles 3	Omega Force	Tecmo Koei	December 4, 2014	June 30, 2015	Unreleased	June 24, 2015	
San Goku Shi	Koei Tecmo Games	Koei Tecmo Games	March 19, 2013	Unreleased	Unreleased	Unreleased	
San Goku Shi 2	Koei Tecmo Games	Koei Tecmo Games	December 6, 2015	Unreleased	Unreleased	Unreleased	
Sangoku Stories Ten	Poisoft	Poisoft	January 14, 2015	Unreleased	Unreleased	Unreleased	
Sanrio characters Picross	Jupiter Corporation	Jupiter Corporation	April 25, 2018	July 19, 2018	Unreleased	June 28, 2018	
Schlag den Raab: Das 2. Spiel	Sproing	bitComposer	Unreleased	Unreleased	Unreleased	December 16, 2011	
Scooby-Doo! & Looney Tunes Cartoon Universe Adventure	WayForward Technologies	Warner Bros. Interactive Entertainment	Unreleased	July 8, 2014	Unreleased	Unreleased	
Scoop'n Birds	TwinSky Games	TwinSky Games	Unreleased	April 13, 2017	Unreleased	Unreleased	
Scribblenauts Unlimited	5th Cell	Warner Bros. Interactive Entertainment	Unreleased	November 13, 2012	November 30, 2012	December 6, 2013	
Scribblenauts Unmasked: A DC Comics Adventure	5th Cell	Warner Bros. Interactive Entertainment	Unreleased	September 24, 2013	September 25, 2013	Unreleased	
SD Gundam G Generation	Namco Bandai Games	Namco Bandai Games	December 22, 2011	Unreleased	Unreleased	Unreleased	
Secret Agent Files: Miami	Joindots	Joindots	Unreleased	October 7, 2013	Unreleased	November 14, 2013	
Secret Empires of the Ancient World	Teyon	Selectsoft	Unreleased	September 18, 2014	Unreleased	Unreleased	
Secret Journeys: Cities of the World	Teyon	Selectsoft	Unreleased	September 23, 2014	Unreleased	Unreleased	
Secret Mysteries in London	Media Sales & Licensing	Media Sales & Licensing	Unreleased	Unreleased	March 29, 2012	February 10, 2012	
Secret Mysteries in New York	Engine Software	Tulip Games	Unreleased	November 14, 2013	Unreleased	Unreleased	
Secrets of the Titanic	Avanquest Software	Avanquest Software	Unreleased	Unreleased	Unreleased	June 29, 2012	
Sega 3D Classics Collection	M2	Sega	December 23, 2014	April 26, 2016	Unreleased	November 4, 2016	
Sega 3D Fukkoku Archives	M2	Sega	December 18, 2014	Unreleased	Unreleased	Unreleased	
Sega 3D Fukkoku Archives 3: Final Stage	M2	Sega	December 22, 2016	Unreleased	Unreleased	Unreleased	
Seisou no Amazones	Arc System Works	Arc System Works	November 14, 2013	Unreleased	Unreleased	Unreleased	
Senran Kagura 2: Deep Crimson	Marvelous AQL	Marvelous AQL	August 7, 2014	September 15, 2015	August 27, 2015	August 27, 2015	
Senran Kagura Burst	Marvelous AQL	Marvelous AQL	August 30, 2012	November 14, 2013	February 28, 2014	February 28, 2014	
Senran Kagura: Shōjo-tachi no Shin'ei	Marvelous Entertainment	Marvelous Entertainment	September 22, 2011	Unreleased	Unreleased	Unreleased	
Sentou-chuu: Densetsu no Shinobi to Survival Battle!	Bandai Namco Games	Bandai Namco Games	October 17, 2013	Unreleased	Unreleased	Unreleased	
Severed	DrinkBox Studios	JP: Flyhigh Works; WW: DrinkBox Studios	December 28, 2016	October 13, 2016	Unreleased	September 22, 2016	
Shakedown: Hawaii	Vblank Entertainment	Vblank Entertainment	Unreleased	September 19, 2019	September 26, 2019	September 26, 2019	
Shanghai 3D	Sunsoft	Arc System Works	February 12, 2014	Unreleased	Unreleased	Unreleased	
Shanghai Mahjong	Bigben Interactive	Bigben Interactive	Unreleased	March 12, 2015	Unreleased	March 12, 2015	
Shantae and the Pirate's Curse	WayForward Technologies; Inti Creates	JP: Intergrow; WW: WayForward Technologies	November 19, 2015	October 23, 2014	February 5, 2015	February 5, 2015	
Shephy	Arc System Works	Arc System Works	November 9, 2016	Unreleased	Unreleased	Unreleased	
Sherlock Holmes and The Mystery of the Frozen City	Frogwares	Focus Home Interactive	August 29, 2013	Unreleased	October 25, 2012	October 25, 2012	
Shift DX	Choice Provisions	Choice Provisions	July 27, 2016	January 12, 2017	Unreleased	January 12, 2017	
Shifting World	Fishing Cactus	Aksys Games	April 26, 2012	April 24, 2012	Unreleased	September 28, 2012	
Shin Atelier Rorona: Hajimari no Monogatari The Alchemist of Arland	Gust	Koei Tecmo Games	June 4, 2015	Unreleased	Unreleased	Unreleased	
Shin Hyu~ Stone	Poisoft	Poisoft	April 22, 2015	Unreleased	Unreleased	Unreleased	
Shin Megami Tensei IV	Atlus	Atlus	May 23, 2013	July 16, 2013	Unreleased	October 30, 2014	
Shin Megami Tensei IV: Apocalypse	Atlus	PAL: Deep Silver; WW: Atlus	February 10, 2016	September 20, 2016	December 9, 2016	December 2, 2016	
Shin Megami Tensei: Strange Journey Redux	Atlus	Atlus; Lancarse	October 26, 2017	May 15, 2018	May 18, 2018	May 18, 2018	
Shin Megami Tensei: Devil Summoner: Soul Hackers	Atlus	PAL: NIS America; WW: Atlus	August 30, 2012	April 16, 2013	September 26, 2013	September 20, 2013	
Shin Megami Tensei: Devil Survivor Overclocked	Atlus	EU: Ghostlight; WW: Atlus	September 1, 2011	August 23, 2011	Unreleased	April 5, 2013	
Shin Megami Tensei: Devil Survivor 2: Record Breaker	Atlus	EU: Nis America; WW: Atlus	January 29, 2015	May 5, 2015	November 5, 2015	October 30, 2015	
Shin Sangoku Musou VS	Omega Force	Tecmo Koei	April 26, 2012	Unreleased	Unreleased	Unreleased	
Shingeki no Kyojin: Jinrui Saigo no Tsubasa	Spike Chunsoft	Spike Chunsoft	December 5, 2013	Unreleased	Unreleased	Unreleased	
Shingeki no Kyojin Shichi Kara no Dasshutsu	Ruby Party	Koei Tecmo Games	May 11, 2017	Unreleased	Unreleased	Unreleased	
Shingeki no Kyojin 2 Mirai no Zahyou	Spike Chunsoft	Spike Chunsoft	November 30, 2017	Unreleased	Unreleased	Unreleased	
Shinjuku Dungeon	PUMO	PUMO	January 7, 2015	Unreleased	Unreleased	Unreleased	
Shinobi 3D	Griptonite Games	Sega	November 17, 2011	November 15, 2011	November 10, 2011	November 11, 2011	
Shoot the Ball	RCMADIAX	RCMADIAX	April 19, 2017	November 10, 2016	December 1, 2016	November 10, 2016	
Shounen Ashibe: Go! Go! Goma-chan: Cute na Goma-chi Ippai Puzzle	FuRyu	FuRyu	April 19, 2017	Unreleased	Unreleased	Unreleased	
Shovel Knight	Yacht Club Games	JP: Nintendo; WW: Yacht Club Games	June 30, 2016	June 26, 2014	November 5, 2014	November 5, 2014	
Shovel Software Insurance Claim	Butterfly	Batafurai	Unreleased	Unreleased	Unreleased	August 18, 2022	
Shuriken Sentai Ninninger: Game de Wasshoi!!	Bandai Namco Games	Bandai Namco Games	September 30, 2015	Unreleased	Unreleased	Unreleased	
Siesta Fiesta	Mojo Bones	Mojo Bones	Unreleased	July 24, 2014	Unreleased	July 24, 2014	
Silver Falls: 3 Down Stars	Sungrand Studios	Sungrand Studios	Unreleased	January 2, 2020	Unreleased	January 9, 2020	
Silver Falls: Gaiden Deathly Delusion Destroyers	Sungrand	Sungrand	Unreleased	March 9, 2023	Unreleased	Unreleased	
Silver Falls: Ghoul Busters	Sungrand Studios	Sungrand Studios	Unreleased	July 14, 2022	Unreleased	Unreleased	
Silver Falls: Guardian And Metal Exterminators	Sungrand	Sungrand	Unreleased	September 15, 2022	Unreleased	Unreleased	
Silver Falls: Ruby River	Sungrand	Sungrand	Unreleased	March 9, 2023	Unreleased	Unreleased	
Silver Falls: Undertakers	Sungrand Studios	Sungrand Studios	Unreleased	January 28, 2021	Unreleased	January 14, 2021	
Simple DL Series Vol. 1: The Misshitsu kara no Dassuhatsu – Fushigi na Kummadonaru Burger hen	Intense	D3 Publisher	June 29, 2011	Unreleased	Unreleased	Unreleased	
Simple DL Series Vol. 2: The Misshitsu kara no Dasshutsu – Gakkō no Kyū Kōsha-hen	Intense	D3 Publisher	December 7, 2011	Unreleased	Unreleased	Unreleased	
Simple DL Series Vol. 3: The Mishitsu kara no Dasshutsu – Serebuna Gōtei hen	Intense	D3 Publisher	April 4, 2012	Unreleased	Unreleased	Unreleased	
Simple DL Series Vol. 4: Escape Trick: Nangoku no Rizoto Hen	Intense	D3 Publisher	August 29, 2012	Unreleased	Unreleased	Unreleased	
Simple DL Series Vol. 5: The Noroi Hai Byoin – Tojikemerareta Kao no nai Shojo	Intense	D3 Publisher	September 12, 2012	Unreleased	Unreleased	Unreleased	
Simple DL Series Vol. 6: The Misshitsukara no Dasshutsu - Asobi no Tengoku Kumadonaru Bowl-Hen	Intense	D3 Publisher	November 14, 2012	Unreleased	Unreleased	Unreleased	
Simple DL Series Vol. 7: The Uwaki Kareshi – Totsugeki! Uwaki Genba	Intense	D3 Publisher	January 30, 2013	Unreleased	Unreleased	Unreleased	
Simple DL Series Vol. 8: The Uwaki Kareshi – Uwaki no Daishō	Intense	D3 Publisher	March 6, 2013	Unreleased	Unreleased	Unreleased	
Simple DL Series Vol. 9: The Misshitsu kara no Dasshutsu – Terebi Kyoku Mitchaku 24-ji Hen	Intense	D3 Publisher	April 3, 2013	Unreleased	Unreleased	Unreleased	
Simple DL Series Vol. 10: The Uwaki Kareshi – Christmas Chūshi no Oshirase	Intense	D3 Publisher	April 3, 2013	Unreleased	Unreleased	Unreleased	
Simple DL Series Vol. 11: The Uwaki Kareshi – Kaseifu ga Mita Uwaki Genba	Intense	D3 Publisher	April 24, 2013	Unreleased	Unreleased	Unreleased	
Simple DL Series Vol. 12: The Dasshatsu Game – Kiken na Itsutsu no Misshitsu	Intense	D3 Publisher	April 24, 2013	Unreleased	Unreleased	Unreleased	
Simple DL Series Vol. 13: The Taxi - Boku wa Charisma Utenshu	D3 Publisher	D3 Publisher	June 12, 2013	Unreleased	Unreleased	Unreleased	
Simple DL Series Vol. 14: The Dasshutsu Game - Uragiri no Misshitsu	D3 Publisher	D3 Publisher	July 31, 2013	Unreleased	Unreleased	Unreleased	
Simple DL Series Vol. 15: The Mahjong	D3 Publisher	D3 Publisher	August 7, 2013	Unreleased	Unreleased	Unreleased	
Simple DL Series Vol. 16: The Misshitsukara no Dasshutsu - Yukai na Saru to Family Restaurant Hen	D3 Publisher	D3 Publisher	September 4, 2013	Unreleased	Unreleased	Unreleased	
Simple DL Series Vol. 17: The Othello	D3 Publisher	D3 Publisher	October 2, 2013	Unreleased	Unreleased	Unreleased	
Simple DL Series Vol. 18: The Shogi	D3 Publisher	D3 Publisher	October 30, 2013	Unreleased	Unreleased	Unreleased	
Simple DL Series Vol. 19: The Igo	D3 Publisher	D3 Publisher	October 30, 2013	Unreleased	Unreleased	Unreleased	
Simple DL Series Vol. 20: The Card: Daifugou - Poker - Blackjack	D3 Publisher	D3 Publisher	October 30, 2013	Unreleased	Unreleased	Unreleased	
Simple DL Series Vol. 21: The Kanshikikan - File.1 Kinkyuu Sousa! Juuryou Shouko o Touch Seyo!	D3 Publisher	D3 Publisher	October 30, 2013	Unreleased	Unreleased	Unreleased	
Simple DL Series Vol. 22: The Hohei - Senjou no Inutachi	D3 Publisher	D3 Publisher	November 6, 2013	Unreleased	Unreleased	Unreleased	
Simple DL Series Vol. 23: The Kanshikikan - File.2 Kinkyuu Shutsudou! Ochita Hoshi o Oe!	D3 Publisher	D3 Publisher	November 27, 2013	Unreleased	Unreleased	Unreleased	
Simple DL Series Vol. 24: The Misshitsukara no Dasshutsu - Iyasarenai Onsen-Hen	D3 Publisher	D3 Publisher	February 26, 2014	Unreleased	Unreleased	Unreleased	
Simple DL Series Vol. 25: The Solitaire - Klondike Spider	D3 Publisher	D3 Publisher	April 2, 2014	Unreleased	Unreleased	Unreleased	
Simple DL Series Vol. 26: The Tennis	D3 Publisher	D3 Publisher	April 16, 2014	Unreleased	Unreleased	Unreleased	
Simple DL Series Vol. 27: The Illust Puzzle	D3 Publisher	D3 Publisher	April 30, 2014	Unreleased	Unreleased	Unreleased	
Simple DL Series Vol. 28: The Rengeki Heroes	D3 Publisher	D3 Publisher	April 30, 2014	Unreleased	Unreleased	Unreleased	
Simple DL Series Vol. 29: The Line Puzzle	D3 Publisher	D3 Publisher	May 28, 2014	Unreleased	Unreleased	Unreleased	
Simple DL Series Vol. 30: The Number Puzzle	D3 Publisher	D3 Publisher	June 25, 2014	Unreleased	Unreleased	Unreleased	
Simple DL Series Vol. 31: The Misshitsukara no Dasshutsu - Enchou Hisshi no Karaoke-Hen	D3 Publisher	D3 Publisher	July 30, 2014	Unreleased	Unreleased	Unreleased	
Simple DL Series Vol. 32: The Battle Robo - Daikyoutou Scramble	D3 Publisher	D3 Publisher	August 6, 2014	Unreleased	Unreleased	Unreleased	
Simple DL Series Vol. 33: The Nekketsu! Honoo no Ramen-ya	D3 Publisher	D3 Publisher	October 29, 2014	Unreleased	Unreleased	Unreleased	
Simple DL Series Vol. 34: The Misshitsukara no Dasshutsu - Fushigi Hakken! Hakubutsukan-Hen	D3 Publisher	D3 Publisher	November 19, 2014	Unreleased	Unreleased	Unreleased	
Simple DL Series Vol. 35: The Noroi no Haikousha - Noroi no Kamen to Futago no Shoujo	D3 Publisher	D3 Publisher	December 17, 2014	Unreleased	Unreleased	Unreleased	
Simple DL Series Vol. 36: The Misshitsukara no Dasshutsu: Tabi wa Michidzure! Tetsudou-Hen	D3 Publisher	D3 Publisher	April 1, 2015	Unreleased	Unreleased	Unreleased	
Simple DL Series Vol. 37: The Kyojinsou	D3 Publisher	D3 Publisher	April 8, 2015	Unreleased	Unreleased	Unreleased	
Simple DL Series Vol. 38: The Item Sagashi - Joshikousei Tantei Shinjitsu no Jikenbo	D3 Publisher	D3 Publisher	April 22, 2015	Unreleased	Unreleased	Unreleased	
Simple DL Series Vol. 39: The Misshitsukara no Dasshutsu - Nou o Kitaeru Sports Gym Hen	D3 Publisher	D3 Publisher	July 29, 2015	Unreleased	Unreleased	Unreleased	
Simple DL Series Vol. 40: The Misshitsukara no Dasshutsu - Daifushizen Camp-Jou Hen	D3 Publisher	D3 Publisher	April 6, 2016	Unreleased	Unreleased	Unreleased	
The Sims 3	Maxis; Edge of Reality	Electronic Arts	April 1, 2011	March 27, 2011	March 31, 2011	March 25, 2011	
The Sims 3: Pets	Electronic Arts; Edge of Reality	Electronic Arts	October 20, 2011	October 18, 2011	October 20, 2011	October 21, 2011	
Sketchy Snowboarding	Side Hit Studios	Side Hit Studios	Unreleased	July 11, 2019	Unreleased	Unreleased	
Skylanders: Giants	n-Space	Activision	Unreleased	October 21, 2012	October 17, 2012	October 19, 2012	
Skylanders: Spyro's Adventure	Vicarious Visions	JP: Square Enix; WW: Activision	July 12, 2013	October 16, 2011	October 13, 2011	October 14, 2011	
Skylanders: SuperChargers Racing	Beenox	Activision	Unreleased	September 20, 2015	September 23, 2015	September 25, 2015	
Skylanders: Swap Force	n-Space	Activision	Unreleased	October 13, 2013	October 16, 2013	October 18, 2013	
Skylanders: Trap Team	Beenox	Activision	Unreleased	October 5, 2014	October 2, 2014	October 10, 2014	
SkyPeace	Sonic Powered	Sonic Powered	April 9, 2014	June 26, 2014	Unreleased	December 22, 2016	
Slice It!	Aksys Games	Aksys Games	April 23, 2014	January 14, 2016	Unreleased	February 4, 2016	
Slime MoriMori Dragon Quest 3: Daikaizoku to Shippo Dan	Square Enix	Square Enix	November 2, 2011	Unreleased	Unreleased	Unreleased	
Slime Slayer	Famous Gamous	Famous Gamous	Unreleased	October 10, 2019	Unreleased	Unreleased	
Slitherlink by Nikoli	Nikoli	Hamster Corporation	August 24, 2011	June 21, 2012	Unreleased	Unreleased	
Small World Z	In-D Gaming	In-D Gaming	Unreleased	January 9, 2020	Unreleased	Unreleased	
Smash Bowling 3D	Big John Games	Big John Games	Unreleased	August 8, 2013	Unreleased	July 26, 2018	
Smash Cat Heroes	Tom Create	Tom Create	June 6, 2012	April 17, 2014	Unreleased	May 26, 2016	
Smile Precure! Let's Go! Marchen World	Bandai Namco Games	Bandai Namco Games	August 2, 2012	Unreleased	Unreleased	Unreleased	
The Smurfs	Magic Pockets	Ubisoft	Unreleased	October 13, 2015	July 15, 2015	July 2, 2015	
Snack World: Trejarers	Level-5	Level-5	August 10, 2017	Unreleased	Unreleased	Unreleased	
Snake3d	Igor Gafton	Igor Gafton	Unreleased	October 1, 2020	Unreleased	October 15, 2020	
Snow Moto Racing 3D	Zordix	Zordix	Unreleased	October 17, 2013	Unreleased	October 24, 2013	
Soccer Up 3D	EnjoyUp Games	JP: Starsign; WW: EnjoyUp Games	June 11, 2014	April 11, 2013	Unreleased	July 11, 2013	
Soccer Up Online	EnjoyUp Games	EnjoyUp Games	Unreleased	January 15, 2015	Unreleased	November 6, 2014	
SoniPro	Imageepoch	Nitroplus	May 29, 2014	Unreleased	Unreleased	Unreleased	
Sonic & All-Stars Racing Transformed	Sumo Digital	Sega	Unreleased	February 12, 2013	February 7, 2013	February 7, 2013	
Sonic Boom: Fire & Ice	Sanzaru Games	Sega	October 27, 2016	September 27, 2016	October 1, 2016	September 30, 2016	
Sonic Boom: Shattered Crystal	Sanzaru Games	Sega	December 18, 2014	November 18, 2014	November 29, 2014	November 21, 2014	
Sonic Generations	Sonic Team; Dimps	Sega	December 1, 2011	November 22, 2011	November 24, 2011	November 25, 2011	
Sonic Lost World	Sonic Team; Dimps	PAL: Nintendo; WW: Sega	October 24, 2013	October 29, 2013	October 19, 2013	October 18, 2013	
Sousaku Alice to Oujisama!	Hyde	Happinet	November 26, 2015	Unreleased	Unreleased	Unreleased	
Space Defender Battle Infinity	Denvzla Estudio	Denvzla Estudio	Unreleased	September 6, 2018	Unreleased	May 2, 2019	
Space Intervention	VG && IG	Igor Gafton	Unreleased	September 12, 2019	Unreleased	September 5, 2019	
Space Lift Danger Panic!	Springloaded	Springloaded	Unreleased	January 15, 2015	Unreleased	January 15, 2015	
SPEC: Kan	Bandai Namco Games	Bandai Namco Games	October 3, 2013	Unreleased	Unreleased	Unreleased	
SpeedX 3D	Gamelion Studios	JP: Teyon; WW: Gamelion Studios	January 23, 2013	August 30, 2012	August 9, 2012	August 9, 2012	
SpeedX 3D: Hyper Edition	Gamelion Studios	Gamelion Studios	December 25, 2013	May 9, 2013	Unreleased	May 30, 2013	
Spider-Man: Edge of Time	Beenox	Activision	Unreleased	October 4, 2011	October 26, 2011	October 14, 2011	
Spirit Camera: The Cursed Memoir	Tecmo Koei	Nintendo	January 12, 2012	April 13, 2012	Unreleased	June 29, 2012	
Splat the Difference	Lightwood Games	Lightwood Games	November 29, 2016	September 15, 2016	September 15, 2016	September 15, 2016	
SpongeBob HeroPants	Behaviour Santiago	Activision	Unreleased	February 3, 2015	Unreleased	March 26, 2015	
SpongeBob SquarePants: Plankton's Robotic Revenge	Behaviour Interactive	Activision	Unreleased	October 22, 2013	October 23, 2013	October 11, 2013	
SpongeBob SquigglePants 3D	WayForward Technologies	THQ	Unreleased	May 17, 2011	May 26, 2011	May 27, 2011	
Spot the Differences!	Sanuk Games	Bigben Interactive	Unreleased	February 13, 2014	Unreleased	Unreleased	
Spy Hunter	TT Fusion	Warner Bros. Interactive Entertainment	Unreleased	October 9, 2012	November 7, 2012	November 8, 2012	
Squarcat	VG && IG	Igor Gafton	Unreleased	August 15, 2019	Unreleased	September 5, 2019	
Squareboy vs Bullies: Arena Edition	Rohan Narang	Ratalaika Games	Unreleased	December 7, 2017	Unreleased	December 7, 2017	
Squids Odyssey	The Game Bakers	The Game Bakers	Unreleased	July 3, 2014	Unreleased	July 3, 2014	
Sssnakes	EnjoyUp Games	EnjoyUp Games	November 16, 2016	June 2, 2016	Unreleased	April 28, 2016	
Stack 'em High	Sims	Starsign	Unreleased	July 6, 2017	Unreleased	Unreleased	
Star Fox 64 3D	Nintendo EAD; Q-Games	Nintendo	July 14, 2011	September 9, 2011	September 15, 2011	September 9, 2011	
Star Wars Pinball	Zen Studios	Zen Studios	Unreleased	September 19, 2013	Unreleased	September 19, 2013	
Starry * Sky: In Autumn 3D	Honey Bee	Honey Bee	August 29, 2013	Unreleased	Unreleased	Unreleased	
Starry * Sky: In Spring 3D	Honey Bee	Honey Bee	April 25, 2013	Unreleased	Unreleased	Unreleased	
Starry * Sky: In Summer 3D	Honey Bee	Honey Bee	June 27, 2013	Unreleased	Unreleased	Unreleased	
Starry * Sky: In Winter 3D	Honey Bee	Honey Bee	October 31, 2013	Unreleased	Unreleased	Unreleased	
The Starship Damrey	Level-5	Level-5	March 27, 2013	May 16, 2013	May 16, 2013	May 16, 2013	
SteamWorld Dig	Image & Form	Image & Form	November 20, 2013	August 8, 2013	August 7, 2013	August 7, 2013	
SteamWorld Dig 2	Image & Form	Image & Form	Unreleased	February 22, 2018	Unreleased	February 22, 2018	
SteamWorld Heist	Image & Form	Image & Form	Unreleased	December 10, 2015	December 10, 2015	December 10, 2015	
Steel Diver	Nintendo EAD; Vitei	Nintendo	May 12, 2011	March 27, 2011	May 12, 2011	May 6, 2011	
Steel Diver: Sub Wars	Nintendo EAD; Vitei	Nintendo	February 13, 2014	February 13, 2014	February 13, 2014	February 13, 2014	
Steel Empire	Mebius	JP: Starfish SD; WW: Teyon	March 19, 2014	July 31, 2014	December 17, 2015	December 17, 2015	
Stella Glow	Image Epoch	Sega	June 4, 2015	November 17, 2015	March 11, 2016	March 11, 2016	
Sternenschweif 3D: Das Geheimnis im Zauberwald	Quadriga Games	United Soft Media	Unreleased	Unreleased	Unreleased	March 7, 2014	
Stickman Super Athletics	CoderChild	CoderChild	July 27, 2016	August 4, 2016	Unreleased	August 4, 2016	
Storm Chaser: Tornado Alley	Skunk Software	Skunk Software	Unreleased	June 7, 2018	Unreleased	Unreleased	
Story of Seasons	Marvelous AQL	JP: Marvelous AQL; NA: Xseed Games; EU: Nintendo	February 27, 2014	March 31, 2015	January 9, 2016	December 31, 2015	
Story of Seasons: Trio of Towns	Marvelous	JP: Marvelous; NA: Xseed Games; EU: Nintendo	June 23, 2016	February 28, 2017	October 13, 2017	October 13, 2017	
StreetPass Mii Plaza	Nintendo	Nintendo	February 26, 2011	March 27, 2011	March 31, 2011	March 25, 2011	
Stretchmo •Fullblox^{PAL}	Intelligent Systems	Nintendo	May 13, 2015	May 14, 2015	May 14, 2015	May 14, 2015	
Strike Force Foxx	Big John Games	Big John Games	Unreleased	July 17, 2014	Unreleased	Unreleased	
Style Savvy: Fashion Forward	Syn Sophia; Nintendo SPD	Nintendo	April 16, 2015	August 19, 2016	November 21, 2015	November 20, 2015	
Style Savvy: Styling Star	Syn Sophia	Nintendo	November 2, 2017	December 25, 2017	November 25, 2017	November 24, 2017	
Style Savvy: Trendsetters	Syn Sophia	Nintendo	September 27, 2012	October 22, 2012	November 17, 2012	November 16, 2012	
SubaraCity	Flyhigh Works	EU: Circle Entertainment; WW: Flyhigh Works	February 15, 2017	March 30, 2017	Unreleased	March 23, 2017	
Sudoku + 7 Other Complex Puzzles by Nikoli •Nikoli no Sudoku 3D: 8-tsu no Puzzle de 1000-mon^{JP}	Hudson	Hudson	March 31, 2011	Unreleased	Unreleased	December 7, 2012	
Sudoku by Nikoli	Nikoli	Hamster Corporation	June 7, 2011	May 10, 2012	Unreleased	August 15, 2013	
Sudoku Party	Lightwood Games	Lightwood Games	Unreleased	March 13, 2017	Unreleased	March 23, 2017	
Sumikko Gurashi: Koko ga Ochitsukundesu	Nippon Columbia	Nippon Columbia	November 20, 2014	Unreleased	Unreleased	Unreleased	
Sumikko Gurashi: Koko, Dokonan Desu?	Nippon Columbia	Nippon Columbia	July 20, 2017	Unreleased	Unreleased	Unreleased	
Sumikko Gurashi: Mura wo Tsukurun Desu	Nippon Columbia	Nippon Columbia	July 21, 2016	Unreleased	Unreleased	Unreleased	
Sumikko Gurashi: Omise Hajimerun Desu	Nippon Columbia	Nippon Columbia	November 19, 2015	Unreleased	Unreleased	Unreleased	
Sumico	Engine Software	JP: Rainy Frog; WW: Engine Software	April 20, 2016	January 29, 2015	Unreleased	December 18, 2014	
Super Black Bass 3D	Starfish SD	Rising Star Games	October 6, 2011	April 2, 2013	Unreleased	February 15, 2013	
Super Destronaut 3D	Petite Games	Petite Games	Unreleased	March 23, 2017	Unreleased	March 30, 2017	
Super Little Acorns 3D Turbo	Pixel Toys	Pixel Toys	June 26, 2013	April 18, 2013	Unreleased	April 18, 2013	
Super Mario 3D Land	Nintendo EAD Tokyo	Nintendo	November 3, 2011	November 13, 2011	November 24, 2011	November 18, 2011	
Super Mario Maker for Nintendo 3DS	Nintendo EPD	Nintendo	December 1, 2016	December 2, 2016	December 3, 2016	December 2, 2016	
Super Monkey Ball 3D	Sega	Sega	March 3, 2011	March 27, 2011	March 31, 2011	March 25, 2011	
Super Robot Wars BX	Banpresto	Bandai Namco Games	August 20, 2015	Unreleased	Unreleased	Unreleased	
Super Robot Wars UX	Banpresto	Bandai Namco Games	March 14, 2013	Unreleased	Unreleased	Unreleased	
Super Smash Bros. for Nintendo 3DS	Sora Ltd.; Bandai Namco Games	Nintendo	September 13, 2014	October 3, 2014	October 4, 2014	October 3, 2014	
Super Street Fighter IV: 3D Edition	Capcom; Dimps	Capcom	February 26, 2011	March 27, 2011	March 31, 2011	March 25, 2011	
Super Strike Beach Volleyball	Arc System Works	Natsume Inc.	August 8, 2012	April 14, 2016	Unreleased	April 14, 2016	
Survivor: Heroes	Bigben Interactive	Bigben Interactive	Unreleased	Unreleased	Unreleased	October 16, 2014	
Sushi Striker: The Way of Sushido	indieszero	Nintendo	June 8, 2018	June 8, 2018	June 8, 2018	June 8, 2018	
Sweets Chara: Sweets Gakkou e Youkoso!	FuRyu	FuRyu	November 9, 2017	Unreleased	Unreleased	Unreleased	
Sweet Memories Blackjack	Circle Entertainment	Circle Entertainment	August 8, 2012	July 12, 2012	Unreleased	May 31, 2012	
Swipe	RCMADIAX	RCMADIAX	Unreleased	July 27, 2017	July 27, 2017	July 27, 2017	
Swords & Darkness	Arc System Works	Arc System Works	December 18, 2013	June 11, 2015	Unreleased	Unreleased	
Swords & Soldiers 3D	CIRCLE Entertainment	CIRCLE Entertainment	June 5, 2013	May 16, 2013	Unreleased	May 12, 2013	
Symphony of Eternity	Kemco	Kemco	September 6, 2017	October 5, 2017	Unreleased	October 5, 2017	
Syunsoku Mezase! Zenkoku Saikyou Runner	MTO	MTO	November 13, 2014	Unreleased	Unreleased	Unreleased	
Table Tennis Infinity	RCMADIAX	RCMADIAX	Unreleased	July 6, 2017	July 6, 2017	July 6, 2017	
Taiko Drum Master: Doku Don! Mystery Adventure	Bandai Namco Entertainment	Bandai Namco Entertainment	June 16, 2016	Unreleased	Unreleased	Unreleased	
Taiko no Tatsujin: Chibi Dragon to Fushigi na Orb	Bandai Namco Games	Bandai Namco Games	July 12, 2012	Unreleased	Unreleased	Unreleased	
Taiko no Tatsujin: Don to Katsu no Jikuu Daibouken	Bandai Namco Games	Bandai Namco Games	June 26, 2014	Unreleased	Unreleased	Unreleased	
Taisen Puzzle & Dragons X	GungHo	GungHo	September 28, 2016	Unreleased	Unreleased	Unreleased	
Takagari-O	Arc System Works	Arc System Works	October 3, 2012	Unreleased	Unreleased	Unreleased	
Takeyariman	Poisoft	Poisoft	November 2, 2011	Unreleased	Unreleased	Unreleased	
Tales of the Abyss	Namco Tales Studio	Bandai Namco Games	June 30, 2011	February 14, 2012	November 24, 2011	November 25, 2011	
Tales of the World: Reve Unitia	Bandai Namco Games	Bandai Namco Games	October 23, 2014	Unreleased	Unreleased	Unreleased	
Tamago Dai Bōken	Tom Create	Tom Create	April 24, 2013	Unreleased	Unreleased	Unreleased	
Tamagotchi no Dokidoki * Dream Omisetchi	Bandai Namco Games	Bandai Namco Games	May 23, 2013	Unreleased	Unreleased	Unreleased	
Tamagotchi no Puchi Puchi Omisechi: Ninki no Omise Atsume Maseta	Bandai Namco Games	Bandai Namco Games	November 16, 2017	Unreleased	Unreleased	Unreleased	
Tamagotchi! Seishun no Dream School	Bandai Namco Games	Bandai Namco Games	November 7, 2013	Unreleased	Unreleased	Unreleased	
Tangram Attack	Square One Games	Square One Games	Unreleased	July 31, 2014	Unreleased	Unreleased	
Tangram Style •Tangram x Tangram: Daremo ga Hamaru Silhouette Puzzle^{JP}	Moving Player	Arc System Works	October 1, 2014	August 8, 2013	Unreleased	August 8, 2013	
Tantei Jinguuji Saburo: Fukushuu No Rinbu	WorkJam	Arc System Works	June 28, 2012	Unreleased	Unreleased	Unreleased	
Tank Onslaught	RandomSpin	Vadim Gafton	Unreleased	February 6, 2020	Unreleased	February 20, 2020	
Tank Troopers	Nintendo EPD; Vitei	Nintendo	December 21, 2016	February 16, 2017	February 16, 2017	February 16, 2017	
Tappingo	Goodbye Galaxy Games	Circle Entertainment	January 28, 2015	February 27, 2014	Unreleased	March 6, 2014	
Tappingo 2	Goodbye Galaxy Games	Goodbye Galaxy Games	Unreleased	September 4, 2014	Unreleased	June 25, 2015	
Team Kirby Clash Deluxe	HAL Laboratory	Nintendo	April 13, 2017	April 12, 2017	Unreleased	April 13, 2017	
Teddy Together	Arika	Nintendo	June 20, 2013	Unreleased	July 2, 2016	July 1, 2016	
Teenage Mutant Ninja Turtles	Magic Pockets	Activision	Unreleased	October 22, 2013	October 23, 2013	October 25, 2013	
Teenage Mutant Ninja Turtles	Magic Pockets	Activision	Unreleased	August 5, 2014	August 29, 2014	Unreleased	
Teenage Mutant Ninja Turtles: Danger of the Ooze	WayForward Technologies	Activision	Unreleased	November 11, 2014	October 31, 2014	October 31, 2014	
Tekken 3D: Prime Edition	Arika; Bandai Namco Games	Bandai Namco Games	February 16, 2012	February 14, 2012	February 23, 2012	February 17, 2012	
Tenkai Knights: Brave Battle	Bandai Namco Games	Bandai Namco Games	September 25, 2014	October 7, 2014	September 25, 2014	September 26, 2014	
Terra Formars: Akaki Hoshi no Gekitou	FuRyu	FuRyu	April 2, 2015	Unreleased	Unreleased	Unreleased	
Terraria	Codeglue	505 Games	April 21, 2016	March 15, 2016	February 11, 2015	December 12, 2015	
Tetris: Axis	Hudson Soft	JP: Bandai Namco Games; NA: Nintendo; PAL: Tetris Online	October 20, 2011	October 2, 2011	October 27, 2011	October 21, 2011	
Tetris Ultimate	Ubisoft	Ubisoft	Unreleased	November 11, 2014	November 13, 2014	November 14, 2014	
Tetsudou Nippon! Rosen Tabi: Aizu Tetsudou Hen	Sonic Powered	Sonic Powered	June 28, 2012	Unreleased	Unreleased	Unreleased	
Tetsudou Nippon! Rosen Tabi: Joumou Denki Tetsudou Hen	Sonic Powered	Sonic Powered	November 5, 2015	Unreleased	Unreleased	Unreleased	
Tetsudou Nippon! Rosen Tabi: Kikansha Thomas-hen Oigawa Tetsudou	Sonic Powered	Sonic Powered	July 28, 2016	Unreleased	Unreleased	Unreleased	
Tetsudou Nippon! Rosen no Tabi: Nagaragawa Tetsudou Hen	Sonic Powered	Sonic Powered	September 26, 2013	Unreleased	Unreleased	Unreleased	
Theatrhythm Dragon Quest	indieszero	Square Enix	March 26, 2015	Unreleased	Unreleased	Unreleased	
Theatrhythm Final Fantasy	Square Enix 1st Production Department; indieszero	Square Enix	February 16, 2012	July 3, 2012	July 5, 2012	July 6, 2012	
Theatrhythm Final Fantasy: Curtain Call	Square Enix 1st Production Department; indieszero	Square Enix	April 24, 2014	September 16, 2014	September 18, 2014	September 19, 2014	
The Thieves and the 1000 Pokémon	Marvelous AQL	The Pokémon Company	June 5, 2014	Unreleased	Unreleased	Unreleased	
Thomas and Friends Steaming Around Sodor	Torus Games	Avanquest Software	Unreleased	Unreleased	Unreleased	October 2, 2015	
Thomas to Asonde Oboeru Kotoba to Kazu to ABC	Nippon Columbia	Nippon Columbia	July 31, 2014	Unreleased	Unreleased	Unreleased	
Thor: God of Thunder	Red Fly Studios	Sega	Unreleased	September 13, 2011	September 8, 2011	September 9, 2011	
Thorium Wars: Attack of the Skyfighter	Big John Games	Big John Games	March 11, 2015	August 28, 2014	Unreleased	July 5, 2018	
Timberman	Insane Code	Insane Code	Unreleased	May 30, 2019	Unreleased	May 30, 2019	
Time Travelers	Level-5	Level-5	July 12, 2012	Unreleased	Unreleased	Unreleased	
Tinboy	Interactive Stone	Interactive Stone	Unreleased	Unreleased	Unreleased	February 20, 2020	
Tiny Games: Knights & Dragons	Engine Software	JP: Teyon; NA: Reactor; EU: Joindots	September 10, 2014	May 1, 2014	Unreleased	April 17, 2014	
Titan Attacks!	Puppygames	Curve Studios	Unreleased	February 26, 2015	Unreleased	February 26, 2015	
Toite Susunde! Nazo Toki Castle	Arc System Works	Arc System Works	January 29, 2014	Unreleased	Unreleased	Unreleased	
Toki Tori 3D	Two Tribes; Engine Software	Two Tribes Publishing	November 5, 2015	November 5, 2015	November 5, 2015	November 5, 2015	
Tokotoko Neko Puzzle: Schrodinger no Hakoniwa	Unico	Unico	November 28, 2018	Unreleased	Unreleased	Unreleased	
Tokyo Crash Mobs	Mitchell Corporation	Nintendo	August 8, 2012	January 17, 2013	January 17, 2013	January 17, 2013	
Tom Clancy's Ghost Recon: Shadow Wars	Ubisoft Sofia	Ubisoft	May 19, 2011	March 27, 2011	March 31, 2011	March 25, 2011	
Tom Clancy's Splinter Cell 3D	Ubisoft Montreal	Ubisoft	March 17, 2011	April 10, 2011	March 31, 2011	March 25, 2011	
Tomodachi Life	Nintendo SPD	Nintendo	April 18, 2013	June 6, 2014	June 7, 2014	June 6, 2014	
Tongari Boushi to Mahou no Machi	Konami	Konami	December 20, 2012	Unreleased	Unreleased	Unreleased	
Top Model 3D	TREVA Entertainment	TREVA Entertainment	Unreleased	September 11, 2014	Unreleased	Unreleased	
Top Trumps: NBA All Stars	Ideas Pad	GMG Play	Unreleased	October 8, 2012	Unreleased	Unreleased	
Toriko Ultimate Survival	Bandai Namco	Bandai Namco	November 28, 2013	Unreleased	Unreleased	Unreleased	
Toriko: Gourmet Battle	Bandai Namco Games	Bandai Namco Games	July 4, 2013	Unreleased	Unreleased	Unreleased	
Toriko: Gourmet Monsters!	Bandai Namco Games	Bandai Namco Games	December 13, 2012	Unreleased	Unreleased	Unreleased	
Touch Battle Ninja	Silver Star	Agetec	October 1, 2014	August 18, 2016	Unreleased	Unreleased	
Touch Battle Sensha 3D-3	Silver Star Japan	Silver Star Japan	April 28, 2015	Unreleased	Unreleased	Unreleased	
Touch Battle Tank 3D	Silver Star	Silver Star; Agetec	October 26, 2011	August 9, 2012	Unreleased	January 3, 2013	
Touch Battle Tank 3D 2	Silver Star Japan	Agetec	June 5, 2013	January 30, 2014	Unreleased	May 22, 2014	
Touch Battle Tank: Tag Combat	Silver Star	Circle Entertainment	June 8, 2016	November 17, 2016	Unreleased	December 22, 2016	
Toushin Toshi: Girls Gift RPG	Imageepoch	Imageepoch	January 30, 2014	Unreleased	Unreleased	Unreleased	
Toy Defense	Circle Entertainment	Circle Entertainment	Unreleased	February 25, 2016	Unreleased	February 25, 2016	
Toy Stunt Bike	Wobbly Tooth	JP: Cosen; WW: Wobbly Tooth	December 24, 2014	June 26, 2014	Unreleased	June 26, 2014	
Toys vs Monsters	EnjoyUp Games	EnjoyUp Games	June 5, 2013	December 18, 2014	Unreleased	May 3, 2014	
Transformers: Dark of the Moon Stealth Force Edition	Behaviour Interactive	Activision	Unreleased	June 14, 2011	July 7, 2011	June 24, 2011	
Transformers: Prime – The Game	Now Production	Activision	Unreleased	October 30, 2012	October 31, 2012	November 2, 2012	
Transformers: Rise of the Dark Spark	WayForward Technologies	Activision	Unreleased	June 24, 2014	June 25, 2014	June 27, 2014	
The Trash Pack	Webfoot Technologies	Activision	Unreleased	October 30, 2012	October 31, 2012	Unreleased	
Travel Adventures with Hello Kitty	Compile Heart	Bergsala Lightweight	June 21, 2012	October 1, 2013	September 10, 2013	May 17, 2013	
Tribe Cool Crew: The G@me	Bandai Namco Games	Bandai Namco Games	May 28, 2015	Unreleased	Unreleased	Unreleased	
Triple Breakout	nuGAME	nuGAME	Unreleased	October 11, 2018	Unreleased	October 11, 2018	
True Remembrance: Kioku no Kakera	Shiba Satomi	Arc System Works	February 22, 2012	Unreleased	Unreleased	Unreleased	
Turbo: Super Stunt Squad	Torus Games	NA: D3 Publisher; WW: Bandai Namco Games	Unreleased	July 16, 2013	September 12, 2013	October 11, 2013	
Turkey, Please!	Nostatic Software	Nostatic Software	Unreleased	November 14, 2019	Unreleased	November 21, 2019	
Turtle Tale	Saturnine Games	JP: Teyon; WW: Saturnine Games	December 24, 2014	June 26, 2014	February 5, 2016	June 26, 2014	
Ultimate NES Remix	Indies Zero	Nintendo	August 27, 2015	December 5, 2014	November 8, 2014	November 7, 2014	
Ultimate Poker & BlackJack	Intense	Intense	November 19, 2014	Unreleased	Unreleased	Unreleased	
Unchained Blades	FuRyu	JP: FuRyu; NA: Xseed Games	July 14, 2011	January 3, 2013	Unreleased	Unreleased	
Unchained Blades Exiv	FuRyu	FuRyu	November 29, 2012	Unreleased	Unreleased	Unreleased	
Undead Bowling	G-STYLE	G-STYLE	July 10, 2013	July 18, 2013	Unreleased	October 30, 2014	
Undead Storm Nightmare	G-STYLE	G-STYLE	December 24, 2014	January 22, 2015	Unreleased	February 12, 2015	
Unholy Heights	Bergsala Lightweight	Bergsala Lightweight	August 6, 2014	June 23, 2016	Unreleased	June 23, 2016	
Unlucky Mage	Exe Create	Kemco	October 19, 2016	November 3, 2016	Unreleased	November 3, 2016	
Uo Catch!	Flyhigh Works	Flyhigh Works	June 19, 2014	Unreleased	Unreleased	Unreleased	
Up Up Bot	RCMADIAX	RCMADIAX	Unreleased	May 10, 2018	Unreleased	June 14, 2018	
Urban Trial Freestyle	Tate Multimedia	JP: Flyhigh Works; WW: Tate Multimedia	November 27, 2013	June 27, 2013	Unreleased	June 27, 2013	
Urban Trial Freestyle 2	Tate Multimedia	JP: Flyhigh Works; WW: Tate Multimedia	May 17, 2017	April 20, 2017	Unreleased	March 30, 2017	
Vacation Adventures: Park Ranger	Microvalue	Microvalue	Unreleased	March 6, 2014	Unreleased	March 6, 2014	
Vacation Adventures: Park Ranger 2	Microvalue	Microvalue	Unreleased	Unreleased	Unreleased	November 13, 2014	
Van Helsing sniper Zx100	EnjoyUp Games	EnjoyUp Games	June 10, 2015	June 12, 2014	Unreleased	June 26, 2014	
VectorRacing	Arc System Works	Arc System Works	August 10, 2011	August 23, 2012	Unreleased	Unreleased	
Vera Swings	Brett Yeager	Brett Yeager	Unreleased	February 7, 2019	Unreleased	Unreleased	
Viking Invasion 2: Tower Defense	Bip Media	Bigben Interactive	Unreleased	February 21, 2013	Unreleased	March 14, 2013	
Virus Shooter XX	Dorart	Dorart	March 31, 2011	Unreleased	Unreleased	Unreleased	
Vitamin X Evolution Plus	HuneX	D3 Publisher	January 16, 2014	Unreleased	Unreleased	Unreleased	
Vitamin Z Revolution	HuneX	D3 Publisher	December 12, 2012	Unreleased	Unreleased	Unreleased	
VVVVVV	Nicalis	Nicalis	October 12, 2016	December 29, 2011	October 4, 2012	May 10, 2012	
Wagamama Fashion: Girls Mode Yokubari Sengen! Tokimeki Up!	syn Sophia	Nintendo	April 17, 2014	Unreleased	Unreleased	Unreleased	
Waku Waku Sweets: Happy Sweets Making	Sonic Powered	Sonic Powered	December 12, 2013	March 29, 2018	Unreleased	March 29, 2018	
Wakedas	Circle Entertainment	Circle Entertainment	Unreleased	August 22, 2013	Unreleased	November 14, 2013	
Wan Nyan Doubutsu Byouin 2	Nippon Columbia	Nippon Columbia	August 2, 2012	Unreleased	Unreleased	Unreleased	
Wan Nyan Doubutsu Byouin Pet no Oisha-san ni Narou!	Nippon Columbia	Nippon Columbia	March 15, 2018	Unreleased	Unreleased	Unreleased	
Wan Nyan Pet Shop	Nippon Columbia	Nippon Columbia	November 28, 2013	Unreleased	Unreleased	Unreleased	
Wan Nyan Dobutsu Byouin: Suteki na Juui-San ni Narou!	Nippon Columbia	Nippon Columbia	July 30, 2015	Unreleased	Unreleased	Unreleased	
War & Romance Visual Novel	Stranger Games	Stranger Games	Unreleased	Unreleased	Unreleased	April 23, 2020	
WarioWare Gold	Nintendo SPD; Intelligent Systems	Nintendo	August 2, 2018	August 3, 2018	July 28, 2018	July 27, 2018	
Weapon Shop de Omasse	Level-5	Level-5	November 21, 2012	February 20, 2014	February 20, 2014	February 20, 2014	
Welcome to Suyara Chara Suites School!	FuRyu	FuRyu	November 30, 2017	Unreleased	Unreleased	Unreleased	
Wild Adventures: Ultimate Deer Hunt 3D	eV Interactive	eV Interactive	Unreleased	January 10, 2013	Unreleased	Unreleased	
Wind-up Knight 2	Robot Invader	Unity Games	December 22, 2015	July 21, 2016	Unreleased	July 21, 2016	
Winx Club: Saving Alfea	Little Orbit	Little Orbit	Unreleased	November 11, 2014	Unreleased	October 17, 2014	
Wipeout 2	Activision	Activision	Unreleased	October 11, 2011	Unreleased	Unreleased	
Wipeout 3	Activision	Activision	Unreleased	September 25, 2012	Unreleased	Unreleased	
Wipeout: Create & Crash	Behaviour Interactive	Activision	Unreleased	October 15, 2013	Unreleased	Unreleased	
Witch & Hero	FK Digital	Circle Entertainment	April 17, 2013	April 18, 2013	Unreleased	April 4, 2013	
Witch & Hero 2	RSF; Flyhigh Works	Circle Entertainment	February 17, 2016	March 24, 2016	Unreleased	April 7, 2016	
Witch & Hero 3	Flyhigh Works	Flyhigh Works	December 27, 2017	March 22, 2018	Unreleased	March 15, 2018	
Witch's Cat	Silver Star	Silver Star; Agetec	June 29, 2011	January 31, 2013	Unreleased	June 20, 2013	
Without Escape	Bumpy Trail Games	MiguelRiveraCasas	Unreleased	July 18, 2019	Unreleased	August 15, 2019	
Wizdom	Moving Player	Moving Player	Unreleased	October 22, 2015	Unreleased	October 22, 2015	
Woah Dave!	Choice Provisions	Gaijin Games	Unreleased	October 14, 2014	Unreleased	Unreleased	
Worcle Worlds	Lightwood Games	Lightwood Games	Unreleased	October 26, 2017	Unreleased	October 26, 2017	
Word Logic by Powgi	Lightwood Games	Lightwood Games	Unreleased	August 18, 2016	Unreleased	August 18, 2016	
Word Puzzles by Powgi	Lightwood Games	Lightwood Games	Unreleased	February 11, 2016	Unreleased	January 28, 2016	
Word Search 10K	Lightwood Games	Lightwood Games	Unreleased	January 26, 2017	Unreleased	January 26, 2017	
Word Search by Powgi	Lightwood Games	Lightwood Games	Unreleased	April 16, 2015	Unreleased	April 16, 2015	
Word Wizard 3D	Enjoy Gaming	Enjoy Gaming	Unreleased	November 14, 2013	Unreleased	November 21, 2013	
WordHerd	Nellyvision	Nellyvision	Unreleased	July 23, 2020	Unreleased	October 15, 2020	
WordsUp! Academy	CoderChild	CoderChild	Unreleased	May 12, 2016	Unreleased	May 12, 2016	
World Conqueror 3D	Easytech; Lionant; Circle Entertainment	Circle Entertainment	Unreleased	November 14, 2013	Unreleased	November 28, 2013	
World End Economica Episode 1	Spicy Tails	FuRyu	July 26, 2016	Unreleased	Unreleased	Unreleased	
World End Economica Episode 2	Spicy Tails	FuRyu	September 28, 2016	Unreleased	Unreleased	Unreleased	
World End Economica Episode 3	Spicy Tails	FuRyu	November 30, 2016	Unreleased	Unreleased	Unreleased	
World Soccer: Winning Eleven 2014 - Aoki Samurai no Chousen	Konami	Konami	May 22, 2014	Unreleased	Unreleased	Unreleased	
WRC FIA World Rally Championship	Firebrand Games	Bigben Interactive	Unreleased	December 4, 2014	Unreleased	December 5, 2014	
Wreck-It Ralph	Disney Interactive Studios	Activision	Unreleased	October 30, 2012	December 19, 2012	November 30, 2012	
WWE All Stars	Subdued Software	THQ	Unreleased	November 22, 2011	Unreleased	November 25, 2011	
Xeodrifter	Renegade Kid	Renegade Kid	Unreleased	December 14, 2014	June 18, 2015	Unreleased	
Xenoblade Chronicles 3D	Monolith Soft; Monster Games	Nintendo	April 2, 2015	April 10, 2015	April 2, 2015	April 2, 2015	
Yakari: The Mystery of Four-Seasons	Anuman Interactive	Anuman Interactive	Unreleased	Unreleased	Unreleased	July 2, 2015	
Yakuman Houou	Nintendo	Nintendo	February 18, 2015	Unreleased	Unreleased	Unreleased	
Yo-kai Watch	Level-5	Nintendo	July 11, 2013	November 6, 2015	December 5, 2015	April 29, 2016	
Yo-kai Watch Blasters: Red Cat Corps	Level-5	Level-5; Nintendo	July 11, 2015	September 7, 2018	September 8, 2018	September 7, 2018	
Yo-kai Watch Blasters: White Dog Squad	Level-5	Level-5; Nintendo	July 11, 2015	September 7, 2018	September 8, 2018	September 7, 2018	
Yo-kai Watch Busters 2: Treasure Legend Banbaraya Magnum	Level-5	Nintendo	December 16, 2017	Unreleased	Unreleased	Unreleased	
Yo-kai Watch Busters 2: Treasure Legend Banbaraya Sword	Level-5	Nintendo	December 16, 2017	Unreleased	Unreleased	Unreleased	
Yo-kai Sangokushi	Level-5; Koei Tecmo	Level-5; Koei Tecmo	April 2, 2016	Unreleased	Unreleased	Unreleased	
Yo-kai Watch 2: Bony Spirits	Level-5	Level-5; Nintendo	July 10, 2014	September 30, 2016	October 15, 2016	April 7, 2017	
Yo-kai Watch 2: Fleshy Souls	Level-5	Level-5; Nintendo	July 10, 2014	September 30, 2016	October 15, 2016	April 7, 2017	
Yo-kai Watch 2: Psychic Specters	Level-5	Level-5; Nintendo	December 13, 2014	September 29, 2017	September 30, 2017	September 29, 2017	
Yo-kai Watch 3	Level-5	Level-5; Nintendo	Unreleased	February 8, 2019	December 8, 2018	December 7, 2018	
Yo-kai Watch 3: Sukiyaki	Level-5	Level-5; Nintendo	December 15, 2016	Unreleased	Unreleased	Unreleased	
Yo-kai Watch 3: Sushi	Level-5	Level-5; Nintendo	July 16, 2016	Unreleased	Unreleased	Unreleased	
Yo-kai Watch 3: Tempura	Level-5	Level-5; Nintendo	July 16, 2016	Unreleased	Unreleased	Unreleased	
Yoru no Majin to Ikusa no Kuni Samayoeru Vampire	Poisoft	Poisoft	May 30, 2012	Unreleased	Unreleased	Unreleased	
Yoshi's New Island	Arzest	Nintendo	July 24, 2014	March 14, 2014	March 15, 2014	March 14, 2014	
Young Justice: Legacy	Freedom Factory Studios	Little Orbit; Warner Bros. Interactive Entertainment	Unreleased	November 19, 2013	November 21, 2013	November 22, 2013	
Yowamushi Pedal: Ashita e no High Cadence	Bandai Namco Games	Bandai Namco Games	January 29, 2015	Unreleased	Unreleased	Unreleased	
Yu-Gi-Oh! Saikyo Card Battle	Konami	Konami	July 6, 2016	Unreleased	Unreleased	Unreleased	
Yu-Gi-Oh! Zexal: World Duel Carnival	Konami	Konami	December 5, 2013	September 25, 2014	July 10, 2014	June 26, 2014	
Yumi's Odd Odyssey	Studio Saizensen	NA: Natsume Inc.; WW: Agatsuma Entertainment	June 20, 2013	March 20, 2014	April 24, 2014	April 24, 2014	
Zara the Fastest Fairy	Famous Gamous	Famous Gamous	Unreleased	April 18, 2019	Unreleased	May 2, 2019	
Zen Pinball 3D	Zen Studios	Zen Studios	Unreleased	January 12, 2012	Unreleased	December 1, 2011	
Zero Escape: Virtue's Last Reward	Chunsoft	JP: Chunsoft; NA: Aksys Games; PAL: Rising Star Games	February 16, 2012	October 23, 2012	November 29, 2012	November 23, 2012	
Zero Time Dilemma	Spike Chunsoft	Aksys Games	June 30, 2016	June 28, 2016	June 29, 2016	June 28, 2016	
Zeus Quest Remastered Anagenissis of Gaia	Crazysoft	Crazysoft	Unreleased	July 5, 2018	Unreleased	May 10, 2018	
Zig Zag Go	RCMADIAX	RCMADIAX	Unreleased	January 24, 2021	Unreleased	February 1, 2018	
Zombie Incident	CoderChild	CoderChild	Unreleased	March 5, 2015	Unreleased	February 26, 2015	
Zombie Panic in Wonderland DX	Akaoni Studio	Akaoni Studio	March 25, 2015	October 30, 2014	Unreleased	October 30, 2014	
Zombie Slayer Diox	UFO Interactive Games	JP: Cyberfront; WW: UFO Interactive Games	December 26, 2012	March 22, 2012	Unreleased	July 5, 2012	
Zombie's Cool 2	Game Museum	Arc System Works	July 17, 2013	Unreleased	Unreleased	Unreleased	
Zoo Keeper 3D	Robot	Robot	January 26, 2012	Unreleased	Unreleased	Unreleased	
Zoo Resort 3D	AQ Interactive	JP: Marvelous Entertainment; WW: Ubisoft	May 19, 2011	October 25, 2011	June 14, 2012	November 11, 2011	
Zyuden Sentai Kyoryuger: Game de Gaburincho!!	Bandai Namco Games	Bandai Namco Games	August 8, 2013	Unreleased	Unreleased	Unreleased	

== Applications ==
For applications beginning with 0–M, see 0–M.

List of Nintendo 3DS applications
Title	Developer(s)	Publisher(s)	Release date				Ref.
Title	Developer(s)	Publisher(s)	Japan	North America	Australasia	Europe	Ref.
Nanami to Issho ni Manabo! English Joutatsu no Kotsu	Media5	Media5	August 22, 2013	Unreleased	Unreleased	Unreleased	
Nanami to Issho ni Manabo! English Nichijoukaiwa	Media5	Media5	January 29, 2014	Unreleased	Unreleased	Unreleased	
NicoNico	DWANGO Co., Ltd.	DWANGO Co., Ltd.	February 14, 2014	Unreleased	Unreleased	Unreleased	
Nintendo 3DS Guide: Louvre	Nintendo	Nintendo	Unreleased	December 2, 2013	Unreleased	Unreleased	
Nintendo 3DS Internet Browser	Nintendo	Nintendo	March 27, 2011	March 27, 2011	March 27, 2011	March 27, 2011	
Nintendo Badge Arcade	Nintendo	Nintendo	December 17, 2014	November 9, 2015	November 13, 2015	November 12, 2015	
Nintendo Video	Nintendo	Nintendo	July 13, 2011	July 21, 2011	July 13, 2011	July 13, 2011	
Now I know my ABCs 2	Skunk Software	Skunk Software	Unreleased	February 1, 2018	Unreleased	Unreleased	
Painting Workshop	Collavier Corporation	Collavier Corporation	Unreleased	January 8, 2015	Unreleased	October 9, 2014	
PDI Check	Damarjian Interactive	PDI Check	Unreleased	May 23, 2019	Unreleased	Unreleased	
Phonics Fun with Biff, Chip & Kipper	IE Institute	JP: IE Institute; EU: Nintendo	April 4, 2013	Unreleased	Unreleased	September 12, 2014	
Phonics Fun with Biff, Chip & Kipper Vol. 2	IE Institute	JP: IE Institute; EU: Nintendo	April 4, 2013	Unreleased	Unreleased	September 12, 2014	
Phonics Fun with Biff, Chip & Kipper Vol. 3	IE Institute	JP: IE Institute; EU: Nintendo	April 4, 2013	Unreleased	Unreleased	September 12, 2014	
Photos with Animal Crossing	Nintendo	Nintendo	November 21, 2013	July 10, 2015	Unreleased	Unreleased	
Pixel Paint	Sanuk Games	Rainy Frog	June 29, 2016	August 25, 2016	Unreleased	August 25, 2016	
PixelMaker	Nostatic Software	Nostatic Software	Unreleased	October 27, 2016	Unreleased	October 6, 2016	
PixelMaker Studio	Nostatic Software	Nostatic Software	Unreleased	November 29, 2018	Unreleased	December 20, 2018	
Poke Transporter	Nintendo	Nintendo	December 25, 2013	February 5, 2014	Unreleased	Unreleased	
Pokedex 3D	Nintendo	Nintendo	June 6, 2011	June 17, 2011	June 7, 2011	June 7, 2011	
Pokedex 3D Pro	Nintendo	Nintendo	July 14, 2012	November 8, 2012	November 8, 2012	November 8, 2012	
Pokémon Art Academy	Headstrong Games	Nintendo; The Pokémon Company	June 19, 2014	October 24, 2014	July 5, 2014	July 4, 2014	
Pokémon Bank	Game Freak	Nintendo	December 25, 2013	February 5, 2014	February 4, 2014	February 4, 2014	
Pokemon Tretta Lab for Nintendo 3DS	Takara Tomy	Takara Tomy	August 10, 2013	Unreleased	Unreleased	Unreleased	
Recochoku	RecoChoku	RecoChoku	December 3, 2012	Unreleased	Unreleased	Unreleased	
Rytmik Ultimate	Cinemax, s.r.o.	Cinemax, s.r.o.	Unreleased	December 10, 2015	December 10, 2015	December 10, 2015	
Scarygirl Illustration Kit	Square One Games	Square One Games	Unreleased	November 13, 2014	Unreleased	Unreleased	
Shikakui Atama o Maru Kusuru. Expert Kanji - Keisan - Zukei	IE Institute	IE Institute	November 12, 2014	Unreleased	Unreleased	Unreleased	
Shikakui Atama o Maru Kusuru. Junior Kokugo - Sansuu - Shakai - Rika - Seikatsu	IE Institute	IE Institute	August 1, 2013	Unreleased	Unreleased	Unreleased	
Shikakui Atama o Maru Kusuru. Master Kokugo - Sansuu - Shakai - Rika	IE Institute	IE Institute	November 12, 2014	Unreleased	Unreleased	Unreleased	
Shin Minna no Nurie Cinnamonroll	Kadokawa Shoten	Kadokawa Shoten	December 14, 2016	Unreleased	Unreleased	Unreleased	
Shin Minna no Nurie Hello Kitty	Kadokawa Shoten	Kadokawa Shoten	November 30, 2016	Unreleased	Unreleased	Unreleased	
Shin Minna no Nurie Little Twin Stars	Kadokawa Shoten	Kadokawa Shoten	December 7, 2016	Unreleased	Unreleased	Unreleased	
Shin Minna no Nurie My Melody	Kadokawa Shoten	Kadokawa Shoten	December 7, 2016	Unreleased	Unreleased	Unreleased	
Shin Minna no Nurie Pompompurin	Kadokawa Shoten	Kadokawa Shoten	January 11, 2017	Unreleased	Unreleased	Unreleased	
Shoshinsha kara Nihonichi made Soroban Anzan Flash Anzan	Klon Co., Ltd.	Klon Co., Ltd.	March 28, 2013	Unreleased	Unreleased	Unreleased	
Smash Controller	Nintendo	Nintendo	Unreleased	June 14, 2015	Unreleased	Unreleased	
SmileBASIC	SmileBoom	SmileBoom	November 19, 2014	August 17, 2017	Unreleased	August 17, 2017	
Soroban Anzan Flash Anzan Kanzenhan	Klon Co., Ltd.	Klon Co., Ltd.	December 4, 2014	Unreleased	Unreleased	Unreleased	
Sparkle Snapshots 3D	Atlus	Nintendo	December 27, 2011	October 18, 2012	Unreleased	July 12, 2012	
Swapdoodle	Nintendo	Nintendo	November 22, 2016	November 17, 2016	Unreleased	November 17, 2016	
Swapnote	Nintendo	Nintendo	November 21, 2011	November 22, 2011	November 22, 2011	November 22, 2011	
Talking Phrasebook: 7 Languages	Sanuk Games	Sanuk Games	Unreleased	December 11, 2014	Unreleased	November 27, 2014	
Tanoshiku Omoshiroku Kanken Shogakusei	Shogakukan Production	Shogakukan Production	April 19, 2018	Unreleased	Unreleased	Unreleased	
TOEIC Test Chousoku Training	IE Institute	IE Institute	April 5, 2012	Unreleased	Unreleased	Unreleased	
Ugokasou! Chibi Chara Koubou	Collavier Corporation	Collavier Corporation	October 26, 2016	Unreleased	Unreleased	Unreleased	
Ukuku Manga Digicolo Keshikasu-kun Vol.001 Your Head is Amazing!!	Shogakkan	Shogakkan	July 13, 2016	Unreleased	Unreleased	Unreleased	
Ukuku Manga Digicolo Keshikasu-kun Vol.002 Ji-san is in big trouble!!	Shogakkan	Shogakkan	July 13, 2016	Unreleased	Unreleased	Unreleased	
Ukuku Manga Digicolo Keshikasu-kun Vol.003 Ji-san is a Mobile Phone!!	Shogakkan	Shogakkan	August 17, 2016	Unreleased	Unreleased	Unreleased	
Ukuku Manga Digicolo Keshikasu-kun Vol.004 Let's Make a Fortune!!	Shogakkan	Shogakkan	August 17, 2016	Unreleased	Unreleased	Unreleased	
Ukuku Manga Digicolo Keshikasu-kun Vol.005 Time for Dangerous News!!	Shogakkan	Shogakkan	September 14, 2016	Unreleased	Unreleased	Unreleased	
Ukuku Manga Digicolo Keshikasu-kun Vol.006 It's a Muscular Deciding Match!!	Shogakkan	Shogakkan	October 12, 2016	Unreleased	Unreleased	Unreleased	
Ukuku Manga Digicolo Keshikasu-kun Vol.007 It's a I'm with Gebe!!	Shogakkan	Shogakkan	November 9, 2016	Unreleased	Unreleased	Unreleased	
Ukuku Manga Digicolo Keshikasu-kun Vol.008 Be Careful not to Forget Anything!!	Shogakkan	Shogakkan	November 9, 2016	Unreleased	Unreleased	Unreleased	
Ukuku Manga Digicolo Keshikasu-kun Vol.009 You're Kicking a Stone!!	Shogakkan	Shogakkan	December 14, 2016	Unreleased	Unreleased	Unreleased	
Ukuku Manga Digicolo Keshikasu-kun Vol.010 Let's play Karuta!!	Shogakkan	Shogakkan	January 18, 2017	Unreleased	Unreleased	Unreleased	
Ukuku Manga Digicolo Keshikasu-kun Vol.011 Babies are Cute!!	Shogakkan	Shogakkan	February 15, 2017	Unreleased	Unreleased	Unreleased	
Ukuku Manga Digicolo Keshikasu-kun Vol.012 Pick up the Trash and Clean it Up!!	Shogakkan	Shogakkan	May 10, 2017	Unreleased	Unreleased	Unreleased	
Ukuku Manga Digicolo Keshikasu-kun Vol.013 Challenge for playing by adult!	Shogakkan	Shogakkan	August 9, 2017	Unreleased	Unreleased	Unreleased	
Ukuku Manga Digicolo Keshikasu-kun Vol.014 Let's go!	Shogakkan	Shogakkan	January 10, 2018	Unreleased	Unreleased	Unreleased	
VoxelMaker	Nostatic Software	Nostatic Software	Unreleased	August 3, 2017	Unreleased	August 10, 2017	

== Expansions ==
For expansions beginning with 0–M, see 0–M.

List of Nintendo 3DS expansions
Title	Developer(s)	Publisher(s)	Release date				Ref.
Title	Developer(s)	Publisher(s)	Japan	North America	Australasia	Europe	Ref.
Yo-kai Watch Blasters: Moon Rabbit Crew (expansion)	Level-5	Level-5; Nintendo	December 12, 2015	September 27, 2018	September 27, 2018	September 27, 2018	

== Bundles ==
For bundles beginning with 0–M, see 0–M.

List of Nintendo 3DS bundles
Title	Developer(s)	Publisher(s)	Release date				Ref.
Title	Developer(s)	Publisher(s)	Japan	North America	Australasia	Europe	Ref.
Nickelodeon Teenage Mutant Ninja Turtles: Master Splinter's Training Pack	Abstraction Games	Activision	Unreleased	November 3, 2015	Unreleased	Unreleased	
Nobunaga no Yabou / San Goku Shi Twin Pack	Koei Tecmo Games	Koei Tecmo Games	September 19, 2013	Unreleased	Unreleased	Unreleased	
Otona VS Greco: Kanji no Tou to Obaketachi - Kanzen Full Set	Media5	Media5	January 22, 2014	Unreleased	Unreleased	Unreleased	
Puzzle & Dragons Z + Super Mario Bros. Edition	GungHo Online Entertainment	Nintendo	Unreleased	May 22, 2015	May 9, 2015	May 8, 2015	
Rayman and Rabbids Family Pack	Ubisoft	Ubisoft	Unreleased	Unreleased	Unreleased	October 3, 2014	
San Goku Shi 2 / Nobunaga no Yabou 2 Twin Pack	Koei Tecmo Games	Koei Tecmo Games	August 6, 2015	Unreleased	Unreleased	Unreleased	
Sega 3D Fukkoku Archives 1 & 2 Double Pack	Sega	Sega	December 23, 2015	Unreleased	Unreleased	Unreleased	
Sega 3D Fukkoku Archives Triple Pack	Sega	Sega	December 22, 2016	Unreleased	Unreleased	Unreleased	
Shin Megami Tensei IV & Shin Megami Tensei IV: Final - Double Hero Pack	Atlus	Atlus	April 19, 2018	Unreleased	Unreleased	Unreleased	
Tetsudou Nippon! Rosen Tabi: Jouge-sen Shuuroku Double Pack	Sonic Powered	Sonic Powered	December 7, 2017	Unreleased	Unreleased	Unreleased	
Tobidase Doubutsu no Mori: amiibo+ / Tomodachi Collection: Shin Seikatsu - Happy Price Selection Double Pack	Nintendo	Nintendo	January 1, 2018	Unreleased	Unreleased	Unreleased	
Zelda no Densetsu: Toki no Ocarina 3D / Fire Emblem: Kakusei - Happy Price Selection Double Pack	Nintendo	Nintendo	January 1, 2018	Unreleased	Unreleased	Unreleased	

== See also ==
- 3D Classics
- List of cancelled Nintendo 3DS games
- List of DSiWare games and applications
- List of Nintendo DS games
- List of Nintendo Network games
- List of Nintendo Switch games
- List of Virtual Console games for Nintendo 3DS
- List of Wii U games
