= Style Savvy: Fashion Forward =

2015 video game

- North American box art
- Developer: Syn Sophia
- Publisher: Nintendo
- Directors: Yurie Hattori; Makoto Okazaki; Tetsuya Iizuka; Noriyoshi Shimazaki
- Producers: Hitoshi Yamagami; Syuji Yoshida; Masaaki Kawamura
- Programmer: Yoshiyuki Odaka
- Artist: Naoko Ayabe
- Composers: Yumi Takahashi; Masaru Tajima; Toshiyuki Sudo; Daisuke Matsuoka
- Platform: Nintendo 3DS
- Release: JP: April 16, 2015; EU: November 20, 2015; AU: November 21, 2015; NA: August 19, 2016
- Genre: Simulation
- Modes: Single player, multiplayer

Style Savvy: Fashion Forward, known as Girls Mode 3: Kirakira Coord (Note: Japanese: GIRLS MODE 3 キラキラ☆コーデ; Girls Mode 3: Kirakira Kōde lit. Girls Mode 3: Glittering Outfits) in Japan and as Nintendo Presents: New Style Boutique 2 − Fashion Forward in the PAL region, is a fashion game developed by Syn Sophia and published by Nintendo in Japan, Europe and Australia in 2015, and in North America in 2016. It is the third installment in the Style Savvy series, following Style Savvy (2008) and Style Savvy: Trendsetters (2012), and it is followed by Style Savvy: Styling Star (2017). It was well received by critics.

== Plot ==
The player character awakens to receive a letter from her Grandmother, containing a key for a small dollhouse. Upon opening the door she is met with a doll-sized girl by the name of Sophie; who explains that their Grandmothers were best friends. Sophie is thrilled by the player character's sense of fashion and invites her to help her struggling boutique in 'Beaumonde city'. Using the player character's fashion skills and Sophie's social skills the two now work together to make the city a more fashionable place to be.

Unlike the previous games, Fashion Forward allows the player to work and be paid as a hair stylist and a make-up artist alongside managing the fashion boutique.

== Release ==
The game was released for the Nintendo 3DS in Japan on April 16, 2015, in Europe on November 20, 2015, in Australia on November 21, 2015, and in North America on August 19, 2016.

== Reception ==
Reception

Aggregate score
Aggregator	Score
Metacritic	78/100

Fashion Forward was well received by critics, holding a score of 78/100 on the review aggregator Metacritic. The game went on to sell 1 million copies.
