= Style Savvy =

2008 video game

Style Savvy (NA) Nintendo presents: Style Boutique (PAL)
- Developer: Syn Sophia
- Publisher: Nintendo
- Directors: Azusa Tajima; Yurie Hattori; Hideyuki Ikeda
- Producers: Hitoshi Yamagami; Shuji Yoshida
- Composer: Atsuhiro Motoyama
- Platform: Nintendo DS
- Release: JP: October 23, 2008; EU: October 23, 2009; NA: November 2, 2009; AU: November 19, 2009
- Genre: Simulation
- Mode: Single-player

Style Savvy, known as Nintendo presents: Style Boutique in the PAL region and as Wagamama Fashion: Girls Mode (Note: Japanese: わがままファッション ガールズモード; lit. Self-Indulgent Fashion: Girls Mode) in Japan, is a fashion video game developed by Syn Sophia and published by Nintendo. It was released for the Nintendo DS on October 23, 2008, in Japan, on October 23, 2009, in Europe, and November 2, 2009, in North America. The game is followed up by three sequels for the Nintendo 3DS called Style Savvy: Trendsetters, Style Savvy: Fashion Forward, and Style Savvy: Styling Star.

== Gameplay ==
Style Savvy is played by holding the DS sideways and primarily utilizes the touch screen for input. The main gameplay loop consists of buying clothing, then selling it to customers at the player's boutique based on their tastes. The boutique can also be managed by changing the music and interior, creating ads to send to customers, holding sales, and dressing mannequins. There are various other activities available, including customizing the player character's hair and makeup, getting their picture taken during outings, and advancing the game's story by participating in fashion contests. The activities, customers, and clothing available are determined by the system date when the game is launched.

Style Savvy is a primarily single-player game with local multiplayer features. Using the DS's wireless communication features, players can visit other players' boutiques, trade flyers, and compete against one another in fashion contests. During the service life of Nintendo Wi-Fi Connection, players could also open a separate shop for online play and visit other players' shops.

== Characters ==
Dominic (美也; Miya in the Japanese version)
The owner of the character's shop. He is the only male character along with Godfrey. He is rich and is able to upgrade the player's shop.
Grace (アキ; Aki in the Japanese version)
She is the players' employer at the start of the game and works with her in Dominic's shop ("Strata" in the North American version and "Primavera" in the European version). Once the player owns their own boutique, she is able to give them advice.
Renee (ライ; Rai in the Japanese version)
An employee at the start of the game in Strata, she later works in the player's boutique.
Libby (アヤメ; Ayame in the Japanese version)
Photographer/paparazzi. She'll take pictures of your character after winning a fashion contest or when on an outing. In the NA version, she is Godfrey's granddaughter.
Roccoco (波里夫; Pario in the Japanese version)
At the top of the fashion ladder, she also hosts the fashion contests.
Felicity
Editor of the nuances magazine. Interviews the character when she wins a fashion contest (only once a month).
Eunice (雪治; Yukiji in the Japanese version)
Dominic's maid. She will visit the player's shop if their character wears the exact clothes she does.
Didi (ソラ; Sora in the Japanese version)
She owns the hair salon and is able to change the player character's hair. Will visit the player's shop and wear the purchased outfit in her salon.
Olivia (マリエ; Marie in the Japanese version)
She owns the beauty salon, where makeup can be purchased and eyebrows styled. Will visit the player's shop and wear the purchased outfit in her salon.

== Reception ==
Reception

Aggregate score
Aggregator	Score
Metacritic	73/100

Review score
Publication	Score
Nintendo Life	7/10 (Wii U eShop)

Style Savvy received "mixed or average reviews" according to Metacritic. It also—despite the lack of features compared to its sequels—has an addictive gameplay loop, and is refreshing if you are a fan of fashion according to Nintendo Life.
