= Puzzle & Dragons Z + Super Mario Bros. Edition =

2015 video game

Puzzle & Dragons Z + Puzzle & Dragons: Super Mario Bros. Edition
- North American box art
- Developer: GungHo Online Entertainment
- Publishers: JP: GungHo Online Entertainment; WW: Nintendo
- Directors: Puzzle & Dragons Z Takayuki Takahara; Naoki Fukuda; Puzzle & Dragons: Super Mario Bros. Edition; Yoshimasa Yamada
- Producer: Daisuke Yamamoto
- Composers: Puzzle & Dragons Z Kenji Ito; Yukio Nakajima; Puzzle & Dragons: Super Mario Bros. Edition; Keigo Ozaki; Toshiko Tasaki
- Series: Mario; Puzzle & Dragons
- Platform: Nintendo 3DS
- Release: Puzzle & Dragons Z: JP: December 12, 2013; Puzzle & Dragons: Super Mario Bros. Edition: JP: April 29, 2015; Puzzle & Dragons Z + Puzzle & Dragons: Super Mario Bros. Edition: KOR: May 1, 2015; EU: May 8, 2015; AU: May 9, 2015; NA: May 22, 2015
- Genres: Role-playing, puzzle
- Mode: Single-player

Puzzle & Dragons Z + Puzzle & Dragons: Super Mario Bros. Edition is a 2015 role-playing puzzle video game for Nintendo 3DS developed by GungHo Online Entertainment. It is a compilation of Puzzle & Dragons Z (2013) and Puzzle & Dragons: Super Mario Bros. Edition (2015) from the Puzzle & Dragons series for North America and Europe. Before the bundled game was announced, the first game Puzzle & Dragons Z (Note: Japanese: パズドラZ, Hepburn: Pazudora Z) was released in Japan on December 12, 2013, and Puzzle & Dragons: Super Mario Bros. Edition (Note: Japanese: パズル&ドラゴンズ スーパーマリオブラザーズ エディション, Hepburn: Pazuru & Doragonzu Sūpā Mario Burazāzu Edishon) was released in Japan on April 29, 2015. The bundled game was released in May 2015 for North America, Europe, Australia and South Korea.

== Development ==
On May 3, 2013, GungHo revealed a spin-off for the Nintendo 3DS named Puzzle & Dragons Z during the Puzzle & Dragons Fan Appreciation Festival 2013. The game was released in Japan on December 12, 2013. Gameplay is identical to the mobile game, but it adds role-playing elements such as towns and non-player characters.

Puzzle & Dragons: Super Mario Bros. Edition for the Nintendo 3DS features characters from the Super Mario series in gameplay similar to that from Puzzle & Dragons Z, including an overworld and story. It was released on April 29, 2015, in Japan as a standalone title.

The bundled game for North America, Europe, Australia, and South Korea was first announced on January 14, 2015 and was released on May 22, 2015.

== Gameplay ==
Puzzle & Dragons: Super Mario bros. Edition is a match-three game with a grid consisting of 30 orbs: six columns and five rows. One orb can be moved around at a time, displacing other orbs as they are moved and allowing orbs to be matched. Each team can have up to five members, who attack when orbs of their element are matched. Besides the orbs that are respective to each monster attribute, there are also heart orbs, which heal the player when matched, and "Z" orbs, which attack all enemies when matched. In Puzzle & Dragons, attributes deal double damage against those they are strong against. In the Super Mario Bros. edition, this value is lowered to 150%.

The grid used to move orbs is placed on the 3DS's bottom screen, with the party's icons, the player's HP, and the enemy being placed on the top screen. The game is turn-based, with each enemy attacking after a set amount of turns. By using the 3DS's shoulder buttons, or the D-pad, the player can target a particular enemy.

== Plot ==
The player character is set to take an exam to become a Dragon Tamer, and follows two of their friends — another prospective Dragon Tamer, Nick, and established Dragon Tamer Sara — to Zed City's Ranger HQ, where Dragon Tamers are issued commands and study monsters, and where the Dragon Tamer test is administered. The player, alongside Nick, receives a "D-Gear", an item which allows them to digitally store monsters, from Captain Watari.

The player meets a mysterious dragon with amnesia, who they name Syrup, and explores the Passage of Life, a dungeon hidden beneath the Ranger HQ. The evil organization Paradox attacks, whose leader, Dogma, seeks to remake the world. After Dogma tears out parts of the world in the shape of puzzle pieces, the player is tasked with defeating the five Skydragons, who have fallen under Paradox's control, and recovering the World Pieces, whose power was used to create the world and can restore it. It is later revealed that Paradox intends to use the Divine Death Dragon Arkvelza to separate the Dracomacian continents. Dogma's servant Enigma, revealed to be the mastermind behind Paradox, possesses his body as a vessel and uses Arkvelza's power to fuse with the Skydragons, becoming the ultimate entity. He nearly kills the player until Syrup reveals himself as the life Skydragon Zerclea and revives them; they defeat Enigma, leaving Dogma to reflect on his actions.

After the main game's events, the player explores the new continent of Dystopia, which has a connection to the legendary Earth Dragon King Avalon. It is revealed that dark versions of the five Skydragons have been created, who are capable of splitting the continents and who the player is tasked with stopping.

It is revealed that, 15,000 years ago, Enigma arrived on the continent of Dystopia and built towers to reach the floating islands that the Skydragons lived on. The villagers of his hometown, Eden, pleaded with the Skydragons to help them stop Enigma. Enigma then met a dragonoid named Avalon, who taught him how to transfer souls and create dark duplicates of the Skydragons. With the dragons under his command, Enigma destroyed Eden. The Skydragons sent their protector dragon Avalon Drake to stop Enigma, but Avalon Drake was easily defeated. The Prime Dragon Eidos, working with the Skydragons, separated Enigma's soul from his body and took his body to Avalon to be buried; Enigma eventually managed to regain his body using his soul transfer technique. In the present day, the player arrives in Eden and finds that Avalon is still alive and plans to continue Enigma's work. After a fight, Avalon retreats.

== Reception ==
Reception

Aggregate score
Aggregator	Score
Metacritic	73/100

Review scores
Publication	Score
Destructoid	7.5/10
Game Informer	9/10
GameRevolution	7/10
GameSpot	7/10
GamesRadar+	3.5/5
IGN	7.9/10
Nintendo Life	7/10
Nintendo World Report	7/10

The game received "mixed or average" reviews according to the review aggregation website Metacritic. IGN's Kallie Plagge awarded the game a score of 7.9 out of 10, stating "Puzzle & Dragons Super Mario Bros. Edition is the shining star alongside the less successful Z." PC Magazine's Jordan Minor also praised Puzzle & Dragons Super Mario Bros. Edition while disliking the companion character TAMADRA [sic]. He states that "Whereas Super Mario Bros. Edition uses its RPG components to enrich a pick-up-and-play puzzle game, Z tries to be a full-blown RPG that happens to center around puzzles." He also states the artwork feels uninspired in Puzzle & Dragons Super Mario Bros. Edition.

As of July 30, 2014, the game had shipped over 1.5 million copies.
