= Top Trumps: NBA All Stars =

2012 video game

- Developer: Ideas Pad
- Publisher: GMG Play
- Platforms: Nintendo 3DS, Nintendo DS, PlayStation Portable
- Release: NA: October 8, 2012
- Genre: Card game video game

Top Trumps: NBA All Stars is a video game for the Nintendo 3DS, Nintendo DS and PlayStation Portable consoles, based on the popular Top Trumps card game. It was developed by British studio Ideas Pad and published by GMG Play.

== Gameplay ==
The gameplay revolves around playing virtual games of Top Trumps based on the National Basketball Association Top Trumps packs.

When a match starts, the player and their opponent fight to gain control of the ball. This decides who takes their turn first. There are time limits to stop a player stalling when choosing their stats. Stats consist of height, free throw percentage, scoring average, assist average, rebound average and number of playoff games played. Every card the player wins against moves them closer to the basket until they shoot for it.

== See also ==
- Top Trumps
- Top Trumps Adventures
