= The Starship Damrey =

2013 video game

- Developer: Level-5
- Publisher: Level-5
- Designers: Kazuya Asano; Takemaru Abiko
- Series: Guild
- Platform: Nintendo 3DS (3DS eShop)
- Release: JP: March 27, 2013; WW: May 16, 2013
- Genre: Survival horror
- Mode: Single-player

The Starship Damrey (宇宙船ダムレイ号, Uchūsen Damurei-gō) is a first-person perspective survival horror game designed by Kazuya Asano and Takemaru Abiko. It is part of the Guild02 series, released for the 3DS eShop in 2013.

== Development ==
Izuho Numata was hired as a freelance composer for the game, but she felt the survival horror elements and tension would increase by not having any music, only relying on the sound effects. The developers agreed and outside of some of the event sequences, the entire game relies on environmental sound effects rather than BGM.

== Reception ==
Reception

Aggregate score
Aggregator	Score
Metacritic	58/100

Review scores
Publication	Score
Adventure Gamers	2.5/5
Destructoid	6/10
Edge	6/10
Eurogamer	5/10
Hardcore Gamer	2.5/5
IGN	5.3/10
Nintendo Life	7/10
Nintendo World Report	7/10
Official Nintendo Magazine	56%
Pocket Gamer	4/5
RPGFan	70%

The game received "mixed" reviews according to the review aggregation website Metacritic.
