= Style Savvy: Trendsetters =

2012 video game

- North American box art
- Developer: Syn Sophia
- Publisher: Nintendo
- Directors: Yurie Hattori; Kensuke Suzuki
- Producers: Hitoshi Yamagami; Hiromasa Tsujii; Syuji Yoshida
- Programmers: Satoshi Nakazato; Yoshiiro Hayashi
- Composers: Asuka Ito; Toshiyuki Sudo; Daisuke Shiiba
- Platform: Nintendo 3DS
- Release: JP: September 27, 2012; NA: October 22, 2012; EU: November 16, 2012; AU: November 17, 2012; KOR: September 12, 2013; Wagamama Fashion: Girls Mode Yokubari Sengen! Tokimeki Up!: JP: April 17, 2014
- Genre: Simulation
- Modes: Single player, multiplayer

Style Savvy: Trendsetters (Note: Known as Nintendo presents: New Style Boutique in the PAL region and as Wagamama Fashion: Girls Mode Yokubari Sengen! (Note: Japanese: わがままファッション ガールズモードよくばり宣言！; lit. Self-Indulgent Fashion: Girls Mode Avaricious Declaration!) in Japan) is a 2012 fashion video game developed by Syn Sophia and published by Nintendo for the Nintendo 3DS. A sequel to the Nintendo DS game Style Savvy (2008), Trendsetters was released on September 27, 2012 in Japan, on October 22, 2012 in North America and November 16, 2012 in Europe.

An updated version, Wagamama Fashion: Girls Mode Yokubari Sengen! Tokimeki Up!, (Note: Japanese: わがままファッション ガールズモード！よくばりアップ！; lit. Self-Indulgent Fashion: Girls Mode Avaricious Declaration! Heartbeat Up!) was released for retail in Japan on April 17, 2014. In January 2015, Nintendo officially announced the third installment in the series, Style Savvy: Fashion Forward, to be released in the following April in Japan.

== Gameplay ==
Style Savvy: Trendsetters is a fashion simulation game that primarily involves selecting clothing for customers as per their needs and being a fashion superstar. The game's city is accessed from an ever-expanding map, allowing the player to access their apartment, purchase new clothes and accessories from the Exhibition Hall, change their hairstyle and makeup, purchase new furniture, access their store, participate in competitions and access various locales with the purpose of activating certain events between characters. One addition to this sequel is the introduction to various choices of men's fashion.

The game also makes use of the various Nintendo 3DS features. An in-game screenshot function is supported, allowing players to take photos of a scene from the top screen at any time, saving the image as a 3D or 2D screenshot. These screenshots can then be exported to the SD card and can be viewed via the Nintendo 3DS Camera software. AR Photo Op is an additional mode which utilises the ? AR card packaged with the system to take augmented reality photographs using characters and props from the game. The Nintendo Network allows players to connect to the Fashion Plaza, where they can create and access others' Web Shops. The player's Web Shop allows them to customise the front of their store and create three outfits to sell to others, garnering additional money in-game. StreetPass is utilised to exchange Stylist Cards, which contains personalised information about the player's character and offers a link to the player's Web Shop. Using the Nintendo 3DS wireless local play, players can compete with up to three other players in a Wireless Fashion Show which pits players against one another to create an outfit that best matches a particular theme or style. Unlike the first game which was played vertically, Trendsetters and later games are played by holding the 3DS system horizontally.

== Reception ==
Reception

Aggregate score
Aggregator	Score
Metacritic	76/100

Style Savvy: Trendsetters received "generally favorable reviews", according to review aggregator Metacritic.
