= True Remembrance =

Visual novel

- Developer: Shiba Satomi
- Publisher: insani (English version)
- Designer: Shiba Satomi
- Engine: KrKr2
- Platforms: Microsoft Windows, Nintendo 3DS
- Release: Windows: JP: June 15, 2006; WW: February 14, 2008; Nintendo 3DS: JP: February 22, 2012
- Genre: Visual novel
- Mode: Single-player

True Remembrance is a free visual novel by Shiba Satomi for Microsoft Windows. The game tells of a future where many people suffer from a pandemic depression known as The Dolor. In an unnamed city, specialized doctors known as Mnemonicides treat patients who suffer from The Dolor. The game's protagonist, a young Mnemonicide named Blackiris, is given the task of curing a young girl named La of The Dolor. The game was translated to English and released in February 2008 by Insani. A remake titled True Remembrance ~Kioku no Kakera~ (TRUE REMEMBRANCE ～記憶のかけら～) was released on Nintendo 3DS's eShop on February 22, 2012.

== Gameplay ==
Like most visual novels, the gameplay consists entirely of reading text and clicking the left mouse button to advance the text. The text is accompanied by a still background, sprites of the characters in the foreground, whose expressions change during conversations but are not animated in any other way, music and sound. At certain points in the game, an event CG, an image of the current situation, is shown instead of a static background with character images in front of it.

True Remembrance also features an auto mode, which advances the text automatically so the player does not need to click, and a skip mode, which quickly skips through all text until either the player interrupts by clicking, or the game encounters text which has not yet been read by the player.

Unlike some visual novels, True Remembrance does not feature any decision points, where the player must choose between different options that may alter the story depending on the option chosen. Another feature that is common in visual novels but absent in True Remembrance is voice acting: none of the dialogue in the game is accompanied by the character's voice.

True Remembrance is also one of the rare free visual novels to have an animated opening movie, accompanied by a vocal song.

== Story ==
The story begins with an introduction of its setting: a dystopian scenario set on a modern-day timeline where severe depression has become a worldwide pandemic and is given a proper medical term - The Dolor. The only way to combat this disease that has taken the grip of humanity is the complete erasure of the memories that has triggered depression on patients. Mnemonicides, doctors with inborn telepathic powers capable of memory alteration and are specially trained for the task, are individually and periodically assigned with patients, termed as Guests, to cure the latter's condition. The series of treatments takes place in a town specifically designed for Mnemonicides and Guests to live together for the length of the entire medication. Blackiris is introduced as a top notch Alpha-class Mnemonicide, who takes on a Guest named La. The ensuing storyline unravels the daily strides that they take together and the mysterious connection that they share.

== Characters ==
Blackiris (黒目 Kurome) - A young Class Alpha Mnemonicide working in the city. The game begins with him on his way to meet up with his new client, a girl named La. He is considered something of a prodigy, having graduated from his class at the academy in only two years (the norm being anywhere from four to eight years). His powers are generally unrivaled within the city. He had a calm demeanor and is rarely fazed by anything.

La (ラ Ra) - A 17-year-old girl who comes to the City burdened with memories and secrets. She is Blackiris' client, and the two live together. She is sweet and loving, but not everyone realizes it, as her curt way of speaking causes her to come off as cold. Even though she is Blackiris' client, she never actually speaks to him about getting cured.

Rook (キョウ Kyou) - A brash young man who works at a small café called "Aroma" within the City limits and is also a Mnemonicide. He tends to be very full of himself, claiming his place is the best out there. However, in truth, he is an extremely talented chef, though he rarely gets any customers. He is easy-going and an avid fan of games. He is one of the few people Blackiris trusts.

Marcello (マール Maaru) - A young, spoiled rich boy who wants his memories erased. His family put forth a large amount of money to receive treatment from a Class Alpha Mnemonicide; Rook convinces Blackiris to take the job, but Blackiris tricks Marcello into revealing his true feelings about his memories.

Irina (イーリャ Iirya) - A young woman who sneaks into the city seeking treatment from a Mnemonicide. She is getting married and wants to have her memories of her family erased. Blackiris is initially unwilling to treat her, but eventually relents due to La's pleading. Irina is a talented cook, and repays Blackiris by cooking a meal before leaving the city.

Analye - The legendary "Alpha of Omegas" ― one of the few Class Omega Mnemonicides in the world. Every Mnemonicide knows his name ― but few have actually met him. Most of the textbooks in the academy's library were written by him, or under his supervision.

Dexter - Blackiris' direct superior, and the superintendent for many of the Mnemonicides in the city. Little else is known about this secretive figure.

Lips - A young lady Mnemonicide currently on service in the city.
