= Style Savvy: Styling Star =

2017 video game

- European cover art
- Developer: Syn Sophia
- Publisher: Nintendo
- Directors: Megumi Kurata; Makoto Okazaki; Masaaki Kawamura
- Producers: Masaaki Kawamura; Hitoshi Yamagami; Syuji Yoshida
- Programmer: Tohru Takahashi
- Artist: Lily Hoshino
- Writer: Reiko Yoshida
- Platform: Nintendo 3DS
- Release: JP: November 2, 2017; EU: November 24, 2017; AU: November 25, 2017; NA: December 25, 2017
- Genre: Simulation
- Modes: Single player, multiplayer

Style Savvy: Styling Star, (Note: Known in Japan as Girls Mode 4: Star Stylist (Japanese: Girls Mode 4: スター☆スタイリスト, Hepburn: Girls Mode 4: Sutā Sutairisuto)) known as Nintendo Presents: New Style Boutique 3 - Styling Star in the PAL region, is a fashion game published by Nintendo for the 3DS. It was developed by Syn Sophia, who also developed the other games in the Style Savvy series. It was released in Japan on November 2, 2017, in Europe on November 24, 2017, in Australia on November 25, 2017, and in North America on December 25, 2017. The game had a physical retail release in Japan, Europe and Australia, and is a digital-only release in North America.

== Gameplay ==
Gameplay involves running a fashion boutique that is bequeathed to the player by their uncle Tim. The player is responsible for choosing fashion items or full outfits that fit the specifications given by the customer. If the player's choices fit the customer's requests, the customer will purchase the item or items and build a relationship with the player over time through these transactions. The money received by the player can be used to buy more stock items for the boutique, or can be spent on hair, makeup, nails, or other miscellaneous items for the player's home or store. The player can also direct clothing, hair, makeup, and nail styling for customers of neighboring salons or boutiques, including a menswear shop.

Using the player's in-game cell phone, one can access online capabilities of the game, including an online store-front and an online market where players can sell custom-designed clothing pieces to other players. The in-game cell phone also features capabilities such as the ability to text characters to invite them to visit the boutique, salon, or beautician for a re-styling, among other features. If the player wishes to do so, they can also re-order past clothes they bought at the Exhibition Hall, that are not in stock at the Hall currently, on their cell phone.

== Possible sequel ==
In November 2019, it was reported by former Game Informer editor Imran Khan that several games for the Nintendo 3DS were cancelled mid-development due to the failure of Mario & Luigi: Bowser's Inside Story + Bowser Jr.'s Journey. A new Fire Emblem remake and entry into the Style Savvy franchise were among those named. Khan also suggested Nintendo were hoping to revive cancelled 3DS projects for the Nintendo Switch. These claims were supported by Wall Street Journal reporter Takashi Mochizuki, with him going on to state that Nintendo were interested in bringing back 3DS franchises to bolster interest in the Nintendo Switch Lite.

In February 2020, it was reported that Nintendo had filed multiple trademarks for the franchise, including use for video games, mobile games and associated merchandise.
