= Nintendo Software Planning & Development =

Former division of Nintendo

Nintendo Software Planning & Development Division
- Nintendo's logotype, used during most of the division's existence

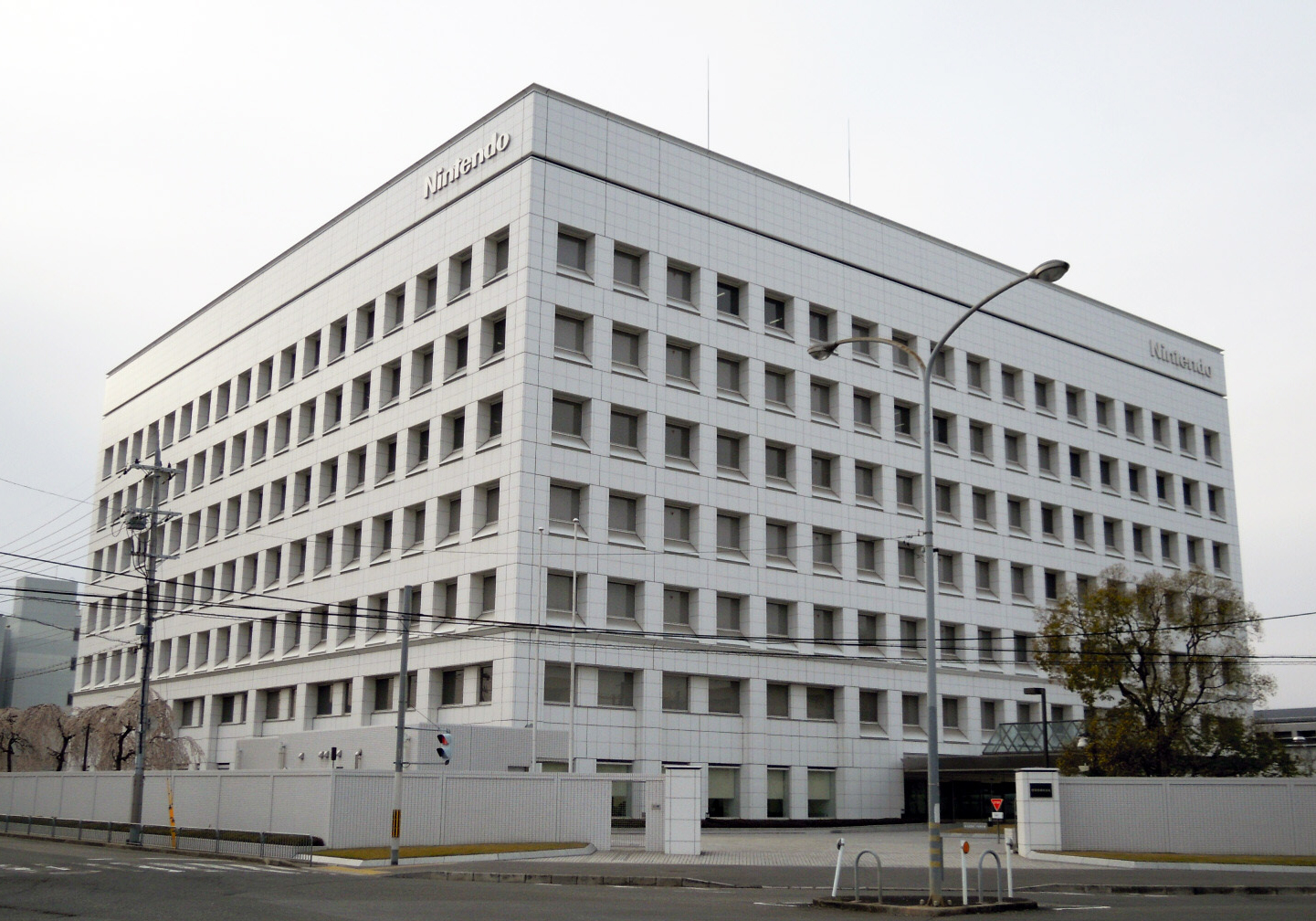
- Exterior of the Nintendo headquarters in Kyoto, Japan, which housed the division until 2014
- Native name: 任天堂企画開発本部
- Romanized name: Nintendō Kikaku Kaihatsu Honbu
- Type: Division
- Industry: Video games
- Genre: Video game development
- Predecessor: Nintendo R&D1; Nintendo R&D2
- Founded: 2004; 22 years ago in Kyoto, Japan
- Founder: Satoru Iwata
- Defunct: September 16, 2015; 11 years ago
- Fate: Merged with Nintendo Entertainment Analysis & Development to form Nintendo Entertainment Planning & Development
- Successor: Nintendo Entertainment Planning & Development
- Headquarters: Kyoto, Japan
- Key people: Satoru Iwata (Former general manager); Shinya Takahashi (General manager); Yoshio Sakamoto; Kensuke Tanabe
- Parent: Nintendo
- Divisions: Software Planning & Development; Software Development & Design

Nintendo Software Planning & Development Division, (Note: Japanese: 任天堂企画開発本部, Hepburn: Nintendō Kikaku Kaihatsu Honbu) commonly abbreviated as Nintendo SPD, was a Japanese research, planning and development division owned by Nintendo and housed inside the Nintendo Development Center in Kyoto, Japan. The division had two departments: Software Planning & Development Department, which primarily co-produced games with external developers; and Software Development & Design Department, which primarily developed experimental and system software. The division was created during a corporate restructuring in 2004, with the merger of the Nintendo R&D1 and Nintendo R&D2 departments.

The group had the task of independently developing innovative games, assisting other development teams on projects, and managing overseas production of first-party franchises. Both SPD and SDD departments were divided into four separate groups, which worked concurrently on different projects.

In September 2015, Nintendo SPD merged with Nintendo's other software development division, Entertainment Analysis & Development (EAD), becoming Nintendo Entertainment Planning & Development.

== History ==
In 2004, then-Nintendo president Satoru Iwata created the Software Planning & Development division, appointing himself as its general manager. The goal of the newly created division would be to focus on co-producing and supervising external second-party video game development, with the goal of relieving the Entertainment Analysis & Development (EAD) division, and its general manager Shigeru Miyamoto, to focus on internal development. Although that was the division's primary focus, it also went on to develop some video games titles internally.

On June 27, 2013, deputy general manager Shinya Takahashi replaced Satoru Iwata as general manager of the division, gaining a seat in Nintendo's board of directors in the process. A year later, on June 18, 2014, all of Nintendo's internal research and development divisions, including the SPD division, were moved from the Nintendo's headquarters in Kyoto to the newly built Nintendo Development Center, just 300 meters from the old building. By centralizing all of its developers in the new building, Nintendo hoped they would deeply interact with each other, regardless of which division and field they were working on, creating a synergy between hardware and software development.

On September 16, 2015, the division was merged with Nintendo's internal software development division, Entertainment Analysis & Development, becoming Nintendo Entertainment Planning & Development (EPD). As Shigeru Miyamoto retired as general manager of the EAD division and went on to become a Creative Fellow, former SPD general manager Shinya Takahashi took his place as general manager of the newly created EPD division, thus supervising all video games developed at Nintendo. The new division accumulated all of its predecessors roles as both developing video games internally and co-producing them with external developers.

== Structure ==
The General Manager of the Nintendo Software Planning & Development Division was Shinya Takahashi, assisted by both Keizo Kato, the Assistant Manager and Kensuke Tanabe, the Executive Officer. The division was split into two different departments: the Software Planning & Development Department, which was split into four separate groups and supervised by Deputy Manager Yoshio Sakamoto; and the Software Development & Design Department, which was split into three separate groups and supervised by Deputy Manager Masaru Nishita. All of the groups worked concurrently on different projects.

=== Software Planning & Development Department ===
==== Production Group No. 1 ====
The Production Group No. 1's primary focus was the development and production of video game software and software applications for Nintendo home and handheld consoles, as well as software for peripherals developed for said consoles, both internally and in cooperation with second-party developers. The group manager and main producer was Nintendo-veteran Yoshio Sakamoto. The group is responsible for developing and producing games in the WarioWare, Rhythm Heaven, Card Hero, Tomodachi and the mainline Metroid series.

List of software developed and co-produced by the Nintendo SPD Production Group No. 1
Year	Title	Series	Genre(s)	Platform(s)	Ref.
2004	WarioWare: Twisted! (Note: Co-produced with Intelligent Systems.) (Note: Hardware design by Nintendo Research & Engineering Department.)	WarioWare	Action	Game Boy Advance	
2004	WarioWare: Touched!	WarioWare	Action	Nintendo DS	
2005	Play-Yan	—N/a	MP3 player	Game Boy Advance	
2005	Nintendo MP3 Player	—N/a	MP3 player	Game Boy Micro, Nintendo DS	
2006	Rhythm Tengoku (Note: Co-produced with J.P Room.)	Rhythm Heaven	Rhythm	Game Boy Advance	
2006	WarioWare: Smooth Moves	WarioWare	Party	Wii	
2007	Face Training	—N/a	Exergaming	Nintendo DS	
2007	Nintendo DS Digital TV Tuner (software only)	—N/a	Television antenna	Nintendo DS	
2007	Kousoku Card Battle: Card Hero	Card Hero	Role-playing	Nintendo DS	
2008	Rhythm Heaven (Note: Co-produced with TNX.); Rhythm Paradise ^{EU, AUS}	Rhythm Heaven	Rhythm	Nintendo DS	
2008	Bird & Beans; Pyoro ^{EU, AUS}	WarioWare	Action	Nintendo DSi	
2008	Paper Airplane Chase; Paper Plane ^{EU, AUS}	WarioWare	Endless running	Nintendo DSi	
2008	WarioWare: Snapped!	WarioWare	Action	Nintendo DSi	
2009	Atsumeru Egaocho	—N/a	Contact list	Nintendo DSi	
2009	WarioWare D.I.Y.; WarioWare: Do It Yourself ^{EU, AUS}	WarioWare	Action	Nintendo DS	
2009	WarioWare: D.I.Y. Showcase; WarioWare: Do It Yourself Showcase ^{EU, AUS}	WarioWare	Action	Wii	
2009	Tomodachi Collection	Tomodachi	Social simulation	Nintendo DS	
2009	Card Hero: Speed Battle Custom	Card Hero	Role-playing	Nintendo DSi	
2009	Nintendo DSi Instrument Tuner	—N/a	Instrument tuning	Nintendo DSi	
2009	Nintendo DSi Metronome	—N/a	Metronome	Nintendo DSi	
2009	Face Training Mini	—N/a	Exergaming	Nintendo DSi	
2010	Metroid: Other M (Note: Co-produced with Team Ninja.)	Metroid	Action-adventure	Wii	
2011	Rhythm Heaven Fever; Beat the Beat: Rhythm Paradise ^{EU, AUS}	Rhythm Heaven	Rhythm	Wii	
2012	Kiki Trick	—N/a	Music	Wii	
2013	Tomodachi Life	Tomodachi	Social simulation	Nintendo 3DS	
2013	Game & Wario	WarioWare	Party	Wii U	
2015	Rhythm Heaven Megamix; Rhythm Paradise Megamix ^{EU, AUS}	Rhythm Heaven	Rhythm	Nintendo 3DS	

==== Production Group No. 2 ====
The Production Group No. 2 was led by manager and video game producer Hitoshi Yamagami. The group was primarily responsible for co-producing and supervising video games published by Nintendo and developed by third-party developers from Japan. They're responsible for producing and supervising games in the Pokémon, F-Zero, Legendary Starfy, Fire Emblem, Dr. Mario, Endless Ocean, Fossil Fighters, Style Savvy and Xenoblade series.

In addition to co-producing games, the group also supervised the development of Drill Dozer, developed by Game Freak.

List of video games co-produced by the Nintendo SPD Production Group No. 2
Year	Title	Series	Genre(s)	Platform(s)	Ref.
2004	Densetsu no Starfy 3 (Note: Co-produced with Tose.)	The Legendary Starfy	Platform	Game Boy Advance	
2004	Pokémon Emerald (Note: Co-produced with Game Freak.) (Note: Co-produced with Creatures, Inc.)	Pokémon	Role-playing	Game Boy Advance	
2004	Fire Emblem: The Sacred Stones (Note: Co-produced with Intelligent Systems.)	Fire Emblem	Tactical role playing	Game Boy Advance	
2004	F-Zero: Climax (Note: Co-produced with Suzak Inc.)	F-Zero	Racing	Game Boy Advance	
2004	Pokémon Dash (Note: Co-produced with Ambrella.)	Pokémon	Racing	Nintendo DS	
2005	Yakuman DS (Note: Co-produced with MediaKite.)	Yakuman	Puzzle	Nintendo DS	
2005	Fire Emblem: Path of Radiance	Fire Emblem	Tactical role-playing	GameCube	
2005	Nonono Puzzle Chalien	—N/a	Puzzle	Game Boy Advance	
2005	Advance Wars: Dual Strike	Wars	Turn-based tactics	Nintendo DS	
2005	Dance Dance Revolution: Mario Mix (Note: Co-produced with Konami.)	Mario	Music, exergaming	GameCube	
2005	Pokémon XD: Gale of Darkness (Note: Co-produced with Genius Sonority.)	Pokémon	Role-playing	GameCube	
2005	Jump Super Stars (Note: Co-produced with Ganbarion.)	—N/a	Fighting	Nintendo DS	
2005	Dr. Mario & Puzzle League	Dr. Mario	Puzzle	Game Boy Advance	
2005	Pokémon Trozei!; Pokémon Link ^{EU}	Pokémon	Puzzle	Nintendo DS	
2005	Super Princess Peach	Mario	Platform	Nintendo DS	
2005	Pokémon Mystery Dungeon: Blue Rescue Team and Red Rescue Team (Note: Co-produced with Chunsoft.)	Pokémon	Roguelike	Nintendo DS	
2006	Tetris DS	Tetris	Puzzle	Nintendo DS	
2006	Densetsu no Starfy 4	The Legendary Starfy	Platform	Nintendo DS	
2006	Mawashite Tsunageru Touch Panic (Note: Co-produced with Aki Corporation.)	—N/a	Puzzle	Nintendo DS	
2006	Project Hacker: Kakusei (Note: Co-produced with Red Entertainment.)	—N/a	Graphic adventure	Nintendo DS	
2006	Chōsōjū Mecha MG (Note: Co-produced with Sandlot.)	—N/a	Fighting	Nintendo DS	
2006	Wi-Fi Taiō Yakuman DS	Yakuman	Puzzle	Nintendo DS	
2006	Pokémon Diamond and Pearl	Pokémon	Role-playing	Nintendo DS	
2006	Jump Ultimate Stars	—N/a	Fighting	Nintendo DS	
2006	Pokémon Battle Revolution	Pokémon	Turn-based strategy	Wii	
2007	Wario: Master of Disguise	Wario	Platform	Nintendo DS	
2007	Picross DS (Note: Co-produced with Jupiter.)	Picross	Puzzle	Nintendo DS	
2007	Fire Emblem: Radiant Dawn	Fire Emblem	Tactical role-playing	Wii	
2007	Planet Puzzle League	Puzzle League	Puzzle	Nintendo DS	
2007	Kurikin Nano Island Story	—N/a	Role-playing	Nintendo DS	
2007	Brain Age 2: More Training in Minutes a Day (Note: Responsible for the western localized version. The original title was developed by the Software Development & Design Department.)	Brain Age	Edutainment	Nintendo DS	
2007	Ganbaru Watashi no Kakei Diary (Note: Co-produced with Syn Sophia.)	Ganbaru Watashi	Digital diary	Nintendo DS	
2007	Endless Ocean (Note: Co-produced with Arika.)	Endless Ocean	Adventure, simulation	Wii	
2007	Zekkyō Senshi Sakeburein	—N/a	Beat 'em up	Nintendo DS	
2007	Pokémon Mystery Dungeon: Explorers of Time and Explorers of Darkness	Pokémon	Roguelike	Nintendo DS	
2007	ASH: Archaic Sealed Heat (Note: Co-produced with Mistwalker.) (Note: Co-produced with Racjin.)	—N/a	Tactical role-playing	Nintendo DS	
2007	DS Bungaku Zenshuu	—N/a	E-reader	Nintendo DS	
2008	Wii Chess	Wii	Chess	Wii	
2008	Advance Wars: Days of Ruin	Wars	Turn-based tactics	Nintendo DS	
2008	Dr. Mario Online Rx Dr. Mario & Germ Buster ^{EU, AU}	Dr. Mario	Puzzle	Wii	
2008	Fossil Fighters	Fossil Fighters	Role-playing	Nintendo DS	
2008	Yakuman Wii: Ide Yosuke no Kenkou Mahjong (Note: Co-produced with Lancarse.)	Yakuman	Puzzle	Wii	
2008	The Legendary Starfy	The Legendary Starfy	Platform	Nintendo DS	
2008	Tsuushin Taikyoku: Hayazashi Shogi Sandan	—N/a	Puzzle	Wii	
2008	Tsuushin Taikyoku: Igo Dojo 2700-Mon	—N/a	Puzzle	Wii	
2008	Fire Emblem: Shadow Dragon	Fire Emblem	Tactical role-playing	Nintendo DS	
2008	Pokémon Platinum	Pokémon	Role-playing	Nintendo DS	
2008	Disaster: Day of Crisis (Note: Co-produced with Monolith Soft.)	—N/a	Action-adventure	Wii	
2008	Style Savvy	Style Savvy	Simulation	Nintendo DS	
2008	Dr. Mario Express A Little Bit of... Dr. Mario ^{EU, AU}	Dr. Mario	Puzzle	Wii	
2008	100 Classic Book Collection	—N/a	E-reader	Nintendo DS	
2009	Puzzle League Express	Puzzle League	Puzzle	Nintendo DSi	
2009	Yōsuke Ide no Kenkō Mahjong DSi	—N/a	Puzzle	Nintendo DSi	
2009	Pokémon Mystery Dungeon: Explorers of Sky	Pokémon	Roguelike	Nintendo DS	
2009	Sparkle Snapshots (Note: Co-produced with Atlus.)	Sparkle Snapshots	Photo filter program	Nintendo DSi	
2009	Pokémon Rumble	Pokémon	Beat 'em up	Wii	
2009	Pokémon Mystery Dungeon: Adventure Team	Pokémon	Roguelike	Wii	
2009	Ganbaru Watashi no Osaifu Ouendan	Ganbaru Watashi	Personal finance	Nintendo DSi	
2009	Metal Torrent	—N/a	Shooter	Nintendo DSi	
2009	Pokémon HeartGold and SoulSilver	Pokémon	Role-playing	Nintendo DS	
2009	Endless Ocean: Blue World; Endless Ocean 2: Adventures of the Deep ^{PAL}	Endless Ocean	Adventure, simulation	Wii	
2009	Sin & Punishment: Star Successor (Note: Co-produced with Treasure.); Sin and Punishment: Successor of the Skies ^{EU}	Sin and Punishment	Shoot 'em up	Wii	
2009	PokéPark Wii: Pikachu's Adventure	Pokémon	Action-adventure	Wii	
2010	Zangeki no Reginleiv	—N/a	Action	Wii	
2010	Xenoblade Chronicles	Xenoblade	Action role-playing	Wii	
2010	Fire Emblem: New Mystery of the Emblem	Fire Emblem	Tactical role-playing	Nintendo DS	
2010	ThruSpace	ThruSpace	Puzzle	Wii	
2010	Pokémon Black and Pokémon White	Pokémon	Role-playing	Nintendo DS	
2010	Fossil Fighters: Champions	Fossil Fighters	Role-playing	Nintendo DS	
2011	The Last Story (Note: Co-produced with AQ Interactive.)	—N/a	Action role-playing	Wii	
2011	Learn with Pokémon: Typing Adventure	Pokémon	Educational typing	Nintendo DS	
2011	Pandora's Tower	—N/a	Action role-playing	Wii	
2011	Pokédex 3D	Pokémon	Reference	Nintendo 3DS	
2011	Ketzal's Corridors	ThruSpace	Puzzle	Nintendo 3DS	
2011	Kirby's Return to Dream Land	Kirby	Action, platform	Wii	
2011	PokéPark 2: Wonders Beyond	Pokémon	Action-adventure	Wii	
2011	3D Classics: Excitebike	3D Classics; Excite	Racing	Nintendo 3DS	
2011	3D Classics: Xevious	3D Classics; Xevious	Shoot 'em up	Nintendo 3DS	
2011	3D Classics: Urban Champion	3D Classics	Fighting	Nintendo 3DS	
2011	3D Classics: Twinbee	3D Classics; Twinbee	Shoot 'em up	Nintendo 3DS	
2011	3D Classics: Kirby's Adventure	3D Classics; Kirby	Platform, action	Nintendo 3DS	
2011	3D Classics: Kid Icarus	3D Classics; Kid Icarus	Action, platform	Nintendo 3DS	
2012	Fire Emblem Awakening	Fire Emblem	Tactical role-playing	Nintendo 3DS	
2012	Pokémon Black 2 and Pokémon White 2	Pokémon	Role-playing	Nintendo DS	
2012	Pokémon Dream Radar	Pokémon	First-person shooter	Nintendo 3DS	
2012	Pokédex 3D Pro	Pokémon	Reference	Nintendo 3DS	
2012	HarmoKnight	—N/a	Rhythm	Nintendo 3DS	
2012	Style Savvy: Trendsetters	Style Savvy	Simulation	Nintendo 3DS	
2012	Wii Karaoke U	Wii	Rhythm	Wii U	
2012	Pokémon Mystery Dungeon: Gates to Infinity	Pokémon	Roguelike	Nintendo 3DS	
2013	Pokémon Rumble U	Pokémon	Action role-playing	Wii U	
2013	The Wonderful 101 (Note: Co-produced with PlatinumGames.)	—N/a	Action	Wii U	
2013	Pokémon X and Pokémon Y	Pokémon	Role-playing	Nintendo 3DS	
2013	Dr. Luigi	Dr. Mario	Puzzle	Wii U	
2014	Kirby: Triple Deluxe	Kirby	Action, platform	Nintendo 3DS	
2014	Fossil Fighters: Frontier	Fossil Fighters	Role-playing	Nintendo 3DS	
2014	Pokémon Battle Trozei; ^{EU, AU}	Pokémon	Puzzle	Nintendo 3DS	
2014	Pokémon Art Academy	Pokémon; Art Academy	Drawing game	Nintendo 3DS	
2014	Dedede's Drum Dash Deluxe	Kirby	Rhythm	Nintendo 3DS	
2014	Kirby Fighters Deluxe	Kirby	Fighting game	Nintendo 3DS	
2014	Bayonetta	Bayonetta	Action-adventure, hack and slash	Wii U	
2014	Bayonetta 2	Bayonetta	Action-adventure, hack and slash	Wii U	
2014	Pokémon Omega Ruby and Alpha Sapphire	Pokémon	Role-playing	Nintendo 3DS	
2015	Pokémon Shuffle	Pokémon	Puzzle	Nintendo 3DS	
2015	Code Name: S.T.E.A.M.	—N/a	Turn-based strategy	Nintendo 3DS	
2015	Pokémon Rumble World	Pokémon	Action role-playing	Nintendo 3DS	
2015	Style Savvy: Fashion Forward	Style Savvy	Simulation	Nintendo 3DS	
2015	Xenoblade Chronicles X	Xenoblade	Action role-playing	Wii U	
2015	Fire Emblem Fates	Fire Emblem	Tactical role-playing	Nintendo 3DS	
2015	Devil's Third (Note: Co-produced with Valhalla Game Studios.)	—N/a	Action-adventure, hack and slash, shooter	Wii U	
2015	Real Dasshutsu Game x Nintendo 3DS	—N/a	Puzzle	Nintendo 3DS	

==== Production Group No. 3 ====
The Production Group No. 3 was led by producer Kensuke Tanabe and responsible for overseeing the development of titles from the Metroid Prime, Battalion Wars, Super Mario Strikers, Mario vs. Donkey Kong, Excite, Paper Mario, Fluidity, and Donkey Kong Country series.

List of video games co-produced by the Nintendo SPD Production Group No. 3
Year	Title	Series	Genre(s)	Platform(s)	Ref.
2004	Custom Robo	Custom Robo	Fighting	GameCube	
2004	Kirby & the Amazing Mirror (Note: Co-produced with HAL Laboratory.)	Kirby	Platform	Game Boy Advance	
2004	Mario vs. Donkey Kong	Mario vs. Donkey Kong	Platform	Game Boy Advance	
2004	Donkey Kong Country 2: Diddy's Kong Quest	Donkey Kong	Platform	Game Boy Advance	
2004	Paper Mario: The Thousand-Year Door	Paper Mario	Role-playing	GameCube	
2004	Mario Pinball Land	Mario	Pinball	Game Boy Advance	
2004	Metroid Prime 2: Echoes (Note: Co-produced with Retro Studios.)	Metroid	First-person shooter	GameCube	
2005	Kirby: Canvas Curse	Kirby	Platform	Nintendo DS	
2005	Chibi-Robo!	Chibi-Robo!	Platform, adventure	GameCube	
2005	Geist (Note: Co-produced with n-Space.)	—N/a	Action-adventure	GameCube	
2005	Battalion Wars (Note: Co-produced with Kuju Entertainment.)	Wars	Action, real-time tactics	GameCube	
2005	Metroid Prime Pinball	Metroid	Pinball	Nintendo DS	
2005	Donkey Kong Country 3: Dixie Kong's Double Trouble!	Donkey Kong	Platform	Game Boy Advance	
2005	Super Mario Strikers (Note: Co-produced with Next Level Games.)	Mario Strikers	Sports	GameCube	
2005	Hamtaro Ham-Ham Challenge	Hamtaro	Sports	Nintendo DS	
2006	Metroid Prime Hunters	Metroid	First-person shooter	Nintendo DS	
2006	Mother 3	Mother	Role-playing	Game Boy Advance	
2006	Magical Starsign	—N/a	Role-playing game	Nintendo DS	
2006	bit Generations series	bit Generations	Puzzle	Game Boy Advance	
2006	Freshly-Picked Tingle's Rosy Rupeeland	The Legend of Zelda	Puzzle	Nintendo DS	
2006	Mario vs. Donkey Kong 2: March of the Minis	Mario vs. Donkey Kong	Platform	Nintendo DS	
2006	Custom Robo Arena	Custom Robo	Fighting	Nintendo DS	
2006	Kirby: Squeak Squad	Kirby	Platform	Nintendo DS	
2006	Excite Truck	Excite	Racing	Wii	
2007	Super Paper Mario	Paper Mario	Action-adventure	Wii	
2007	Mario Strikers Charged	Mario Strikers	Sports	Wii	
2007	Chibi-Robo!: Park Patrol	Chibi-Robo!	Platform	Nintendo DS	
2007	Metroid Prime 3: Corruption	Metroid	First-person shooter	Wii	
2007	Theta	—N/a	Puzzle	Nintendo DS	
2007	Battalion Wars 2	Wars	Action, real-time tactics	Wii	
2008	Super Smash Bros. Brawl	Super Smash Bros.	Fighting	Wii	
2008	Captain Rainbow	—N/a	Action-adventure	Wii	
2008	Mystery Case Files: MillionHeir	Mystery Case Files	Puzzle	Nintendo DS	
2008	Kirby Super Star Ultra	Kirby	Platform	Nintendo DS	
2008	Art Style series	Art Style	Puzzle	Wii, Nintendo DSi	
2009	New Play Control! Metroid Prime	Metroid	First-person shooter	Wii	
2009	Picross 3D	Picross 3D	Puzzle	Nintendo DS	
2009	PictureBook Games: Pop-Up Pursuit	PictureBook Games	Party game	Wii	
2009	Bonsai Barber	—N/a	Simulation	Wii	
2009	Excitebots: Trick Racing	Excite	Racing	Wii	
2009	Punch-Out!	Punch-Out!!	Sports	Wii	
2009	Mario vs. Donkey Kong: Minis March Again!	Mario vs. Donkey Kong	Platform	Nintendo DSi	
2009	New Play Control! Metroid Prime 2: Echoes	Metroid	First-person shooter	Wii	
2009	New Play Control! Chibi-Robo!	Chibi-Robo!	Platform, adventure	Wii	
2009	Okaeri! Chibi Robo! Happy Richie Dai Souji	Chibi-Robo!	Platform, adventure	Wii	
2009	Irodzuki Tingle no Koi no Balloon Trip	The Legend of Zelda	Adventure	Nintendo DS	
2009	Rock N' Roll Climber	—N/a	Simulation	Wii	
2009	Metroid Prime: Trilogy	Metroid	First-person shooter	Wii	
2009	Art Academy	Art Academy	Educational	Nintendo DSi	
2009	PictureBook Games: The Royal Bluff	PictureBook Games	Party	Nintendo DSi	
2009	Excitebike: World Rally	Excite	Racing	Wii	
2009	Eco Shooter: Plant 530	—N/a	Light-gun shooter	Wii	
2009	A Kappa's Trail	—N/a	Puzzle	Nintendo DSi	
2010	Aura-Aura Climber	—N/a	Action	Nintendo DSi	
2010	Face Pilot: Fly with your Nintendo DSi Camera!	—N/a	Flight simulation	Nintendo DSi	
2010	Art Academy (Retail Version)	Art Academy	Educational	Nintendo DS	
2010	Mario vs. Donkey Kong: Mini-Land Mayhem!	Mario vs. Donkey Kong	Platform	Nintendo DS	
2010	Donkey Kong Country Returns	Donkey Kong	Platform	Wii	
2010	Fluidity	Fluidity	Puzzle	Wii	
2011	Pilotwings Resort	Pilotwings	Flight simulation	Nintendo 3DS	
2011	Mystery Case Files: The Malgrave Incident	Mystery Case Files	Puzzle	Wii	
2011	Kirby Mass Attack	Kirby	Platform	Nintendo DS	
2011	Freakyforms: Your Creations, Alive!	—N/a	Simulation	Nintendo 3DS	
2011	Pushmo	Pushmo	Puzzle	Nintendo 3DS	
2011	Sakura Samurai: Art of the Sword	—N/a	Action-adventure	Nintendo 3DS	
2012	Dillon's Rolling Western	Dillon	Tower defense	Nintendo 3DS	
2012	Kirby's Dream Collection	Kirby	Platform	Wii	
2012	Art Academy: Lessons for Everyone!	Art Academy	Educational	Nintendo 3DS	
2012	Freakyforms Deluxe: Your Creations, Alive!	—N/a	Simulation	Nintendo 3DS	
2012	Crashmo	Pushmo	Puzzle	Nintendo 3DS	
2012	Paper Mario: Sticker Star	Paper Mario	Role-playing	Nintendo 3DS	
2012	SiNG Party	—N/a	Music	Wii U	
2013	Nintendoji	—N/a	Roguelike	Nintendo DSi	
2013	Dillon's Rolling Western: The Last Ranger	Dillon	Tower defense	Nintendo 3DS	
2013	Mario and Donkey Kong: Minis on the Move	Mario vs. Donkey Kong	Platform	Nintendo 3DS	
2013	Donkey Kong Country Returns 3D	Donkey Kong	Platform	Nintendo 3DS	
2013	Chibi-Robo! Photo Finder	Chibi-Robo!	Action-adventure	Nintendo 3DS	
2014	Donkey Kong Country: Tropical Freeze	Donkey Kong	Platform	Wii U	
2015	Mario vs. Donkey Kong: Tipping Stars	Mario vs. Donkey Kong	Platform	Wii U	
2015	Kirby and the Rainbow Curse	Kirby	Platform	Wii U	
2015	Chibi-Robo! Zip Lash	Chibi-Robo!	Platform	Nintendo 3DS	

==== Production Group No. 4 ====
The Production Group No. 4 was led by Hiroshi Sato and Toshiharu Izuno and responsible for overseeing the development of titles from the Mario Party, Mario Sports, Mario & Luigi, Yoshi, Donkey Kong, and Wii Party series.

List of video games co-produced by the Nintendo SPD Production Group No. 4
Year	Title	Genre(s)	Platform(s)	Ref.
2004	Mario Golf: Advance Tour^{6}	Sports	Game Boy Advance	
2004	Kururin Squash!^{1}	Puzzle	GameCube	
2004	Mario Power Tennis^{6}	Sports	GameCube	
2004	Mario Party 6^{4}	Party	GameCube	
2004	Yoshi's Universal Gravitation^{13}	Platform	Game Boy Advance	
2005	Mario Party Advance^{4}	Party	Game Boy Advance	
2005	DK: King of Swing^{7}	Puzzle	Game Boy Advance	
2005	Star Fox: Assault^{14}	Shooting	GameCube	
2005	Another Code: Two Memories^{3}	Adventure	Nintendo DS	
2005	Mario Superstar Baseball^{14}	Sports	GameCube	
2005	Mario Tennis: Power Tour^{6}	Sports	Game Boy Advance	
2005	Mario Party 7^{4}	Party	GameCube	
2005	Mario & Luigi: Partners in Time^{8}	Role-playing	Nintendo DS	
2006	Elite Beat Agents^{5}	Rhythm	Nintendo DS	
2006	Yoshi's Island DS^{13}	Platform	Nintendo DS	
2007	Hotel Dusk: Room 215^{3}	Adventure	Nintendo DS	
2007	Mario Party 8^{4}	Party	Wii	
2007	Donkey Kong Barrel Blast^{7}	Racing	Wii	
2007	DK: Jungle Climber^{7}	Puzzle	Nintendo DS	
2007	Mario Party DS^{4}	Party	Nintendo DS	
2008	Mario Super Sluggers^{14}	Sports	Wii	
2009	New Play Control! Mario Power Tennis^{6}	Sports	Wii	
2009	Another Code: R^{3}	Advenuture	Wii	
2009	Mario & Luigi: Bowser's Inside Story^{8}	Role-playing	Nintendo DS	
2010	Last Window: The Secret of Cape West^{3}	Adventure	Nintendo DS	
2010	Wii Party^{2}	Party	Wii	
2012	Mario Party 9^{2}	Party	Wii	
2012	Kid Icarus: Uprising^{9}	Action-adventure	Nintendo 3DS	
2012	Mario Tennis Open^{6}	Sports	Nintendo 3DS	
2013	Mario & Luigi: Dream Team^{8}	Role-playing	Nintendo 3DS	
2013	Wii Party U^{2}	Party	Wii U	
2013	Mario Party: Island Tour^{2}	Party	Nintendo 3DS	
2014	Yoshi's New Island^{12}	Platform	Nintendo 3DS	
2014	Mario Golf: World Tour^{6}	Sports	Nintendo 3DS	
2014	Super Smash Bros. for Nintendo 3DS and Wii U^{10}	Fighting	Nintendo 3DS	
2014	Super Smash Bros. for Nintendo 3DS and Wii U^{10}	Fighting	Wii U	
2015	Mario Party 10^{2}	Party	Wii U	
2015	Yoshi's Woolly World^{11}	Platform	Wii U	

===== Notes =====
- ^{1} Co-production with Eighting.
- ^{2} Co-production with NDcube.
- ^{3} Co-production with Cing.
- ^{4} Co-production with Hudson.
- ^{5} Co-production with INiS.
- ^{6} Co-production with Camelot.
- ^{7} Co-production with Paon.
- ^{8} Co-production with AlphaDream.
- ^{9} Co-production with Project Sora and Sora Ltd.
- ^{10} Co-production with Bandai Namco Studios and Sora Ltd.
- ^{11} Co-production with Good-Feel.
- ^{12} Co-production with Arzest.
- ^{13} Co-production with Artoon.
- ^{14} Co-production with Namco Bandai Games.

=== Software Development & Design Department ===
Deputy Manager: Masaru Nishita
Nintendo Software Development & Design was an experimental software development team assembled by Nintendo Co., Ltd. president Satoru Iwata. The team was originally assembled as a System Service Task Force that would develop all the unique internal system software for the Nintendo DS and Nintendo Wii. The team was responsible for all the additional Wii Channels, the Nintendo DSi system software and more recently, the Nintendo 3DS system software. Nintendo SDD also went on to develop several innovative retail games. The philosophy behind development was to think out of the box and create unique software in a timely manner with smaller development resources. The development staff was composed of Koichi Kawamoto, who was the original programmer of WarioWare, and Shinya Takahashi, who was a longtime designer at Nintendo EAD. The department was also responsible for developing several subsequent WiiWare and DSiWare software.

==== Software Development Group ====
Manager/producer: Kiyoshi Mizuki
Software Development Group was responsible for developing software from the Jam with the Band and Brain Age series, among additional Touch! Generations titles with partner developers.

List of video games developed by the Nintendo SPD Software Development Group
Year	Title	Platform(s)	Producer(s)	Ref.
2004	Band Brothers	NDS	Shinya Takahashi	
2005	DS Easy Dictionary	NDS	Shinya Takahashi	
2005	Band Brothers: Request Selection	NDS	Shinya Takahashi	
2005	Brain Age: Train Your Brain in Minutes a Day!	NDS	Shinya Takahashi	
2006	Brain Age 2: More Training in Minutes a Day!	NDS	Shinya Takahashi	
2006	English Training: Have Fun Improving Your Skills	NDS	Shinya Takahashi	
2006	Kanji Sonomama Rakubiki Jiten DS	NDS	Shinya Takahashi	
2007	More English Training	NDS	Shinya Takahashi	
2008	Flash Focus: Vision Training in Minutes a Day^{1}	NDS	Shinya Takahashi	
2008	Jam with the Band/Band Brothers DX	NDS	Shinya Takahashi	
2008	Band Brothers DX Radio	Wii	Shinya Takahashi	
2008	Brain Age Express	DSi	Shinya Takahashi	
2009	Touch Solitaire	DSi		
2009	Photo Dojo	DSi	Tomoaki Kuroume	
2009	How The Economy Works DS	NDS	Shinya Takahashi	
2011	AR Games	3DS	Tomoaki Kuroume	
2011	StreetPass Mii Plaza	3DS	Shinya Takahashi	
2012	Brain Age: Concentration Training	3DS	Kouichi Kawamoto	
2013	Band Brothers P	3DS		
2014	Rusty's Real Deal Baseball	3DS	Kouichi Kawamoto	

- ^{1} Co-production with Namco Bandai Games.
