= Card Hero =

Card Hero may refer to:

- Trade & Battle: Card Hero, a 2000 Game Boy Color title
- Kousoku Card Battle: Card Hero, a 2007 Nintendo DS title
