= Kenji Yamamoto (composer, born 1964) =

Japanese video game musician

- 山本 健誌
- Born: April 25, 1964 (age 62); Ueno, Mie, Japan
- Education: Osaka University of Arts
- Occupations: Composer, sound director, musician
- Employer: Nintendo (1987–present)
- Musical career
- Genre: Video game music
- Instruments: Piano, guitar

Kenji Yamamoto (山本 健誌, Yamamoto Kenji; born April 25, 1964) is a Japanese video game musician working for Nintendo, notable for composing music in many titles of the Metroid series, mainly Super Metroid and the Metroid Prime trilogy. Yamamoto also plays a role as a music director at Nintendo, overseeing audio for several of their games. He frequently collaborates with fellow composers Minako Hamano and Masaru Tajima.

Yamamoto's music utilizes heavy drums, piano, voiced chants, clangs of pipes, and electric guitar. In development of Super Metroid, Yamamoto came up with some of the game's themes by humming them to himself while riding his motorcycle home from work.

He was asked to compose the music for Metroid Prime to reinforce the series' continuity. Developers from Retro Studios noted how the process of fitting all the sound effects for a world in Metroid Prime into 6 MB of space was crucial in producing a quality aural experience, as each sound had to be of very high quality. Metroid Prime 3: Corruption took advantage of the increase in the amount of RAM that took place when the series switched from the GameCube to the Wii; this allowed for higher quality audio samples to be used and thus a better overall audio quality.

== Works ==
Year	Title	Role
1987	Mike Tyson's Punch-Out!!	Music with Yukio Kaneoka and Akito Nakatsuka
1988	Famicom Wars	Music with Hirokazu Tanaka
1989	Famicom Detective Club: The Girl Who Stands Behind	Music, sound effects
1992	Super Scope 6	Sound
1994	Super Metroid	Music with Minako Hamano
1995	Galactic Pinball	Music with Masaru Tajima
1997	BS Tantei Club: Yuki ni Kieta Kako	Music
1999	Famicom Bunko: Hajimari no Mori	Music with Kozue Ishikawa
2001	Mario Kart: Super Circuit	Sound support
2002	Metroid Fusion	Sound director
2002	Metroid Prime	Music with Koichi Kyuma
2004	Metroid Prime 2: Echoes	Music
2004	Metroid: Zero Mission	Music with Minako Hamano
2005	Metroid Prime Pinball	Music with Masaru Tajima
2005	Brain Age 2: More Training in Minutes a Day!	Sound director
2006	English Training: Have Fun Improving Your Skills!	Sound director
2006	Metroid Prime Hunters	Sound supervisor
2006	Excite Truck	Music with Masaru Tajima
2007	Metroid Prime 3: Corruption	Music with Minako Hamano and Masaru Tajima
2008	Super Smash Bros. Brawl	Arrangements (Note: "Main Theme (Metroid)", "Opening / Menu (Metroid Prime)")
2009	Excitebots: Trick Racing	Music with Masaru Tajima and Shinji Ushiroda
2010	Photo Dojo	Sound supervisor
2010	Donkey Kong Country Returns	Music with various others
2011	Rhythm Heaven Fever	Sound support
2011	Pilotwings Resort	Music supervisor
2011	Sakura Samurai: Art of the Sword	Music director
2011	StreetPass Mii Plaza	Sound supervisor
2012	Kiki Trick	Sound supervisor
2012	Brain Age: Concentration Training	Sound supervisor
2013	Donkey Kong Country Returns 3D	Sound supervisor
2013	Tomodachi Life	Sound supervisor
2013	StreetPass Mii Plaza	Sound director
2013	Nintendoji	Music director
2014	Donkey Kong Country: Tropical Freeze	Music with David Wise and various others, music supervisor
2014	Pokémon Art Academy	Sound supervisor
2014	Super Smash Bros. for Nintendo 3DS and Wii U	Arrangements (Note: "Donkey Kong Country Returns (Vocal)")
2015	Style Savvy: Fashion Forward	Sound supervisor
2015	Mario Tennis: Ultra Smash	Sound supervisor
2015	Real Dasshutsu Game x Nintendo 3DS	Sound director
2015	Rhythm Heaven Megamix	Sound support staff
2015	Tokyo Mirage Sessions ♯FE	Sound support
2016	Mini Mario & Friends: Amiibo Challenge	Music supervisor
2016	Disney Art Academy	Sound supervisor
2016	Miitopia	Sound supervisor
2017	Hey! Pikmin	Sound progress management
2017	Metroid: Samus Returns	Music director
2018	Sushi Striker: The Way of Sushido	Sound support
2021	Metroid Dread	Music director
2023	Metroid Prime Remastered	Music producer
2025	Metroid Prime 4: Beyond	Music with Minako Hamano
