= Rusty's Real Deal Baseball =

2013 video game

- Game icon, featuring Rusty Slugger (left) and one of his ten children (right) in front of Rusty's store
- Developer: Nintendo SPD
- Publisher: Nintendo
- Director: Katsuhiko Kanno
- Producer: Kouichi Kawamoto
- Designers: Ryosuke Suzuki, Tadashi Matsushita
- Programmers: Shinji Kitihara, Kazuki Yoshihara
- Composer: Kenji Yamamoto
- Platform: Nintendo 3DS
- Release: JP: 8 August 2013; NA: 3 April 2014; KO: 28 May 2014
- Genre: Sports
- Mode: Single-player

Rusty's Real Deal Baseball (Note: Known in Japan as Darumeshi Supōtsu-ten (Japanese: だるめしスポーツ店; lit. 'Darumeshi Sports Shop')) was a free-to-play baseball video game published by Nintendo for the Nintendo 3DS eShop. It was released in Japan in August 2013 and in North America in April 2014; the game was not released in Europe.

The game and its minigames are no longer available to download due to the Nintendo eShop closure on Nintendo 3DS.

== Gameplay ==
The Player playing Drop & Pop: Reflexes, a game purchasable at Rusty's shop.

The game features baseball themed minigames, which can be purchased individually at Rusty Slugger's store, called "Rusty Slugger's Sport Shack". The player is given a free demo of one of the minigames, but will eventually need to pay for them. While each minigame is paid through microtransactions, players can haggle with Rusty to purchase the games for a lower price. Playing the minigames will reward players with items that can be used to haggle with Rusty, which Rusty will accept and use to fix his life problems. One of Rusty's children will tell you if the price can not be lowered any further, and if a player chooses an ineffective option of dialogue, they can reset Rusty's mood with a donut for a better approach. Players can compare minigame scores with other player via StreetPass.

The game will intentionally keep players from trying to purchase the games for full price, but can still be purchased after multiple warnings. When a player pays for full price, Rusty's past mentor Pappy Van Poodle will give him the items awarded from the minigames instead.

After the Nintendo 3DS eShop closure, the minigames cannot be bought anymore, but the story can be seen in game for free.

== Development ==
Rusty's Real Deal Baseball was announced in a Nintendo Direct in 2014. According to Satoru Iwata, the concept of the game was created with the theme of "good feelings". The game's release date was announced via Twitter, and released in Japan in August 2013 and in North America in April 2014.

== Reception ==
Reception

Aggregate score
Aggregator	Score
Metacritic	74/100

Review scores
Publication	Score
Destructoid	8/10
IGN	6/10
Nintendo Life	7/10
USgamer	4/5

The game received generally favorable reviews, scoring a 74/100 on Metacritic.

The game was praised for the characters and humorous writing. Scott Thompson from IGN called the game "uncharacteristically dark" and "surprisingly funny". Chris Carter from Destructoid liked Rusty's unique dialogue and multiple choices of writing during haggling portions of the game. He appreciated Rusty's characteristics and storyline, and believed the game had "awkward silliness".
