= Pushmo World =

2014 video game

- Official logo
- Developers: Intelligent Systems; Nintendo SPD
- Publisher: Nintendo
- Directors: Taku Sugioka; Misuzu Yoshida
- Producers: Toshio Sengoku; Naoki Nakano; Hiroyuki Yamada
- Artist: Narumi Kubota
- Composer: Shoh Murakami
- Platform: Wii U
- Release: June 19, 2014
- Genre: Puzzle
- Mode: Single-player

Pushmo World, known as Pullblox World in Europe and Australia and as Hikuosu World (Note: Japanese: 引ク押ス ワールド, Hepburn: Hikuosu Wārudo) in Japan, is a puzzle game developed by Intelligent Systems and published by Nintendo for the Wii U video game console. The game is the sequel to Pushmo and Crashmo, and was released worldwide on June 19, 2014. A sequel, Stretchmo for the Nintendo 3DS, was released in 2015.

== Plot and setting ==
Mallo and children come back at the Pushmo Park for its re-opening and Papy Blox and his dog Brutus wait for them. However, similar to the first time, children are trapped within the Pushmos; they witness Brutus jumping on the "reset switches" (switches that reset the Pushmo) across all the park. Again, Mallo set across the new Pushmo Park to rescue children; when done, Brutus explains that he loves this gadget and did not want to cause the mess. Mallo later leaves with the children. The next day, Papa Blox presents to Mallo the Bonus Pushmo.

== Gameplay ==
=== Basics ===
The player, as the round cat Mallo, rescues children from atop three-dimensional, colored block puzzles called Pushmos. The player approaches a block, holds down a button, and either pulls or pushes the blocks to climb the tower. There are 250 levels.

=== Create and share ===
The game includes a puzzle editor (Pushmo Studio) wherein players can build their own puzzles and share them via QR code or an in-game World Pushmo Fair, a Miiverse online service.

The Pushmo Fair was discontinued with Miiverse on November 7, 2017, however QR code sharing is still possible.

== Development ==
The game was first announced May 28, 2014 for Wii U. It was created as a sequel to Pushmo on the Nintendo 3DS.

The game is exclusive to the Wii U.

== Reception ==
Reception

Aggregate score
Aggregator	Score
Metacritic	80/100

Review scores
Publication	Score
Destructoid	8/10
Edge	8/10
Electronic Gaming Monthly	9/10
Eurogamer	8/10
Game Informer	7.75/10
GameRevolution	7/10
GameSpot	7/10
GameTrailers	7.6/10
IGN	7.5/10
Joystiq	4/5
Official Nintendo Magazine	85%
Polygon	9/10
USgamer	4.5/5
VentureBeat	75/100
Digital Spy	3/5
National Post	8/10

Pushmo World received "favorable" reviews according to the review aggregation website Metacritic.

Polygon's Dave Tach was new to the series, but quickly liked it. He particularly appreciated the puzzles' pacing in that he felt like he continually made positive progress and never felt hopelessly stuck. Tach said the game was not customized for the home console, but did not need to be.
