= Stretchmo =

2015 video game

- Stretchmo's official logo
- Developer: Intelligent Systems
- Publisher: Nintendo
- Directors: Taku Sugioka; Misuzu Yoshida
- Producers: Toshio Sengoku; Naoki Nakano; Hiroyuki Yamada
- Programmer: Tatsuya Kikkawa
- Artist: Narumi Kubota
- Composers: Yasuhisa Baba; Takeru Kanazaki
- Platform: Nintendo 3DS
- Release: JP: May 13, 2015; WW: May 14, 2015
- Genre: Puzzle
- Mode: Single-player

Stretchmo, known as Fullblox in Europe and Australia and as Hikudasu Hippaland (Note: Japanese: 引ク出ス ヒッパランド, Hepburn: Hikudasu Hipparando) in Japan, is a downloadable puzzle game developed by Intelligent Systems and published by Nintendo for its Nintendo 3DS handheld system. The game is a sequel to Pushmo, Crashmo, and Pushmo World and was released on the Nintendo eShop.

== Overview ==
Stretchmo follows the format of previous games, where the player uses Mallo to push and pull parts of the puzzle to reach the top. This game introduces the ability to stretch pieces out in addition to pushing and pulling. Some levels also contain hazards that can attack the player.

After completing a free seven-stage demo, players can purchase four more attractions: Playtime Plaza, Sculpture Square, Fortress of Fun, and NES Expo, either individually or as a discounted set. Purchasing any attractions unlocks the Stretchmo Studio, where players can create their own puzzles and share them using QR codes. Purchasing and completing all four attractions unlocks a fifth attraction, The Perilous Peak, with more challenging puzzles.

== Reception ==
Reception

Aggregate score
Aggregator	Score
Metacritic	83/100

Review scores
Publication	Score
Destructoid	8/10
GameRevolution	8/10
GameSpot	7/10
MeriStation	8.5/10
Nintendo Life	9/10
Nintendo World Report	9/10
Metro	8/10
Reno Gazette-Journal	3.5/5

Stretchmo received "favorable" reviews according to the review aggregation website Metacritic. The game was praised for its graphics and new gameplay (especially controlling a new character) but criticized for its lack of originality and occasional technical issues.
