= Yakuman DS =

2005 video game

- Packaging artwork
- Developers: Nintendo SPD; MediaKite
- Publisher: Nintendo
- Directors: Mitsuhiro Hoshino; Azusa Tajima
- Producers: Hitoshi Yamagami; Noriyasu Kainuma; Makoto Yoshida
- Designer: Tsubasa Fujikawa
- Writer: Kiyomi Oe
- Composer: Kenichiro Iwasaki
- Series: Yakuman; Mario
- Platform: Nintendo DS
- Release: JP: March 31, 2005
- Genre: Puzzle
- Modes: Single-player, multiplayer

Yakuman DS (Note: Japanese: 役満DS, Hepburn: Yakuman DS) is a 2005 mahjong video game developed by Nintendo and MediaKite and published by Nintendo for the Nintendo DS. It is a successor to Nintendo's 1989 Game Boy game Yakuman. It features modern Japanese Mahjong rules (with riichi and dora) and various characters from the Mario video game series.

The original version was released in Japan in March 2005 by Nintendo. In September of the following year they re-released the game with an online mode and the revised title Yakuman DS with Wi-Fi Support (Note: Japanese: Wi-Fi対応役満DS, Hepburn: Wi-Fi Taiō Yakuman DS). Both versions were released only in Japan and with predominantly Japanese text.

In Japanese Mahjong, the term yakuman can refer both to the rare high-scoring limit hands and to the largest score limit that can be applied to a winning hand under Japanese Mahjong scoring rules.

== Game modes ==
- Free Play mode - in Free Play mode the player can freely choose opponents, rules and options.
- Challenge mode- in this mode the players can win by fulfilling a given set of conditions with a given set of opponents. Initially easy, normal and hard "courses" are available. Completing these unlocks characters and an expert course.
- Ranking mode - the character chosen starts at rank 20. The player plays against the other characters to ascend and possibly become rank 1 (the top three opponents are Petey Piranha, Bowser, and Toadsworth in ascending order). Note that the ranking system works by winning points from beating other players; thus the top opponents do not need to be unlocked in order to ascend above them.
- Local multiplayer - a game for multiple players (up to four), all within range of the DS wireless radio.
- Online multiplayer (2006 edition only) – like online multiplayer for other DS games, with the same Friend Code system. Voice chat is available.

== Reception ==
=== Sales ===
The game sold poorly, with both versions selling a combined total of less than 40,000 copies.
