= Flash Focus: Vision Training in Minutes a Day =

2007 video game

- Developers: Nintendo SPD; Namco Bandai Games
- Publisher: Nintendo
- Directors: Norio Egashira; Takayuki Shimamura
- Producers: Takashi Sano; Shinya Takahashi
- Designers: Yasuyuki Osada; Kunihiko Yanagida; Ryo Kimura; Sei Tsukada
- Composers: Yoshinori Kawamoto; Yoshie Arakawa
- Platform: Nintendo DS
- Release: JP: May 31, 2007; NA: October 15, 2007; EU: November 23, 2007; AU: January 17, 2008
- Genre: Puzzle
- Mode: Single player

Flash Focus: Vision Training in Minutes a Day (known as Sight Training: Enjoy Exercising and Relaxing Your Eyes in Europe and Australia) is a Touch! Generations puzzle video game developed by Namco Bandai Games and Nintendo SPD and published by Nintendo for the Nintendo DS handheld video game console. It was released in Japan on May 31, 2007, as Miru Chikara wo Jissen de Kitaeru: DS Medikara Training (Note: Known in Japan as Miru Chikara wo Jissen de Kitaeru: DS Medikara Training (見る力を実践で鍛える DS眼力トレーニング; lit. Practice Your Sight With Training: DS Eye Training) The kanji for Medikara, which is normally medikara (目力), is changed here to ganriki (眼力).) and released in North America on October 15.

The software was developed with the supervision of Hisao Ishigaki of the Aichi Institute of Technology. The game trains players how to relax their eyes and trains them to be better.

Reception has been lukewarm. Critics were unimpressed with the training exercises. It was chosen as the "Best of Nintendo DS" games at the Games Convention in Germany in August 2007.

== Gameplay ==
The interface of Flash Focus was compared much to Brain Age in the sense that it retains the same calendar interface, requires the player to sign his or her name in a box, and allows the player to design the calendar stamps. It also has a "check" program and a list of exercises, and players gradually unlock further exercises as they accumulate stamps, like Brain Age. Unlike Brain Age, the player holds the game horizontally instead of rotating it 90 degrees. Unlike the Brain Age series, where the face of creator Ryuta Kawashima prominently appears in the game, Ishigaki's face does not appear in Flash Focus.

The first part of the program is the "Eye Age Check," where players do several training exercises. The game then displays a number that tells the player how old his or her eyes are.

The training exercises are split into two groups: the "Core Training" and the "Sports Training". The Core Training games were described as the type of tests seen at an optometrist's office. The "Sports Training" involved strengthening vision through sports games such as table tennis, basketball, and baseball. For instance, in baseball, players tap the screen when the baseball enters the strike zone. Reviewers found the Sports Training games to be more visually impressive than the Core Training games.

== Development ==
Flash Focus was first shown at E3 2007, where Nintendo showed off two mini-games.

The game was developed with the help of Hisao Ishigaki, a professor in the field of sports medicine who specializes in vision research, and has helped developed computer-assisted vision training programs for professional athletes.

Ishigaki states that there are two types of eyesight, the typical check at the doctor's office and visual ability, where the eye does things such as identify several objects at once. There are five types of visual ability:

1. Dynamic visual acuity – seeing moving objects
2. Momentary vision – processing a lot of information at once
3. Eye movement – be able to move eyes around fast
4. Peripheral vision – seeing in a wide range
5. Hand–eye coordination – Seeing with the eye and accurately move with the hands

Ishigaki thinks of this game as training the brain rather than the eye muscles.

== Reception ==
In 2007 Flash Focus had an aggregate rating of 61% on GameRankings, based on 25 reviews.

Reviewers were not impressed with the training exercises. Jeff Gerstmann said that the games were "a little too easy to be fun for long" and were not as empowering as Brain Age. Craig Harris said that the games could have been in any mini-game collection and thought that at least one of the games was more hand–eye coordination than actual vision training. Gamespy simply said that there just wasn't that much to do, and that the game only allows the player to record a performance in the exercises once a day.

Both Gamespy and IGN said that the lack of an extra game (such as Sudoku or Dr. Mario in the Brain Age games) was a drawback of the title.

In the end, Gerstmann concluded that the bargain price ($US 20) was just right for this set of games, and recommended it as a fun alternative to other training games. GameSpy mostly said the same thing, recommending it to gamers who like to put their brains to the test. Harris, however, said that Nintendo needed to do "a lot better" and that the game didn't have enough to make it a "full Nintendo product".

At the Games Convention in Germany in August 2007, Flash Focus was nominated by a jury as one of the three "Best of Nintendo DS" games presented at that conference. The jury later picked the game as the best one, citing that it was "great fun".

=== Sales ===
On July 9, 2008, the game had sold 881,126 copies in Japan. It received a "Platinum" sales award from the Entertainment and Leisure Software Publishers Association (ELSPA), indicating sales of at least 300,000 copies in the United Kingdom.
