= Kiki Trick =

2012 video game

- Developer: Nintendo SPD
- Publisher: Nintendo
- Director: Noriyuki Sato
- Producer: Shinya Takahashi
- Composers: Daisuke Shiiba; Shinji Ushiroda; Shinobu Tanaka
- Platforms: Wii, Wii U
- Release: Wii: JP: January 19, 2012; Wii U: JP: June 28, 2017
- Genres: Music, party
- Modes: Single-player, multiplayer

Kiki Trick (Note: Japanese: キキトリック, Hepburn: Kikitorikku) is a music party video game developed and published by Nintendo for the Wii console. The game was released in Japan on 19 January 2012, but was never released outside of Japan. In June 2017, the game was digitally re-released in Japan via the Nintendo eShop on Wii U.

== Gameplay ==
The gameplay of Kiki Trick involves listening to a sentence with garbled speech. The player must then choose a word out of a list that completes the sentence. Players can have the sentence repeated.

The game is structured around the single-player "Mimipro" mode, which presents listening challenges in everyday situations such as a shop, interviews, an electronics store, and a kindergarten, and the dedicated 2-4 player "Kikitori Battle!" multiplayer mode, which centers on Soramimi Karuta and versus versions of four Mimipro games.

== Development ==
Yoshio Sakamoto was responsible for designing the game, with Noriyuki Sato directing the game. Sato was previously the team leader on an earlier Nintendo SPD project, the Nintendo DS Digital TV Tuner. The game is based on a proprietary technology designed by Otodesigners Co. Ltd, a Japanese sound engineering company with roots in developing hearing aids and other types of sound technology.

== Legacy ==
Noise, the host of Kiki Trick, has a cameo appearance in Super Smash Bros. Ultimate as a spirit.
