= Kousoku Card Battle: Card Hero =

2007 video game

- Developers: Nintendo SPD; Intelligent Systems
- Publisher: Nintendo
- Director: Hiroshi Momose
- Producer: Yoshio Sakamoto
- Artists: Takayasu Morisawa; Yohei Kubotsu
- Writer: Kyoko Watanabe
- Composer: Saki Kurata
- Platform: Nintendo DS
- Release: Nintendo DS: JP: December 20, 2007; DSiWare: JP: July 29, 2009
- Genre: Card battle role-playing video game
- Modes: Single player, Multiplayer

Kousoku Card Battle: Card Hero (Japanese: 高速カードバトル カードヒーロー, Hepburn: High-Speed Card Battle: Card Hero) is a card battle role-playing video game developed by Nintendo SPD and Intelligent Systems and published by Nintendo, and was released only in Japan on December 20, 2007 for the Nintendo DS. It is the successor of the Japan-only Game Boy Color title, Trade & Battle: Card Hero. An updated version was released as a DSiWare title in Japan on July 29, 2009.

It features Maruo Maruhige and some altered versions of the monsters from the previous title of the series, as well as new monsters and three new main characters: Satoru, Haruka and their rival, Kiriwo.

== Development ==
The development process mirrored the original Game Boy Color predecessor Trade & Battle: Card Hero with Yoshio Sakamoto and Nintendo R&D1 coming up with the script and character concept with the programming and design assistance coming from Intelligent Systems. For this sequel, Nintendo SPD Group No.1 (the newly reassigned remnants of Nintendo R&D1 again teamed up with Intelligent Systems. Mr. Sakamoto took on a producer role this time, with his younger staff members of Nintendo SPD Hirohi Momose (director), Kyoko Watanabe (script), and Fumiko Miyamoto (artist) handling the lead game design alongside Intelligent Systems.

No official announcement has been made about localizing the game outside Japan; however, Nintendo of America registered the Card Hero series trademark on May 8, 2009.

== Reception ==
At release, Famitsu gave the game a 36/40.
