= Crashmo =

2012 video game

- Logo
- Developer: Intelligent Systems
- Publisher: Nintendo
- Directors: Taku Sugioka; Misuzu Yoshida
- Producers: Toshio Sengoku; Naoki Nakano; Shinya Takahashi; Kensuke Tanabe; Keisuke Terasaki
- Artist: Narumi Kubota
- Composer: Shoh Murakami
- Platform: Nintendo 3DS
- Release: JP: October 31, 2012; PAL: November 15, 2012; NA: November 22, 2012
- Genre: Puzzle
- Mode: Single-player

Crashmo, (Note: known as Fallblox in Europe and Australia and as Hiku Otsu in Japan) known as Fallblox in PAL regions, is a 2012 puzzle video game developed by Intelligent Systems and published by Nintendo for the Nintendo 3DS as a Nintendo eShop exclusive. The game is a sequel to Pushmo and was released in Japan on October 31, 2012, in the PAL regions on November 15, 2012, and in North America on November 22, 2012.

In Crashmo, players controls Mallo, and are tasked with solving bite-sized platforming puzzles. The game received praise for its graphics and new features, although its high level of difficulty was met with mixed reception. Two sequels, Pushmo World for the Wii U and Stretchmo for the Nintendo 3DS, were released in 2014 and 2015 respectively. Following the closure of the Nintendo eShop on March 27, 2023, support for purchase of the game discontinued.

== Plot and setting ==
Crashmo is set in the titular Crashmo Park — a parallel park to Pushmo Park — which houses the Crashmos. One day Mallo is invited to the park by Papa Blox and meets Poppy, Papa Blox's niece. As he greets them, Mallo scares the 100 birds which carried Poppy. Scattered through the park, Mallo rescues them one by one. By the end of the day, the rescued birds carry Poppy and Mallo back to their homes. The next day, Papa Blox presents Mallo new challenges.

== Gameplay ==
Top: Mallo stands in front of a basic Crashmo puzzle.Bottom: When the teal puzzle piece is pushed, the other elements fall out. This can be used to ascend to the goal flag.

Crashmo is a puzzle platforming game played from a third-person perspective. Gameplay and presentation are similar to its predecessor, where players control Mallo through puzzles known as "Crashmos" by moving blocks and jumping to rescue frightened birds or collect flags. Returning from Pushmo, the player is able to rewind time in order to reverse mistakes.

While Pushmo used a 3D environment, its mechanics were restricted to back-and-forth movement; with the player unable to see behind the Pushmo structures. By comparison, Crashmo's puzzles are set in an area where the player can move the Crashmo puzzle elements around freely, as well as Mallo himself. The player can also rotate the camera around the puzzle at any angle.

The main feature setting Crashmos apart from Pushmos is the fact that their parts are affected by gravity. Pushing a block of one colour will cause other coloured blocks on top of it to fall. This is the main mechanic used to navigate puzzles.

Players can customize and share their own Crashmo with QR Codes.

== Reception ==
Reception

Aggregate score
Aggregator	Score
Metacritic	86/100

Review scores
Publication	Score
Edge	7/10
Electronic Gaming Monthly	8.5/10
Eurogamer	8/10
Game Informer	8.5/10
IGN	9.5/10
Joystiq	4.5/5
Nintendo Life	9/10
Nintendo World Report	9/10
Official Nintendo Magazine	87%
Pocket Gamer	4.5/5
VentureBeat	89/100
Common Sense Media	5/5

Crashmo received "generally favorable reviews" according to the review aggregation website Metacritic. Critics generally praised the graphics, music and gameplay, though its high difficulty for new players was criticized.

Eurogamer's Christian Donlan said: "Fallblox is yet another Intelligent Systems game that seems to truly know its place in the world: it's happy to be a smart little download treat that comes alive for a few minutes every night before bed." Edge's Nathan Brown said of the game, "For tenacious players and those inclined towards the genre, Fallblox could prove an irresistible draw, with clearing its parade of cryptic conundrums a delicious prospect. For others, the game's difficulty, and its visual and thematic linearity, will prove tiresome, their enthusiasm for its self-evident ingenuity petering out before each of its challenges has fallen."

Audrey Drake of IGN described the game as "amazing" and a "must download" for 3DS owners. She was surprised to see Pushmo, a game she already held in high regard, improved. Drake had high praise for the "clever" gameplay, high difficulty, character and environment design, and camera controls. Her one criticism was that the high difficulty could scare off new players.
