= Urban Champion =

1984 video game

- North American NES cover art
- Developer: Nintendo R&D1
- Publisher: Nintendo
- Producer: Gunpei Yokoi
- Designer: Makoto Kanoh
- Composer: Hirokazu Tanaka
- Platforms: Nintendo Entertainment System, arcade, Nintendo e-Reader, Nintendo 3DS
- Release: November 14, 1984: NES; JP: November 14, 1984; NA: June 1986; EU: 1986 Arcade; JP: December 10, 1984; NA: January 1985 e-Reader; NA: November 11, 2002 Nintendo 3DS; JP: July 13, 2011; WW: August 18, 2011
- Genre: Fighting
- Modes: Single-player, multiplayer
- Arcade system: Nintendo VS. System

Urban Champion (Note: Japanese: アーバンチャンピオン, Hepburn: Āban Chanpion) is a fighting video game developed and published by Nintendo for the Nintendo Entertainment System. It was first released for the Famicom and Nintendo VS. System for arcades in 1984, and later released for the NES in North America and Europe in 1986. It is Nintendo's first 2D fighting game, eventually followed by the 1993 Famicom game Joy Mech Fight. The game was poorly received, and has been retroactively regarded as one of the weaker Nintendo-published games for the NES.

== Gameplay ==
A gameplay screenshot depicting the player character on the verge of being pushed back into the street by the computer-controlled opponent

In Urban Champion, players participate in one-on-one street fights, competing with opponents to push each other off the sidewalk and past the edge of the screen. Fighters automatically assume a defensive stance when not attacking, and can raise or lower their arms to shift between blocking and attacking high or blocking and attacking low; the player must strike the area not protected by their opponent's arms to inflict damage and push the opponent back towards the screen's edge. In addition to blocking, players can hold the D-pad away from their opponent to perform a dodge or retreat. The player has access to two types of attacks: a weak punch, which does less damage and knockback but is faster and therefore harder to defend against; and a strong punch, which does more damage and knockback but takes longer to perform, making it easier to block, dodge or interrupt.

Battles use a "best 3-of-5 rounds" format. At the start of each round, both fighters move to the center of the screen and begin with 200 stamina points. Each punch costs the player one point of stamina to perform, while the weak punch inflicts four points of stamina damage and the strong punch inflicts ten points. A man will occasionally drop flower pots from the windows; if hit by a pot, a fighter will take five points of damage and be temporarily dazed. In addition, a police car may pass by at any point in the fight, which causes the fighters to return to their starting positions. If a fighter runs out of stamina, they become vulnerable and every attack will inflict the same amount of knockback on them as a strong punch. When a fighter is pushed to the edge of the screen, the round ends as they are knocked off the sidewalk onto the street, and the battle shifts to the next block for the next round. Each round also features a 99-second timer; if time runs out before the round is complete, the police will arrest the fighter closest to the edge of the screen, making the other player the winner of the round. When a fighter has lost two rounds, an open sewer manhole appears on the street behind them; the player who successfully pushes their opponent into the manhole is declared the winner, briefly celebrating as a woman showers them with confetti from a window.

The game has two gameplay modes: the single-player Game A, and the multiplayer Game B. In Game A, each time the player knocks their opponent into a manhole, a badge appears in the bottom corner of the screen denoting their victory. The goal is to earn 45 consecutive victories, at which point the player earns the rank of Champion.

== Release ==
Urban Champion was inspired by the 1984 Game & Watch game Boxing (also known as Punch-Out!!). The game was first released in Japan on November 14, 1984, for the Family Computer; it was later released in North America and Europe in 1986 for the system's western counterpart, the Nintendo Entertainment System. An arcade version was released in 1985 under the name Vs. Urban Champion.

Urban Champion has been re-released via emulation on several later Nintendo consoles. It was first re-released on November 11, 2002 as a set of cards for the Nintendo e-Reader. The game was digitally re-released for the Virtual Console service, first for the Wii in December 2006, then for the Wii U in October 2013. An updated version for the Nintendo 3DS that utilized autostereoscopic 3D was developed by Arika as part of the 3D Classics series, and was released on July 13, 2011 in Japan and the rest of the world on August 18.

Hamster Corporation released the arcade version as part of their Arcade Archives series for the Nintendo Switch on November 9, 2018. The NES version was also added to the Nintendo Classics service on July 4, 2024.

== Reception ==
Urban Champion received largely negative reception. In the special edition Pak Source included in the January/February 1990 volume of Nintendo Power, which rated all the NES games released in North America from October 1985 to March 1990, Urban Champion received (out of 5) scores of 2.5, 2.5, 1.5, and 1.5 for the four categories evaluated. Along with Chubby Cherub, it is one of the only two games to obtain a score below 2 in a category.

Retrospective reviews of the game's Virtual Console release were similarly critical. Levi Buchanan noted it as one of the weakest NES games for the Virtual Console. GameSpot's Jeff Gerstmann called it tedious when it was originally released, and in the modern day is "about as boring as it can possibly be". GamePro described it as a second tier Virtual Console game. 1UP.com's Jeremy Parish commented that he would rather have nothing at all on the Virtual Console in its debut week than Urban Champion. He also cited it as an example of a poor game that gamers would still buy for the e-Reader. He listed it as one of the worst Virtual Console games. 1UP.com's Patrick Klepek criticized Nintendo for releasing only this and Baseball in one week, calling both poor games. Writer Bob Mackey called it questionable, calling it the "Bad Street Brawler of its day". GameSpy's Phil Theobald called it "awful", criticizing its cameo in Tetris DS. IGN's Lucas M. Thomas called it too shallow for an NES game, adding that there was no reason to purchase it. He also commented that it didn't deserve the distinction of being Nintendo's first head-to-head fighting game. IGN AU's Cam Shea called it "god awful", and "worse than actually falling down a manhole". Screw Attack advised that Wii owners not waste their money on it, calling it simple and slow. However, video game developer Ron Alpert found it to be an acceptable game, calling it one of the simplest of its day, but also an easy game to pick up and play.
