= Donkey Kong Country Returns =

2010 video game

- North American cover art
- Developer: Retro Studios (Note: Nintendo 3DS version developed by Monster Games. Nvidia Shield TV version developed by Nvidia Lightspeed Studios. Nintendo Switch version developed by Forever Entertainment.)
- Publisher: Nintendo
- Director: Bryan Walker
- Producer: Kensuke Tanabe
- Designers: Kynan Pearson; Mike Wikan; Tom Ivey
- Programmer: Tim Little
- Artists: Vince Joly; Ryan Powell; Elben Schafers; Chris Voellmann; Chuck Crist; Luis Ramirez; Dax Pallotta; Derek Bonikowski; Will Bate
- Writers: Naoki Mori; Tomoe Aratani
- Composer: Kenji Yamamoto (Note: Additional music by Minako Hamano, Masaru Tajima, Shinji Ushiroda and Daisuke Matsuoka)
- Series: Donkey Kong
- Engine: Unity (HD port)
- Platforms: Wii; Nintendo 3DS; Nvidia Shield TV; Nintendo Switch
- Release: November 21, 2010: Wii; NA: November 21, 2010; AU: December 2, 2010; EU: December 3, 2010; JP: December 9, 2010 Nintendo 3DS; NA/EU: May 24, 2013; AU: May 25, 2013; JP: June 13, 2013 Nvidia Shield; CHN: July 4, 2019 Nintendo Switch; WW: January 16, 2025
- Genre: Platform
- Modes: Single-player, multiplayer

Donkey Kong Country Returns is a 2010 platform game developed by Retro Studios and published by Nintendo for the Wii console. The game was released first in North America in November 2010, and in other regions the following month. The game's story focuses on an evil group of Tiki-like creatures known as the Tiki Tak Tribe that are unleashed on Donkey Kong Island and hypnotize the island's animals into stealing Donkey Kong and Diddy Kong's banana hoard, prompting the two to traverse the island to reclaim it.

Donkey Kong Country Returns was the first installment of the Donkey Kong Country series to not involve the original series developer Rare and the first to be released after Rare's purchase by Microsoft. The game was a critical and commercial success; it has sold over 6.53 million copies worldwide, making it one of the best-selling titles on the Wii and received positive reviews for its graphics, level design, and gameplay, although its motion controls and high difficulty received more mixed responses.

A port for the Nintendo 3DS developed by Monster Games, titled Donkey Kong Country Returns 3D, was released in North America and PAL regions on May 24, 2013, in Australia the following day, and in Japan the following month. A sequel, Donkey Kong Country: Tropical Freeze, was released for the Wii U in February 2014 and for the Nintendo Switch in May 2018. A high-definition version of Donkey Kong Country Returns developed by Forever Entertainment, titled Donkey Kong Country Returns HD, was released for the Nintendo Switch on January 16, 2025.

== Gameplay ==
Donkey Kong and Diddy Kong riding a rocket barrel. Donkey Kong Country Returns combines 2D gameplay with 3D graphics such as the character models and this train in the foreground.

Players take control of the series's protagonist Donkey Kong, as well as his friend Diddy Kong in certain situations, with many traditional elements of the Donkey Kong Country series returning, including mine cart levels, the ability to swing between vines and collect bananas, the golden "KONG" letters and puzzle pieces. New gameplay elements include levels in which the characters and foreground environments appear as silhouettes, spawning several new gameplay mechanics. In single-player mode, players can only play as Donkey Kong, although Diddy Kong rides on Donkey Kong's back, and Donkey Kong can use Diddy's jetpack to jump further. Multiplayer mode enables a second player to control Diddy Kong. If a player's character dies in two-player mode, it can be brought back by using the other character to hit a "DK Barrel" that floats into view, a mechanic similar to the one used in New Super Mario Bros. Wii. To avoid problems arising from differences in the players' skills, Diddy can hop on Donkey's back to take on a more passive role, while his jetpack can be used to make his partner's jumps easier. Both Donkey and Diddy can pound the ground to defeat enemies and unveil secret items.

The game has two control schemes, with the standard system using the Wii Remote in conjunction with the Nunchuk, while a more classical approach requires that the Wii Remote be held sideways. Both methods use motion controls for the "Ground Pound" move. In addition to common series elements like secrets and unlockables, there is also an optional time attack mode. Two animal buddies, Rambi and Squawks, appear and assist Donkey Kong at certain points in the game. The game also utilises the "Super Guide" feature that previously appeared in New Super Mario Bros. Wii and Super Mario Galaxy 2. If the player loses eight lives in a single level, they will be given the option to allow a white-colored Donkey Kong named Super Kong to take over and complete the level for them, but Super Kong will not look for collectible items, nor will he show the player where they are. He also keeps anything he happens to collect, so the player is not rewarded for these items.

After beating Tiki Tong, an additional stage called "The Golden Temple" is unlocked. In order to play the stage, the player has to find objects called "Rare orbs" hidden in each world's temple. Upon completing the Golden Temple, a new mode is unlocked known as the Mirror Mode. In this mode, the stages are flipped, Donkey Kong only has one unit of health, he cannot use items bought from Cranky Kong, and he cannot get any help from Diddy Kong.

== Plot ==
The game's story revolves around creatures known as Tikis, which are new to the series. The different types of Tikis fill the role of the antagonists in the story, replacing the Kremlings from Donkey Kong Country. Cranky Kong (Takashi Nagasako), who owns shops throughout the island, is the only Kong family member that appears other than Donkey (Nagasako) and Diddy (Katsumi Suzuki). The story begins as the protagonists are awoken by a volcanic eruption on Donkey Kong Island, after a group of evil Tikis known as the Tiki Tak Tribe arrive and play music to hypnotize the animals into stealing Donkey Kong and Diddy Kong's bananas. Since Donkey Kong is resistant to the Tikis' music, he works with Diddy Kong to retrieve their hoard of bananas from the Tikis. Throughout the game, the pair travel through nine worlds to recover their stolen bananas: the Golden Temple, the Volcano, the Factory, the Cliff, the Forest, the Cave, the Ruins, the Beach, and the Jungle. In each world, they must defeat a Tiki Tak Tribe leader: Kalimba, the Maraca Gang, Gong-Oh, Banjo Bottom, Wacky Pipes, Xylobone, Cordian (who hypnotizes other inhabitants on the island to fight the Kongs), and Tiki Tong, the king of the Tiki Tak Tribe. After Tiki Tong is defeated, the Kongs are launched into space where they punch and headbutt down on the Moon, crushing Tiki Tong's base and sending bananas flying everywhere.

== Development ==
=== Conception ===
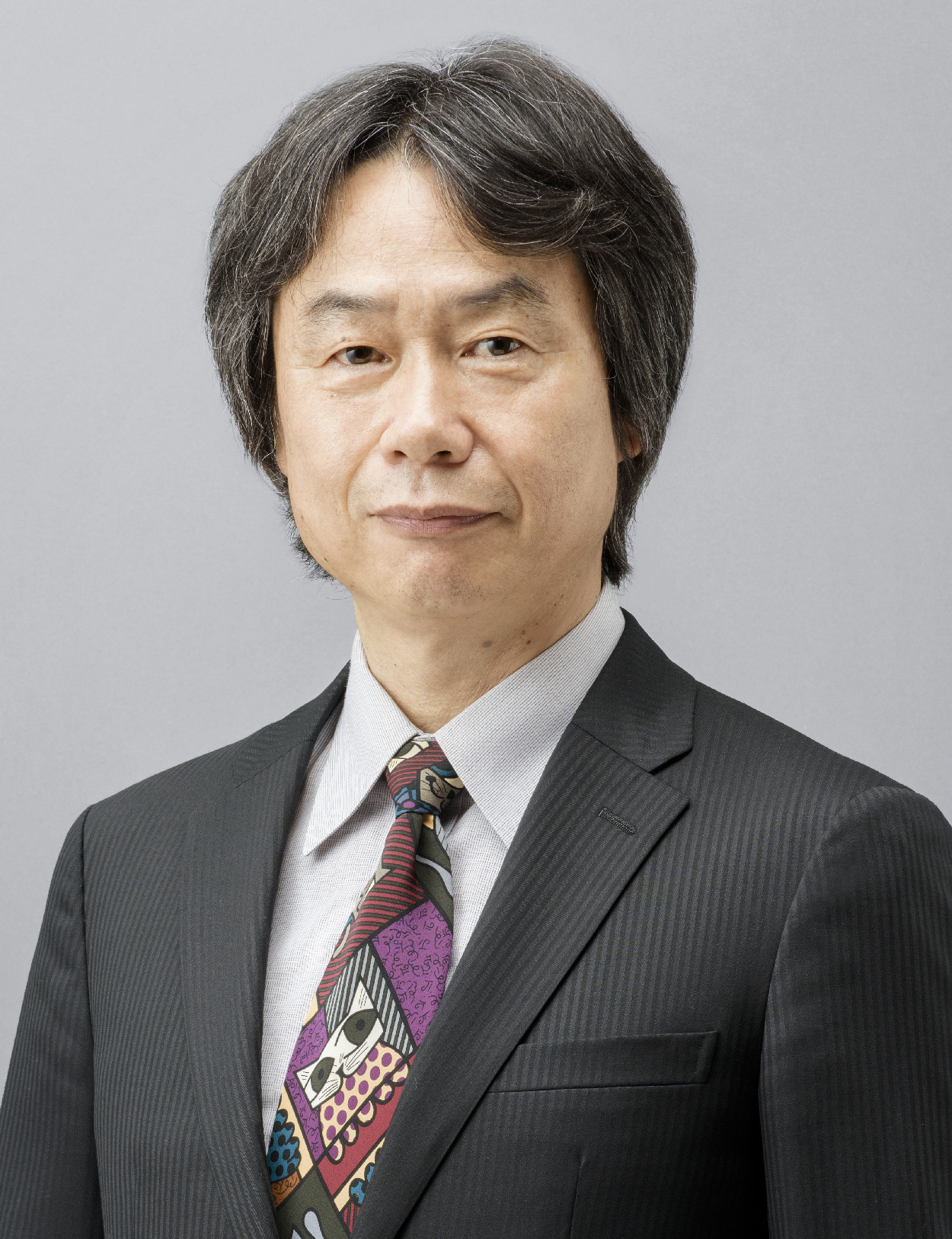
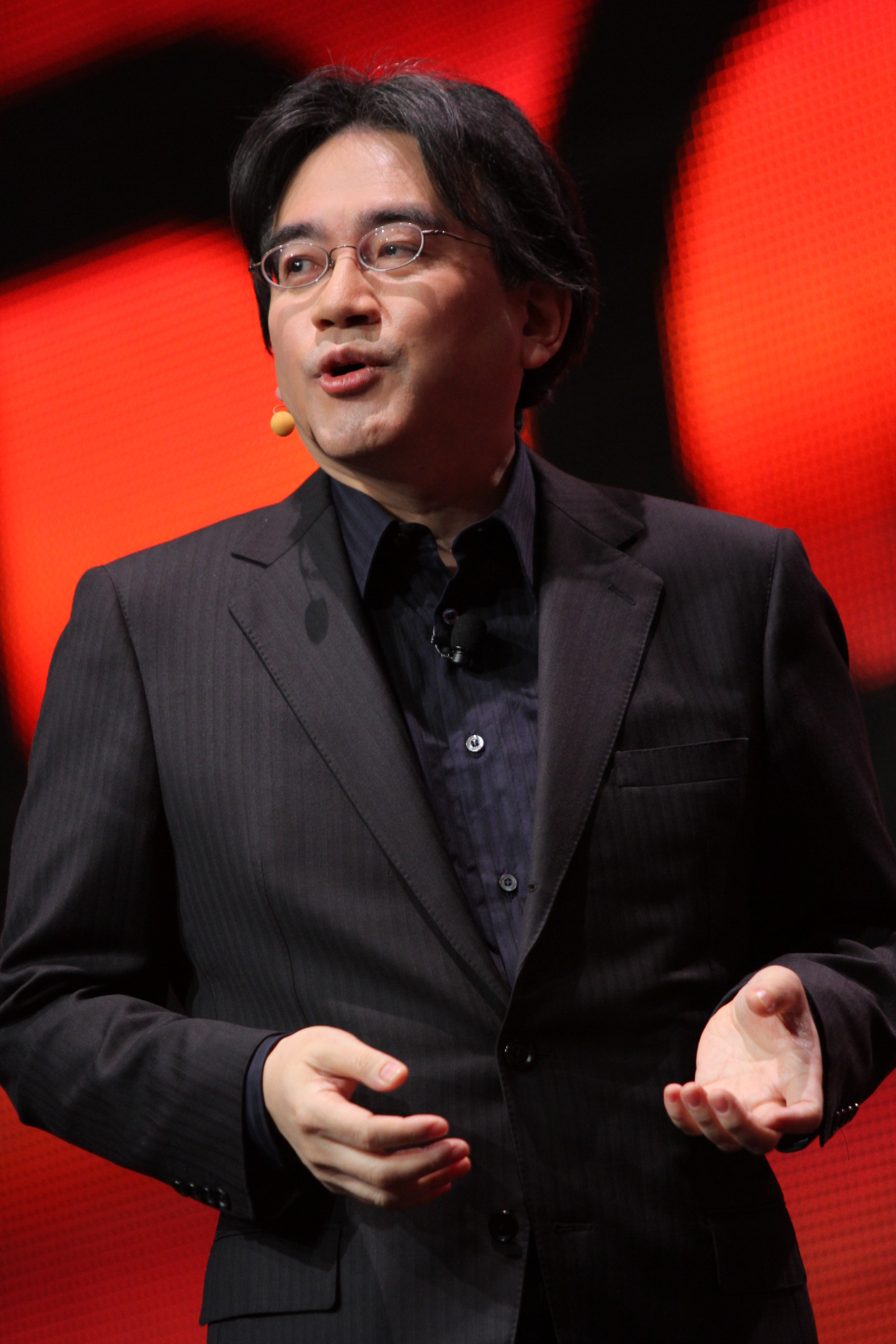
Donkey Kong creator Shigeru Miyamoto (left) and Nintendo president Satoru Iwata (right) helped determine Donkey Kong Country Returns' direction and provided input throughout the development.

The idea for Donkey Kong Country Returns originated at Retro Studios following the completion of Metroid Prime 2: Echoes in 2004, when Retro president and CEO Michael Kelbaugh told Nintendo producer Kensuke Tanabe that Retro was interested in developing a Donkey Kong game. Kelbaugh had worked as a tester on the Donkey Kong Country series for the Super Nintendo Entertainment System (SNES), which had been on a hiatus following Donkey Kong Country 3: Dixie Kong's Double Trouble! (1996). Its developer, the British studio Rare, was acquired by Nintendo's competitor Microsoft in 2002. Retro was directed to develop Metroid Prime 3: Corruption (2007) instead, Tanabe noting that Nintendo depended on Retro to make games that could not be developed in Japan.

After the completion of Corruption, Retro began experimenting for potential projects, but in April 2008, three core staff—game director Mark Pacini, art director Todd Keller, and principal technology engineer Jack Matthews—left to form Armature Studio, and those experiments had to be discarded. Tanabe was unsure what Retro's next project would be until Donkey Kong creator Shigeru Miyamoto, "totally by chance", expressed interest in a Donkey Kong Country revival. Miyamoto said that Nintendo had been receiving requests from the North American audience for a new Donkey Kong Country, and Tanabe suggested that Retro would be a suitable developer for such a project.

Retro staff flew to Nintendo's headquarters in Kyoto to meet with Miyamoto and Nintendo president Satoru Iwata, where they determined Returns' direction. Miyamoto told Retro, "Donkey Kong is my baby and you better get it right!" Iwata was confident in Retro's ability to develop the game, given that many staff were avid fans of the original Donkey Kong Country. He felt they dispelled any concerns that it was possible for a studio besides Rare to continue Donkey Kong Country. Iwata referred to the set of circumstances that led to Retro taking on Returns as goen ("fate"), so Retro chose F8 as the project's codename. Retro was excited to work on a series different from Metroid; senior designer Mike Wikan noted that Donkey Kong's light tone was a contrast from Metroid's somber one. Iwata said their passion for Donkey Kong Country "generated an energy that was poured into [Returns]".

=== Design ===
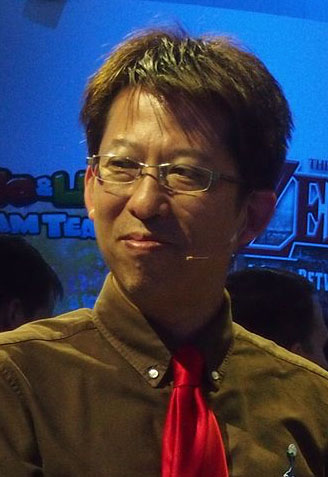
Donkey Kong Country Returns producer Kensuke Tanabe in 2013

Returns was designed for Donkey Kong Country fans, and the team spent the first week of development playing the SNES games to gather inspiration. Retro sought to carry memorable elements—such as side-scrolling gameplay, barrel cannons, and minecart sequences—while refining them to create a new experience, and continue the series' broad appeal and accessibility. The team felt a lot of responsibility because they did not want to disappoint fans. The assistant producer, Risa Tabata, had never played Donkey Kong Country, so she saw herself as the one who conceived new ideas.

Similar to the role he played during the development of Donkey Kong Country and Donkey Kong Jungle Beat (2004), Miyamoto supervised Retro and reviewed Returns' content throughout development. He wanted Retro to keep Donkey Kong Country's unique visuals and feel in mind, and emphasized elements he felt should be retained from prior games. He also mandated which characters could return. The staff worked with Miyamoto for hours to perfect Donkey Kong's movement and referred to him as "Yoda" for his input. Miyamoto suggested the blowing mechanic after playing a prototype and noticing that one of Diddy Kong's animations resembled blowing. The team was initially baffled by the suggestion, but found it added interactivity and whimsy.

Miyamoto wanted players to move similarly to Donkey Kong when he slaps the terrain, so Retro designed Returns around the Wii Remote and Nunchuk. Retro introduced the option to play without the Nunchuk following the release of New Super Mario Bros. Wii, which allowed players to hold the Wii Remote horizontally like a Nintendo Entertainment System controller. Unlike Rare's games, which allowed players to swap between the two Kongs at will, Retro designed Donkey and Diddy as a combined character. They introduced surface-clinging to expand gameplay to walls and ceilings, and chose not to include underwater levels because they did not fit the pace. Team members competed and asked each other for input, with Ivey noting coworkers sought to surprise each other. Retro felt they were able to incorporate more ideas than they were in the Metroid Prime series.

Kelbaugh decided that Returns needed to be difficult to appease Donkey Kong Country fans, but still be fair enough for inexperienced players. Pearson and Wikan wanted it to challenge players in a way that would encourage them to learn from their mistakes and keep trying. They introduced Diddy's jetpack and pop gun to ease the difficulty for inexperienced players and distinguish him from previous games. Retro was aware that the difficulty would be tough for some players to manage, so the team integrated the Super Guide system from New Super Mario Bros. Wii. Since the Metroid Prime and Donkey Kong Country series were popular among speedrunners and hardcore gamers, Retro added the time trial mode late in development.

When development began, Tanabe and Tabata discussed how they could distinguish Returns from the previous Donkey Kong game, Jungle Beat. Tanabe felt that simultaneous multiplayer was one way Returns should differ, since previous Donkey Kong games only let players take turns. Miyamoto advised Tanabe to only focus on single-player gameplay before considering multiplayer, but Tanabe still told Retro to incorporate multiplayer early in development. To distinguish Returns' multiplayer from New Super Mario Bros. Wii's and allow skilled gamers to play swiftly, Retro removed the collision detection between Donkey and Diddy. Retro refrained from lowering the difficulty for multiplayer, though the team did discuss making it easier to obtain lives and allowed Diddy to ride Donkey's back if one player was having trouble.

=== Art and programming ===
Retro wanted Returns to look "fun and whimsical" and discarded many initial designs for being too similar to Metroid's darker aesthetic. Impactful visuals were a primary focus since the original Donkey Kong Country was famous for its graphics, though Kelbaugh and director Bryan Walker said developing the silhouette levels "taught us not to rely so much on graphics". Retro retained the previous Donkey Kong Country games' art style, but developed environments using polygons rather than the pre-rendering technique that Rare used to create the SNES trilogy. Tanabe noted that unlike the SNES games, which featured static backgrounds due to technical limitations, Retro could incorporate real time animation into Returns and allow characters and backgrounds to interact. Retro drew inspiration from Virtual Boy Wario Land (1995), which allows the player to jump between the background and the foreground.

Unlike most Western game developers, Retro spent a considerable amount of time developing prototypes. For Metroid Prime, Retro based the development on its design documents, but learned from Tanabe that it was more efficient to develop prototypes first and create design documents after the gameplay had been polished. Returns was developed using the Metroid Prime game engine, but required far more detail in polygons and textures. The team noted that while audiences often perceive side-scrolling games as simple and archaic, they are actually quite difficult to develop due to the amount of care that goes into each level. They tried to adapt the Prime games' Morph Ball virtual camera system to create the side-scrolling effect, but the player character's movements were too fast and complicated for it, so a new camera system had to be developed.

Retro updated approximately two-thirds of its technology for Returns, including its renderers, animation tools, and collision detection systems. Kelbaugh and Walker estimated that every level required around three times the amount of detail that Metroid Prime 3: Corruption's did. It took around six months to shift from the Prime development environment, and Kelbaugh and Walker said that the artists had to be retrained to design a Donkey Kong game. The player character has over 2,000 animations in single-player and 6,000 in multiplayer, far greater than Samus Aran's in the Metroid Prime games, and Retro drew inspiration from Jungle Beat to develop Donkey Kong's movements. To incorporate Super Guide, the programmers rewrote the engine to remove possible randomness arising from button inputs. Retro used Super Guide to playtest and find bugs.

=== Music ===
Kenji Yamamoto, who worked with Retro on the Metroid Prime series, composed most of Donkey Kong Country Returns' soundtrack, alongside Minako Hamano, Masaru Tajima, Shinji Ushiroda, and Daisuke Matsuoka. The soundtrack mostly comprises rearrangements of tracks from the original Donkey Kong Country, composed by David Wise and Eveline Novakovic. This was at the request of Miyamoto and Iwata, who did not want Retro to change the music. Iwata considered the soundtrack a large part of Donkey Kong Country's appeal and told Tanabe to handle it with care during the first Returns meeting. Alongside rearrangements, Yamamoto composed new material to fit Returns' atmosphere. Due to the constant tweaking of the levels, he sometimes had to recompose his tracks.

Retro wanted Yamamoto to blend the classic Donkey Kong Country tracks with modern sound. He did not use a full orchestra, but focused on what Tanabe felt made Donkey Kong Country's music iconic, such as piano arrangements and the bassline. Because Rare was uninvolved, Wise, Donkey Kong Country's original composer, was unable to contribute. Wise left Rare in 2009 because he disagreed with the company's direction under Microsoft and got in contact with Kelbaugh. In 2019, Wise said that it was too late for him to contribute to Returns by the time he connected with Kelbaugh, but they stayed in contact in case Retro decided to develop a sequel. Wise felt Yamamoto "did a wonderful job" rearranging his past work, though he said he would have relied more on new compositions than past material.

=== Completion ===
The development did not begin smoothly; Tanabe described early development as "floundering around" and said that the team often disagreed as to what would be fun. Retro struggled to make a game that reflected Nintendo's values and designing the bosses. The amount of effort it took to create the level playable for a game demo at E3 2010 made the team concerned that Returns would not be ready for its deadline, and the team still had to complete around 70 levels after E3.

E3 2010 proved to be a turning point for the development; Iwata observed that "the game rapidly bloomed once [Retro] entered the final stretch", with more ideas and elements introduced. Pearson attributed the turnaround to correspondence between Nintendo and Retro: "We had come to share a certain philosophy with regards to how to make the game's levels and had achieved a common understanding of what makes a level fun. We learned the tempo necessary for a fun level and the kinds of elements to put in". Towards the end of development, Tanabe had to take a week off due to lower back pain and Tabata filled in for him. The team worked overnight during the final stages.

== Release ==
=== Context ===
Following Microsoft's acquisition of Rare, the Donkey Kong franchise's prominence faded. With no studio to develop major Donkey Kong platform games, Donkey Kong became relegated to spin-offs—such as the Donkey Konga and Mario vs. Donkey Kong series—and guest appearances in other Nintendo franchises. Donkey Kong Jungle Beat (2004), the only major DK game since Rare's Donkey Kong 64 (1999), was a commercial disappointment despite positive reviews. Hardcore Gaming 101 wrote that Jungle Beat was seen as "merely an aside to the Donkey Kong platforming saga. Seething underneath the surface of every gamer who cut their teeth on 16-bit platformers was a longing for a return to form for the wayward gorilla and his adventures... Donkey Kong Country was a brand that had a growing sense of latent desire associated with it".

Donkey Kong Country Returns was kept a secret for much of its development. In August 2009, IGN reported that Retro was known to be working on a new Wii game but was going great lengths to conceal its identity, including restricting access to parts of its headquarters. When IGN interviewer Matt Casamassina visited Retro to discuss Metroid Prime: Trilogy (2009), he was required to sign a non-disclosure agreement stipulating that if he managed to learn what the new project was, he would be unable to discuss it. Reports that the project was Donkey Kong-related surfaced shortly before Nintendo's E3 conference in June 2010.

=== Marketing ===
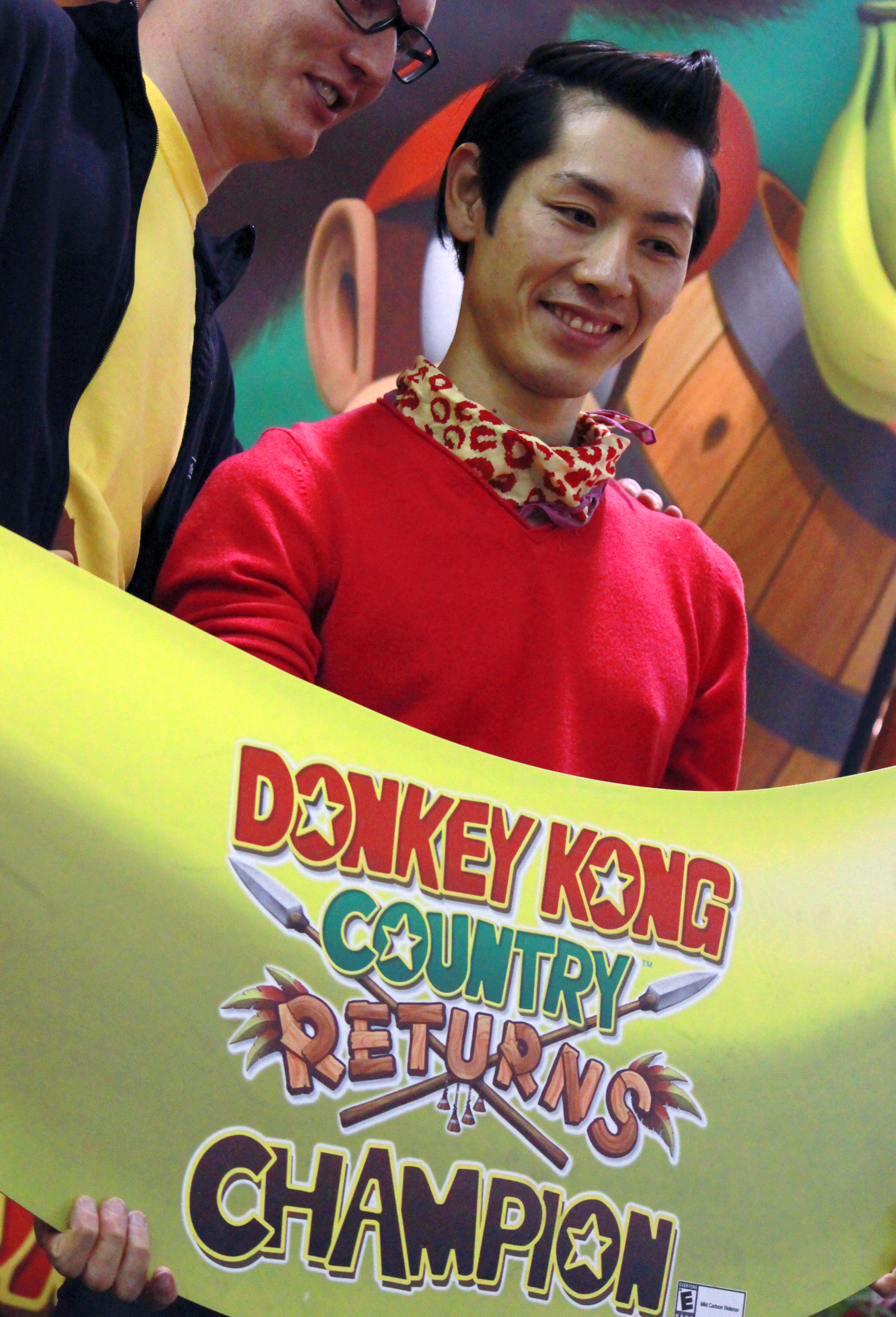
Japanese competitive eater Takeru Kobayashi at a Donkey Kong Country Returns launch event

Nintendo of America president Reggie Fils-Aimé announced Donkey Kong Country Returns during his keynote address at E3 in June 2010, when he introduced a trailer showcasing various levels and set pieces. Video game journalists considered Nintendo's showing its strongest in years and singled out Returns as one of the most significant announcements. They characterized the announcement as a surprise; a new Country game had been considered unlikely following Microsoft's acquisition of Rare. GameSpot said that the trailer sparked cheers from the crowd, with Hardcore Gaming 101 writing that Nintendo's use of the Country branding promised fans a return to form for the franchise.

Alongside Kirby's Epic Yarn, Metroid: Other M, and Wii Party, Nintendo positioned Returns to rejuvenate Wii sales in response to rising PlayStation 3 sales. It promoted the game with a series of trailers, which journalists said showcased a hardcore difficulty. One advertisement featured British comedians Ant & Dec searching for bananas in the jungle. Nintendo of America partnered with the produce distributor Chiquita to label its bananas with Donkey Kong stickers and host a contest in which customers could submit pictures of themselves dancing. Participants could win one of 31 prizes, including a Wii, a copy of Returns, and a trip to the Chichen Itza ruins in Cancún. Customers who preordered Returns through GameStop received a banana-shaped Wii Remote pouch.

On December 2, Nintendo Australia piled a five-meter (16.4 feet) stash of around 10,000 bananas, weighing two tons, at the Circular Quay in Sydney. Visitors could play Returns on an inflatable movie screen and take bananas from the stash; leftover bananas were donated to the food rescue charity OzHarvest. In the UK, Nintendo partnered with the video game retailer GAME for a promotion in which customers were asked to bring bunches of bananas to participating stores on December 3. The first 20 customers could exchange their bananas for a free copy of Returns. For another launch event, Nintendo hosted Japanese competitive eater Takeru Kobayashi, who ate 16 bananas in a minute.

=== Sales ===
Donkey Kong Country Returns was released in North America on November 21, 2010—the 16th anniversary of Donkey Kong Country's release—in Europe on December 3, and in Japan on December 9. The game sold strongly: in its opening week in Japan, it sold 163,310 copies—56.63% of its initial shipment of 288,380 copies—and over 970,000 copies by December 2012. In North America, it debuted in sixth place on the NPD Group's sales charts, with sales of 430,470. Worldwide sales reached 4.21 million in less than a month.

=== Re-releases ===
==== Nintendo 3DS ====
A Nintendo 3DS port, titled Donkey Kong Country Returns 3D, was released on May 24, 2013. The game was ported by Monster Games and is rendered with stereoscopic 3D graphics. The 3DS version includes two game modes: "Original Mode", which plays the same as the original Wii version; and "New Mode", which introduces a handful of new items to make the game easier, including extra health. This version also includes an extra world with eight new levels which are not present in the original Wii version.

==== Wii U ====
The Wii version of Donkey Kong Country Returns was released for download on Wii U via Nintendo eShop. Donkey Kong Country Returns was made available on Nintendo eShop on January 21, 2015, in Japan, January 22 in Europe, and January 23 in Australia and New Zealand. Between March 31 and June 30, 2016, inclusively, the digital re-release of Donkey Kong Country Returns was made available for North American Wii U users exclusively as a My Nintendo reward. The title had since been made commercially available on the North American Nintendo eShop starting September 22 the same year.

==== Nvidia Shield ====
Donkey Kong Country Returns was released on Nvidia Shield for the Chinese market on July 4, 2019. The Nvidia Shield version of the game is in HD unlike the Wii and Nintendo 3DS versions.

==== Nintendo Switch ====
A Nintendo Switch remaster, titled Donkey Kong Country Returns HD, was announced in a Nintendo Direct presentation in June 2024. Developed by Forever Entertainment, it was released on January 16, 2025, and includes the additional content present in 3D. An update released on January 21, 2026, added Dixie Kong as a playable character, a new Turbo Attack mode, and gameplay improvements and enhancements when playing on a Nintendo Switch 2.

== Reception ==
Donkey Kong Country Returns (3D and HD)

Aggregate scores
Aggregator	Score		
Aggregator	3DS	NS	Wii
GameRankings	83.51%	N/A	87.87%
Metacritic	83/100	77/100	87/100
OpenCritic	N/A	71% recommend (Note: Based on 113 reviews)	N/A

Review scores
Publication	Score		
Publication	3DS	NS	Wii
1Up.com	N/A	N/A	A
4Players	88/100	N/A	N/A
Computer and Video Games	N/A	N/A	8.8/10
Destructoid	10/10	8/10	10/10
Edge	N/A	N/A	7/10
Electronic Gaming Monthly	7/10	N/A	N/A
Eurogamer	8/10	N/A	9/10
Game Informer	8.5/10	8.75/10	9.5/10
GamePro	N/A	N/A	4/5
GameRevolution	4.5/5	N/A	A−
GameSpot	7/10	7/10	8.5/10
GameSpy	N/A	N/A	3.5/5
GamesRadar+	4/5	N/A	4/5
GamesTM	8/10	N/A	8/10
GameTrailers	N/A	N/A	9/10
GameZone	N/A	N/A	8/10
Giant Bomb	N/A	N/A	4/5
Hardcore Gamer	4.5/5	N/A	N/A
Hyper	90/100	N/A	N/A
IGN	8.9/10	8/10	9/10
Joystiq	N/A	N/A	4.5/5
NGamer	N/A	N/A	8.7/10
Nintendo Life	9/10	7/10	10/10
Nintendo Power	N/A	N/A	8.5/10
Nintendo World Report	8.5/10	N/A	9.5/10
Official Nintendo Magazine	80%	N/A	91%
PALGN	N/A	N/A	9/10
Play	N/A	N/A	80%
Pocket Gamer	4/5	N/A	N/A
Polygon	9/10	N/A	N/A
The Guardian	N/A	N/A	4/5
Video Games Chronicle	N/A	6/10	N/A
Video Games (DE)	N/A	N/A	88%
VideoGamer.com	8/10	N/A	8/10
X-Play	N/A	N/A	4/5

Donkey Kong Country Returns received generally favorable reviews. For its awards for games released in 2010, IGN gave Returns awards for "Best Retro Design" and "Most Challenging", then selected the game as the 5th best on the console. Game Informer named it Game of the Month for December 2010, with reviewer Dan Ryckert hailing it as "one of the best platformers [they'd] ever played". The publication later picked it as the "Best Platformer" and "Best Wii Exclusive" of 2010.

Critics lauded its graphics, level design, and fast-paced platforming and gameplay, which they saw as a return to form for the Donkey Kong Country games, but its motion controls and difficulty curve received a variety of opinions. IGN's Craig Harris awarded the game an Editor's Choice award, calling it a challenging, old-school throwback to the original Country games. Australian video game talk show Good Game's two presenters gave the game a 9 and 8.5 out of 10, praising how true the music kept to the style of the original tracks, and that it managed to keep from becoming too complex while still avoiding being over-simplified. X-Play praised the similarity of Returns to the previous games in the series, the game's replay value, and its graphics, but the review criticized the motion controls and the co-op game play. GamesRadar complimented the title for its standout levels and fan service, while criticizing it for being "hard ... in a frustrating, unclear and often misleading way" and for its implementation of motion controls. GameTrailers praised the game's gameplay and the diversity of the levels, while Giant Bomb stated that "Retro recaptures most of Donkey Kong's venerated platforming roots in this fine Wii sequel".

=== Sales ===
The game debuted third on the Japanese video game charts, with 163,310 units sold, and has sold 638,305 copies in Japan as of January 2011. In North America, the game debuted at sixth place on the charts, with 430,470 units sold. By the end of March 2011, the game had sold 4.98 million copies worldwide.

As of September 2013, the 3DS version has sold 268,000 units in the United States. As of March 2014, Donkey Kong Country Returns 3D has worldwide sales of 1.52 million units.

Both versions of this game, along with its sequel, were added to the Nintendo Selects label in March 2016, in North America.
