= Pushmo =

2011 video game

- Developer: Intelligent Systems
- Publisher: Nintendo
- Director: Taku Sugioka
- Producers: Toshio Sengoku; Naoki Nakano; Shinya Takahashi; Kensuke Tanabe; Keisuke Terasaki
- Artists: Eiko Hirao; Daisuke Yasumatsu
- Composer: Shoh Murakami
- Platform: Nintendo 3DS
- Release: JP: October 5, 2011; WW: December 8, 2011
- Genre: Puzzle
- Mode: Single-player

Pushmo (Note: known as Pullblox in Europe and Australia and Hikuosu in Japan), known as Pullblox in PAL regions, is a downloadable puzzle game developed by Intelligent Systems and published by Nintendo for its Nintendo 3DS handheld system, available on the Nintendo eShop. In the game, players must shift around puzzle blocks in order to create steps and platforms, ultimately to reach children who have been trapped within the giant structures. A sequel, Crashmo (Note: known as Fallblox in Europe and Australia, and as Hikuotsu in Japan), was released for the Nintendo 3DS in 2012. A third game, Pushmo World (Note: known in Europe and Australia as Pullblox World and in Japan as Hikuosu World), was released for Wii U on June 19, 2014. A fourth game, Stretchmo (Note: known in Europe and Australia as Fullblox and in Japan as Hikudasu Hippaland), was released for Nintendo 3DS in May 2015.

All games in the series for Nintendo 3DS and Wii U are no longer available due to the Nintendo eShop closure for those systems.

== Plot and setting ==
Pushmo is set in Pushmo Park, where Pushmos are made by a man named Papa Blox. He is the creator and caretaker of the park. While visiting the park, Mallo witnesses Papa Blox hurting his back while trying to rescue a trapped child. Mallo assists, and they discover another child who is trapped inside. Mallo then crosses the park, rescuing the remaining children. Reaching the end of the park, Mallo confronts the child, who presents himself as Corin, a new child who wanted friends. The children forgive him, and they leave the park alongside Mallo. The next day, Papa Blox expands his park with new Pushmo.

== Gameplay ==
=== Basics ===
In the game, a Pushmo is a large, climbable playground structure made of blocks that can slide forwards and backwards. The player controls Mallo, a red, round sumo wrestling creature visiting Pushmo Park, home to dozens of Pushmo. In order to rescue the children, Mallo must move the sliding blocks of the Pushmo in such a way to create a path to reach the child.

Mallo can push and pull blocks a maximum of three steps forward, and can only do so while standing in front of the block or by standing to the side, provided Mallo has a platform on which to step while moving. If Mallo becomes stuck, the player can either reset the Pushmo or use a rewind feature similar to games such as Braid and Catrap. Also, difficult levels can be skipped and re-visited later, if desired. Later levels add manholes that allow Mallo to travel within the Pushmo to reach other parts of the structure.

=== Create and share ===
Along with the game's included 250-plus levels, Pushmo also includes the Pushmo Studio, where players can create and share their own Pushmo puzzles. In order to share puzzles, Pushmo generates a QR code that can be read by the 3DS' on-board cameras; the QR images can be posted on the Internet, printed or photographed from the 3DS's screen.

== Reception ==
Reception

Aggregate score
Aggregator	Score
Metacritic	90/100

Review scores
Publication	Score
1Up.com	A
Destructoid	8.5/10
Edge	8/10
Eurogamer	9/10
Game Informer	8.25/10
GameSpot	8.5/10
IGN	9.5/10
Nintendo Life	9/10
Nintendo World Report	9.5/10
Pocket Gamer	5/5
Metro	8/10

Pushmo received "universal acclaim" according to the review aggregation website Metacritic. Lucas M. Thomas of IGN called the game "a beautifully original, absolutely charming and oftentimes devious little portable puzzler", "the 3DS eShop's killer app", and "the best downloadable game Nintendo's ever offered in any format." Jeremy Parish of 1Up.com said Pushmo was "one of the 3DS's most outstanding offerings to date". Patrick Barnett of Nintendo World Report said the game was "an ingenious puzzler that will consume the free time of anyone who gives it a whirl."

Fourteen years after its release, it was named by Atari CEO Wade Rosen as his favourite game of 2025, describing it as a “beautiful non-dopamine loop gameplay that is just pure joy”.

== Legacy ==
=== Sequels ===
A sequel to Pushmo called Crashmo (known in the PAL region as Fallblox, and in Japan as Hikuotsu) was announced on October 4, 2012 by Nintendo in both North America and Europe. It was released in Japan on October 31, 2012, November 22, 2012 for the North American Nintendo eShop and November 15, 2012 for the European and Australian eShop. Using Mallo, players save birds rather than children and Mallo will be able to take on 140 new levels by pulling the blocks in any direction, causing some to fall. A third game, Pushmo World, known in Europe and Australia as Pullblox World and in Japan as Hikuosu World, was released for the Wii U in Japan, North America, Europe and Australia on June 19, 2014. A fourth game, Stretchmo, was released for the 3DS in Japan on May 12, 2015, and in Europe, Australia, and North America on May 14, 2015.

=== Appearances in other media ===
==== Super Smash Bros. series ====
In Super Smash Bros. for 3DS and Wii U, the main character, Mallo, appears as a collectable trophy. In Super Smash Bros. Ultimate, Mallo reappears as a Spirit and the “Welcome Center” music from Stretchmo is present.

==== Super Mario Maker ====
Mallo appears as a costume for Mario after beating the "100 Mario Challenge" in Super Expert difficulty.

==== WarioWare Gold ====
One of the "microgames" is taken from Pushmo in which the player controls Mallo and must reach the Flag Pole in three sets of challenges.
