= 3D Classics =

Label applied to certain updates of old games for the Nintendo 3DS

3D Classics (Note: Japanese: 3Dクラシックス, Hepburn: Surīdī Kurashikkusu) is a series of emulated classic video games developed by Arika and published by Nintendo for the Nintendo 3DS. They have been enhanced with stereoscopic 3D functionality and additional features while largely retaining their original art style and graphics.

== Development ==
The 3D Classics releases were directed by Takao Nakano, a member of Nintendo's Special-Planning & Development Department. Development on the lineup began in 2009, starting with Namco Bandai Games' Xevious. The development team underestimated the amount of work required to add stereoscopic 3D to a 2D game, requiring much more work than a simple port. Arika attempted a 3D Classics version of the NES/Famicom game Tennis because the background had perspective, but found it looked unimpressive in 3D while requiring re-coding collision detection almost from scratch.

== Release ==
During the reveal of the Nintendo 3DS at E3 2010, a non-playable demo titled 3D Classics Collection was shown to attendees, showing video of several NES and Super NES games being emulated in stereoscopic 3D. A total of 18 games were demonstrated, including Super Mario World, Mega Man 2, and Castlevania, with Nintendo of America president Reggie Fils-Aimé stating these games were planned for future release.

The first entry in the 3D Classics line, 3D Classics: Excitebike, was announced at Nintendo's fiscal year 2010 investor's meeting in April 2011. The meeting also confirmed that it would be available at the launch of the Nintendo eShop, and would be free to download for the first month before becoming a paid purchase. The game launched alongside the eShop in all regions on June 7, 2011, and remained free to download until July 7 in Western territories and July 31 in Japan.

3D Classics: Kid Icarus was initially available via promotions in each region, before later becoming available as a paid purchase. In Japan, it was available for free to users who registered any two Nintendo 3DS titles on Club Nintendo between October 1, 2011, and January 15, 2012; it became available to download starting December 19, 2011, ahead of the paid public release. In North America, select stores offered it as a pre-order bonus for Kid Icarus: Uprising; it was made available for these players alongside Uprising's release on March 23, 2012, ahead of the paid public release of the 3D Classics title. In Europe, it was available early for free to users who registered two of a selection of Nintendo 3DS titles on Club Nintendo between November 1, 2011, and January 31, 2012; it became available to download starting January 5, 2012. In Australia, it was available early for free to users who registered two of a selection of Nintendo 3DS titles on Club Nintendo between November 1, 2011, and March 31, 2012; download codes were emailed starting January 17, 2012.

=== List of games ===
A total of six 3D Classics games were published by Nintendo, all released within the first year of the eShop's availability.

Title	Original release	Japan	North America	Europe	Australia
Excitebike	1984	June 7, 2011	June 6, 2011	June 7, 2011	June 7, 2011
Kid Icarus	1986	January 18, 2012 (Note: Available early for free via a promotion starting December 19, 2011.)	April 19, 2012 (Note: Available early for free via a promotion starting March 23, 2012.)	February 2, 2012 (Note: Available early for free via a promotion starting January 5, 2012.)	April 12, 2012 (Note: Available early for free via a promotion starting January 17, 2012.)
Kirby's Adventure	1993	April 25, 2012	November 17, 2011	November 17, 2011	November 17, 2011
TwinBee	1985	August 10, 2011	September 22, 2011	September 22, 2011	September 22, 2011
Urban Champion	1984	July 13, 2011	August 18, 2011	August 18, 2011	August 18, 2011
Xevious	1983	June 7, 2011	July 21, 2011	July 21, 2011	July 21, 2011

== Reception ==
Modojo's Chris Buffa criticized the 3D Classics line for being remakes of uninteresting games, commenting that the line should focus on major titles such as Super Mario Bros., Donkey Kong, The Legend of Zelda, and Metroid.

== See also ==
- Sega 3D Reprint Archives
- List of Virtual Console games for Nintendo 3DS
- Virtual Console
