= Donkey Kong Country: Tropical Freeze =

2014 video game

- North American cover art
- Developer: Retro Studios (Note: Monster Games co-developed the Wii U version.)
- Publisher: Nintendo
- Directors: Ryan Harris; Vince Joly
- Producer: Kensuke Tanabe
- Designer: Stephen Dupree
- Programmer: Aaron Walker
- Artists: Ryan Powell; Will Bate
- Composer: David Wise (Note: Additional music by Kenji Yamamoto, Daisuke Matsuoka, Minako Hamano, Shinji Ushiroda and Riyu Tamura)
- Series: Donkey Kong
- Platforms: Wii U Nintendo Switch
- Release: Wii U: JP: February 13, 2014; NA/EU: February 21, 2014; AU: February 22, 2014; Nintendo Switch: JP: May 3, 2018; WW: May 4, 2018
- Genre: Platform
- Modes: Single-player, multiplayer

Donkey Kong Country: Tropical Freeze is a 2014 platform game developed by Retro Studios and published by Nintendo for the Wii U. The fifth installment in the Donkey Kong Country series, Tropical Freeze is a direct sequel to the 2010 Wii game Donkey Kong Country Returns and was released in February 2014. An enhanced port for the Nintendo Switch was released in May 2018.

In Tropical Freeze, Donkey Kong and his family must venture across five islands to save their home, Donkey Kong Island, after it is frozen over by the villainous Snowmads—a group of invaders from the northern seas, who attacked the island on Donkey Kong's birthday. Like its predecessor, the game received positive reviews for its level design, gameplay, and soundtrack, although its high difficulty received mixed opinions.

== Gameplay ==
Player one controls Donkey Kong, while the second player controls Diddy Kong, Dixie Kong or Cranky Kong in a standard level.

The game continues on from the side-scrolling platform gameplay of the Donkey Kong Country series and sees Donkey Kong and his friends traveling through seven different islands in order to defeat the Snowmads. Controls are similar to the previous game, with the addition of being able to pluck items from the ground and pick up and throw stunned enemies, and various controllers can be used with customizable controls. Like the previous game, players primarily control Donkey Kong who is assisted by a companion, who either provide additional abilities to Donkey Kong, or can be controlled individually by a second player. Along with Diddy Kong, who returns with his barrel jet pack for crossing large gaps, two additional characters are added: Dixie Kong and Cranky Kong. Dixie has the ability to spin her ponytail into a propeller and slowly descend through the air, with an initial boost in height at the start, allowing her and Donkey Kong to fly up to out-of-reach platforms or items. Cranky can use his walking stick to bounce on dangerous surfaces such as spiky thorns and reach higher areas and defeat certain enemies the other Kongs cannot. Filling up a 'Kong-POW' meter allows Donkey Kong and his partner to perform a special move which defeats all on-screen enemies and converts them into items depending on the partner.

The Super Guide from the previous game is absent and is replaced by an expanded shop, run by Funky Kong, offering various support items such as temporary invincibility. Like the previous game, each level contains various Kong letters and puzzle pieces, some of which require specific partners to reach, which unlock various bonuses and hidden levels. The Time Attack mode also returns, now featuring online leaderboards, allowing players to view video replays of the top ranked players.

The Nintendo Switch version of the game features Funky Kong as a new playable character. In the optional easier new Funky Mode, Funky Kong is playable with no possible companions, along with an option to switch between him and Donkey Kong. Unlike Donkey Kong in the game's normal mode, Funky Kong comes with five hit points instead of two, while he is also able to double-jump, hover in mid-air, stand on spikes and breathe underwater for an unlimited time. When Donkey Kong is played, he can gain a companion and each Kong has three hit points.

== Plot ==
As the Kongs celebrate Donkey Kong's birthday, their island is attacked by the Snowmads, arctic invaders. Their leader, Lord Fredrik, blows a horn that creates frozen winds and an ice dragon. The Kongs are blown away and the Snowmads seize the frozen Donkey Kong Island.

The Kongs traverse a series of islands and make their way back to Donkey Kong Island. They make their way through the frozen fortress until they encounter the leader of the Snowmads, Lord Fredrik, who challenges them to a battle deep in the depths of the volcano. Donkey Kong delivers the final punch to Lord Fredrik, who crashes into the Snowmad ships, defeating the Snowmads. Donkey Kong blows into Lord Fredrik's horn, producing a breeze that restores Donkey Kong Island to the tropical paradise that it is.

=== Characters ===
The game's story focuses on the Snowmads, a group of Viking-themed arctic animals such as walruses, owls, Rabbits, and penguins that invade Donkey Kong Island, forcing Donkey Kong (Takashi Nagasako) to go against them with the help of his friends Diddy Kong (Katsumi Suzuki), Dixie Kong (Kahoru Sasajima), and Cranky Kong (Nagasako). This is Dixie's third appearance in the main series and the first since Donkey Kong Country 3: Dixie Kong's Double Trouble!, released in 1996. This is also Cranky's first appearance as a main playable character in the Donkey Kong Country series, although he was previously playable in minigames in the Game Boy Advance versions of Donkey Kong Country 2 and 3 and 1984's Donkey Kong Hockey (when he went by the name of Donkey Kong).

== Development and release ==
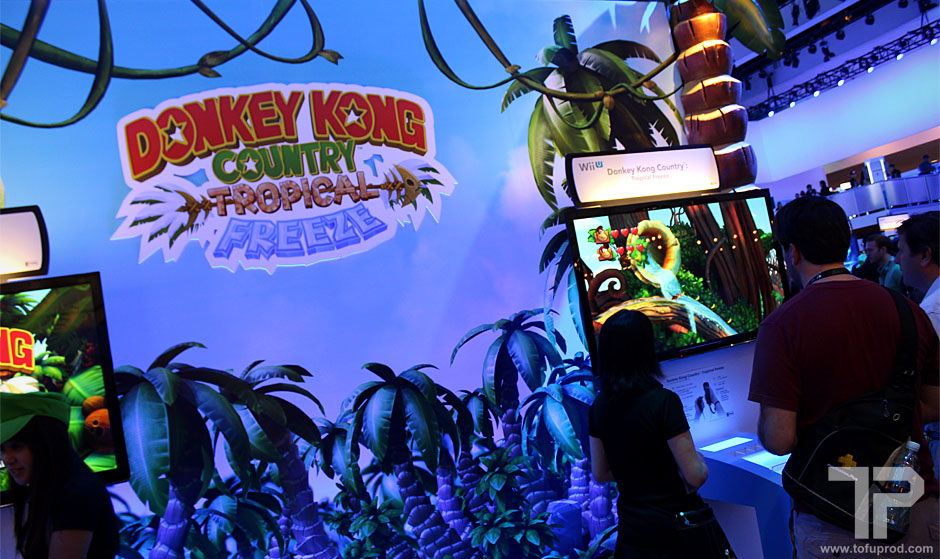
Playable demo booths for Donkey Kong Country: Tropical Freeze at E3 2013

The game was announced during Nintendo's E3 2013 Nintendo Direct presentation on June 11, and was produced by Kensuke Tanabe who, having previously worked on Super Mario Bros. 2, has incorporated some elements from that game.

Originally to be released in November 2013, Nintendo pushed back the release date to December 6 to avoid competition with Super Mario 3D World, and in October 2013, they settled a February 21, 2014, release date, citing the need for more time to optimize the game.

The soundtrack was primarily composed by David Wise, along with the help of Aiden Griffin as his assistant. Wise previously contributed music for the original SNES Donkey Kong Country games. Additional music was provided by Daisuke Matsuoka, Minako Hamano, Shinji Ushiroda, and Riyu Tamura under the supervision of Kenji Yamamoto.

The development team designed the gameplay to be similar to that of previous series games, apart from a few new features. Retro Studios president Michael Kelbaugh told Nintendo of America president Reggie Fils-Aimé that production started on Tropical Freeze because the team "had a lot of gas left in the tank" after finishing Returns, wanting to include underwater levels and 3D camera work, and to use the Wii U hardware to do "a lot of really new cool tricks". The addition of camera work was the team's biggest change. The dynamic camera swings from a side to a fully 3D view, bringing depth to obstacles in the characters' path. Additionally, Tropical Freeze adds Dixie Kong as a partner character, who has a mid-air hover ability that affects how players access platforms. The developers also added "plucking" objects out of the ground, similar to the game mechanic in Super Mario Bros. 2, on which Tropical Freeze's producer had also worked. Due to Donkey Kong series creator Shigeru Miyamoto being protective over the series, Retro Studios had to prove their ability to handle the license. Miyamoto influenced the game's "ground pound" design and gave other small tips, but was otherwise not involved in its development. Michael Kelbaugh of Retro Studios had worked on Donkey Kong Country series games in various capacities since the first release.

An enhanced port for the Nintendo Switch was released on May 4, 2018. It was developed once again by Retro Studios and includes support for new control schemes and an easier difficulty option, "Funky Mode", which introduces Funky Kong as a playable character.

== Reception ==
Donkey Kong Country: Tropical Freeze

Aggregate scores
Aggregator	Score	
Aggregator	NS	Wii U
Metacritic	86/100	83/100
OpenCritic	87% recommend (Note: Based on 138 reviews)	N/A

Review scores
Publication	Score	
Publication	NS	Wii U
4Players	90/100	90/100
Destructoid	N/A	10/10
Easy Allies	9.5/10	N/A
Edge	N/A	7/10
Electronic Gaming Monthly	4/5	9.5/10
Eurogamer	Recommended	7/10
Famitsu	N/A	9/10, 8/10, 9/10, 9/10
Game Informer	9.25/10	9.25/10
GameRevolution	N/A	4.5/5
GameSpot	9/10	6/10
GamesRadar+	4.5/5	4/5
GamesTM	N/A	7/10
GameTrailers	N/A	9.1/10
Hardcore Gamer	4/5	N/A
Hyper	N/A	70/100
IGN	9/10	9/10
Jeuxvideo.com	16/20	N/A
Joystiq	N/A	4/5
Nintendo Life	9/10	9/10
Nintendo World Report	9/10	9.5/10
Official Nintendo Magazine	N/A	86%
Pocket Gamer	4.5/5	N/A
Polygon	N/A	8.5/10
Shacknews	7/10	6/10
The Guardian	N/A	4/5
USgamer	N/A	4.5/5
VentureBeat	89/100	70/100
VideoGamer.com	N/A	8/10

Like its predecessor, Donkey Kong Country: Tropical Freeze received "generally favorable reviews" from critics.

Destructoid gave the game a perfect 10 out of 10. GamesRadar gave the game 4 out of 5 stars, praising its presentation and challenge whilst criticising the co-operative multiplayer. Game Informer gave it a 9.25 out of 10 for the levels, gameplay and graphics, while also noting the game having fewer levels than Returns. GameTrailers gave the game a 9.1 out of 10, praising enhancements made to the gameplay, and the "stellar" soundtrack. IGN gave the game 9 out of 10 for the game's challenge, level design, and boss battles.

GameSpot, however, gave the game 6 out of 10, saying that interesting boss battles and vehicle segments did not make up for "clunky, repetitive level design" and poor implementation of new mechanics. GamesTM, who gave it a 7 out of 10, found the game to be as difficult as its predecessors, citing the enemy and obstacle placements, and the difficulty of boss battles.

In their review of the Nintendo Switch version, GameSpot gave Tropical Freeze a more favorable assessment, awarding the game 9 out of 10. IGN stood by their 9 out of 10 score, remarking that the addition of Funky Mode makes the game more accessible without reducing the formidable platforming difficulty.

The game was nominated for Best Visual Design and Best Audio at the 2014 Golden Joystick Awards, as well as for Best Nintendo Game at the 2018 event.

=== Sales ===
In Japan, the Wii U version of Donkey Kong: Tropical Freeze sold over 70,000 copies during its first month of release. During its first eight days of release in the United States, the game sold an estimated 130,000 units. This game, along with its predecessor, were added to the Nintendo Selects label in March 2016, in North America. According to the 2021 CESA Games White Papers, it went on to sell 2.02 million units on the Wii U, as of December 2020.

The Nintendo Switch version of Tropical Freeze had stronger sales. In Japan alone, the game sold roughly 88,421 units in the first five days of release, more than doubling its debut on Wii U. By December 2018, the game had sold 2.08 million copies worldwide on the Switch, bringing total sales to over 4 million units across both platforms. As of March 2019, the title has sold over 2.25 million units worldwide on the Switch, including 290,000 copies in Japan. The 2023 CESA Games White Papers revealed that the Nintendo Switch version had sold 4.62 million units, as of December 2022.
