= Photo Dojo =

2009 video game

- Developer: Nintendo SPD
- Publisher: Nintendo
- Composers: Koichi Kyuma; Asuka Ito
- Platform: Nintendo DSi
- Release: JP: December 16, 2009; PAL: March 19, 2010; NA: May 10, 2010
- Genre: Fighting
- Modes: Single-player, multiplayer

Photo Dojo (Note: Known in Japan as Shashin de Kakutō! Photo Fighter X (Japanese: 写真で格闘！フォトファイターX)) is a fighting video game developed and published by Nintendo for the Nintendo DSi's DSiWare service. 200 DSi Points were required to download Photo Dojo in the DSi Shop before it was shut down. In North America, the game was free to download until June 11, 2010.

== Gameplay ==
Before players can play the game, a fighter has to be made. This is accomplished by taking 13 pictures of the person, including a profile picture, attack poses, a taunt, and others. One of the pictures involves taking a picture of an object to be a fire ball or another kind of projectile. If a person is taking pictures of themselves, they must set the DSi up by itself on a flat surface and pose for the photos from a distance for certain photos using the inner camera. If the pictures are being taken by another person, the pictures are taken by the outside camera. Once the pictures have all been taken, players must make 10 audio recordings for certain poses. Afterward, players must enter their names and their fighting style. After completing a character, a background image must be taken using the outside camera for the fighters to fight on. Once these are all set up, players can then either choose to play vs. mode or single-player mode.

In vs. mode, two players fight against each other, one using the d-pad and the L trigger, the other using the face buttons and the R trigger. In single-player mode, the player takes on 100 weaker fighters in waves. Each character has three special attacks - an energy ball, a special attack, and a desperation attack. The special and desperation attacks vary based on the character's fighting style. A player can taunt by touching the touch screen button "Taunt your enemy". This does not do any damage or healing but just plays a recorded sound. When a player is low on health, the icon is replaced with "Desperation Move". The desperation attack is very powerful, but can only be used once.

If the player can defeat 100 enemies in single-player mode, then the credits will roll featuring the main player walking across the background, while listening to the fighter's following recorded sounds: punch, kick, taunt, and Desperation Move, and then all the fighters' starting sounds. Afterwards, a score and grade are given based the time it took to defeat 100 enemies and remaining health and a bonus track is unlocked.

== Reception ==
Since its release, Photo Dojo has received mixed reviews. It holds an aggregate score of 72/100 and 73.20% at Metacritic and GameRankings respectively. IGN praised it as being a "wonderfully simple, engaging, and absolutely hilarious experience", though bemoaning the fact that players cannot share their creations. Despite complaints over the lack of Wireless Play in multiplayer, Wiiloveit.com thought the game contained "rich possibilities for ... hilarity" amongst family and friends. Official Nintendo Magazine UK described it as "daft, clever, simple and cheap", adding that they want to see more DSiWare titles that are like that. Nintendo Life described its versatility and use of the DSi's functions as being superb, and all of its features are enough for them to forgive the lack of gameplay modes and simplicity. NGamer was less thrilled with the product, describing it as being a throwaway title, though a funny one. Vandal Online stated that while it may be enjoyable for some, it should not be purchased for the fighting game portion.
