= ThruSpace =

2010 WiiWare game

- Developer: Keys Factory
- Publisher: Nintendo
- Composers: Masaru Tajima; Shinji Ushiroda
- Platform: Wii
- Release: JP: September 7, 2010; NA: October 18, 2010; PAL: November 5, 2010
- Genre: Puzzle
- Mode: Single-player

ThruSpace, known in Europe as ThruSpace: High Velocity 3D Puzzle and in Japan as Surinuke Anatōsu (すりぬけアナトウス), is a 2010 puzzle video game developed by Japanese studio Keys Factory and published by Nintendo for the Wii. It was released on the WiiWare service. Players play as a block known as a "Keydron", and use the Wii Remote to rotate the Keydron so it will fit in gaps in walls that approach it.

== Gameplay ==
Playing as a Keydron, players must rotate the Wii Remote to rotate the Keydron so it will fit in gaps that approach the player. There are multiple difficulty levels, each one changing Keydron to become more complex shapes. Occasionally, crystals appear in gaps in the wall, which will give the player bonus points when collected. Players play for a high score.

== Reception ==
Reception

Aggregate score
Aggregator	Score
Metacritic	73/100

Review scores
Publication	Score
Eurogamer	8/10
GamesMaster	70%
NGamer	60%
Nintendo Life	7/10
Official Nintendo Magazine	75%

ThruSpace received "mixed or average reviews" according to the review aggregation website Metacritic. Eurogamer's Kristan Reed called the game "relatively simple", but still praised the game's difficulty.

== Sequel ==
ThruSpace received a sequel on the Nintendo 3DS, called Ketzal's Corridors. It follows the same gameplay loop of ThruSpace, but with a more distinct art style.
