= Ketzal's Corridors =

2011 video game

- Developer: KeysFactory
- Publisher: Nintendo
- Composer: Masaru Tajima
- Platform: Nintendo 3DS
- Release: JP: October 21, 2011; PAL: April 5, 2012; NA: April 12, 2012
- Genre: Puzzle
- Modes: Single-player, multiplayer

Ketzal's Corridors, known in PAL regions as SpeedThru: Potzol's Puzzle and in Japan as Shissō Surinuke Anatōsu (疾走すりぬけ アナトウス), is a puzzle video game developed by KeysFactory and published by Nintendo for the Nintendo 3DS. It was released on the Nintendo eShop. The game is a follow-up to KeysFactory's ThruSpace, released on WiiWare in 2010.

== Gameplay ==
The game is described as a "third-person on-rails Tetris", with the player having to move a 3-4 block shape, attempting to get through each hole without missing, and using a variety of strategic movements to the block to progress efficiently through the level. The setting of the game is based on the Aztec, the ethnic groups of central Mexico that lived during the 14th–16th centuries.

== Reception ==
Reception

Aggregate score
Aggregator	Score
Metacritic	76/100

Review scores
Publication	Score
Edge	7/10
GamesMaster	64%
IGN	9/10
NGamer	64%
Nintendo Life	8/10
Nintendo World Report	7.5/10
Official Nintendo Magazine	83%
Pocket Gamer	4/5

The game received "generally favorable reviews" according to the review aggregation website Metacritic. IGN called it "brilliant and highly addictive". Official Nintendo Magazine called it "excellent". Edge found it fun in short bursts but warned that extended play could cause eye strain.
