= Sakura Samurai: Art of the Sword =

2011 video game

Sakura Samurai: Art of the Sword Hana Samurai: Art of the Sword
- Cover art
- Developer: Grounding Inc.
- Publisher: Nintendo
- Director: Noboru Hotta
- Producers: Mineko Okamura; Kensuke Tanabe
- Designers: Yasunari Hiroyama; Yukio Futatsugi; Noburu Hotta; Masao Suganuma
- Programmer: Kyosei Yukimoto
- Artist: Keita Watanabe
- Composers: Kenji Yamamoto; Toshiyuki Sudo; Daisuke Matsuoka
- Platform: Nintendo 3DS
- Release: JP: November 16, 2011; NA: February 2, 2012; PAL: October 11, 2012
- Genre: Action-adventure
- Mode: Single player

Sakura Samurai: Art of the Sword is an action-adventure game developed by Grounding Inc. and published by Nintendo for the Nintendo 3DS's eShop. The game was released in Japan on November 16, 2011 as Hirari Sakura Samurai (ひらり 桜侍), in North America on February 2, 2012, and in PAL regions on October 11, 2012 under the title Hana Samurai: Art of the Sword.

== Plot ==
A young, nameless samurai hero sometimes referred to as "Sakura Samurai", trained by an old kappa and dubbed as the Sakura Samurai (or Hana Samurai), travels the game's world to rescue a kidnapped princess called Cherry Blossom, a daughter of the cherry blossom god in the Land of the Rising Sun.

== Reception ==
Audrey Drake of IGN gave the game a 9/10 for its distinct charm, art style, and fulfilling gameplay. Vaughn Highfield of Pocket Gamer gave the game an 8.0/10.

Nintendo Life gave the game an 8.0/10 saying that Sakura Samurai: Art of the Sword may not be the prettiest game on the eShop but it sure is one of the most challenging, striking a good balance between difficulty and precision.

== Other media ==
The character Sakura Samurai appears as a trophy exclusively in the 3DS version of Super Smash Bros. for Nintendo 3DS and Wii U. He also appears in Super Smash Bros. Ultimate as a collectible Spirit. A remix of the first boss battle theme also appears in the Wii U version of for Nintendo 3DS and Wii U, as a selectable song for the stage Luigi's Mansion, and it returns in Ultimate, where it can be played on any miscellaneous Nintendo series stage.
