= Trade & Battle: Card Hero =

2000 video game

- Developers: Nintendo R&D1; Intelligent Systems
- Publisher: Nintendo
- Director: Yoshio Sakamoto
- Producers: Takehiro Izushi; Takashi Kawaguchi
- Designer: Yoshio Sakamoto
- Programmer: Kenji Imai
- Artists: Hiroshi Tanigawa; Yumiko Morisada
- Writer: Yoshio Sakamoto
- Composer: Takane Ōkubo
- Platform: Game Boy Color
- Release: JP: February 21, 2000
- Genre: Role-playing
- Modes: Single-player, multiplayer

Trade & Battle: Card Hero (Note: Japanese: トレード&バトル カードヒーロー, Hepburn: Torēdo & Batoru Kādo Hīrō) is a card battle role-playing game developed by Nintendo and Intelligent Systems and published by Nintendo for the Game Boy Color. It was released in Japan on February 21, 2000. A sequel, Kousoku Card Battle: Card Hero, was released in 2007.

== Plot ==
In this game, the player plays as Hiroshi, a blue-haired boy living in a town where the game Card Hero has become very popular. He wishes to become a master of the game by collecting different kinds of cards and dueling with various opponents. His goal becomes harder to achieve when a malicious group, The Jokers, causes trouble in town.

== Gameplay ==
The main objective of the Card Hero series is to defeat the opponent's Master card. To do so, players hold Stones that are used to play cards and four Monster card slots (two in the front row and two in the back). The player attacks the opponent's Master to drain the opponent's HP to 0 and win the game. However, the Master has a shield of 2HP, which is usually the maximum strength of most Monster cards' attacks. Therefore, the player can only damage the opponent if the strength of an attack is 3 or higher, and the damage would then be reduced by 2.

Despite the fact that most Monsters are unable to damage the Master initially, there are several ways to increase its strength so that it can. One way is to have the Monster card not move for one turn. On the next turn, it will become charged. This causes the strength of the Monster's charge attack to increase by 1. The player also can use items on the Monster, such as Power-up. The preferred way to strengthen a Monster is by increasing its level, which can be done by defeating another Monster.

There are three different rule sets in this game: Junior, Senior, and Pro, which affect the number of cards in the player's deck and the master cards. The Junior game is very basic; players use decks of 20 cards (15 in the Game Boy Color game) and normal Masters with 5HP. The Senior game is basically the same, but with the addition of Magic Master cards. The Pro rule set uses 30 cards and Magic Masters with 10HP.

=== Types of Cards ===
The player and the opponent both have one MasterCard. The object of the game is to defeat the opponent's Master before it defeats the player's. All Master cards have a shield that reduces damage done to them by 2HP. There also are Magic Masters, which have special abilities. Among Magic Masters are the White Master, the Black Master, and the Wonder Master.

Monster Cards are essential to Card Hero. Monsters are used to defend the Master as well as attack the opponent's. However, most Monsters begin with an attack strength of 1 or 2, which is incapable of damaging the enemy Master.

To play a Monster Card, the player must lend it 1 Stone. It is then placed in an empty Monster card slot, face-down in Preparation mode. When the card is like this, it cannot be attacked and it cannot move. On the next turn, it is flipped over. Monsters can increase their power by leveling up from defeating another monster. In order to do this, however, the player must give it another Stone. Monsters can only level up to a certain level. For example, while Rouge can level up to L3, Manatot can level up only to L2. Some Monsters may not be able to level up at all. As a reversal rule, when a Monster card is defeated, its owner is returned all of the Stones that were lent to it.

Monster cards all have a Charge attack, and some have in addition a Magic attack. The Charge attack can damage adjacent cards. If a Monster does not move for an entire turn, it becomes charged and the power of the Charge attack increases by 1. Magic attacks can have various effects and usually cost Stones to be used. Some effects include attacking other cards from a range, having strength capable of damaging the opponent's Master, and recovering HP.

There are four Monster Card slots, two in the front row and two in the back row. The Monster Card usually tells whether the Monster is suited best for the Back Row or the Front Row. The Front Row is best for cards with high HP which can attack adjacently with powerful strength, such as Takokey. The typical Front Type Monster has about 5HP and a Charge attack dealing 2HP damage. The Back Row is best for monsters with low HP and a strong far-range Magic attack. The typical Back Type Monster has around 2~3HP and a Magic attack with strength of 2HP damage. When a Monster in the Front Row is defeated and another Monster is behind them, the Monster in the back row moves up automatically to the Front Row. Monsters can move to different slots and switch positions with other Monster cards, but they cannot attack in the same turn.

Super Monster Cards are powerful cards that are difficult to get into play, but can easily decide who wins the game. A Super Monster can be played atop the Monster from which it "evolves" when it exceeds its maximum level. An example of a Super Monster is Elgoma, the Super form of Poligoma.

Magic Cards will execute a special effect at the cost of a certain number of Stones. The cost and effects vary from card to card. A few examples of the effects of Magic Cards include recovering HP, damaging the opponent's cards, and increasing the stats of the player's cards.

The player who goes first is determined by a game of Rock Paper Scissors. The participants then shuffle their decks and draw five cards.

At the beginning of a player's turn, three Stones are always drawn along with one card. After that is done, the player may play any desired cards and command their Monster cards. All of their Monster cards can be commanded in the same turn, but a Monster can only be commanded once in a turn. The other player's turn then begins

== Development ==
Sakamoto spoke on the genesis of the title stating,

"Around four years ago... when people were talking about N64 and PlayStation. It was the era when graphics were being pushed to the forefront, and I thought that direction would be the mainstream from that point on, but then the Game Boy Pocket and Pokémon were released. Pokémon was a very innovative creation, and I was impressed by all the little touches used to make it feel like you were really collecting living creatures; at the same time, the Game Boy Pocket was not just smaller but had become a much more appealing accessory to want to carry around.

Around that same time, Magic: The Gathering became popular in our department, and as I listened to the stories of the people playing the game, I realized it'd make the excellent basis for a video game―the cards don't have much value in and of themselves, but they're extremely desirable to those who are into them, and I thought the way that people were imparting that personal value onto them was similar to the way people might regard certain items in video games.

Pokemon is a game that cultivates affection for such "items", Game Boy Pocket was a platform that could realize them, and MtG offered a game format, so I started to think combining and synthesizing elements from all three would make something really fun."

== Release and reception ==
Reception

Review score
| Publication | Score |
|---|---|
| Famitsu | 9/10, 9/10, 9/10, 8/10 |

Trade & Battle: Card Hero was released in Japan for the Game Boy Color on February 21, 2000. It was released digitally in Japan for the Nintendo 3DS's Virtual Console on August 10, 2011.

Four writers for the Japanese magazine Famitsu reviewed the game. All four of them found the game very addicting noting that it had excellent game balance, depth and that it was so easy to play, it did not even require a manual to understand. One reviewer said the game was good, it may make players rediscover the joy of gaming that may have been forgotten. While giving the game high scores, two of the reviewers commented that the visuals in the game were a bit plain.

== Legacy ==
The card dealer, Maruo Maruhige, appeared as a Trophy in the GameCube game, Super Smash Bros. Melee and in Super Smash Bros. Brawl, Hiroshi, Master, and Tameo appear as collectible stickers. Maruo also makes an appearance in Super Smash Bros. Ultimate, referred to as the "Maruhige Shop Owner", as one of the game's collectible Spirits.

A sequel titled Kousoku Card Battle: Card Hero was released in Japan for the Nintendo DS on December 20, 2007. Some monsters returned from the game's predecessor with altered looks, some returning monsters look completely different. The sequel also features new monsters, as well as new main characters: Satoru, Haruka and their rival, Kiriwo. Like Maruo, Satoru appears as a Spirit in Super Smash Bros. Ultimate.
