= Nitrobike =

2008 video game

- Developer: Left Field Productions
- Publisher: Ubisoft
- Programmer: David Anderson
- Platforms: Wii, PlayStation 2
- Release: Wii: NA: January 15, 2008; AU: February 7, 2008; EU: February 8, 2008; JP: March 27, 2008; PlayStation 2: NA: October 14, 2008; AU: 2008
- Genre: Racing
- Modes: Single-player, multiplayer

Nitrobike is a dirt-bike racing video game for the Wii and PlayStation 2. It is published by Ubisoft and was developed by Left Field Productions, the developer previously responsible for, among other games, Excitebike 64, MTX Mototrax and Dave Mirra BMX Challenge. It began development in October 2006, and was presented by Ubisoft at its E3 2007 press conference in Santa Monica, California. Initially exclusive as Wii title, it was the first Motocross game for the Wii.

== Gameplay ==
A gameplay screenshot of Nitrobike

Nitrobike features gameplay that is somewhat similar to its predecessors Excitebike 64 and Excite Truck. The controls in this game are similar to Excite Truck, with player holding the Wii Remote on its side and twisting the remote to the right or left in order to steer. The physics in the game, while still retaining some aspect of realism, have a very arcade-like feel. According to the CEO of Left Field Productions, James Higgins, the game will be about five times as fast as Excitebike 64, and players will be able to perform more impressive jumps than in the game's predecessors. Higgins also noted that by performing tricks while in the air, players will be able to boost longer, which in turn will allow them to finish tracks faster.

Nitrobike features online play allowing up to six players to race against each other simultaneously. Players can compete in random worldwide (divided to ntsc and pal) matches or exchange friend codes to play against friends. The game will keep record of the number of races friends have competed in and the number of first-place finishes.

== Reception ==
Reception

Aggregate score
| Aggregator | Score |
|---|---|
| Metacritic | 49/100 |

Review scores
| Publication | Score |
|---|---|
| 1Up.com | D+ |
| Eurogamer | 5/10 |
| Famitsu | 18/40 |
| Game Informer | 4.25/10 |
| GameSpot | 4/10 |
| GameTrailers | 4/10 |
| IGN | 6.5/10 |
| Nintendo Power | 3.5/10 |
| Official Nintendo Magazine | 30% |
| VideoGamer.com | 3/10 |
| Maxim | 3/5 |

The Wii version of Nitrobike received "generally unfavorable reviews" according to the review aggregation website Metacritic.

Nintendo Power said it was a "disappointing wreck of a Wii game". IGN claimed the Wii version had decent gameplay, but its presentation lacked "soul". GameSpot called it "a slow, clumsy mess". GameTrailers' sole praise for the same console version was for the unlockable "Crash Bowling" minigame, which, while "not particularly fun ... will keep [the player] from playing the main game". Famitsu gave it a score of two fours and two fives, for a total of 18 out of 40.

== See also ==
- Excitebike
- Excitebike 64
- Excite Truck
