= Dodge Viper =

Sports car produced by Dodge (1992–2017)

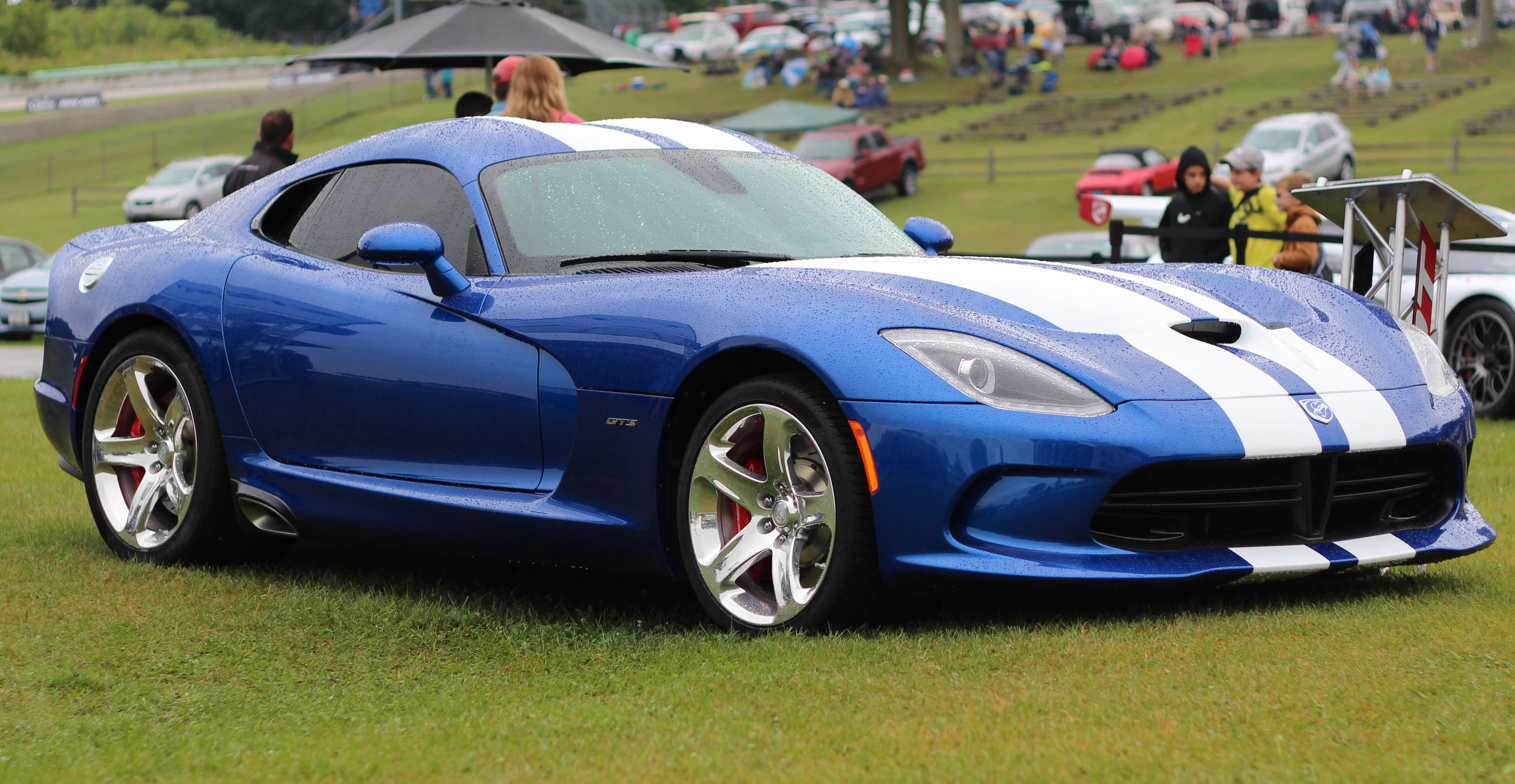
- 2013 SRT Viper GTS Launch Edition

Overview
- Manufacturer: Dodge (Note: Chrysler Corporation (1992–1998); DaimlerChrysler (1998–2009); Chrysler LLC (2008–2009); Chrysler Group LLC (2009–2010; 2013–2014); FCA US LLC (2014–2017))
- Production: 1991–2006; 2007–2017; Total 31,989 units
- Model years: 1992–2006; 2008–2017
- Assembly: Detroit, Michigan, United States: New Mack Assembly (1991–1995); Conner Avenue Assembly (1996–2017)

Body and chassis
- Class: Sports car (S)
- Body style: 2-door liftback coupe (1996–2017); 2-door convertible (1991–2010)
- Layout: Longitudinally-mounted, front mid-engine, rear-wheel drive

The Dodge Viper is an American sports car that was manufactured by Dodge (by SRT for 2013 and 2014), a division of American car manufacturer Chrysler. First showcased in 1989 at the North American International Auto Show as a interpretative concept car of a modern-era AC Cobra, production of the two-seat sports car later began at New Mack Assembly Plant in 1991 and moved to Conner Avenue Assembly Plant in October 1995. Five generations of the Viper were developed from 1991 until 2017, with a brief hiatus in 2007 and between 2011 and 2012.

Early in its production, the Viper gained a reputation for being an intimidating car to drive, producing high amounts of power and torque with no driver aids. Subsequent introductions of electronic assists and safety features allowed the car to become more accessible over time while simultaneously gaining performance, gradually moving upmarket into the supercar class. In 2014, the Viper was named number 10 on Cars.com's "American-Made Index" list, meaning 75% or more of its parts are manufactured in the United States. The Viper was discontinued in 2017 after approximately 32,000 were produced over 26 years of production.

== Development ==
The Viper was initially conceived in late 1988 at Chrysler's Advanced Design Studios. The following February, Chrysler president Bob Lutz suggested to Tom Gale at Chrysler Design Center that the company should consider producing a modern Cobra, and a clay model was presented to Lutz a few months later. Produced in sheet metal by Metalcrafters, the car appeared as a concept at the North American International Auto Show in 1989. Public reaction was so enthusiastic that chief engineer Roy Sjoberg was directed to develop it as a standard production vehicle. But then Chrysler chairman Lee Iacocca delayed approving the $70 million needed to put the sports car into production, saying it was a lot to spend without assurance of financial return.

Sjoberg selected 85 engineers to be "Team Viper", with development beginning in March 1989. The team asked the then-Chrysler subsidiary Lamborghini to cast a prototype aluminum block for the sports car to use in May. The production body was completed in Fall 1989, with a chassis prototype running in December. Though a V8 engine was first used in the test mule called White Mule, the V10 engine, which the production car was meant to use, was ready in February 1990. Official approval from Iacocca came in May 1990. By auto industry standards $70 million was not a lot of money but the potential in improved image was fantastic. One year later, Carroll Shelby piloted a pre-production car as the pace vehicle in the Indianapolis 500 race. In November 1991, the car was released to reviewers with the first retail shipments beginning in January 1992.

The powerful two-seater, which sold for $52,000, sparked immediate interest in the Dodge brand among enthusiasts and the automotive press. Lutz hoped it would raise the spirits of the designers and engineers who were discouraged by the homely, unpopular cars that they had been commanded to produce. The popularity of the Viper overshadowed the recent failure of Iacocca's pet car, the TC, which had cost five times as much to develop.

== First generation (SR I; 1992–1995) ==
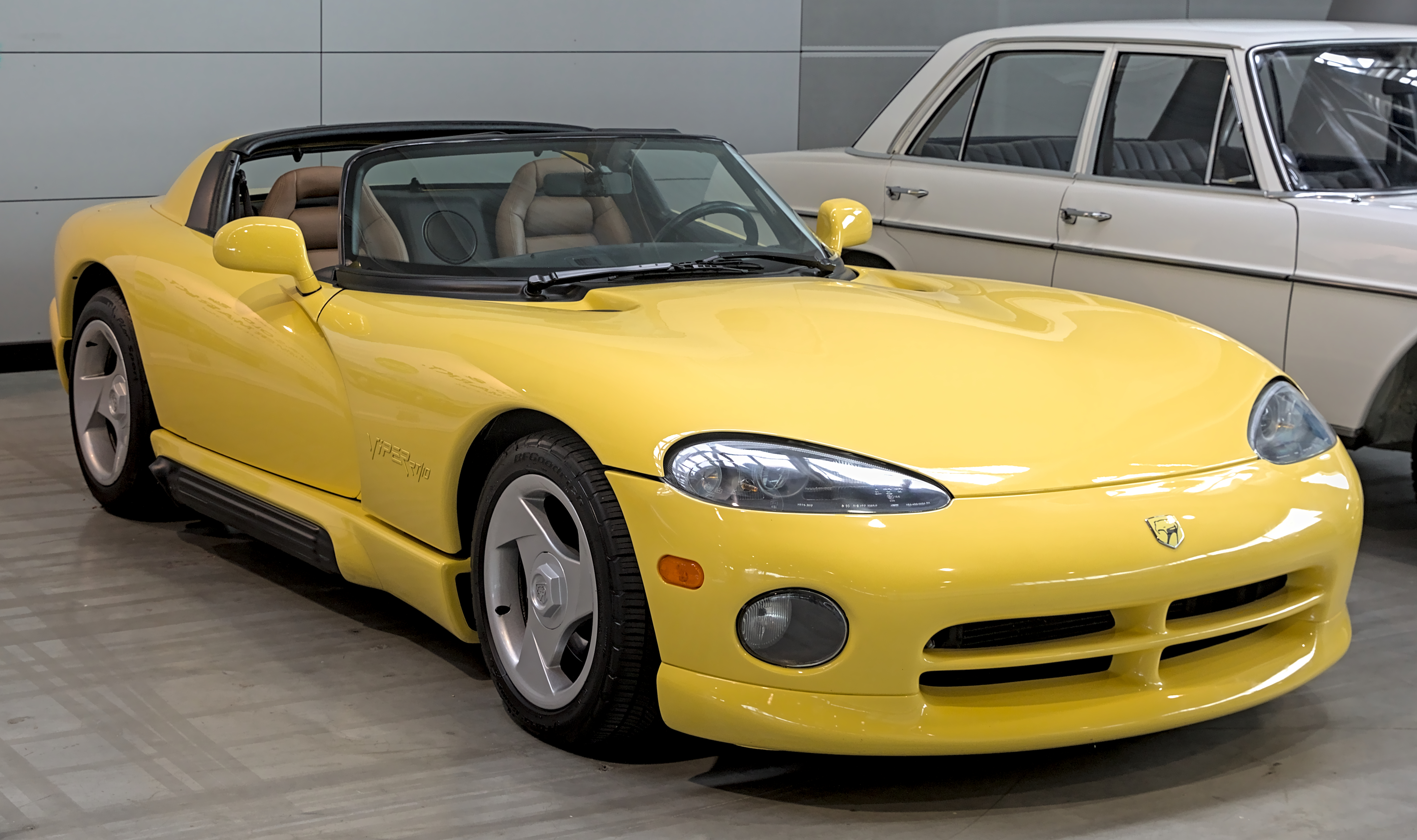
First generation Dodge Viper RT/10.

The first prototype was tested in January 1989. It debuted in 1991 with two pre-production models as the pace car for the Indianapolis 500 when Dodge was forced to substitute it in place of the Japanese-built Dodge Stealth, because of complaints from the United Auto Workers, and went on sale in January 1992 as the RT/10 Roadster. Lamborghini (then owned by Chrysler Corporation) helped with the design of the V10 engine for the Viper, which was based on the Chrysler's LA V8 engine. A major contributor to the Viper since the beginning was Dick Winkles, the chief power engineer, who had spent time in Italy overseeing the development of the engine.

Originally engineered to be a performance car, the Viper had no exterior-mounted door handles or key cylinders and no air conditioning (however, this was added as an option for the 1994-95 models, and climate controls featured a "snowflake" icon, which indicated a potential setting for the A/C). The roof was made from canvas, and the windows were made from vinyl using zippers to open and close, much like the Jeep Wrangler. However, the Viper was still equipped with some domestic features, including manually-adjustable leather-trimmed sport bucket seats with lumbar support, an AM/FM stereo cassette player with clock and high fidelity sound system, and interior carpeting. Aluminum alloy wheels were larger in diameter due to the larger brakes. A lightweight fiberglass hard roof option on later models was also available to cover the canvas soft roof, and was shipped with each new car. There were also no airbags, in the interest of weight reduction. Adjustable performance suspension was also an available option for most Vipers.

The engine weighs 323 kg (712 lb) and is rated at 400 hp (406 PS; 298 kW) at 4,600 rpm and 630 N⋅m (465 lb⋅ft) of torque at 3,600 rpm. Due to the long-gearing allowed by the engine, it provides fuel economy at a United States Environmental Protection Agency-rated 12 mpg_{‑US} (20 L/100 km; 14 mpg_{‑imp}) in the city and 20 mpg_{‑US} (12 L/100 km; 24 mpg_{‑imp}) on the highway. The body is a tubular steel frame with resin transfer molding (RTM) fiberglass panels. The car has a curb weight of 1,490 kg (3,280 lb) and lacks modern driver aids such as traction control and anti-lock brakes. The SR I can accelerate from 0–100 km/h (0–62 mph) in 4.2 seconds, 0–161 km/h (0–100 mph) in 9.2 seconds, can complete the quarter mile in 12.6 seconds at the speed of 183.1 km/h (113.8 mph) and has a maximum speed of approximately 266 km/h (165 mph). Its large tires allow the car to average close to one lateral g in corners. However, the car proves tricky to drive at high speeds, particularly for the unskilled driver.

== Second generation (SR II; 1996–2002) ==
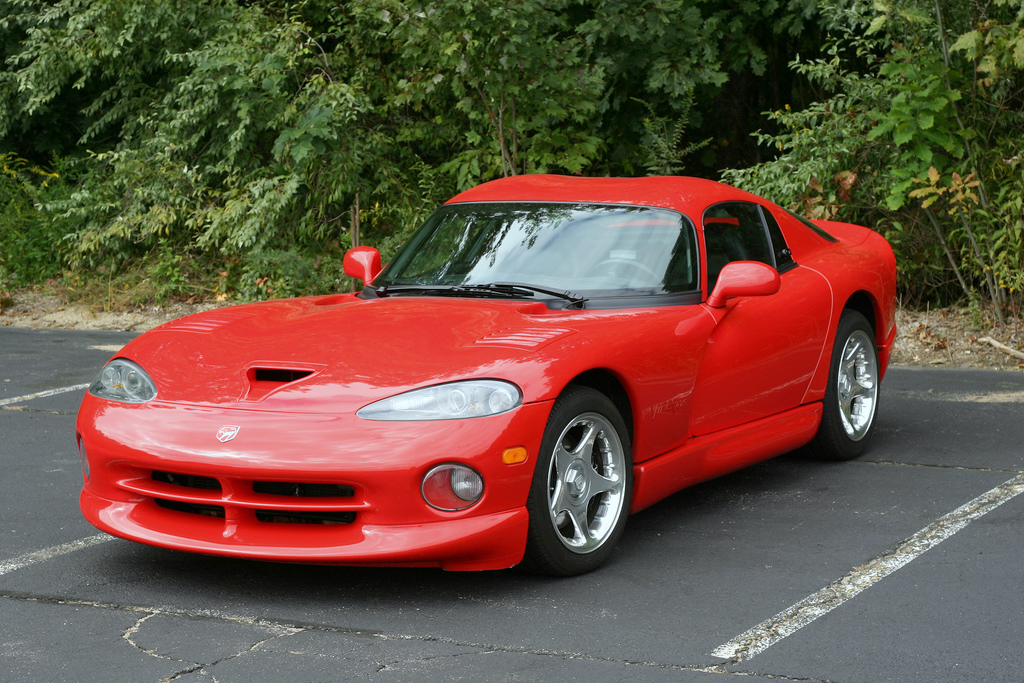
Second generation Dodge Viper GTS.

The second-iteration Viper, codenamed "SR II" was introduced in 1996. The exposed side exhaust pipes on the RT/10 roadster were relocated to a single muffler at the rear exiting via two large central tailpipes during the middle of the model year, which reduced back pressure, and therefore increased the power to 415 hp (309 kW; 421 PS). Torque would also increase by 23 lb⋅ft (31 N⋅m) to 488 lb⋅ft (662 N⋅m). A removable hardtop became available along with a sliding glass window. Some steel suspension components were replaced by aluminum, resulting in a 60 lb (27 kg) weight reduction.

Later in the 1996 model year, Dodge introduced the Viper GTS, a new coupé version of the Viper RT/10. Dubbed the “double bubble”, the roof featured slightly raised sections that looked like bubbles to accommodate the usage of helmets and taking design cues from the Shelby Daytona designed by Pete Brock. More than 90% of the GTS was new in comparison to the RT/10 despite similar looks. The GTS would come with the same 7,990 cc (8.0 L; 487.6 cu in) V10 engine but power would be increased to 450 hp (336 kW; 456 PS) at 5,200 rpm and 664 N⋅m (490 lb⋅ft) of torque at 3,700 rpm. The 1996 GTS would be the first Viper to be equipped with airbags and also included air conditioning, power windows and power door locks as standard equipment. The Viper GTS would be chosen as the pace car for the 1996 Indianapolis 500.

Minor updates would continue in 1997 and 1998. In 1997, the RT/10 would receive a power increase to 450 hp along with airbags and power windows. In 1998, both of the versions of the Viper were equipped with second-generation airbags, revised exhaust manifolds (saving 24 lb (11 kg) over the previous cast iron components) along with a revised camshaft.

In 2000, the engine was updated to use lighter hypereutectic pistons and the car received factory frame improvements. While the hypereutectic pistons provided less expansion, the forged pistons were preferred by customers for the supercharged and turbocharged aftermarket packages. TSB (Technical Service Bulletin) recalls (998 and 999) were done at local dealerships to repair the 1996 to 1999 Viper frames by adding gussets with rivets near the steering box. The 2001 models saw the addition of an anti-lock braking system.

The RT/10 was replaced by the SRT-10 roadster in 2003, and the GTS was replaced in 2006 by the SRT-10 coupe.

== Third generation (ZB I, 2003–2007) ==

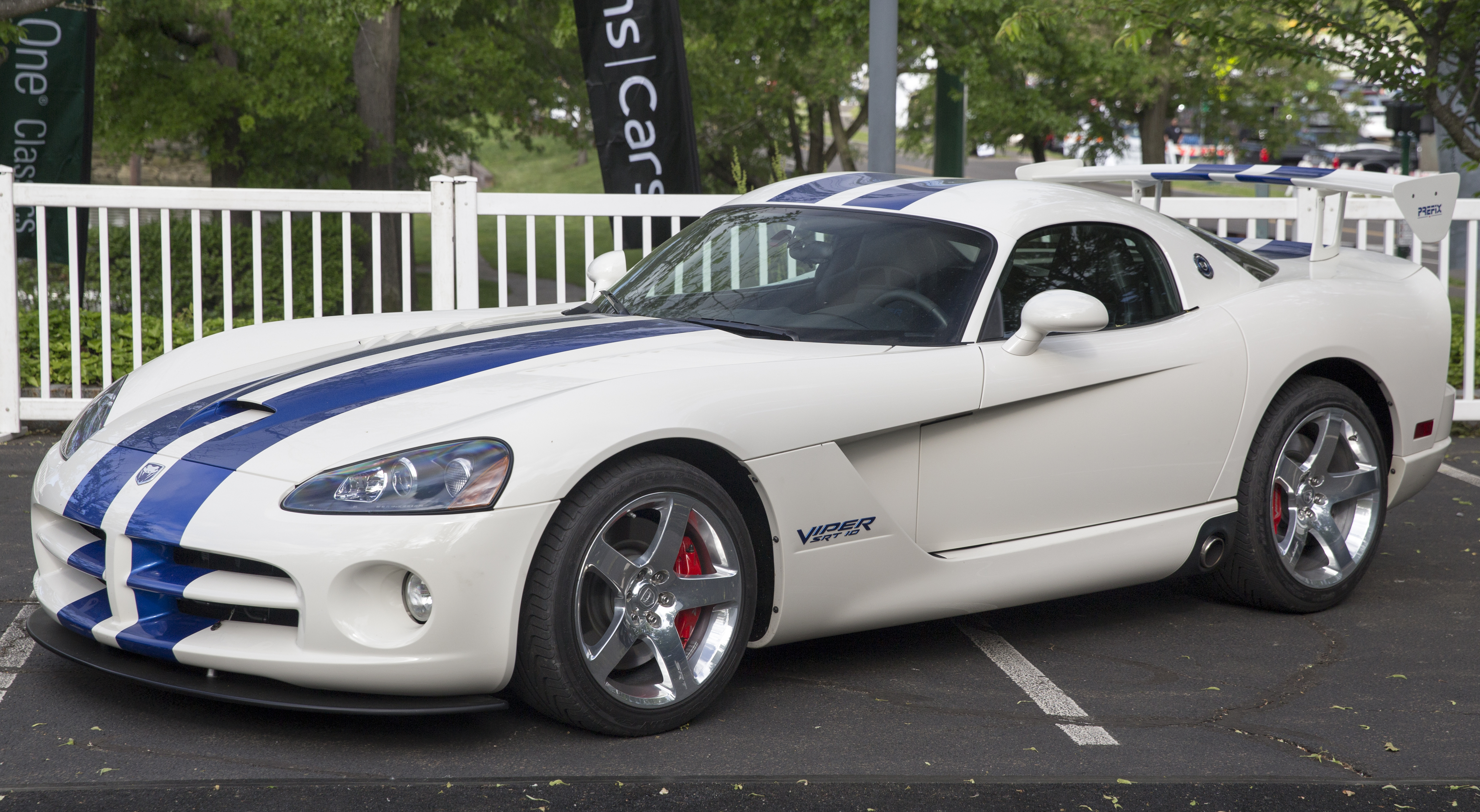
Third generation Viper SRT-10 coupe and roadster, designed by Osamu Shikado.

The Dodge Viper underwent a major redesign in 2002, courtesy of DaimlerChrysler's Street and Racing Technology group, taking cues from the Dodge Viper GTS-R concept presented in 2000. The new Viper SRT-10, which replaced both the GTS and the RT/10, was heavily restyled with sharp, angled bodywork. The engine's displacement was increased to 8.3 L; 505.6 cu in (8,285 cc), which, with other upgrades, increased the maximum power output to 500 hp (507 PS; 373 kW) at 5,600 rpm and 525 lb⋅ft (712 N⋅m) of torque at 4,200 rpm. Despite the power increase, the engine weight was reduced to about 500 lb (230 kg). The chassis was also improved, becoming more rigid and weighing approximately 80 lb (36 kg) less than the previous model.

An even lighter and stronger aluminum space frame chassis was in development for the next generation model, but the project was shelved because of parent company Chrysler's financial crisis. The stillborn project, created by Mercedes in the first place, was used as a basis by Daimler for the development of the Mercedes-Benz SLS AMG.

The initial model introduced was a convertible. In 2004, Dodge introduced a limited-edition Mamba package; Mamba-edition cars featured black interiors, with red stitching and trim, price increased by about $3,000. 200 cars with the Mamba package were produced.

The Viper SRT-10 Coupe was introduced at the 2005 Detroit Auto Show as a 2006 model. It shares many of its body panels with the convertible, but borrows its side and rear styling from the Competition Coupé concept. The coupé looks much like the previous Viper GTS and retains the "double-bubble" roof shape of the original along with the original GTS' tail lights, as well as retaining the original GTS Blue with white stripes paint scheme on the initial run of First Edition cars like the original Viper coupé. The engine is SAE-certified to be rated a maximum power output of 510 hp (517 PS; 380 kW) at 5,600 rpm and 535 lb⋅ft (725 N⋅m) of torque at 4,200 rpm. Unlike the original coupé, the chassis was not modified.

No cars were produced for the 2007 model year; instead, Chrysler extended production of the 2006 model while preparing the updated 2008 model.

== Fourth generation (ZB II; 2008–2010) ==
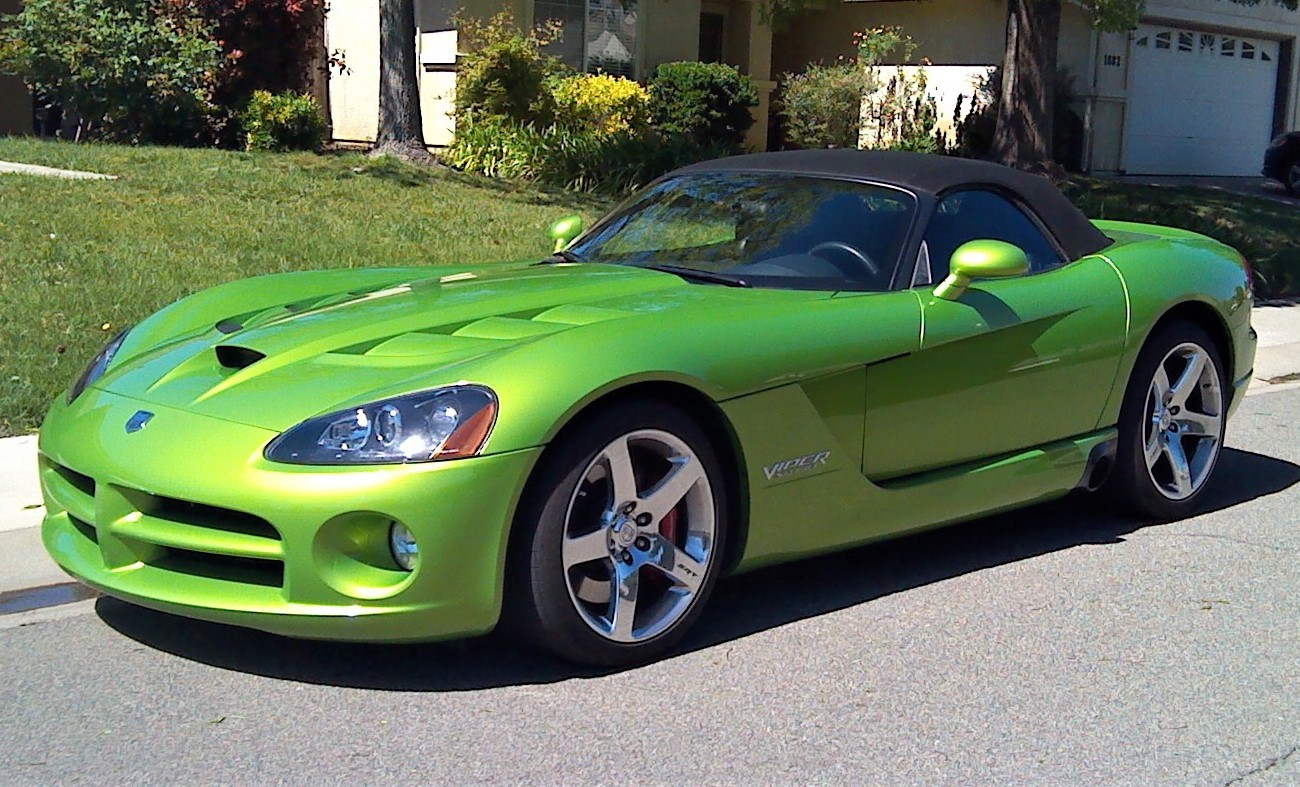

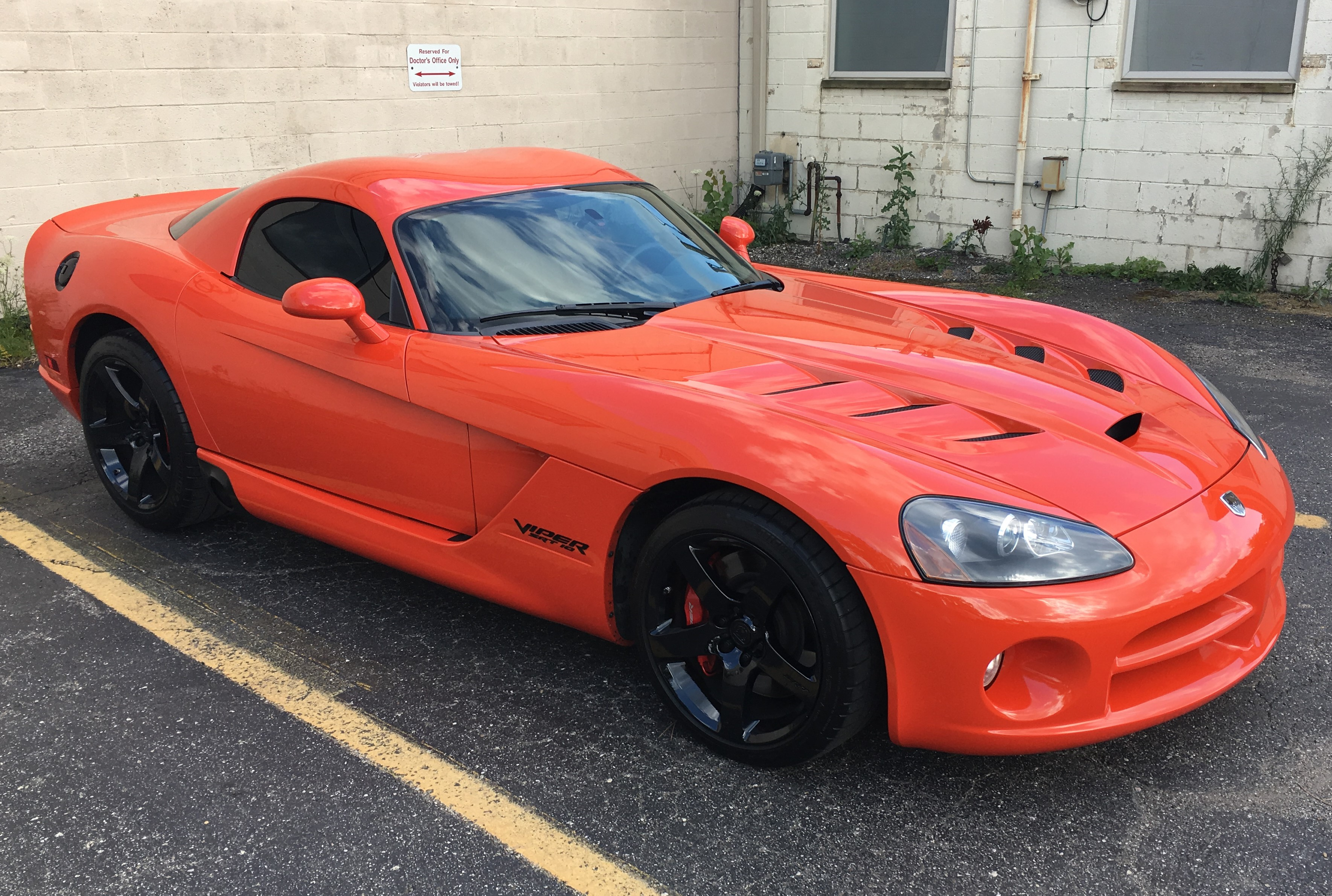
The fourth generation Viper SRT-10 coupe and roadster evolved on the previous car.

In 2008, with the introduction of the 8,382 cc (8.4 L; 511.5 cu in) V10 engine, the power output was raised from 500 hp (507 PS; 373 kW) to 600 hp (608 PS; 447 kW) at 6,100 rpm and 560 lb⋅ft (759 N⋅m) of torque at 5,000 rpm. The engine also received better flowing heads with larger valves, Megadyne cam-in-cam variable valve timing on the exhaust cam lobes, and dual electronic throttle bodies. The rev limit could be increased by 300 rpm due to the improved valvetrain stability from both the new camshaft profiles and valve springs. The engine was developed with some external assistance from McLaren Automotive and Ricardo Consulting Engineers. Electronic engine control was developed by Continental AG; the controller can monitor the crankshaft and cylinder position up to six times during each firing and has 10 times more processing power than the previous unit.

Changes outside of the engine were less extreme, but a distinction between the third and fourth generation of the Viper is the vented engine cover. The Tremec T56 transmission was replaced with a new Tremec TR6060 with triple first-gear synchronizers and doubles for higher gears. The Dana M44-4 rear axle from the 2003–2006 model featured a GKN ViscoLok speed-sensing limited-slip differential that greatly helps the tires in getting grip under acceleration. Another performance upgrade was the removal of run-flat tires; the new Michelin Pilot Sport 2 tires increased grip and driver feedback and, along with revised suspension (springs, anti-roll bars, and shock valving), made the Viper more neutral in cornering.

Another notable change was the reworked exhaust system; previous third-generation cars had their exhaust crossover under the seats which resulted in a large amount of heat going into the interior, which was done initially to help improve the car's exhaust note, since the first two generations of the Viper, which had no crossover, were criticized for their lackluster exhaust notes. The car featured a new exhaust system with no crossover, reducing the heat that entered the interior.

The electrical system was completely revised for 2008. Changes included a 180-amp alternator, twin electric cooling fans, electronic throttles, and completely new VENOM engine management system. CAN bus architecture had been combined with pre-existing systems to allow for regulatory compliance. The fuel system was upgraded to include a higher-capacity fuel pump and filtration system.

The Viper ACR made a return for the ZB II generation and was put through its paces at the Nürburgring clocking in a record time of 7:22.1. Kuno Wittmer piloted a street legal 2010 Dodge Viper ACR to a record lap of 1:59.995 at Miller Motorsports Park in Tooele, Utah, on Monday, April 11, breaking the 2-minute mark for the first time in a production car on the 3.048-mile Outer Course configuration.

On November 4, 2009, Dodge Brand President and CEO Ralph Gilles announced that the Viper would end production in the summer of 2010.

During an event hosted by Dodge and the Viper Club of America on July 1, 2010, the final production ZB II Viper, which was given a gold finish and accentuated by contrasting orange stripes, rolled off the assembly line and was presented before attendees of the ceremony.

== Fifth generation (VX I, 2013–2017) ==
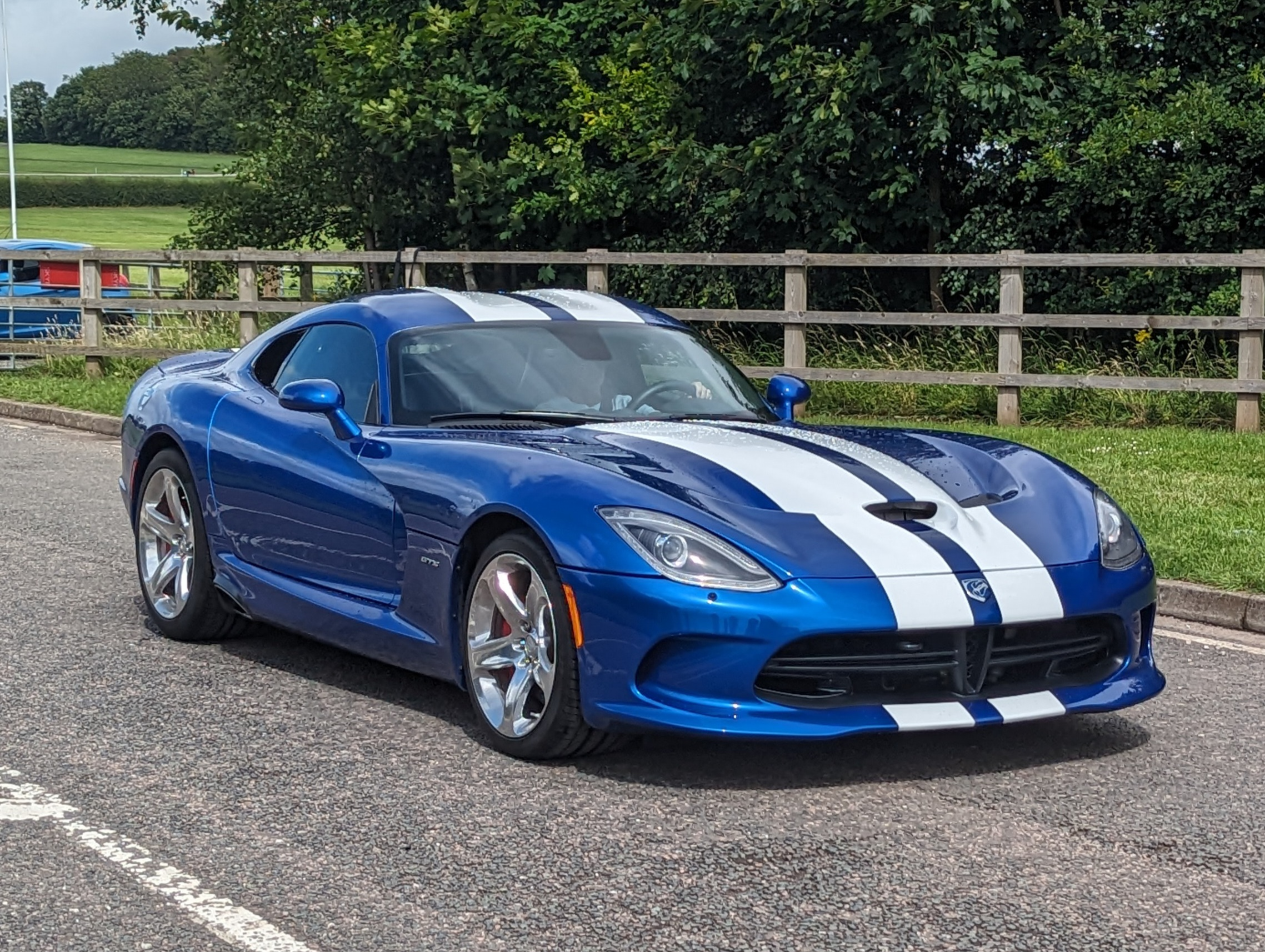
Fifth generation Dodge Viper GTS.

Although Chrysler considered ending production because of serious financial problems, on September 14, 2010, then-chief executive Sergio Marchionne was reported to have announced and previewed a rolling 2012 Dodge Viper prototype at a dealer conference in Orlando, Florida.

The Viper was also on display for one night only in Salt Lake City, Utah at the 11th Viper Owners Invitational or VOI 11 from September 30, 2010 to October 3, 2010. Ralph Gilles was in attendance and gathered feedback from potential customers about the exterior design of the car. The Generation-5 badge was unveiled as well at this event on each dining table in the hall. In Autumn of 2011, Ralph Gilles announced that the next generation of the Viper would debut at the New York Auto Show in April 2012. The 2013 model year SRT Viper was unveiled at the 2012 New York Auto Show.

The new all-aluminum V10 engine was upsized to 8,382 cc (8.4 L; 511.5 cu in), rated at 640 hp (477 kW; 649 PS) at 6,150 rpm and 600 lb⋅ft (813 N⋅m) of torque at 4,950 rpm, and coupled by a Tremec TR-6060 six-speed manual transmission with a final drive ratio of 3.55. The transmission saw a 50% improvement in torsional stiffness over the previous generation. Electronic assists were also introduced for the first time to a Viper, which now included electronic stability control, traction control, a four-channel anti-lock brake system. The body was built using carbon fiber and aluminum and featured a drag coefficient of 0.364 Cd. The base Viper came equipped with Pirelli P Zero Z tires and four-piston Brembo brakes with fixed-aluminum calipers and vented 355x32mm diameter rotors. It reached a top speed of 206 mph (332 km/h) and a 0–62 mph (0–100 km/h) time of 3.50 seconds.

The only notable change for the 2014 model year was the addition of a third traction control mode for improved performance during rain. In 2015, the Dodge Viper was renamed the SRT Viper and the engine received an extra 5 horsepower, raising the maximum power output to 645 hp (481 kW). There was also an improved highway fuel economy of 20mpg.

The fifth generation Viper generally received poor sales. In October 2013, production was reduced by a third due to low sales and growing inventory. In April 2014, production ceased for over two months due to slow sales. Dodge addressed the issue by reducing the price of unsold 2014 models by US$15,000 and announced the 2015 models would carry the new, lower price tag. In October 2015, Fiat Chrysler group announced that the Viper would end production in 2017. Initially, Fiat Chrysler cited poor sales as a reason for discontinuing the Viper. Other sources have stated the car was discontinued because the Viper was unable to comply with FMVSS 226 safety regulation, which requires side-curtain air bags; SRT CEO Tim Kuniskis would confirm this in 2026.

In July 2017, Fiat Chrysler Automobiles announced they would be permanently closing the Conner Assembly Plant on August 31, 2017 following the end of the fifth generation Viper's production run.

== European market ==
The SR l and SR II Viper were exported to Europe and sold as a Chrysler Viper.

The ZB I Viper was sold in Europe during 2005–2006. It was the first model to be sold as a Dodge, as part of Chrysler's new sales strategy for the European market. In the United Kingdom it is referred to as a Viper, but was sold as the Dodge SRT-10, as the Viper name is a registered trademark in the UK.

== Special models ==
=== GT2 Champion Edition ===
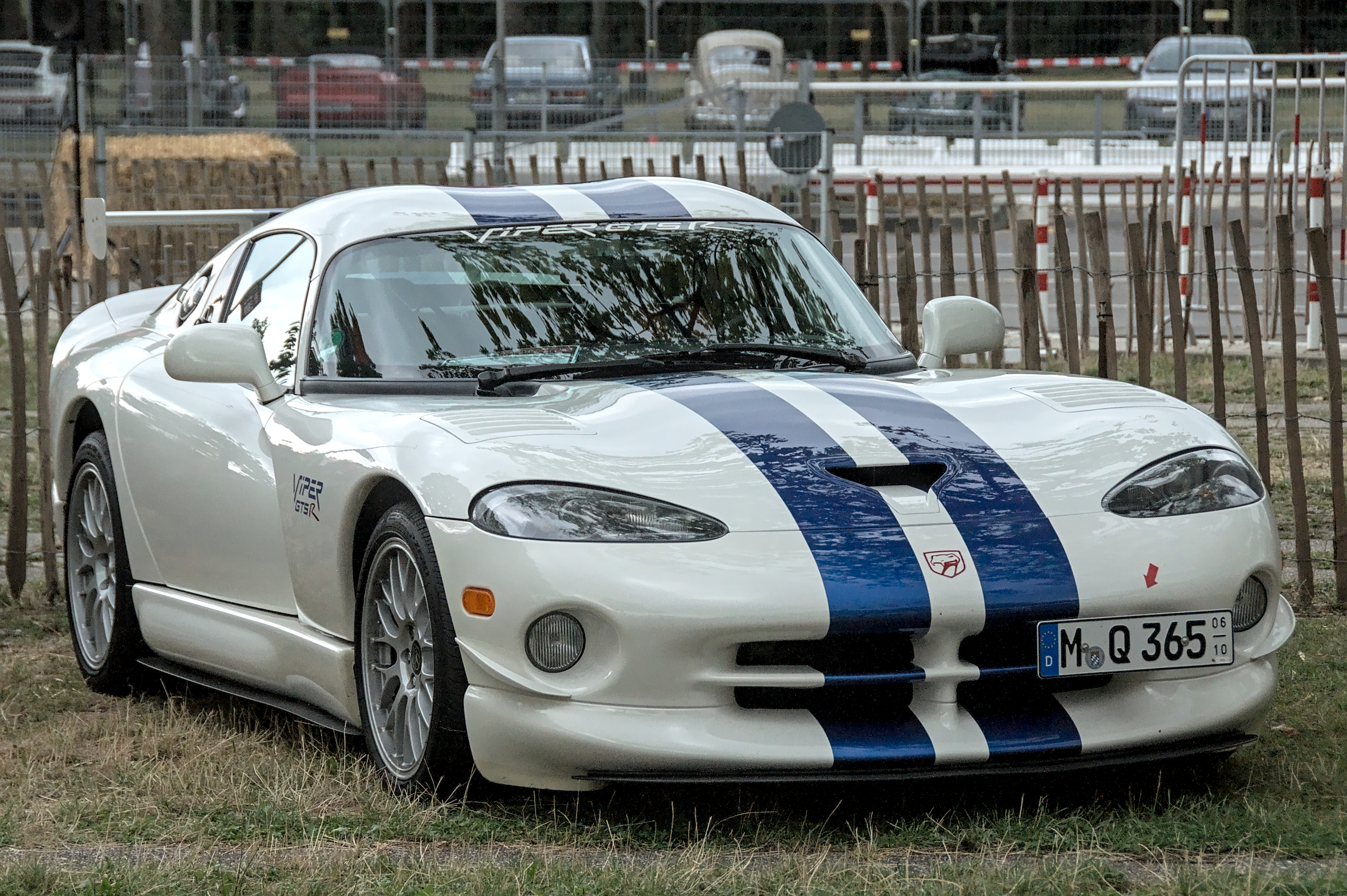
The Viper GT2 Champion Edition commemorated the Chrysler Viper GTS-R's successes in motor racing.

In 1998, the GT2 Champion Edition was introduced. With the FIA GT2 Team and Driver series wins in October 1997, Team Viper set forth with the development of a unique Viper model called the GT2 Champion Edition to commemorate the race wins. Contrary to popular belief, the GT2 Champion Edition was not built to meet any homologation effort, as the race car came first. Only 100 were ever produced.

The team started working on the concept in November 1997 with design concept approved in January 1998, prototype parts in February 1998, pricing approval of $85,200 in April 1998, and production from June 16 to July 7, 1998. The vehicles were the first to be built in VIN (Vehicle Identification Number) sequential order with the first having 001 as its last three on the VIN and the last being 100.

The GT2's exterior is best known for its white with blue stripes paint, large rear wing, front dive planes and splitter, side sills, American flag, BBS rims, and GTS-R badging, which caused many to refer to the vehicle as the GTS-R. However, the GTS-R was the race version of the Viper and not street legal. The GT2 also features an Oreca 5-point racing harness, and the center dash plaque with the vehicle's unique production number.

Power increased by 10 horsepower to 460 hp (343 kW) with the use of K&N air filter and smooth tubes connecting the filter to the intake manifold. Torque was also increased to 500 lb⋅ft (678 N⋅m).

=== American Club Racer ===
The American Club Racer (ACR) is a high-performance track-oriented model of the Dodge Viper. It became notable for its on-track performance, with ACR model Vipers having posted numerous lap times on various circuits.

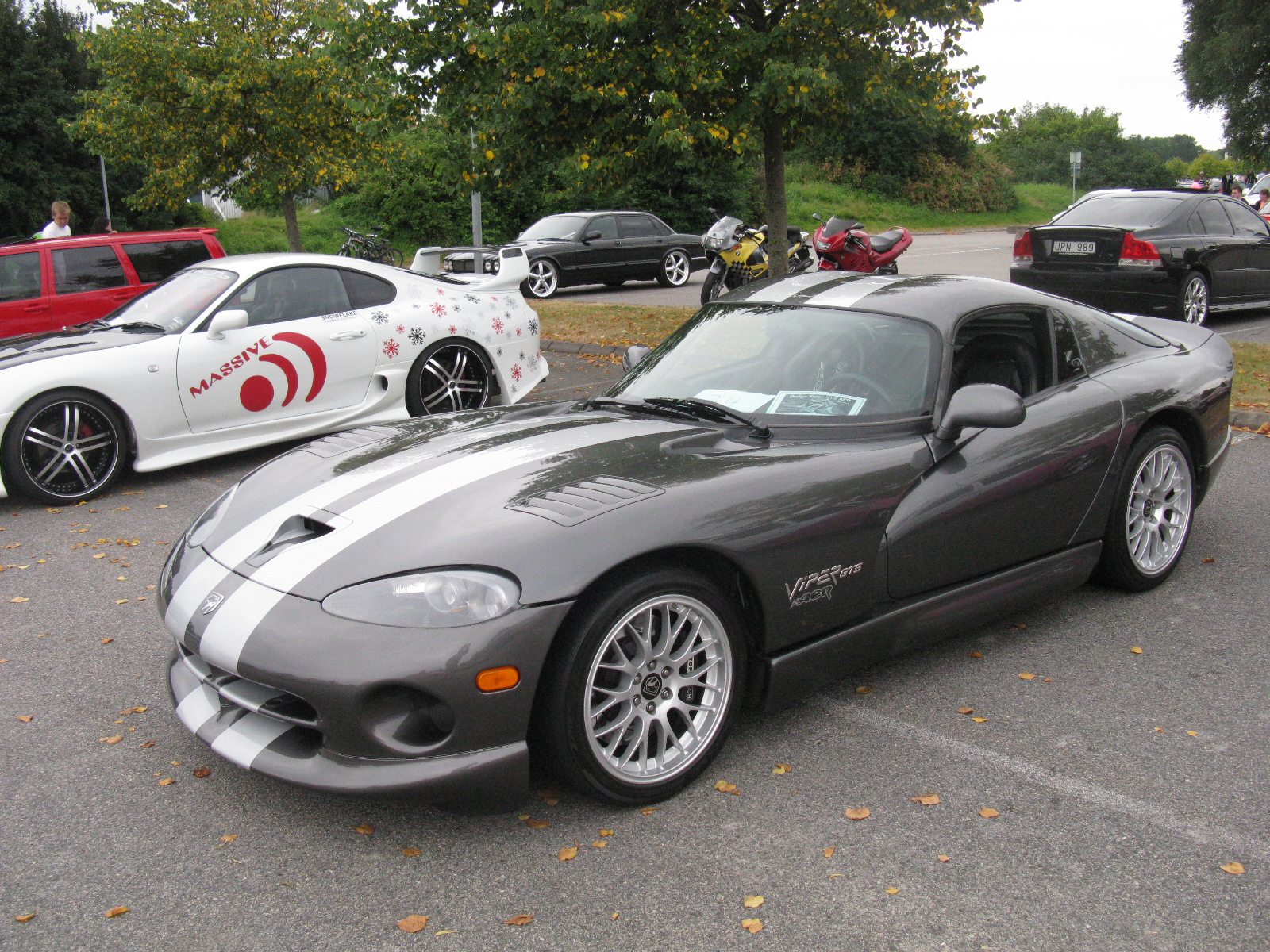
The original SR II ACR was an optional package available to the 1999 Viper GTS.

The first ACR was first introduced as a package on the second generation 1999 Viper GTS. The ACR used the same K&N air filter and smooth tubes from the GT2 for the power gains along with the BBS rims. A new five-point harness with the ACR logo was installed for both the driver and passenger. For the 1999 model year, Koni adjustable shocks were installed and changed to Dynamics later in the 2000 model year, and spring rates were increased. The ACR was available in solid color or with stripes with the color choices changing yearly along with ACR badging. It came standard with air conditioning and radio deleted, but could be added back in as a $10,000 option.

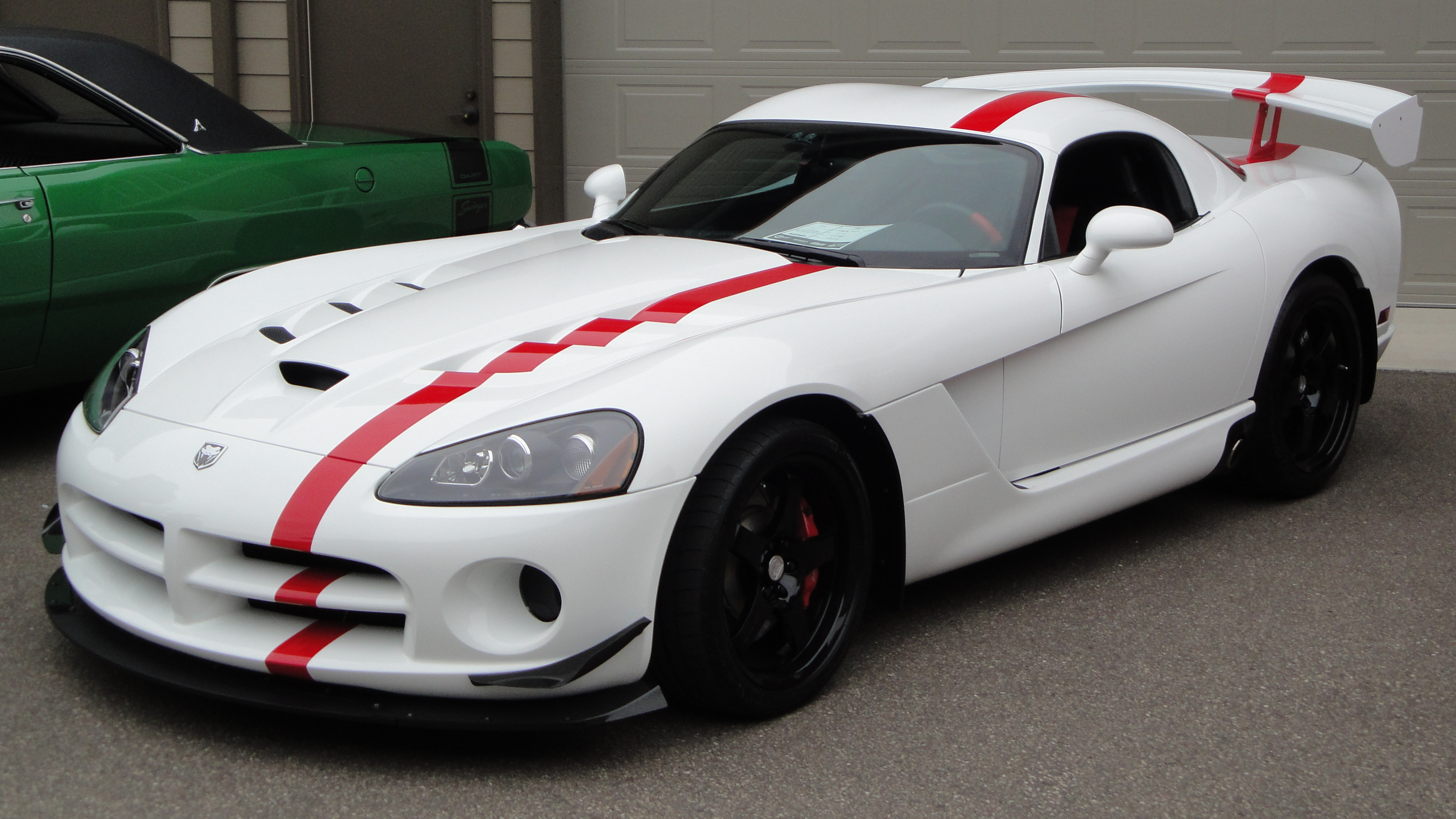

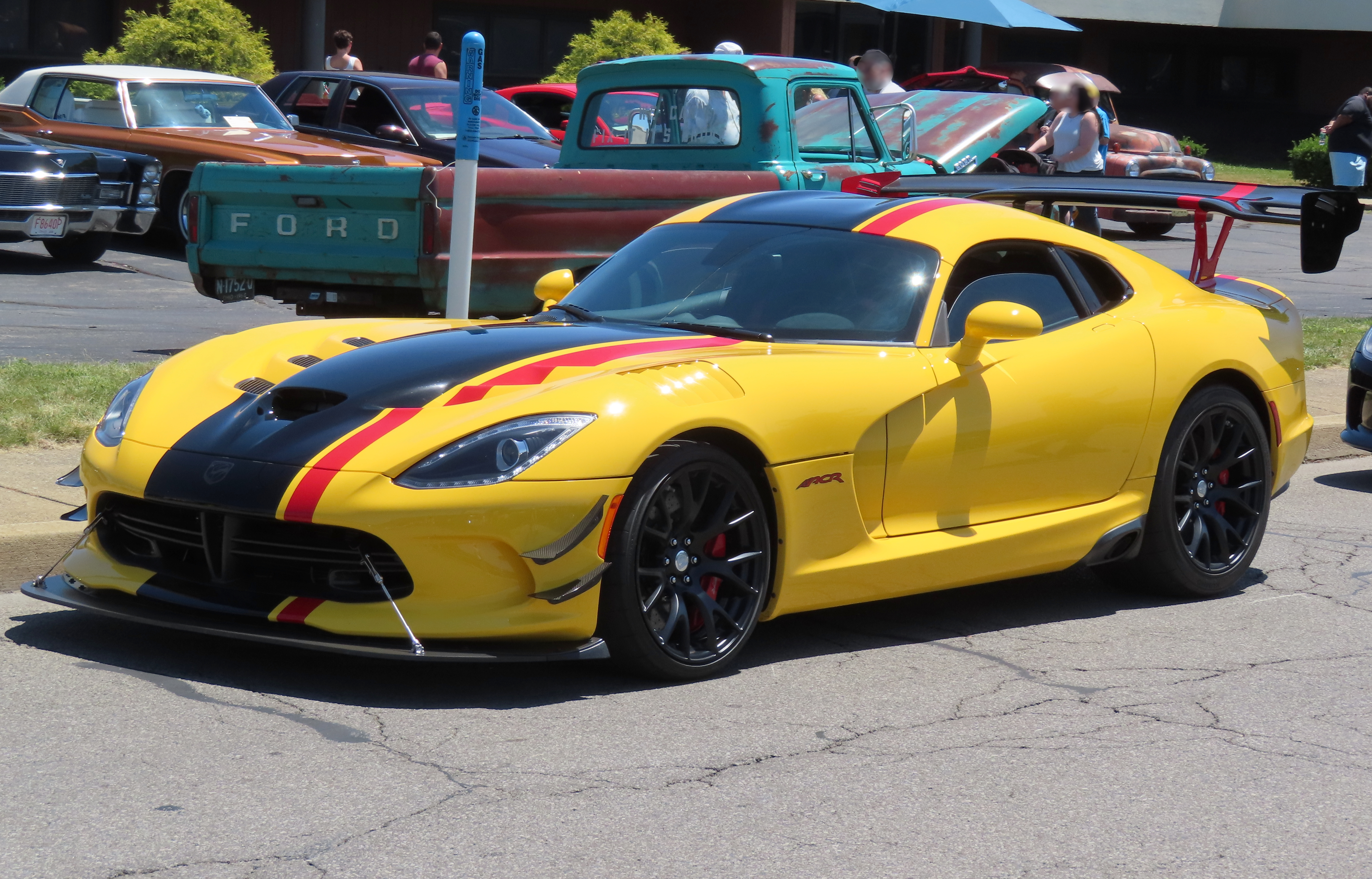
The ZB II and VX I versions of the ACR featured significant aerodynamic upgrades.

Later iterations of the ACR featured more drastic upgrades, including slicker street tires, adjustable sports suspension, lower weight, upgraded brakes, and a more aggressive carbon fiber aerodynamics kit producing significant levels of downforce. The ZB II generation ACR was capable of producing 1,000 lb (454 kg) of downforce at 150 mph (241 km/h). The VX I generation ACR produced 1,500 lb (680 kg) of downforce on corners and 2,000 lb (907 kg) of downforce with the 'Extreme Aero Package' option equipped. Top speeds were significantly reduced as a result of the specialized aerodynamic kits, losing as much as 20 mph (32 km/h), in exchange for highly improved cornering ability.

To commemorate the end of the ZB II generation Viper and mend the gap from the car's production end until the release of the new car, Dodge also offered an improved version of the ZB II generation ACR designed to run in the Dodge Viper Cup Series as a purpose-built track-only race car. This car, named Viper ACR-X, added 40 hp (30 kW), a new set of front canards, long tube headers from American Racing Headers, and new materials that, along with a stripped interior, reduced weight to 3,300 lb (1,497 kg). According to Dodge, the car beat the regular record-holding ACR around Laguna Seca by about three seconds (1:33.9 to 1:31). Price increased by US$12,000, to $110,000, with production planned for the spring of 2010. In February 2012, the Viper ACR-X posted a time of 7:03.058 around the Nürburgring, which was more than nine seconds faster than the regular Viper ACR.

The ACR model has previously attempted lap times around the Nürburgring Nordschleife. On September 14, 2011, a 2010 model year ACR completed the sixth fastest production, street-legal car lap ever recorded with a 7:12.13 time. Chrysler's press release claimed a new production car lap record, although three faster laps had been recorded more than two years earlier, albeit by very specialized low production vehicles. In October 2015, the ACR set an unofficial 7:01.67 lap time with the Extreme Aero Package, lapped by Dominik Farnbacher. Two years later, a crowdfunded attempt to reclaim the lap record on the Nürburgring Nordschleife on GoFundMe by volunteer Russ Oasis in 2017 gained support from numerous brands and racing drivers. The trip saw three lap attempts by Dominik Farnbacher, Mario Farnbacher, and Lance David Arnold. It ultimately ended with a crashed Viper ACR and a failed attempt to break the 6:52.01 lap of the second position car in street legal cars, the Lamborghini Huracán Performante. However, the team was still able to make the Viper ACR the fastest American, rear-wheel driven (with no additional assistance), and manual transmission equipped car to go around the track at the time. Their lap time also brought the car to fifth position for street legal vehicles at the time of the lap attempt.

== Concept cars ==
Concept cars of the Viper have typically served as precursors to future models, demonstration vehicles showcasing options and features available for Viper models, or as entirely different models using the Viper as a platform.

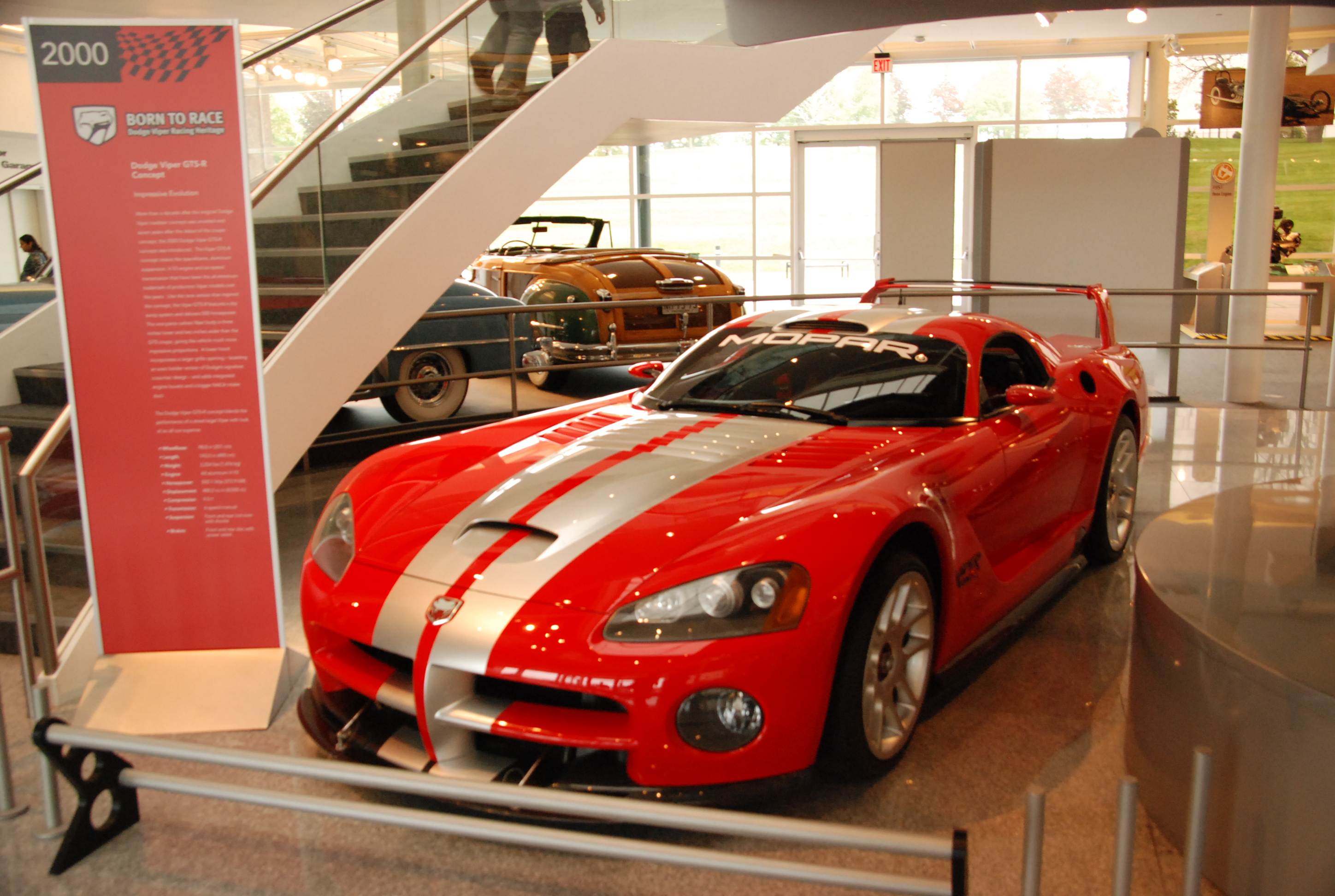
2000 Dodge Viper GTS-R Concept at the Walter P. Chrysler Museum.

In 2000, Dodge showcased the Viper GTS-R Concept. Japanese designer Osamu Shikado was responsible for the vehicle's exterior which was three inches lower and two inches wider than the production Viper at the time. Shikado used race-inspired lines with an aggressive stance. Most of these design cues were adapted to the ZB I generation Viper along with the interior. These included a higher belt line, a side gill, 'bump-up' rear fender shape, and a more defined side crease. Viewed from above, the front-to-rear stripe became tapered. Unlike most concepts, the 2000 Viper Concept was made as a complete car. It features a complete functional interior with air conditioning, adjustable pedals, and a premium sound system. Only one was ever made featuring a dry-sump V10 engine producing 500 hp (373 kW), fifty more than the then outgoing model, and 500 lb⋅ft (678 N⋅m) of torque. The body is a single molded carbon-fiber shell, with some subtle changes compared with the then outgoing model. An inch and a half has been taken out between the sill and the roof, which together with a chassis sitting two inches lower, gives the car a lower profile. Three inches have been added to the wheelbase and two inches to the track. The doors have also been lengthened, which combined with the longer wheelbase makes entry and exit from the car easier. Brakes are 14-inch ventilated discs with four-piston calipers. The front has the 19-inch wheels with P285/30 ZR Goodyear tires up front and 20-inch rear wheels with P335/30 ZR tires.

At the 2003 SEMA Show, Chrysler displayed the Viper SRT-10 Carbon Concept. The vehicle's name comes from the carbon fiber used to reduce the weight by 150 lbs bringing the total to 3,200 lbs. However, even more significant were the engine modifications, which increased power to 625 hp (466 kW); no torque or RPM figures were given. Along with the carbon fiber hardtop, a front splitter and rear wing were added; however those parts were not nearly as significant as those on the later SRT-10 ACR, and no downforce/drag information was provided to show that they were even functional. This car was later used as a test mule for the development for the Generation V SRT Viper. The car is no longer a show car, and most of its specialty parts were taken off during development for the new fifth generation Viper.

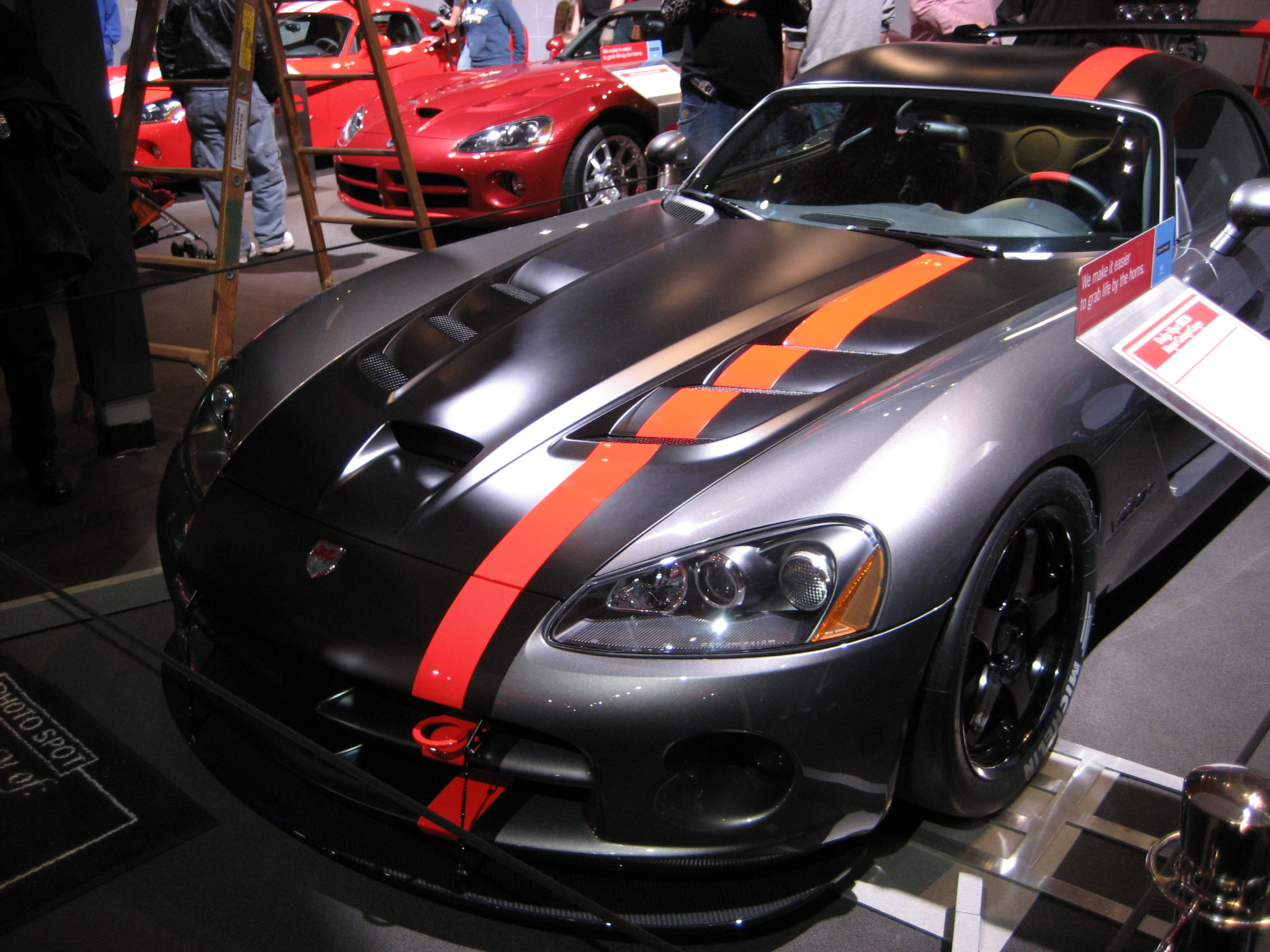
2007 Viper Mopar Concept at the 2007 Detroit Auto Show.

A prototype Viper with 675 hp (503 kW) appeared at the 2007 North American International Auto Show as the Viper Mopar Concept. Though not explicitly confirmed, the concept appeared to have been a sneak peek at the then-upcoming ZB II generation ACR. Performance parts from this car were sold by Mopar.

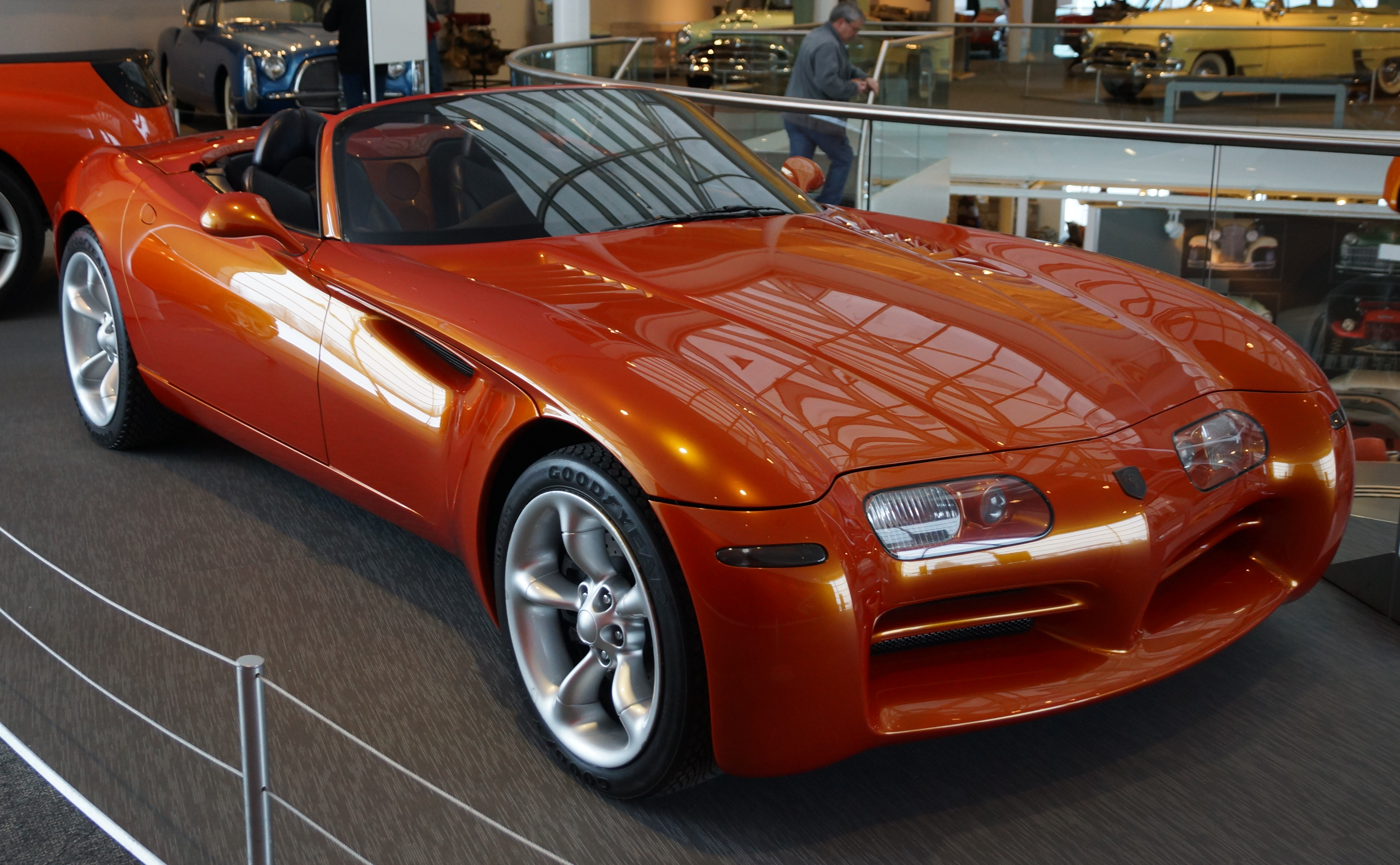
1997 Dodge Copperhead at the Walter P. Chrysler Museum.

Two concept cars have previously used the Viper as a platform. The Dodge Copperhead was a concept car that was intended as a cheaper, more agile car for buyers unable to afford the Viper. It was powered by Chrysler's 2.7-liter LH V6 engine instead of the Viper's V10, which produced 220 hp (164 kW; 223 PS). Dodge produced a limited-production Copperhead Edition Dodge Viper, with copper-colored paint similar to the concept car and other changes. The Chrysler Firepower was a concept based on the Viper chassis that would have featured the Hemi V8 coupled with an automatic transmission. Like the Copperhead, its price would have been lower than other models. Neither car reached production.

The SEMA Concept served as a preview for optional Mopar parts for the fifth generation Viper. Changes included yellow body colour, carbon fiber engine bay parts, an exposed carbon fiber performance cross-brace finished in satin with a decal-cut "Stryker" logo in the center, a carbon fiber and aluminum engine cover, aluminum oil filler cap, a carbon fiber aero package, Mopar coil springs, full black interior with yellow accents, Sabelt hard-shell seats with a six-point safety harness, seat edging in black Katzkin leather with yellow accents in the perforations, Mopar billet aluminum shift knob, billet aluminum HVAC bezels and controls, carbon fiber bulkhead satchel with a universal integrated quick-release camera mount, polished chrome door-sill guards with the Viper logo, race-inspired sand-blasted aluminum Mopar bright pedal kit with the Viper logo etched in the pedals, footrest pedal with "Stryker" logo, optional "Track Pack" wheels finished in Hyper Black, a front tow hook and an LED fog lamp kit. The parts found in the SEMA Concept were sold as 2013 components.

== Racing ==
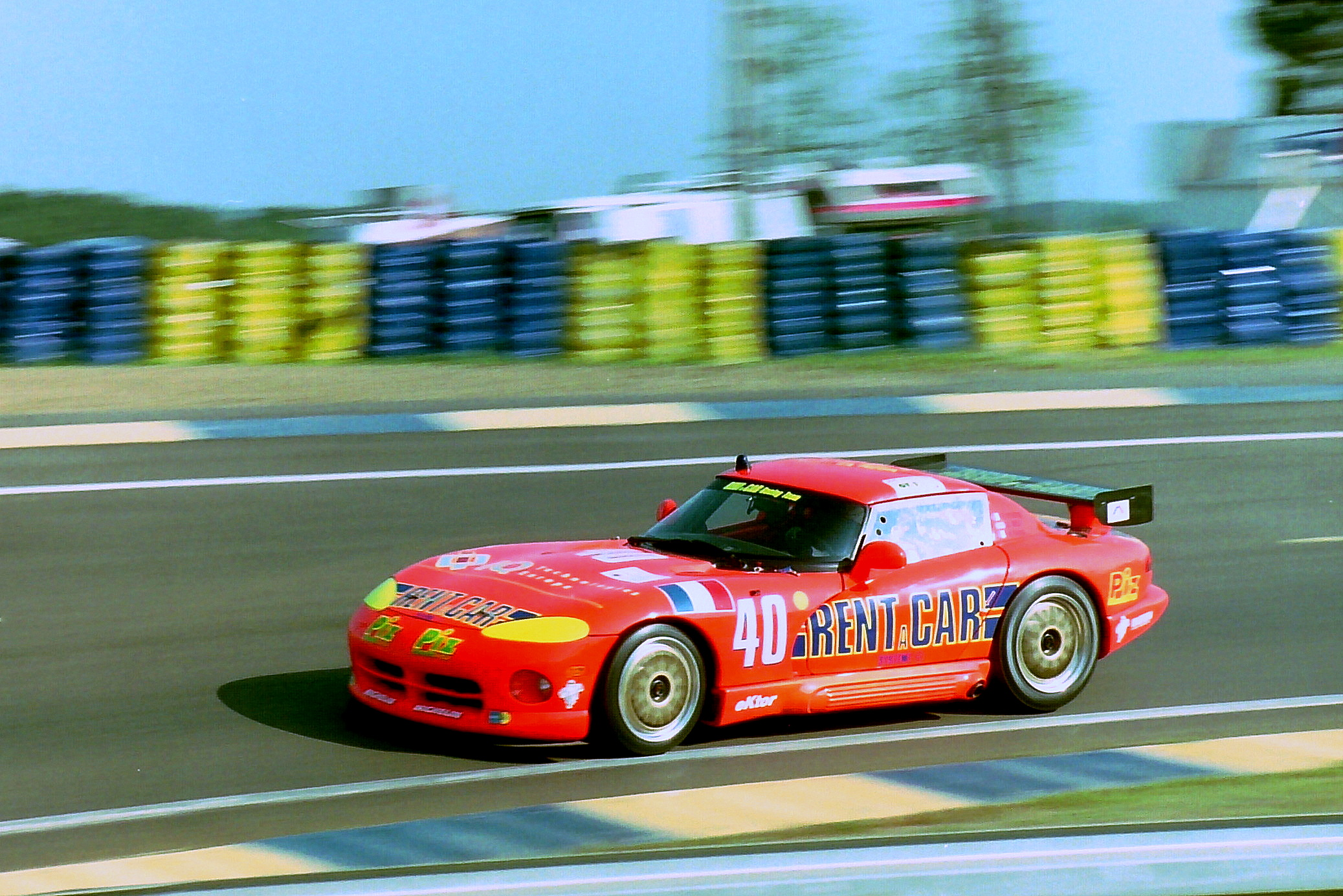
Rent-A-Car Racing's modified Dodge Viper RT/10 used at the 1994 24 Hours of Le Mans was the first known Viper to go racing.

The earliest occurrence of a Viper competing in a motor race came in 1994, which saw two Viper RT/10s campaigned by French racing team Rent-A-Car Racing during the 1994 24 Hours of Le Mans in a privateer effort, which was subsequently the first time a Viper entered the 24 Hours of Le Mans annual endurance racing event. The #40 car, driven by René Arnoux, Bertrand Balas, and Justin Bell, finished 12th overall and 3rd in the LM-GT1 class. The #41 of Philippe Gache, François Migault, and Denis Morin was not classified.

Across all three generations of the Viper, Dodge have developed and supported three iterations, the SR II, ZB I, and VX I. The Viper saw a total of 62 championships in over twenty years of competition.

=== GTS-R ===
==== SR II ====
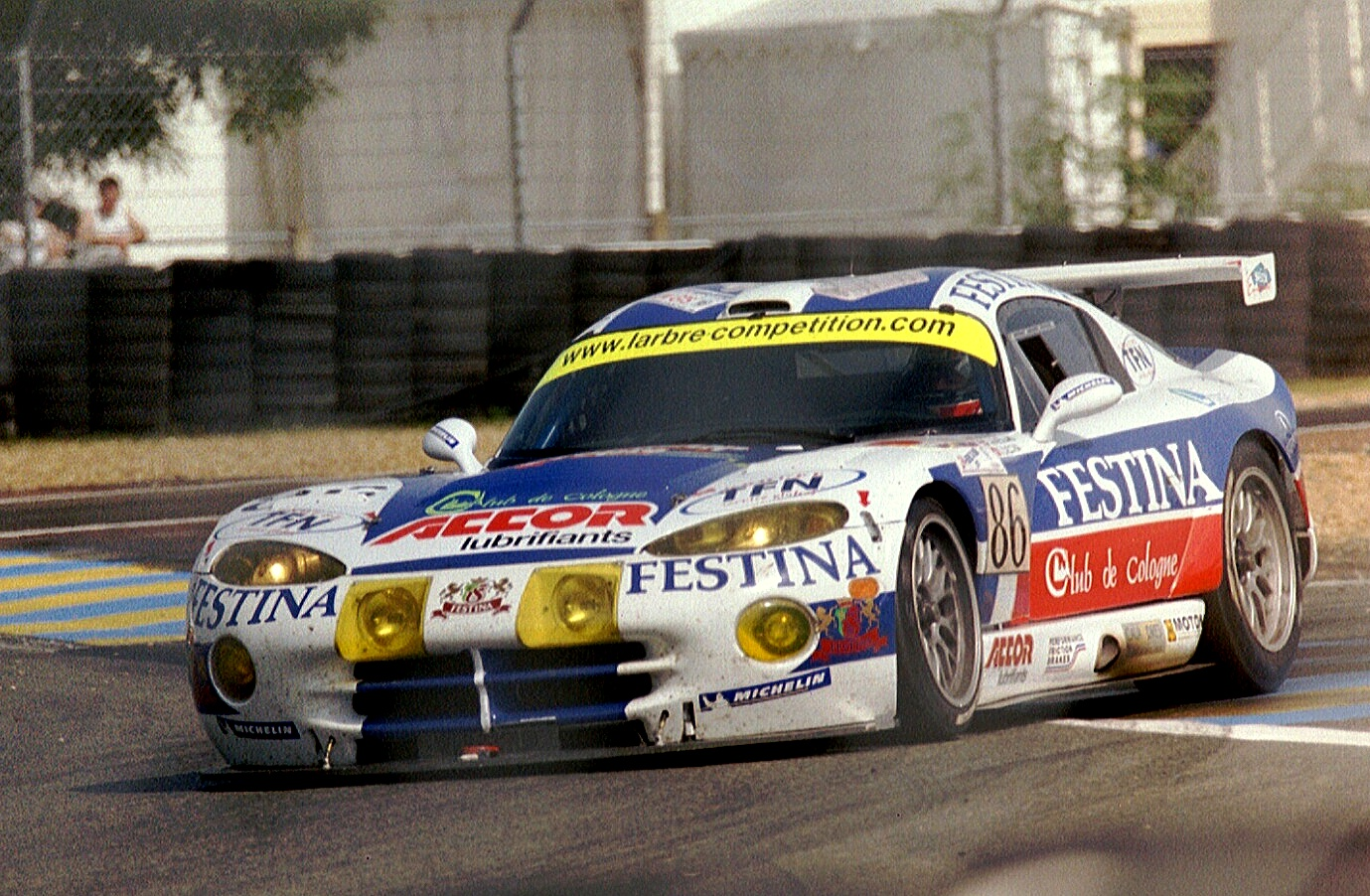
The Chrysler Viper GTS-R (pictured at the 2003 24 Hours of Le Mans) was highly successful, winning a total of 47 titles.

While not originally intended to compete in motorsport, Chrysler Corporation eventually went with the idea in 1995 in order to help market the Viper and improve its public perception. Chrysler enlisted numerous groups including Oreca, Reynard Motorsport, and Riley & Scott to help with development, and in 1996, the first Viper GTS-R was built. The first ten examples saw seven constructed by Chrysler in Detroit, Michigan and three completed by Oreca in Magny-Cours, France. It was the company's first car developed through computer-aided design.

The car debuted at the 1996 24 Hours of Daytona and finished 29th overall. Chrysler also entered the Viper GTS-R at Le Mans for the first time at the 1996 24 Hours of Le Mans as a factory effort with Canaska Southwind Motorsport and Oreca. The car's performance increased rapidly over time, as the car secured numerous wins in special events, including three consecutive class victories at the 24 Hours of Le Mans in 1998, 1999, and 2000, an overall victory at the 24 Hours of Daytona in 2000, and back-to-back wins at the Spa 24 Hours in 2001 and 2002. At the Nürburgring 24 Hours, Zakspeed took wins in 1999, 2001, and 2002 with a V8-powered Viper GTS-R, as engine restrictions required the maximum displacement to be at 6.2 liters and prevented the team from using the base 8.0-liter V10. Oreca's efforts in the 1999 American Le Mans Series saw them earn nine wins and the overall title, with an additional victory by Paul Belmondo Racing. Oreca and Chamberlain Engineering also finished first and second in the 1999 FIA GT Championship standings, respectively.

At the time of its retirement, the Viper GTS-R competed in 445 races and took 47 championships (23 teams', 24 drivers'), 162 wins, 213 podiums, and 117 pole positions.

==== VX I ====
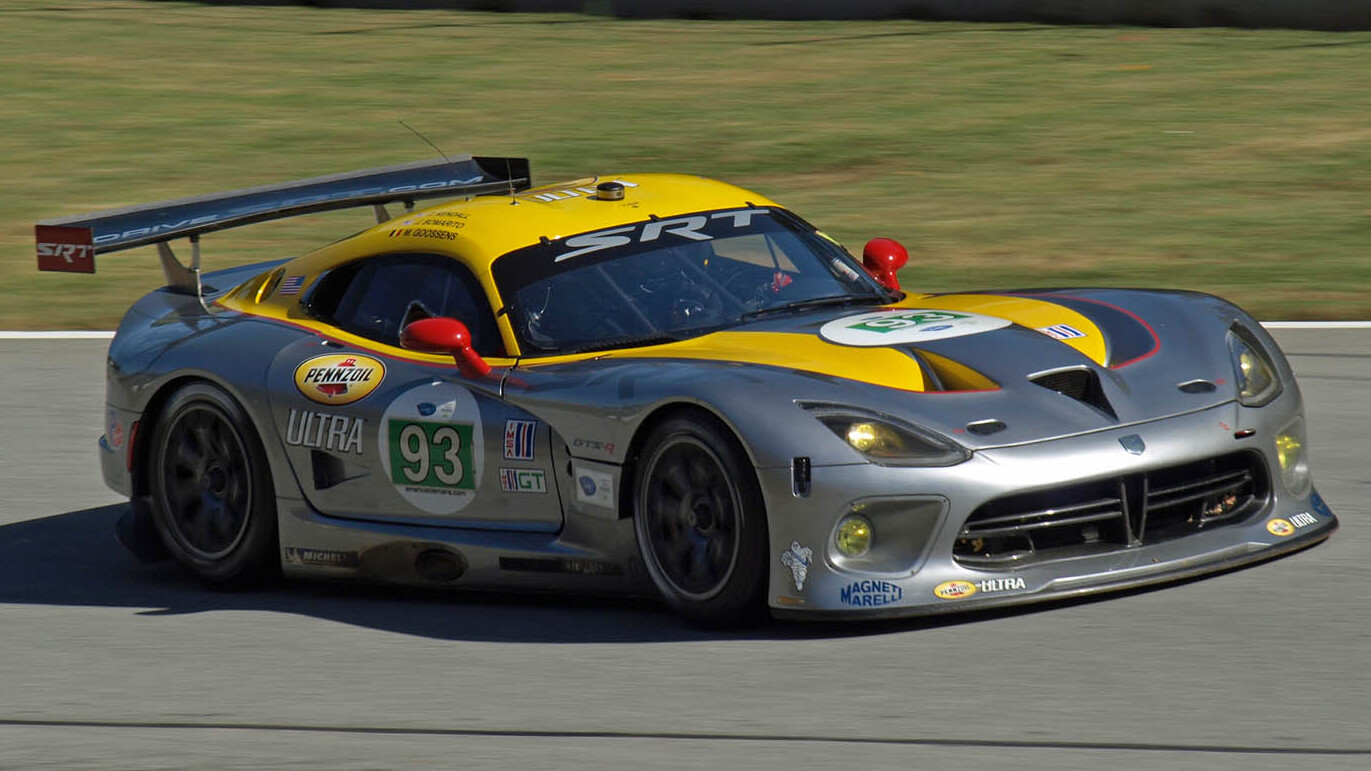
The SRT Viper GTS-R at the 2012 Petit Le Mans.

The GTS-R badge returned in 2012 with the third generation Viper. Designed and built by SRT Motorsports and Riley Technologies for the LM GTE class, the SRT Viper GTS-R was unveiled at the 2012 New York Auto Show, and made its racing debut at the 2012 Mid-Ohio Sports Car Challenge. Two GTS-Rs were entered, with car #91 driven by Kuno Wittmer and Dominik Farnbacher, and car #93 by Marc Goossens and Tommy Kendall.

With the new GTS-R, the Viper name returned to Le Mans at the 2013 24 Hours of Le Mans after several years away from the endurance race. Balance-of-performance regulations encouraged the car to run an unusually low rev limit of 4,700 rpm at Le Mans, taking advantage of the large V10 engine's low-end torque. The Viper GTS-R was unremarkable in its two Le Mans appearances, finishing 8th in class in 2013 and withdrawing in 2014.

The Viper GTS-R's most successful run came at the 2014 United SportsCar Championship, where in the GTLM class with SRT Motorsports, it won the 2014 Brickyard Grand Prix and 2014 Lone Star Le Mans on route to a drivers' and teams' championship with Kuno Wittmer. Despite its championship victory, Fiat Chrysler Automobiles ended their factory program at season's end, effectively retiring the Viper GTS-R.

=== Competition Coupe ===
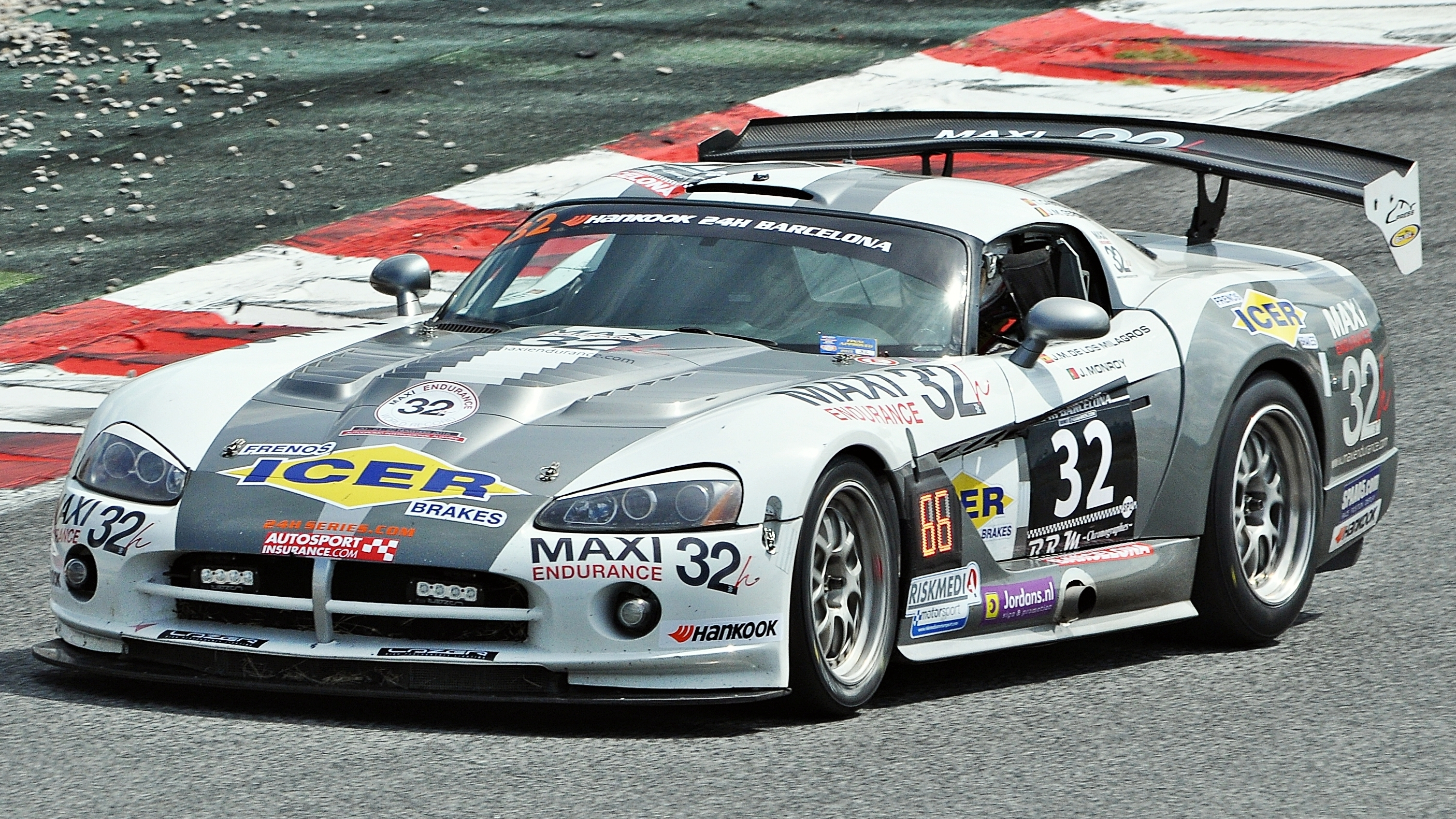
The Dodge Viper Competition Coupe at the 2015 24 Hours of Barcelona.

A new race car called the Dodge Viper Competition Coupe was unveiled for the second generation Viper. Originally a one-make race car, it was later adapted for Group GT3 racing.

The new car was built with a carbon fiber composite body on a tubular steel frame with no interior trim and an FIA-legal roll cage, re-tuned suspension, new safety gear, and a redesigned coupe body style. Modifications to the mechanicals of the Viper included a 27-gallon fuel cell, differential cooler, ducted brakes, improved driver and engine cooling, trap door oil pan, low-inertia flywheel, an improved double-wishbone suspension system, new spherical bearing control arm attachments, two-way adjustable coil over dampers, and a driver-adjustable blade-type rear anti-roll bar. The anti-lock braking system added a distribution control system. The Viper Competition Coupe retained the 8.3-liter V10 engine from the road legal Viper, but increased power and torque to 520 hp (388 kW; 527 PS) and 540 lb⋅ft (732 N⋅m). In a May 2004 test by Car and Driver, the Viper Competition Coupe recorded a 0–60 mph (0–97 km/h) of 3.1 seconds, 0–100 mph (0–161 km/h) of 7.0 seconds, 0–150 mph (0–241 km/h) of 15.6 seconds, a quarter-mile of 11.2 seconds @ 130 mph (210 km/h), and a G-force of 1.19 g on a 300 ft skidpad.

Later in the car's production, Oreca returned to help the Viper Competition Coupe meet Group GT3 regulations, and in 2006, the Viper Competition Coupe GT3 was created in preparation for the 2006 FIA GT3 European Championship. Three teams raced the new Viper, with Racing Logistic nearly winning the overall championship, but they ultimately settled for 2nd, with Racing Box in 3rd, and Pouchelon Racing down at 9th in the standings. In the British GT Championship, the Viper Competition Coupe GT3 was able to win back-to-back championships in 2007 and 2008. Rapid development from rival manufacturers eventually caused the Viper to fall behind.

150 units of the Viper Competition Coupe were produced. In 335 races, the Viper Competition Coupe took 12 championships (6 teams', 6 drivers'), 45 wins, 60 podiums, and 16 pole positions.

=== GT3-R ===
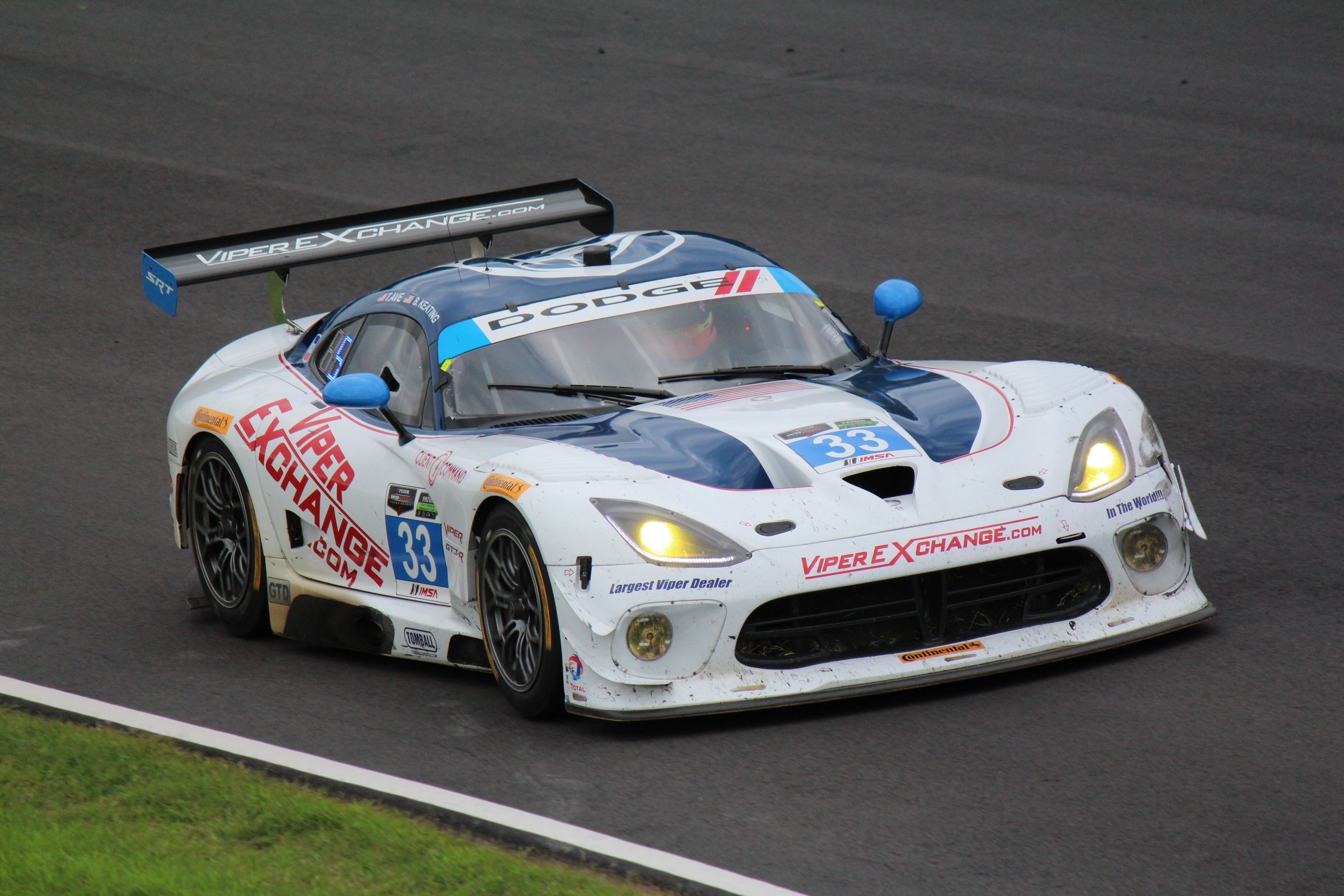
The SRT Viper GT3-R at the 2014 Oak Tree Grand Prix.

The Viper GT3-R was made available in the later half of 2013 at an estimated cost of $459,000, and served as the Group GT3 version of the GTS-R. Like its LM GTE counterpart, it was developed by SRT Motorsports and Riley Technologies and retains many of its internal parts, including the 8.4 liter V10 capable of developing 680 hp (507 kW; 689 PS) unrestricted. It was the second GT3 race car from Dodge, succeeding the Competition Coupe.

The first win for the Viper GT3-R came on July 13, 2014, taking victories in Canada at the 2014 SportsCar Grand Prix at Mosport in GTD in the 2014 United SportsCar Championship, and race two of the Streets of Toronto support race weekend in the 2014 Pirelli World Challenge. Dutch Supercar Challenge squad Team RaceArt won the 2014 and 2015 Super GT class championship in a Viper GT3-R.

== Media ==
=== Viper television series ===
Chrysler launched a TV series called Viper in 1994 to serve as a promotional tool for the Viper. The show ran until 1998 with 1 NBC season and 3 syndicated follow-up seasons. Viper is a TV series about a special task force set up by the federal government to fight crime in the fictional city of Metro City, California that is perpetually under siege from one crime wave after another. The weapon used by this task force is a grey assault vehicle known as The Defender that masquerades as a Dodge Viper RT/10 roadster (and later, the Viper GTS coupe). The series takes place in "the near future". The primary brand of vehicles driven in the show were Chrysler or subsidiary companies. The series ran on NBC for one season in 1994 before being revived two years later for three more seasons of first-run syndication. Reruns of the series have appeared on Sci-Fi Channel and USA Network.

The Viper Defender "star car" was designed by Chrysler Corporation engineers unlike most Hollywood Film/TV cars that are usually customized by film picture designers. The car was built on a heavily modified RT/10 Chassis and is a completely functional prototype. Only 14 Defenders were made. The exterior design of the car was produced by Chrysler stylist Steve Ferrerio.

The Defender is a fictional assault vehicle that is said to be a highly sophisticated vehicle (contrary to the normal Viper's spartan nature) that can, at the flick of a switch, transform from a red RT/10 (later a blue GTS) into a grey/silver weaponized armored coupe.

=== Viper-themed video games ===
The Dodge Viper (SR II) is featured exclusively in the 3D game Viper Racing, produced in 1998 by Monster Games Incorporated (MGI) and Sierra On Line. In 1998, Sega Pinball released, Viper Night Drivin.

=== Video game cover art ===
The SRT Viper GTS was featured on the cover art for Forza Horizon for the Xbox 360.

The Viper SRT10 was featured on the cover art for Race Driver: Grid.

The Viper was also featured on Test Drive 5 (NTSC version) and Test Drive 6's cover art.

The Dodge Viper was featured on the front cover of the North American "US Tuned" release of Auto Modellista.
