= Excitebike =

1984 video game

- North American NES box art
- Developer: Nintendo R&D4 (Note: PC-88 and X1 versions developed by Hudson Soft; Nintendo 3DS version developed by Arika.)
- Publishers: Nintendo; PC-88, X1; Hudson Soft
- Director: Shigeru Miyamoto
- Producer: Shigeru Miyamoto
- Designer: Shigeru Miyamoto
- Programmer: Toshihiko Nakago
- Composers: Akito Nakatsuka; Soyo Oka (FDS)
- Series: Excite
- Platform: Nintendo Entertainment System: Arcade, PC-88, X1, PC-8001mkIISR, MZ-2500, Famicom Disk System, Nintendo e-Reader, Game Boy Advance, Nintendo 3DS
- Release: November 30, 1984: NES; JP: November 30, 1984; NA: October 18, 1985; EU: September 1, 1986 Arcade; JP: December 1984; NA: March 1985 PC-8801; JP: October 1985 X1; JP: 1985 Famicom Disk System; JP: December 9, 1988 e-Reader; NA: September 16, 2002 Game Boy Advance; JP: February 14, 2004; NA: June 7, 2004; EU: July 9, 2004 Nintendo 3DS; WW: June 6, 2011
- Genre: Racing
- Modes: Single-player, multiplayer
- Arcade system: Nintendo VS. System, PlayChoice-10

Excitebike (Note: Japanese: エキサイトバイク, Hepburn: Ekisaitobaiku) is a 1984 racing video game developed and published by Nintendo for the Nintendo Entertainment System. It was ported to arcades for the Nintendo VS. System later that year and Famicom Disk System in 1988. In North America, it became one of the best-selling games on the console. It was the first game in the Excite series.

Designed and directed by Shigeru Miyamoto, the smooth side-scrolling game engine his team developed for Excitebike was later used to develop Super Mario Bros. (1985), which had the effect of Mario smoothly accelerating from a walk to a run, rather than move at a constant speed.

Excitebike was a critical and commercial success. It spawned several sequels and has been re-released multiple times onto other Nintendo platforms, such the Wii's and Wii U's Virtual Console, and the Nintendo Classics service.

== Gameplay ==
The player jumps high above the computer racers.

Excitebike is a side-scrolling racing game in which the player takes control of a motocross racer. The two gameplay modes are Selection A as a solo race run, and Selection B against computer-controlled opponents. The objective of the game is to finish in third place or higher in a preliminary race to qualify for the Excitebike championship race. The A button accelerates the bike, and the B button activates a turbo boost that enhances the bike's speed, but overheats the engine if it is used for too long, forcing an immobile cooldown period. The engine's temperature can be reset by driving over arrows located along the course. The player can use the directional pad to shift between lanes, and to shift the racer's balance midair after a jump. Landing squarely on both wheels allows the racer to maintain momentum, but an uneven landing will result in a loss of speed or a crash. As the game progresses, the player must contend with additional obstacles on the track such as gaps, rough patches that slow the bike if hit, and bottlenecks with only two lanes instead of four.

Design Mode allows players to create tracks using 19 types of hurdles, with options to save and load created tracks for the Famicom Data Recorder tape drive, which was unreleased outside Japan.

== Other releases ==
=== VS. Excitebike ===
There are two enhanced versions, both titled Vs. Excitebike.

The first version was released on VS. UniSystem for arcades in 1984, after the Famicom release. It is similar to its Famicom Disk System counterpart, though this version lacks the Design option and has three difficulty levels. There is one major gameplay difference: if the player causes five opponents to crash their bikes (without the player themselves crashing) the overheat gauge turns white and the colors of the player's sprite change. The player is now able to use unlimited turbo until they crash; then the gauge and the sprite colors go back to normal.

The second was released for the Famicom Disk System peripheral in 1988. The graphics and core gameplay are still the same, and the FDS version has several distinctive features that the NES and arcade versions lack:

- "VS. Excite" mode puts two players competing against each other. The options include the maximum number of rounds to play, the track, and the number of laps.
- The music is completely different; none of the songs from the original game are present, and it has a gameplay theme. The music is composed by Soyo Oka.
- The "Original Excite" mode is based on the main mode of the arcade version, with minor differences such as a different color palette.
- Its writable disk format can save created tracks.

=== Excitebike: Bun Bun Mario Battle Stadium ===
Excitebike: Bun Bun Mario Battle Stadium, (Note: Japanese: エキサイトバイク ぶんぶんマリオバトルスタジアム, Hepburn: Ekisaito Baiku: Bunbun Mario Batoru Sutajiamu) also known as Mario Excite Bike or BS Excitebike, is a remake of Excitebike released for the Japan-only Satellaview peripheral for Super Famicom. The human racers have been replaced by Mario, Luigi, Princess Peach, Wario, Toad, and some of Bowser's Koopa Troopas. The concept was unchanged except for a "SUPER" mode where the player has unlimited turbo and coins spread across the courses to increase top speed in a manner similar to the Mario Kart series.

=== Re-releases ===
The original Excitebike is an unlockable bonus game in Left Field Productions' Excitebike 64, which was released in 2000 for the Nintendo 64. It is also one of several unlockable NES games in Animal Crossing for the GameCube, released in 2001. The Nintendo 64 version restores the Save and Load functionality in Design mode, though it is limited to saving one custom track on the Game Pak, while the Animal Crossing version can be transferred to the Game Boy Advance by using a link cable. Excitebike was also released for the Game Boy Advance in the form of e-Reader cards, and later as a Game Pak for the Classic NES Series.

Excitebike was added to the Wii's Virtual Console in Europe on February 16, 2007, the same day its spiritual successor, Excite Truck, was released there. The game was later added to the North American Virtual Console on March 19. It was re-released in North America for the Wii U's Virtual Console on April 26, 2013. 3D Classics: Excitebike was released on the Nintendo 3DS as a launch game for the Nintendo eShop in America, Japan and Europe; the game was initially offered for free for a period but then was sold at £5.40 / €6.00 for European markets and $5.99 in the US. It features 3D stereoscopic support and analog control support. This release was featured among other games from the Nintendo Entertainment System and Super NES to be released for the 3DS on a tech demo called Classic Games at E3 2010. It allows the player to save up to 32 custom created tracks that can be played in either 2D or 3D.

Excitebike is one of the 30 games available on the NES Classic Edition, released by Nintendo on November 11, 2016. VS. Excitebike was released on the Nintendo Switch in the Nintendo eShop in September 2018, by Hamster Corporation as part of the Arcade Archives series under license from Nintendo.

== Reception ==
Reviews

Aggregate score
Aggregator	Score			
Aggregator	Arcade	GBA	NES	Wii
Metacritic	N/A	71/100	N/A	N/A

Review scores
Publication	Score			
Publication	Arcade	GBA	NES	Wii
1Up.com	N/A	C+	N/A	N/A
AllGame	N/A	3.5/5	5/5	N/A
Computer and Video Games	N/A	N/A	8/10; 84%	N/A
GameSpot	N/A	6.2/10	N/A	N/A
IGN	N/A	7/10	N/A	8.4/10
Computer Gamer	Positive	N/A	N/A	N/A
Play Meter	10/10	N/A	N/A	N/A
Tilt	N/A	N/A	8/20	N/A

In Japan, Game Machine listed VS. Excitebike as the fifth most successful table arcade unit of January 1985. In North America, the game was number 13 on the RePlay arcade software charts in December 1985. It ended the year as America's second highest-grossing arcade system game of 1985, below Nintendo's own Hogan's Alley.

The game has received generally positive reviews. Allgame gave Excitebike its highest possible rating of five stars and referred to the game as a "staple of any NES collection", praising its graphics as cute and its controls as simple yet still requiring strategy to apply properly. The review noted the design mode, as "the first of its kind in a console game, and greatly extends the life of the title by featuring 19 different components you can piece together to build your own course". IGN praised the NES version in 2007 as "ridiculously addictive" and that it "proves video games don't need to have flashy graphics or complex AI to actually be fun. Sure, there are other racing games out there today, hundreds of them. This one may not necessarily be better than the recent stuff, but it's unique, addictive, and demonstrates what gaming is really about". IGN ranked Excitebike as the 14th best NES game. GamesRadar ranked it as the 12th best game on the NES Classic Edition, saying that it has aged well with "a great sense of speed while driving and an excellent sense of balance while jumping and landing". Game Informer ranked the game 44 on its top 100 games of all time.

Kotaku editor Jason Schreier ranked it as the worst game on the NES Classic Edition, calling it "a truly awful video game" but with no explanation.

== Legacy ==
The side-scrolling gameplay of Excitebike was key to the development of Super Mario Bros. (1985). The same Miyamoto-led team that developed Excitebike went on to develop a 1985 NES port of side-scrolling beat 'em up arcade game Kung-Fu Master (1984) called Kung Fu. Miyamoto's team used the technical knowledge they had gained from working on both side-scrollers to further advance the platforming "athletic game" genre they had created with Donkey Kong (1981) and were key steps towards Miyamoto's vision of an expansive side-scrolling platformer. While working on Excitebike and Kung Fu, he devised the concept of a platformer in which the player can "strategize while scrolling sideways" over long distances, and has colorful backgrounds rather than black. Super Mario Bros. utilized the fast scrolling game engine Miyamoto's team had originally developed for Excitebike, which allowed Mario to smoothly accelerate from a walk to a run, rather than move at a constant speed like in earlier platformers.

Excitebike spawned several sequels, including Excitebike 64 (2000), Excite Truck (2006), Excitebots: Trick Racing (2009), and the WiiWare game Excitebike: World Rally (2009). An Excitebike-themed track was released as downloadable content for Mario Kart 8 (2014), and was available by default in Mario Kart 8 Deluxe (2017). A group of Excitebike racers cameo as an Assist Trophy in Super Smash Bros. Brawl.
