= Tony Stewart's Sprint Car Racing =

2020 racing video game

- Developer: Monster Games
- Publisher: Monster Games
- Platforms: Microsoft Windows; PlayStation 4 Xbox One
- Release: Consoles: NA: February 14, 2020; Windows: NA: February 21, 2020
- Genre: Racing
- Modes: Single-player, multiplayer

Tony Stewart's Sprint Car Racing is a sprint car racing video game developed and published by Monster Games in collaboration with sprint car and NASCAR team owner and former driver Tony Stewart. It was released for the PlayStation 4 and Xbox One on February 14, 2020 and on Microsoft Windows on February 21, 2020. The game had a sequel released in the same year, Tony Stewart's All American Racing, also produced by Monster Games.

== Gameplay ==
Tony Stewart's Sprint Car Racing is a racing simulator, where players can race three different types of sprint cars through 24 fantasy tracks. In career mode, players start in the All-Star TQ Midgets and have to race their way up to the 410 Winged Sprint Cars in the All Star Circuit of Champions. There is also a 24-player online mode and an offline split-screen mode for multiplayer.

== Reviews ==
Game Informer gave the game a 70% score.
