= Viper Racing =

1998 video game

- Developer: Monster Games
- Publisher: Sierra On-Line
- Producer: Owen Justice
- Designers: Owen Justice; Dave Pollatsek
- Programmers: Richard Garcia; Dave Broske
- Artists: Troy Harder; Brian McCabe
- Platform: Windows
- Release: NA: November 1998; EU: 1998
- Genre: Sim racing
- Modes: Single player, up to 8 players in multi-player

Viper Racing is a Dodge-licensed 3D car racing game, released in 1998 on the Windows PC platform. It was the first commercially released game developed by Monster Games.

== Development ==
The game was developed in two years with a team of six people.

== Reception ==
Reception

Aggregate score
Aggregator	Score
GameRankings	81%

Review scores
Publication	Score
AllGame	2.5/5
CNET Gamecenter	8/10
Computer Games Strategy Plus	4/5
Game Informer	6/10
GameRevolution	B
GameSpot	8.5/10
Jeuxvideo.com	17/20
PC Accelerator	8/10
PC Gamer (UK)	81%
PC Gamer (US)	89%
PC PowerPlay	80%

The game received favorable reviews according to the review aggregation website GameRankings.

The game was a finalist for Computer Games Strategy Plus' 1998 "Racing Game of the Year" award, which ultimately went to Motocross Madness. The staff called the former "a fabulously rich game experience, with an excellent career mode and more customization options than you could find at a real Dodge dealer."
