= Excitebike: World Rally =

2009 video game

- European artwork
- Developers: Monster Games; Nintendo SPD
- Publisher: Nintendo
- Director: Richard Garcia
- Producers: Kensuke Tanabe; Shinya Takahashi
- Composer: Daisuke Shiiba
- Series: Excite
- Platform: Wii
- Release: NA: November 9, 2009; JP: February 2, 2010; PAL: February 5, 2010
- Genre: Racing
- Modes: Single-player, multiplayer

Excitebike: World Rally, known as Excitebike: World Race (Note: Japanese: エキサイトバイク ワールドレース) in Japan and Excitebike: World Challenge in PAL regions, is a racing video game developed by Nintendo and Monster Games and published by Nintendo for the Wii. It is the fifth and final title in the Excite racing series, and is the first since the original Excitebike to feature classic 2D racing. The game was announced through the NOA edition of the Nintendo Channel in October 2009, via an episode of Nintendo Week, and was released shortly after as a WiiWare title in North America on November 9, in Japan on February 2, 2010, and in PAL regions on February 5.

World Rally borrows the same concept as the racing title released for the NES in 1984. The game's core design is that of a time trial arcade racer; that is, each race sees players attempting to get to the finish line in the shortest period of time possible. In contrast to that NES game, the game included an online multiplayer mode, where the players could play anonymously over the internet, or with friends in a similar fashion to Mario Kart Wii. The game received mixed reviews from critics.

== Gameplay ==
World Rally features the ability to change camera angles. Here, the default isometric camera angle is being used.

World Rally follows a similar premise as the original Nintendo Entertainment System title released in 1985. The game's core design is that of a time trial arcade racer, that is, each race sees players attempting to get to the finish line in the shortest period of time possible. The player's bike has two options, an accelerator and a turbo function, the latter increases the player's engine temperature and overheating will cause the player's bike to stall. As in Excite Truck and Excitebots, the game features ranks players by S, A, B, C, and D grades which are determined by how well the player performs in races. Only gaining a rating of B or higher will allow the player to progress to the next stage. Getting an S rank will unlock a new bike color. Races take place throughout different fictional tracks around the world, and include locales from London, America, Japan and Mexico.

World Rally included an online component, where the players could play anonymously over the internet, or with friends in a similar fashion to Mario Kart Wii. Depending on which place they finished, they received points. If the players got a certain number of points, a new bike design was unlocked. Much like the original title, Excitebike: World Rally has a level editor, which allowed players to create tracks and share them over the internet. Unlike the original title, there is no option to race alone.

== Development ==
World Rally was developed by Monster Games and announced in October 2009 through the NOA edition of the Nintendo Channel, via an episode of Nintendo Week. In an interview on 1UP's Retro Gaming Blog, the developers of the game "wanted to approach this project with a clean slate and take advantage of the new abilities of the Wii: the 3-D graphics, the motion controls and the availability of Wi-Fi play" and "be able to enhance the game play in ways that were not possible with the original hardware".

== Reception ==
Reception

Aggregate scores
| Aggregator | Score |
|---|---|
| GameRankings | 72% (17 reviews) |
| Metacritic | 70% (25 reviews) |

Review scores
| Publication | Score |
|---|---|
| Eurogamer | 7/10 |
| GameSpy | 2/5 |
| GameTrailers | 7.1/10 |
| IGN | 7.9/10 |
| Nintendo Life | 9/10 |
| Official Nintendo Magazine | 81% |

World Rally received mixed reviews; the game holds a score of 72% on GameRankings and a score of 70/100 on Metacritic. In his review on IGN, Craig Harris gave the game a 7.9/10 and called it "one of the better WiiWare offerings available". Christian Donlan of Eurogamer gave the game a 7/10 and said: "That's pretty much applicable to the wider experience, really. Like Nintendo's original, ExciteBike: World Rally is simple fun. This is no Trials HD, but it's still great to play as a chummy pass-the-controller game, and nice to have stuck on an SD card for a rainy Sunday afternoon when there are no Columbo reruns to watch on television. Nostalgic, colorful and modest, this is retro-gaming at its least self-conscious." Ryan Scott of GameSpy, however, gave the game 2 stars, and said that the game was fun for a few minutes; Ryan called the game "an unremarkable remake of a game that didn't age too well" and added "nothing's truly new or captivating here. It feels like a half-hearted cash-in designed to prey on our nostalgia, not unlike Teenage Mutant Ninja Turtles: Turtles in Time Re-Shelled. It's nothing but a curiosity, fun for the few minutes prior to the realization of just how badly Excitebike has aged".
