= Monster Games =

American video game developer

Monster Games, Inc.
- Type: Subsidiary
- Industry: Video games
- Founded: November 1996; 29 years ago
- Founder: Richard Garcia, David Pollatsek, David Broske
- Defunct: July 17, 2025; 12 months ago
- Fate: Merged with iRacing Studios
- Successor: iRacing Studios
- Headquarters: Northfield, Minnesota, U.S.
- Key people: David Broske, John Schneider
- Parent: iRacing.com Motorsport Simulations (2022–2025)

Monster Games, Inc. was an American video game developer in Northfield, Minnesota, United States that specialized in racing games. They have also ported multiple Wii games to newer platforms for Nintendo. The company was founded in 1996, and was acquired by iRacing.com Motorsport Simulations in 2022.

In 2025, parent company iRacing.com Motorsport Simulations founded iRacing Studios, and subsequently merged Monster Games into the new company.

== History ==
In January 2022, Monster Games was acquired by iRacing.com Motorsport Simulations, LLC. Over a year later in October of 2023, iRacing had purchased the exclusive NASCAR video game license from Motorsport Games. Subsequently, Monster Games and iRacing began work on a new licensed NASCAR title. It was announced that the game would release in 2025 and be called NASCAR 25.

In July 2025, iRCMS merged Monster Games into their brand new gaming company iRacing Studios. The team at Monster Games would continue their work on NASCAR 25 under the new iRacing Studios banner.

== Games developed ==
List of games developed by Monster Games
Year	Title	Platform(s)	Publisher(s)
1998	Viper Racing	Microsoft Windows	Sierra On-Line
2000	NASCAR Heat	Microsoft Windows; PlayStation	Hasbro Interactive
2001	NASCAR Heat 2002	PlayStation 2 Xbox	Infogrames
2002	NASCAR: Dirt to Daytona	GameCube; PlayStation 2	Infogrames
2004	Test Drive: Eve of Destruction	PlayStation 2 Xbox	Atari
2006	Excite Truck	Wii	Nintendo
2009	Excitebots: Trick Racing	Wii	Nintendo
2009	Excitebike: World Rally	WiiWare	Nintendo
2011	Pilotwings Resort	Nintendo 3DS	Nintendo
2013	Donkey Kong Country Returns 3D	Nintendo 3DS	Nintendo
2014	Donkey Kong Country: Tropical Freeze (co-developed with Retro Studios)	Wii U	Nintendo
2015	Xenoblade Chronicles 3D	New Nintendo 3DS	Nintendo
2016	NASCAR Heat Evolution	Microsoft Windows; PlayStation 4 Xbox One	Dusenberry Martin Racing
2017	NASCAR Heat 2	Microsoft Windows; PlayStation 4 Xbox One	704Games
2018	NASCAR Heat 3	Microsoft Windows; PlayStation 4 Xbox One	704Games
2019	NASCAR Heat 4	Microsoft Windows; PlayStation 4 Xbox One	704Games
2020	Tony Stewart's Sprint Car Racing	Microsoft Windows; PlayStation 4 Xbox One	Monster Games
2020	Tony Stewart's All American Racing	Microsoft Windows; PlayStation 4 Xbox One	Monster Games
2021	SRX: The Game	Microsoft Windows; PlayStation 4 Xbox One	GameMill Entertainment
2022	World of Outlaws: Dirt Racing	PlayStation 4 PlayStation 5 Xbox One; Xbox Series S/X	iRacing.com Motorsport Simulations
2023	World of Outlaws: Dirt Racing	Nintendo Switch	iRacing.com Motorsport Simulations
2024	World of Outlaws: Dirt Racing 24	PlayStation 4 PlayStation 5 Xbox One; Xbox Series S/X	iRacing.com Motorsport Simulations
2025	World of Outlaws: Dirt Racing 24	Microsoft Windows	iRacing.com Motorsport Simulations
