= Excite Truck =

2006 video game

- North American cover art
- Developer: Monster Games
- Publisher: Nintendo
- Director: Richard Garcia
- Producers: Kensuke Tanabe; Keisuke Terasaki
- Designer: Owen Justice
- Composers: Kenji Yamamoto; Masaru Tajima
- Series: Excite
- Platform: Wii
- Release: NA: November 19, 2006; JP: January 18, 2007; EU: February 16, 2007; AU: February 22, 2007
- Genre: Racing
- Modes: Single-player, multiplayer

Excite Truck (Note: Japanese: エキサイト トラック, Hepburn: Ekisaitotorakku) is a 2006 racing video game developed by Monster Games and published by Nintendo for the Wii. It features malleable environments and tilt-based motion controls. The game was one of the Wii launch titles in North America. It is the third main game in the Excite series (following 1984's Excitebike and 2000's Excitebike 64) and the first to feature vehicles other than motorbikes.

Excite Truck is the first Wii game to let players select music, in the form of MP3s from an SD card, to be played in the background while they are playing instead of the music provided by the game. This feature is also used by Endless Ocean.

The game received generally positive reviews from critics. A sequel, Excitebots: Trick Racing, was released for the Wii in North America in April 2009, and Japan in August 2011 via Club Nintendo.

== Gameplay ==
Excite Truck does not use the Nunchuk attachment; it is controlled entirely with the Wii Remote. When first starting the game the player must go through a series of tutorials before they are allowed to play the full game. After finishing the first tutorial, both single and multiplayer modes are available. The player first starts with three trucks, but later on, they are able to unlock additional trucks by reaching various benchmarks. The game also supports split screen two player multiplayer.

=== Scoring ===
Crossing the finish line first is not the goal of Excite Truck, but rather another avenue for gaining stars. Stars are scored for a variety of stunts, and for the player's placement at the end of the race. A letter grade is awarded for each race, corresponding to the number of stars obtained, with the S rank being the highest grade possible. Getting S ranks in all tracks on the regular Excite difficulty level unlocks a harder "Super Excite" difficulty level. Getting S ranks in all tracks on the Super Excite difficulty level unlocks an even more difficult Mirror Mode level.

In single player Excite mode, all tracks have a required number of stars to advance further in the game. The player is not required to finish in first place as long as they gain the number of stars required during the race. Races are timed to prevent players from reversing back across high-star areas and completing the same stunts over and over again.

=== Winning races ===
In single player mode, the player receives bonus stars following the race depending on how they placed. These stars are applied to your score before determining if the player has completed the track's minimum score.

In multiplayer races, the player who crosses the finish line first receives a bonus of 15 stars. Additionally, once the first player has crossed the line, a 30-second countdown is triggered for the second player. For each second that the second player has not completed the race, an extra star is awarded the first finisher. If the timer expires, the second player is disqualified with no score.

=== Play modes ===
Excite Truck features several gameplay modes, most of them for a single player:

- Excite Race: The player competes in several cup races. After completing each race in a cup (a race is completed by racing it and scoring the required number of stars), a new cup will be opened, and new tracks can be raced. The new tracks are accessible immediately in Excite Race and Versus modes.
- Super Excite Race: The harder difficulty unlocked after completing every race in the Excite Race mode with a score of "S". More stars are required, rings are more spaced apart, and a new track not in Excite is introduced.
- Mirror Race Mode: An even more difficult mode in which all the tracks are mirrored and the rings are smaller, unlocked after completing every race in the Super Excite Race with a score of "S".
- Challenge: The player must maneuver their vehicle through a series of Gate, Ring, and Crush Challenges with the first three trucks.
- Super Challenge: A more difficult series of Gate, Ring, and Crush Challenges.
- Versus: The multiplayer aspect of the game, which allows two players to race one another.

=== Racing areas ===
Excite Truck features several locales to race in, all which are, for the most part, based on real life locations. These locations include China, Scotland, Mexico, Fiji, Finland and Canada. The only course in the game that is not based on a real-life environment is a fantasy crystal mountain named Nebula, which, as the name describes, is a fictional environment located under a purple crystal-like nebula.

=== References to past Excite titles ===
The game is a spiritual sequel to NES title Excitebike and the N64 title Excitebike 64. The developers passed down and updated many features that made the original games popular. For example, the giant cliffs and jumps from the NES title return, as the courses feature many hills and cliffs that make the player jump unrealistically high altitudes with their truck. In fact, the main item of the game lets players change the land to make the levels even more "extreme" than they were originally designed. As in all Excite titles, it is important to adjust the angle of the vehicle so its wheels land parallel to the ground; in Excite Truck, a massive turbo boost is rewarded for a perfect landing.

A gameplay element also carried from both the NES and N64 titles is overheating. When the player uses too much boost, their engine will overheat, temporarily reducing the top speed of their truck. Driving the truck into shallow water will instantly cool the engine all the way down, so infinite boost can be used while in water. Also while in mid-air the engine cools down so a player could boost and overheat approaching a jump and then have a cooled engine when they land. Water can be either part of the course or it can be reached using a land-deformation powerup. However, the truck will be counted as "crashed" if it drives into darker-colored deep water, and it must be reset the same way as any crash.

== Release ==
The game was first playable during E3 2006, and an updated build was also playable during the Nintendo Fusion Tour the same year, with four different courses playable. Prior to its release at the Wii launch, the game was one of the first titles to be playable on the first Wii Kiosks, along with Wii Sports and The Legend of Zelda: Twilight Princess.

The game was released in the US on November 19, 2006, simultaneous with the launch of the Wii. Excite Truck was the 9th best selling game for the Wii during November.

The game was released on January 18, 2007 in Japan, and in February for Europe and Australia. An Excite Truck themed toy truck was offered with Wendy's Kids Meals as part of a promotion with Nintendo.

== Reception ==
Reception

Aggregate scores
| Aggregator | Score |
|---|---|
| GameRankings | 75.18% (based on 69 reviews) |
| Metacritic | 72/100 (based on 57 reviews) |

Review scores
| Publication | Score |
|---|---|
| Game Informer | 7/10 |
| GameSpot | 6.8/10 |
| GameTrailers | 6.5/10 |
| IGN | 8.0/10 |
| Nintendo Power | 85/100 |
| Official Nintendo Magazine | 84/100 |
| X-Play | 4/5 |

On Metacritic, a website that aggregates review scores, Excite Truck garnered a score of 72 out of 100, indicating "mixed or average reviews".

- E3 2006 Game Critics Awards: Best Racing Game
- AIAS' 10th Annual Interactive Achievement Awards: Racing Game of the Year (nomination)

== Legacy ==
In Super Smash Bros. Brawl, one of the trucks appears as one of the obtainable trophies and some other trucks are stickers. Additionally, the music that plays on both the results screen and a replay video is one of the selectable songs for the stage Mario Circuit. This track is once again a selectable for the stage "Mario Circuit (Brawl)" in Super Smash Bros. for Wii U. The track once again appears in Super Smash Bros. Ultimate, this time playing on any miscellaneous Nintendo series stage.

Many elements from Excite Truck have been implemented into later Excite titles. Excitebots: Trick Racing, which is the sequel to Excite Truck, was released in North America on April 20, 2009, and shared most of the same game mechanics, including controls and core gameplay engine. The WiiWare title Excitebike: World Rally, also retained the ability to change terrain, color options for the vehicle, and the ranking system. Also, some tracks have backgrounds that are designed similar to Excite Truck.
