= Excitebots: Trick Racing =

2009 video game

- North American box art
- Developer: Monster Games
- Publisher: Nintendo
- Director: Richard Garcia
- Producers: Kensuke Tanabe; Keisuke Terasaki
- Designer: John Schneider
- Programmers: Dave Broske; Dave Pollatsek
- Composers: Kenji Yamamoto; Masaru Tajima; Shinji Ushiroda
- Series: Excite
- Platform: Wii
- Release: NA: April 20, 2009; JP: August 30, 2011
- Genre: Racing
- Modes: Single-player, multiplayer

Excitebots: Trick Racing, known in Japan as Excite Mou Machine, (Note: Japanese: エキサイト猛マシン) is a 2009 racing video game developed by Monster Games and published by Nintendo for the Wii. Released on April 20, 2009, it is the fourth game in the Excite series and the sequel to Excite Truck (2006). It features animal-themed robot vehicles and short minigames during racing, such as pie throwing, bowling, and soccer. The game could be bought packaged with or without the Wii Wheel, similar to Mario Kart Wii.

Despite a positive reception from critics, Excitebots was never made available in stores outside North America. Nintendo Australia's Managing Director, Rose Lappin, stated that Excitebots would not be released in Australia "due to lack of interest". The game was later also released in August 2011 in Japan, but only through Club Nintendo. A fifth game in the series, Excitebike: World Rally, was released in 2009 for WiiWare.

== Gameplay ==
Excitebots featured six-player online multiplayer. In this screen-shot, the track being raced on is "Bronze Mexico" and the "Hummingbird" bot is selected.

Excitebots is controlled with the Wii Remote horizontally, optionally with the Wii Wheel. Most of the games are played on courses large in size with many opportunities to take meandering paths. The 25 different courses offered are modeled after real locations on Earth. Because of the size of each course, most races are two laps long and offer opportunities to gain massive altitude, perform various maneuvers, and obtain various items.

Each race is scored on a grading system from "D" (lowest) to "S" (highest). In order to obtain a higher score, players must perform various tricks, stunts, complete minigames, and finish the race before the other bots. Each of these tricks yields stars, which are used to determine how well the player did during the race. The more stars collected before crossing the finish line, the higher the final score will be. Examples of some of the methods to obtain stars are: gaining extreme altitude from jumping off inclined terrain, smashing into other bots during high speed, altering the terrain ahead and sending leading bots skyward, ramming into bowling pins, getting various offensive items and using them strategically i.e. bombs, hammers, and swinging on bars including a mandatory "red bar" in each course.

=== Multiplayer ===
Excitebots featured six-player online multiplayer via the Nintendo Wi-Fi Connection as well as local, split-screen 2-player racing. Online gameplay modes included six-player "Excite" races as well as "Poker" races which could be played anonymously or with friends using Nintendo's Friend Code system. During online play, players were able to place bets on themselves with in-game tokens which could be exchanged for unlockable items. Unlike its predecessor, Excitebots did not support the ability to play custom music from an SD card.

=== Play modes ===
Excitebots features many game modes that can be played:

- Excite Race: The game's main mode of gameplay. In this mode, players race on the many tracks available for racing and attempt to get the highest score possible.
- Super Excite: A more difficult version of "Excite Race" which have a higher star requirement to pass each track. The CPU bots are more challenging and less likely to make a mistake during races. Super Excite also features a hidden course not featured in Excite Race.
- Mirror Excite: Tracks this time are mirrored and the CPU robots are even tougher than before. This mode is unlocked after gaining a perfect score on all races in Super Excite.
- Poker Race: Players collect poker cards placed on the track which are set up at certain points, and try to make the best hand before exchanging the cards for another hand all the while racing with the other bots.
- Minigames: Excitebots has 10 minigames in which players will compete several challenges, such as dart throwing, bowling, or gliding while trying to gain as much stars to achieve a higher score. This mode can be played as local multiplayer as well.

Players were also able to play with up to five other people online with the Nintendo WFC. Options existed after each race to save replays and ghosts and send them to other Wii consoles including their own and attach awards to the ghost challenges. With the discontinuation of the Nintendo WFC, playing online is no longer possible.

=== Environments ===
Excitebots features a variety of robust racing environments, including some redesigned tracks from Excite Truck. For the most part, they are based on real life locations. The only environment that is not based on a real location is "Crystal Nebula", which is located on a fictional planet and is regarded as the hardest track.

The tracks themselves also have unique features. For example, in Kilimanjaro, there are dinosaur fossils that come to life, Guatemala, the Moai statue heads can breathe fire at times, and in Tasmania, several rock monsters will alter tracks or attack players. Other locations featured include: Fiji, Canada, China, Egypt, Finland, Scotland, and Mexico. The Crystal Nebula is, as the name states, a purple nebula made of crystals.

== Reception ==
Reception

Aggregate scores
Aggregator	Score
GameRankings	80.19%
Metacritic	77/100

Review scores
Publication	Score
Edge	4/10
GamePro	7/10
GameSpot	8.0/10
IGN	8.4/10
Nintendo Life	9/10
Nintendo Power	8/10
Nintendo World Report	9/10

Excitebots has received favorable reviews from a variety of publications. IGN proclaimed the game as pure fun, and awarded it a score of 8.4 out of 10. Nintendo World Report had similar things to say about the game, calling it a "fantastic game". Nintendo Power awarded the game a score of 8 out 10. While this score was slightly lower than that previously awarded to Excite Truck (8.5/10), they considered the game an improvement over the latter, the reason for the lower score being that they had to account for Mario Kart Wii and other racing games made since Excite Truck. StageSelect.com awarded Excitebots a 7 out of 10 and said that "twitchy controls don't harm the fun".
