= List of Game & Watch games =

This is a list of Game & Watch games released by Nintendo. Several were collected and remade as part for the Game & Watch Gallery series for Game Boy, Game Boy Color, and Game Boy Advance. They were re-released in the Nintendo Mini Classics series in the late 1990s. Digital recreations in DSiWare were released for Nintendo DSi in 2009 (2010 internationally) and for Nintendo 3DS in 2011.

== Overview ==
Title	Release	Sales	Series	Model	Controls		Image
Ball (NA: Toss-Up)	28 Apr 1980	<250,000	Silver	AC-01			
Flagman (NA: Flag Man)	5 Jun 1980	<250,000	Silver	FL-02			
Vermin (NA: The Exterminator)	10 Jul 1980	>1,000,000	Silver	MT-03			
Fire (NA: Fireman Fireman)	31 Jul 1980	250,000–1,000,000	Silver	RC-04			
Judge	4 Oct 1980	<250,000	Silver	IP-05			
Manhole	29 Jan 1981	>1,000,000	Gold	MH-06			
Helmet (UK: Headache)	21 Feb 1981	>1,000,000	Gold	CN-07			
Lion	29 Apr 1981	<250,000	Gold	LN-08			
Parachute	19 Jun 1981	250,000–1,000,000	Wide Screen	PR-21			
Octopus	16 Jul 1981	250,000–1,000,000	Wide Screen	OC-22			
Popeye	5 Aug 1981	250,000–1,000,000	Wide Screen	PP-23			
Chef	8 Sep 1981	>1,000,000	Wide Screen	FP-24			
Mickey Mouse	9 Oct 1981	250,000–1,000,000	Wide Screen	MC-25			
Egg	14 Oct 1981	<250,000	Wide Screen	EG-26			
Fire	4 Dec 1981	250,000–1,000,000	Wide Screen	FR-27			
Turtle Bridge	1 Feb 1982	>1,000,000	Wide Screen	TL-28			
Fire Attack	26 Mar 1982	>1,000,000	Wide Screen	ID-29			
Snoopy Tennis	28 Apr 1982	250,000–1,000,000	Wide Screen	SP-30			
Oil Panic	28 May 1982	250,000–1,000,000	Vertical Multi Screen	OP-51			
Donkey Kong	3 Jun 1982	8,000,000	Vertical Multi Screen	DK-52			
Mickey & Donald	12 Nov 1982	250,000–1,000,000	Vertical Multi Screen	DM-53			
Green House	6 Dec 1982	250,000–1,000,000	Vertical Multi Screen	GH-54			
Donkey Kong II	7 Mar 1983	250,000–1,000,000	Vertical Multi Screen	JR-55			
Pinball	5 Dec 1983	<250,000	Vertical Multi Screen	PB-59			
Black Jack	15 Feb 1985	<250,000	Vertical Multi Screen	BJ-60			
Squish	17 Apr 1986	<250,000	Vertical Multi Screen	MG-61			
Bomb Sweeper	15 Jun 1987	<250,000	Vertical Multi Screen	BD-62			
Safebuster	12 Jan 1988	>1,000,000	Vertical Multi Screen	JB-63			
Gold Cliff	19 Oct 1988	<250,000	Vertical Multi Screen	MV-64			
Zelda	26 Aug 1989	<250,000	Vertical Multi Screen	ZL-65			
Tetris Jr.	Never released, only prototypes.		Vertical Multi Screen	TR-66			
Mario Bros.	14 Mar 1983	250,000–1,000,000	Horizontal Multi Screen	MW-56			
Rain Shower	9 Aug 1983	<250,000	Horizontal Multi Screen	LP-57			
Lifeboat	27 Oct 1983	>1,000,000	Horizontal Multi Screen	TC-58			
Donkey Kong Jr.	26 Oct 1982	250,000–1,000,000	New Wide Screen	DJ-101			
Mario's Cement Factory	8 Jun 1983	>1,000,000	New Wide Screen	ML-102			
Manhole	23 Aug 1983	<250,000	New Wide Screen	NH-103			
Tropical Fish	8 Jul 1985	<250,000	New Wide Screen	TF-104			
Super Mario Bros.	8 Mar 1988	250,000–1,000,000	New Wide Screen	YM-105			
Climber	8 Mar 1988	<250,000	New Wide Screen	DR-106			
Balloon Fight	8 Mar 1988	<250,000	New Wide Screen	BF-107			
Mario the Juggler	14 Oct 1991	<250,000	New Wide Screen	MB-108			
Donkey Kong Jr.	28 Apr 1983	<250,000	Table Top	CJ-71			
Mario's Cement Factory	28 Apr 1983	<250,000	Table Top	CM-72			
Snoopy	5 Jul 1983	<250,000	Table Top	SM-73			
Popeye	17 Aug 1983	<250,000	Table Top	PG-74			
Snoopy	30 Aug 1983	<250,000	Panorama Screen	SM-91			
Popeye	30 Aug 1983	<250,000	Panorama Screen	PG-92			
Donkey Kong Jr.	4 Oct 1983	<250,000	Panorama Screen	CJ-93			
Mario's Bombs Away	4 Nov 1983	<250,000	Panorama Screen	TB-94			
Mickey Mouse	28 Feb 1984	<250,000	Panorama Screen	DC-95			
Donkey Kong Circus	2 Mar 1984	<250,000	Panorama Screen	MK-96			
Spitball Sparky	6 Feb 1984	<250,000	Super Color	BU-201			
Crab Grab	20 Feb 1984	<250,000	Super Color	UD-202			
Boxing; Punch Out (NA)	31 Jul 1984	<250,000	Micro VS. System	BX-301	× 2	× 2	
Donkey Kong 3	20 Aug 1984	<250,000	Micro VS. System	AK-302	× 2	× 2	
Donkey Kong Hockey	13 Nov 1984	<250,000	Micro VS. System	HK-303	× 2	× 2	
Super Mario Bros.	25 Jun 1986	<250,000	Crystal Screen	YM-801			
Climber	4 Jul 1986	<250,000	Crystal Screen	DR-802			
Balloon Fight	19 Nov 1986	<250,000	Crystal Screen	BF-803			
Super Mario Bros.	1 Aug 1987	10,000	Diskun Special Edition	YM-901-S			

=== Remasters (2010–2021) ===
Title	Release	Sales	Series	Model	Controls	Image
Ball	1 Apr 2010		Reissue	RGW-001		
Game & Watch: Super Mario Bros.	13 Nov 2020		35th Anniversary Edition	SM-35		
Game & Watch: The Legend of Zelda	12 Nov 2021		35th Anniversary Edition	ZL-35		

== Games ==
=== Ball ===
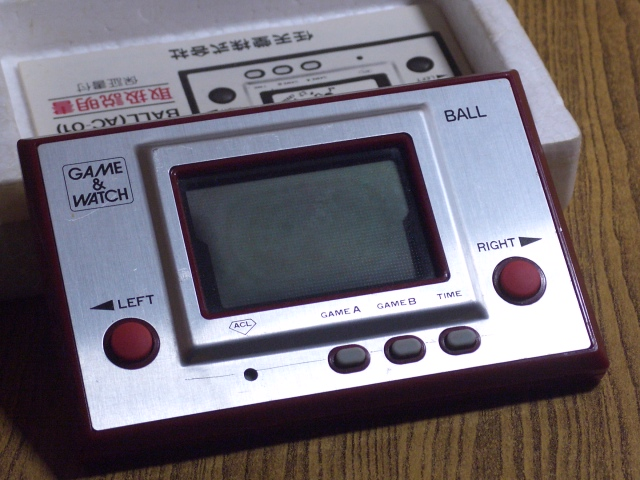
Ball (original version)

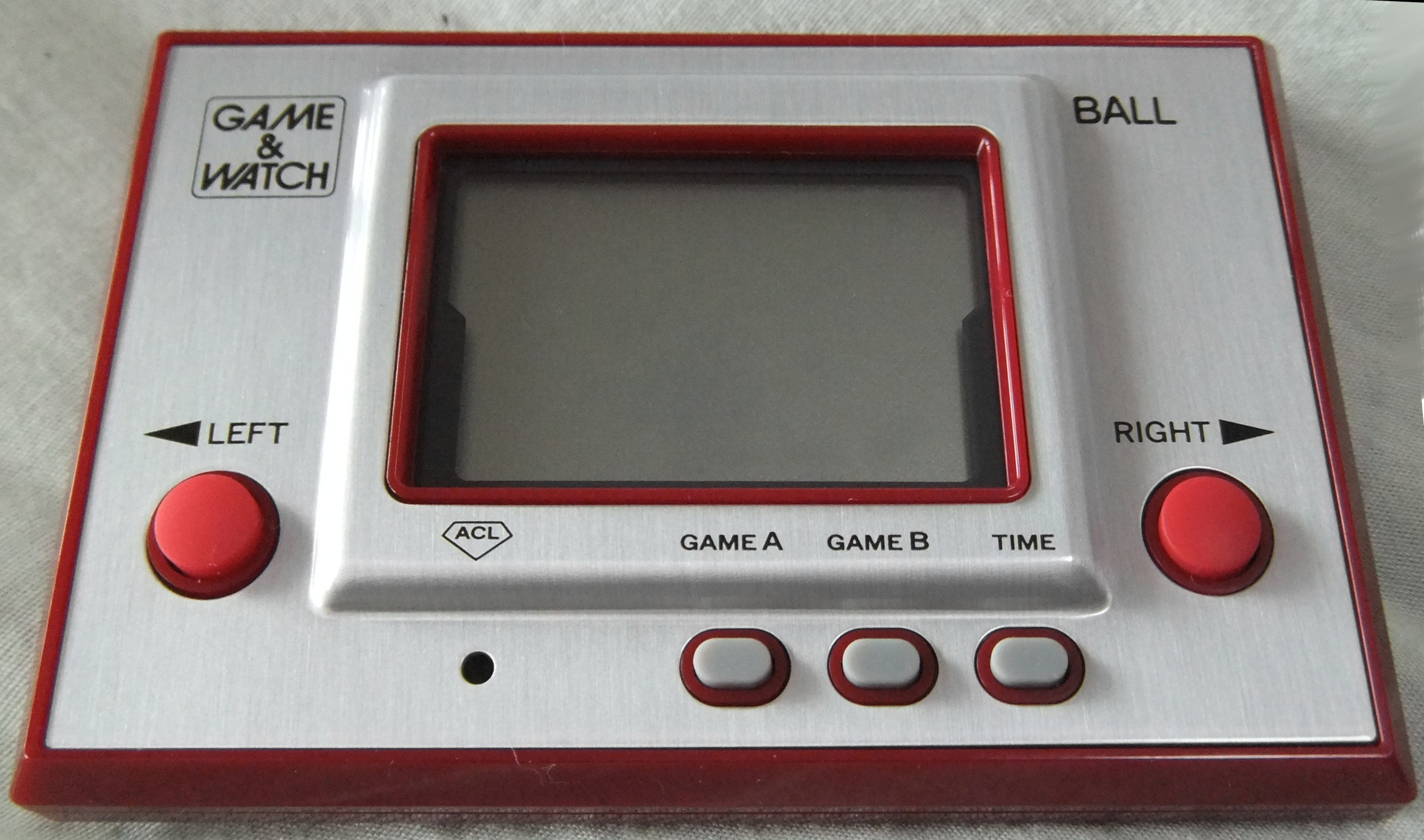
Ball (Club Nintendo reissued version)

Ball (originally released as Toss-Up in North America) was released in the Silver series on April 28, 1980. It is the first Game & Watch game and is a single-screen single-player game.

In Game A, the player tosses two balls in the air. As the balls fall, the player must catch and toss them up again. One point is earned for each successful catch. A dropped ball will display a broken ball and end the game. The object is to continuously catch the balls that fall and throw them back up, as in juggling. In Game B, the player must juggle three balls, and each successful catch rewards ten points instead of one.

It was re-released exclusively via Club Nintendo to celebrate the 30th anniversary of Game & Watch, with the Club Nintendo logo on the back. Unlike the original release, this version includes an option to mute the game by pressing the Time button during gameplay. For members of the Japanese Club Nintendo, it was shipped in April 2010 to Platinum members. For members of the North American Club Nintendo, it was available for 1200 coins from February 2011. For members of the European Club Nintendo, it was available for 7500 stars from November 2011.

Ball was recreated in Game Boy Gallery for Game Boy and Game & Watch Gallery 2 for Game Boy Color. It was recreated as a DSiWare game that was released for Nintendo DSi on July 15, 2009 in Japan, on April 19, 2010 in the United States and on April 23 in Europe; and for Nintendo 3DS on July 7, 2011 in Europe. It also appears as a minigame for the Game Boy Camera, where players can paste images of their own face over that of the juggler. It is also included in Game & Watch: Super Mario Bros., released in 2020 as a part of the Super Mario Bros. 35th Anniversary.

In the Super Smash Bros. series, Mr. Game & Watch's throws reference Ball.

=== Flagman ===
Flagman (known as Flag Man in North America) was released in the Silver series on June 5, 1980. It is a single-screen single-player game.

The object is to repeat the pattern of numbers on the flags held up by the on-screen character Mr. Game & Watch. A life is lost each time the player pushes the wrong button or hits the correct number too late. The game ends when three lives are lost. Game B requires the character to push the right number as quickly as possible, before time runs out.

Flagman was recreated in Game Boy Gallery for Game Boy and Game & Watch Gallery 3 for Game Boy Color. A version of Flagman becomes available in Wario Land II once the player has achieved 100% completion of the game. It is included in WarioWare: Touched! as a microgame called Flagman Game & Watch. It was recreated as a DSiWare game that was released for Nintendo DSi on July 15, 2009 in Japan, on April 19, 2010 in the United States and on April 23 in Europe; and for Nintendo 3DS on July 7, 2011 in Europe.

In the Super Smash Bros. series, Mr. Game & Watch has an attack which has him hit opponents with a flag, referencing Flagman.

=== Vermin ===
Vermin (originally released as The Exterminator in North America) was released in the Silver series on July 10, 1980 with 500,000 units sold. It is a single-screen single-player game.

In Vermin, moles pop out of the ground and try to get into the player's garden. The player has to hit the moles with a hammer to keep them out of the garden.

Vermin was recreated in Game Boy Gallery for Game Boy and Game & Watch Gallery 2 for Game Boy Color. In WarioWare, Inc.: Mega Microgames!, there is a microgame called "Vermin" in which Wario has to whack a mole with a hammer. It was recreated as a DSiWare game that was released for Nintendo DSi on July 15, 2009 in Japan, on April 5, 2010 in the United States and on April 9 in Europe; and for Nintendo 3DS on July 7, 2011 in Europe. A Legend of Zelda-themed version is included in the Game & Watch: The Legend of Zelda edition as part of The Legend of Zelda 35th Anniversary.

In the Super Smash Bros. series, Mr. Game & Watch has several attacks which has him hit opponents on either side with two hammers, referencing Vermin.

=== Fire ===
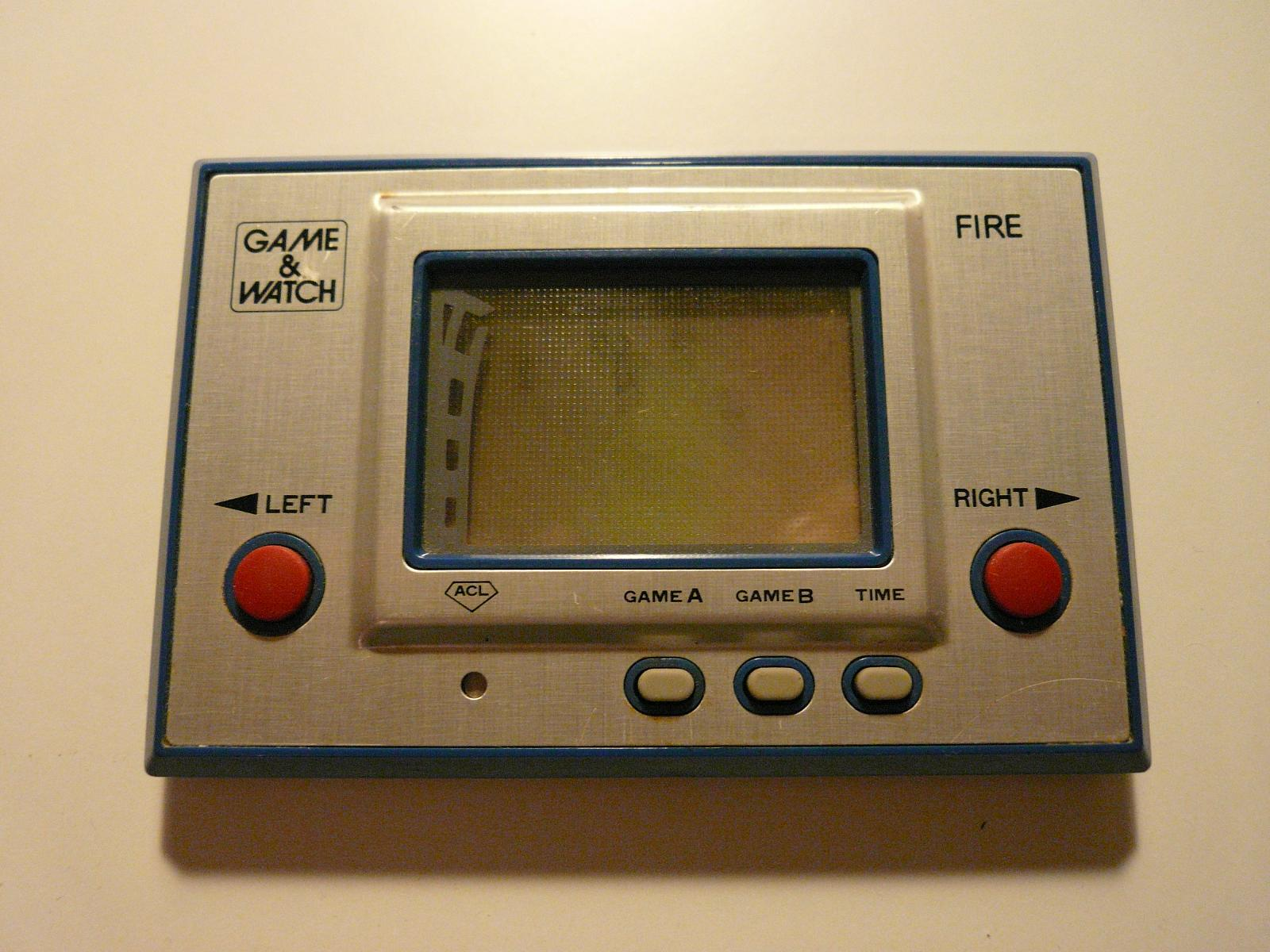
Fire (original version)

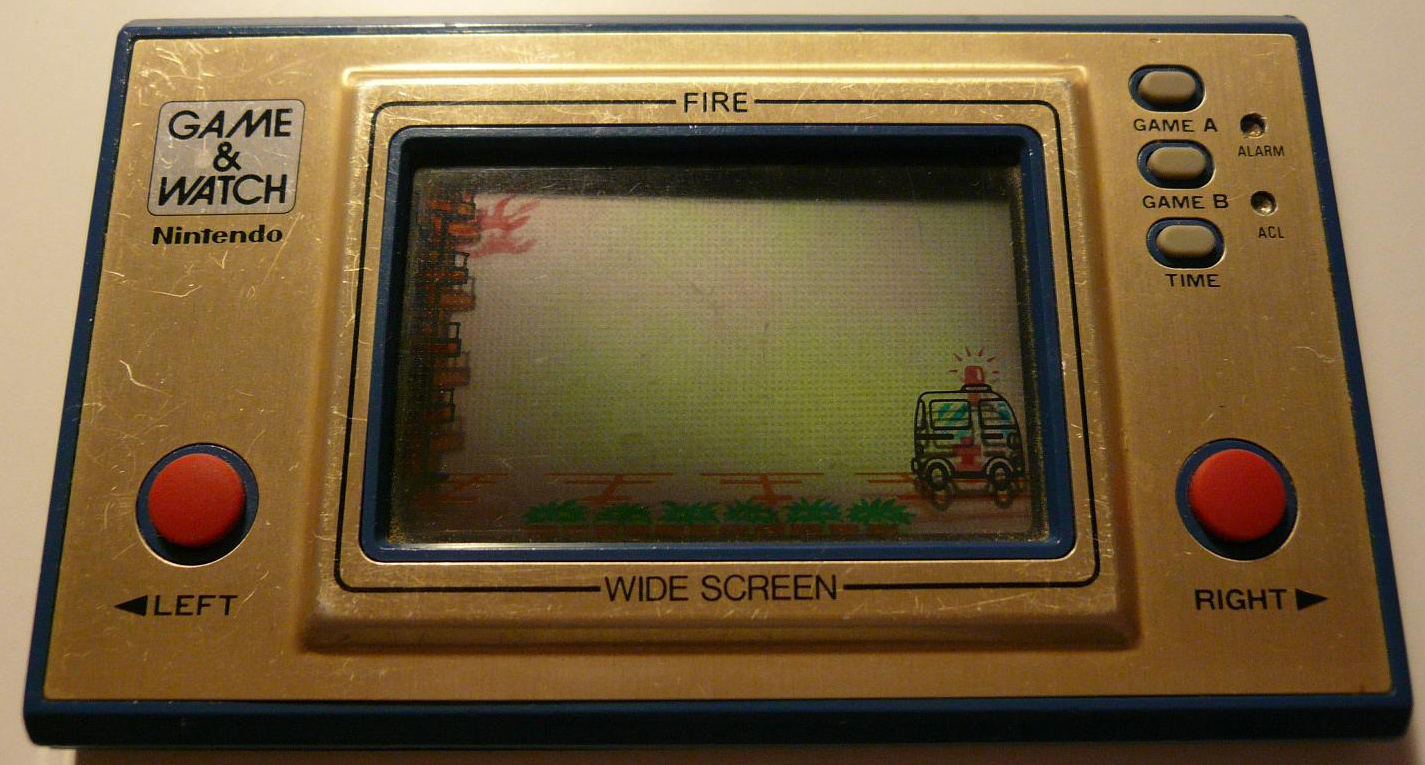
Fire (Wide Screen version)

Fire (originally released as Fireman Fireman in North America) was released in the Silver series on July 31, 1980, and in the Wide Screen series on December 4, 1981. It is a single-screen single-player game.

The player controls two firemen who carry a trampoline and must catch people who fall from a burning building and bounce them into a waiting ambulance. In the original Silver series, the player is awarded 1 point for each person who reaches the ambulances, while in the Widescreen, the player is awarded 1 point every time a person is bounced the trampoline, and loses one of their three lives for each person who hits the ground.

Fire was recreated in Game & Watch Gallery for Game Boy, Game & Watch Gallery 3 for Game Boy Color and Game & Watch Gallery 4 for Game Boy Advance. It was also rereleased in the Mini Classics series.

In the Super Smash Bros. series, Mr. Game & Watch has a move called "Fire", which has two firemen launch him upwards with a trampoline, referencing Fire. In Brawl and 3DS and Wii U, he then floats down with a parachute, referencing Parachute. Both in Brawl and 3DS and Wii U, the stage Flat Zone 2 shifts between several layouts, one of which is based on Fire. In Super Smash Bros. for Wii U, the stage Flat Zone X shifts between several layouts, one of which is based on Fire.

=== Judge ===
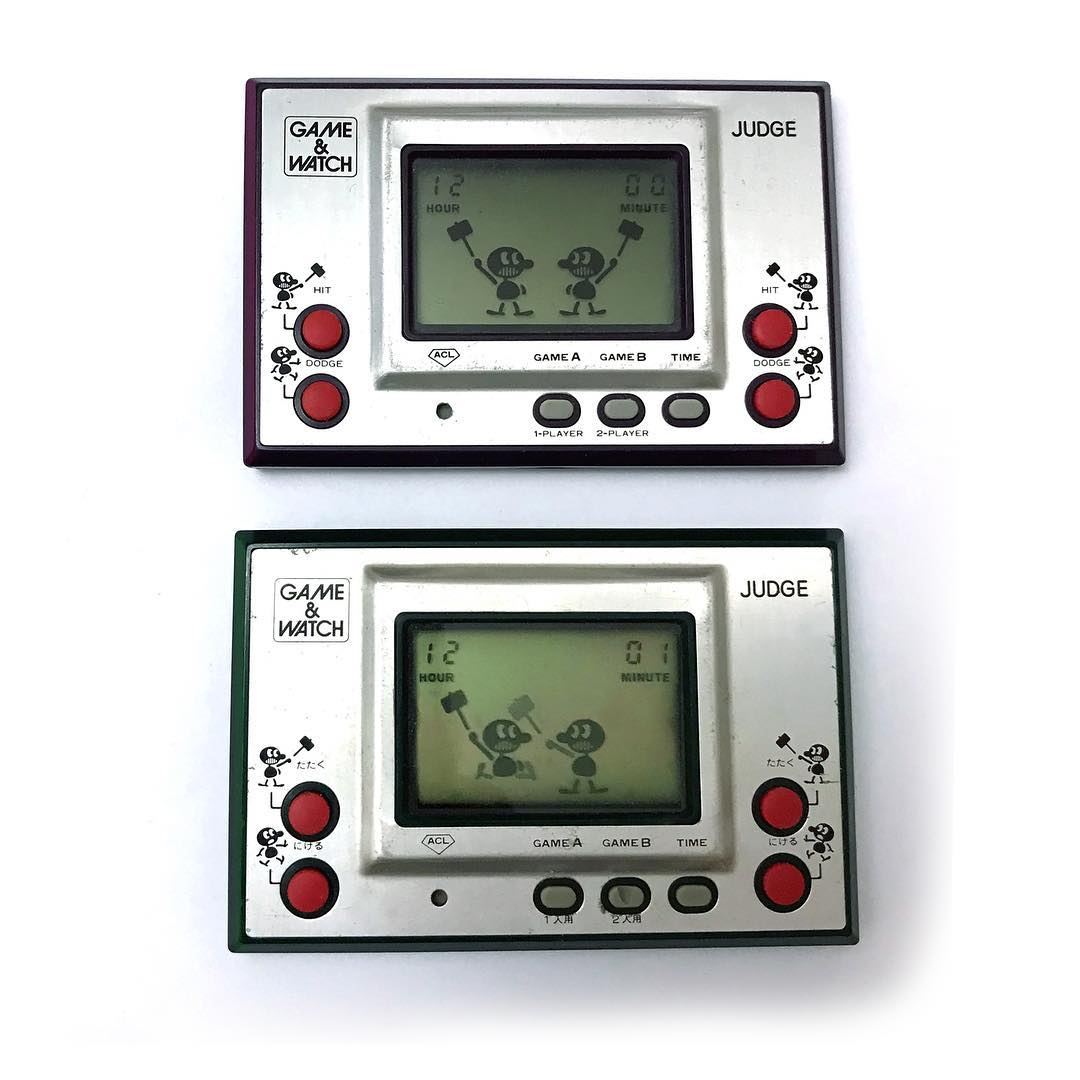
Game & Watch game Judge. Green and Purple versions.

Judge was released in the Silver series on October 4, 1980. It is a single-screen game for either 1 or 2 players.

Players control two figures who hold hammers in their hands and hold up numbers. The one with the higher number must attack, and the one with the lower number must flee. An attack may be performed before the number is held up, as a gamble.

Judge was recreated in Game & Watch Gallery 3 for Game Boy Color. It was recreated as a DSiWare game that was released on July 15, 2009 in Japan, on March 22, 2010 in the United States and on March 26 in Europe; and for Nintendo 3DS on July 7, 2011 in Europe.

In the Super Smash Bros. series, Mr. Game & Watch has a move called "Judge", which has him hit opponents with a hammer that has an additional effect dependent on a random number from 1 to 9 that appears above his head, referencing Judge.

=== Manhole ===
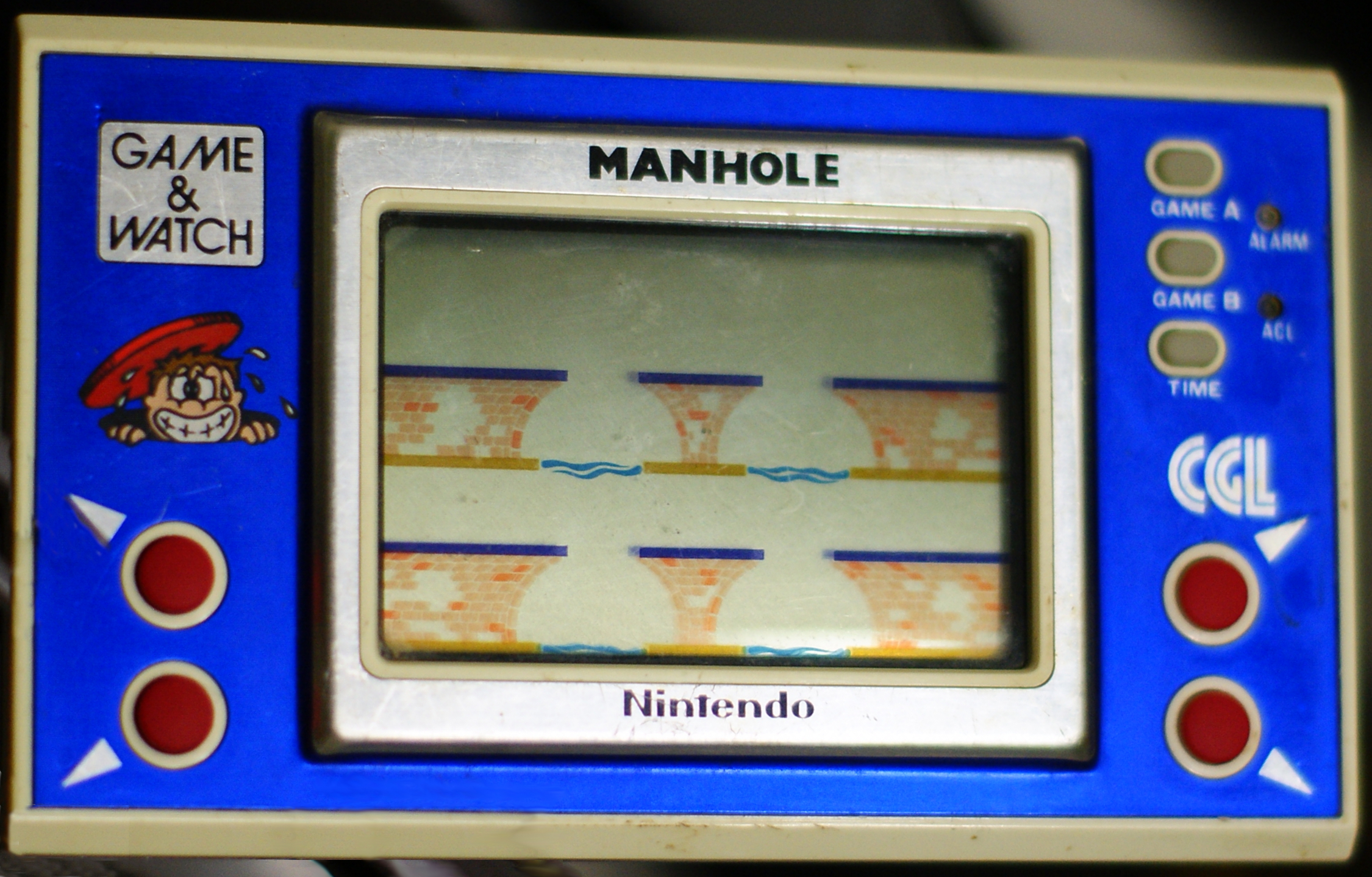
Manhole (New Wide Screen)

Manhole was released in the Gold series on January 29, 1981, and in the New Wide Screen series on August 23, 1983. It is the first game in the Gold series and is a single-screen single-player game.

The player must prevent pedestrians from falling into one of four sewers by temporarily bridging the open gaps with a manhole cover.

The New Wide Screen version of Manhole was recreated in Game Boy Gallery and Game & Watch Gallery for Game Boy and Game & Watch Gallery 4 for Game Boy Advance. This version of Manhole was one of the cards included with purchase of the Nintendo e-Reader. The New Wide Screen version of Manhole was recreated as a DSiWare game that was released on August 19, 2009 in Japan, on April 5, 2010 in the United States and on April 9 in Europe; and for Nintendo 3DS on July 7, 2011 in Europe.

In WarioWare Gold, Manhole is one of the unlockable minigames.

In the Super Smash Bros. series, Mr. Game & Watch has an attack which has him hit opponents with a manhole cover, referencing Manhole. In Melee, the stage Flat Zone is based on a number of Game & Watch games, including Manhole. In Brawl and Super Smash Bros. for Nintendo 3DS, the stage Flat Zone 2 shifts between several layouts, one of which is based on Manhole. In Super Smash Bros. for Wii U, the stage Flat Zone X shifts between several layouts, one of which is based on Manhole.

=== Helmet ===
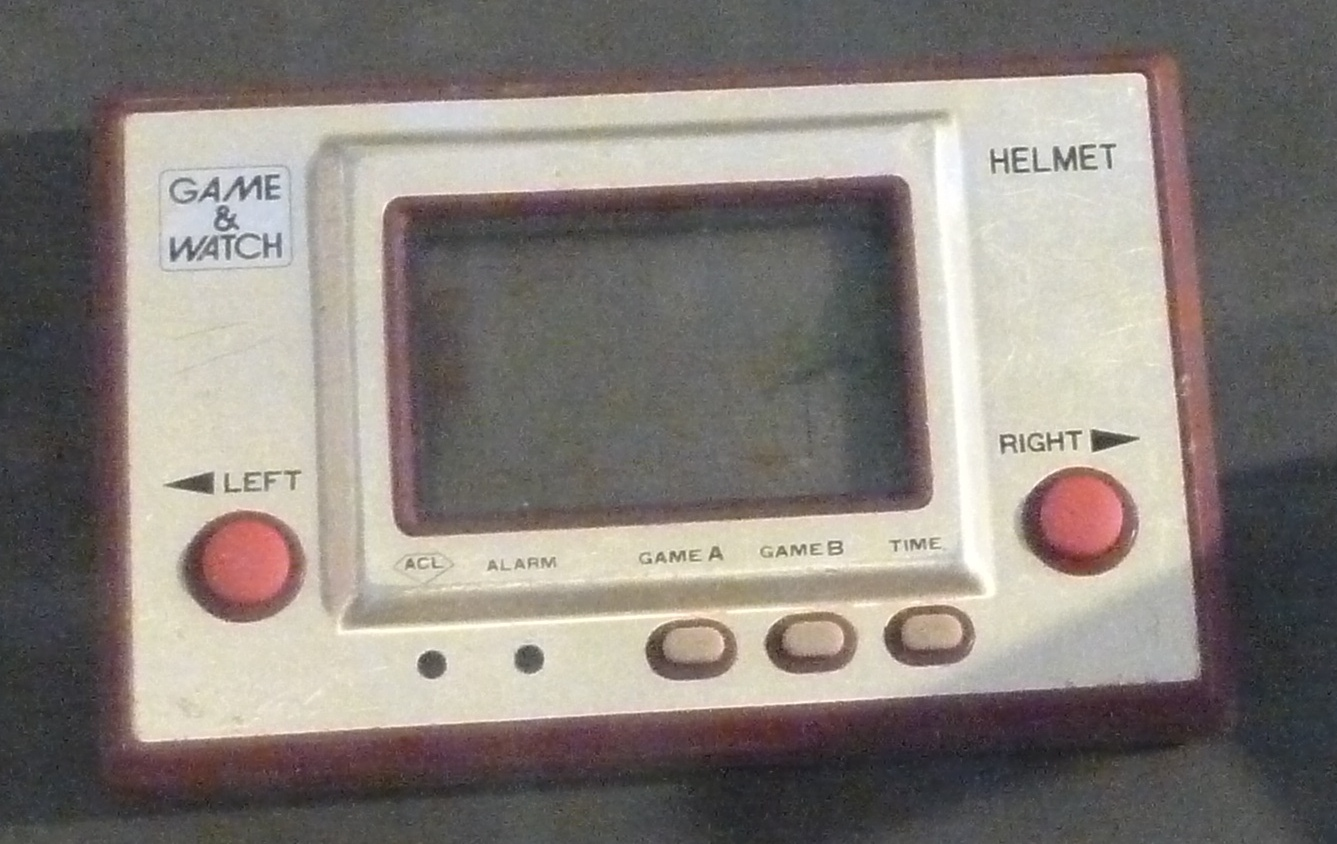
Helmet

Helmet, originally released as Headache in the United Kingdom, was released in the Gold series on February 21, 1981. It is a single-screen single-player game.

Tools fall from the sky, but there is a house on the right side of the screen. The player must guide the character towards the house, and dodge the tools until the door opens.

Helmet was recreated in Game & Watch Gallery 2 for Game Boy Color. It was recreated as a DSiWare game that was released for Nintendo DSi on July 29, 2009 in Japan, on April 5, 2010 in the United States and on April 9 in Europe; and for 3DS on July 7, 2011 in Europe.

In the Super Smash Bros. series, Mr. Game & Watch has an attack which has him hit opponents with a helmet, referencing Helmet. In Melee, the stage Flat Zone is based on a number of Game & Watch games, including Helmet. In Super Smash Bros. for Wii U, the stage Flat Zone X shifts between several layouts, one of which is based on Helmet.

=== Lion ===
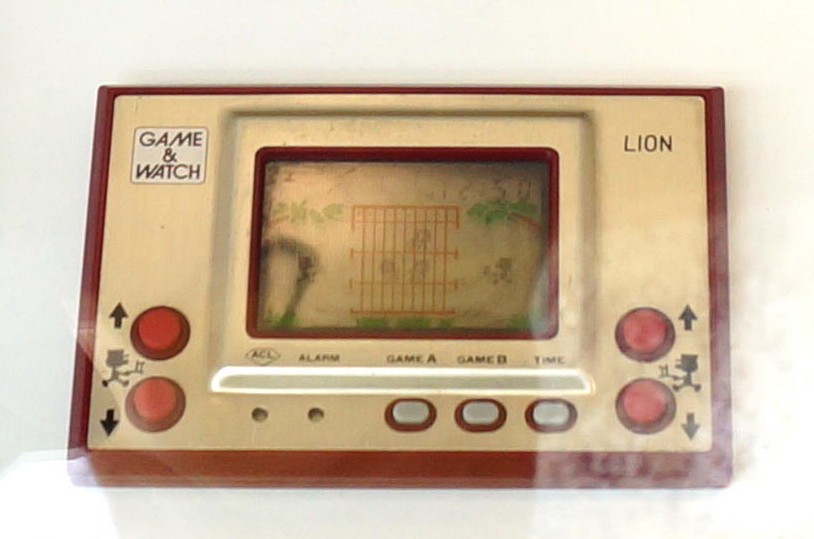
Lion

Lion was released in the Gold series on April 29, 1981. It is a single-screen single-player game with a maroon body and a gold faceplate.

The player is a lion tamer who must prevent the lion from escaping from its cage.

Lion was ported to Game & Watch Gallery 3 for Game Boy Color.

In the Super Smash Bros. series, Mr. Game & Watch has an attack which has him hit opponents with a chair, referencing Lion. In Brawl and Super Smash Bros. for Nintendo 3DS, the stage Flat Zone 2 shifts between several layouts, one of which is based on Lion. In Super Smash Bros. for Wii U and Ultimate, the stage Flat Zone X shifts between several layouts, one of which is based on Lion.

=== Parachute ===
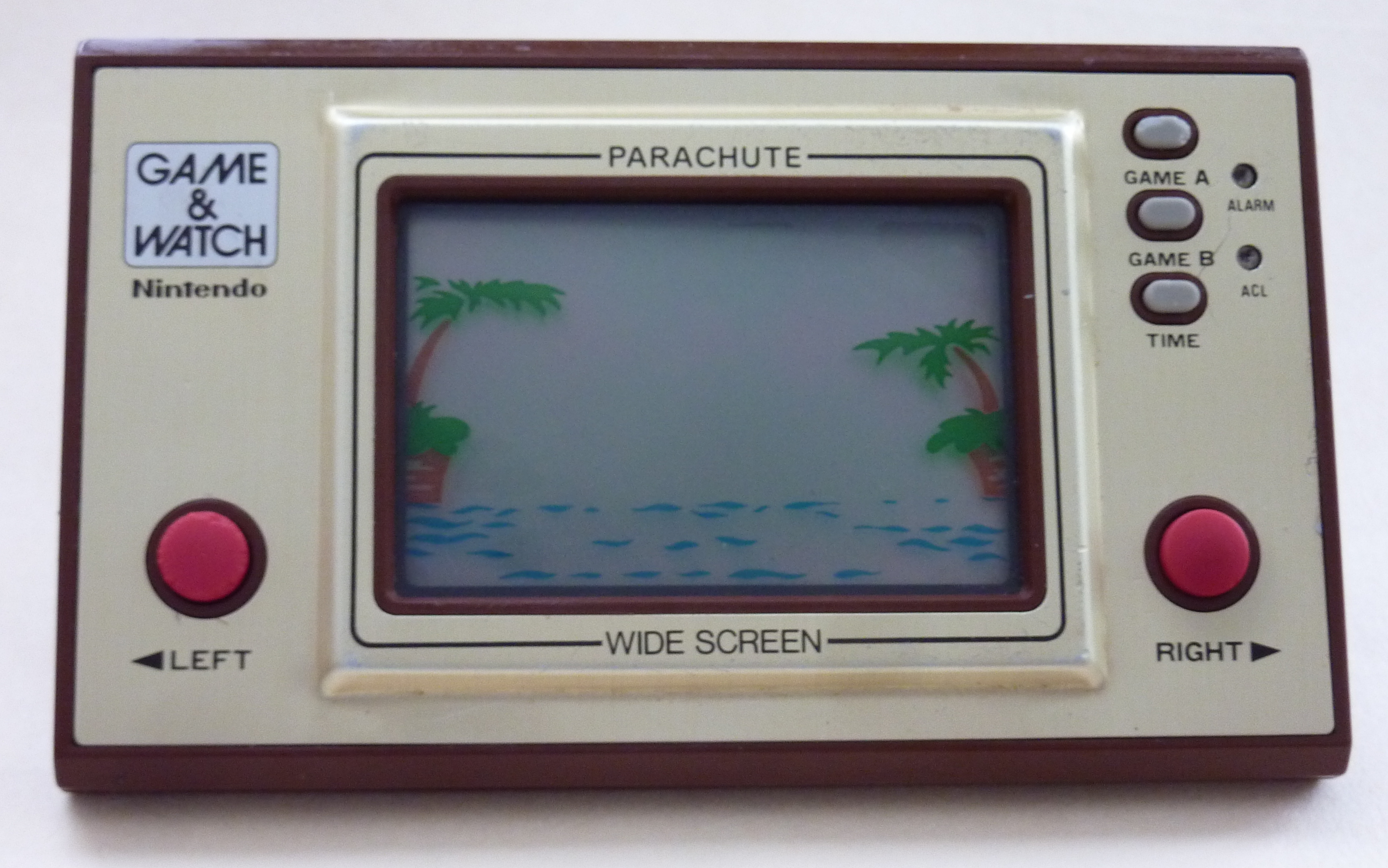
Parachute

Parachute was released in the Wide Screen series on June 19, 1981. It is the first game in the Wide Screen series and is a single-screen single-player game.

The player controls a character in a boat and has to prevent parachutists from landing in shark-infested waters. A life is lost every time the player fails to do this. In Game B, the parachutes can get stuck in trees.

Parachute was recreated in Game & Watch Gallery 2 for Game Boy Color, Game & Watch Gallery 4 for Game Boy Advance, and Game & Watch Collection 2 for the Nintendo DS (a Club Nintendo-exclusive).

In Super Smash Bros. Melee, Mr. Game & Watch's neutral air has him opening a parachute, referencing Parachute. In Brawl onward, after performing "Fire" in the same way as in Melee, he then floats down with a parachute, referencing Parachute.

In March 2010, Takara Tomy released officially licensed Game & Watch-styled keychains based on three different Wide Screen Game & Watch models, one of which was Parachute. It does not actually run the game, instead just displaying a demo screen. While the game cannot be played, the speed at which the demo runs can be adjusted. The batteries are recharged with solar panels on the unit.

=== Octopus ===
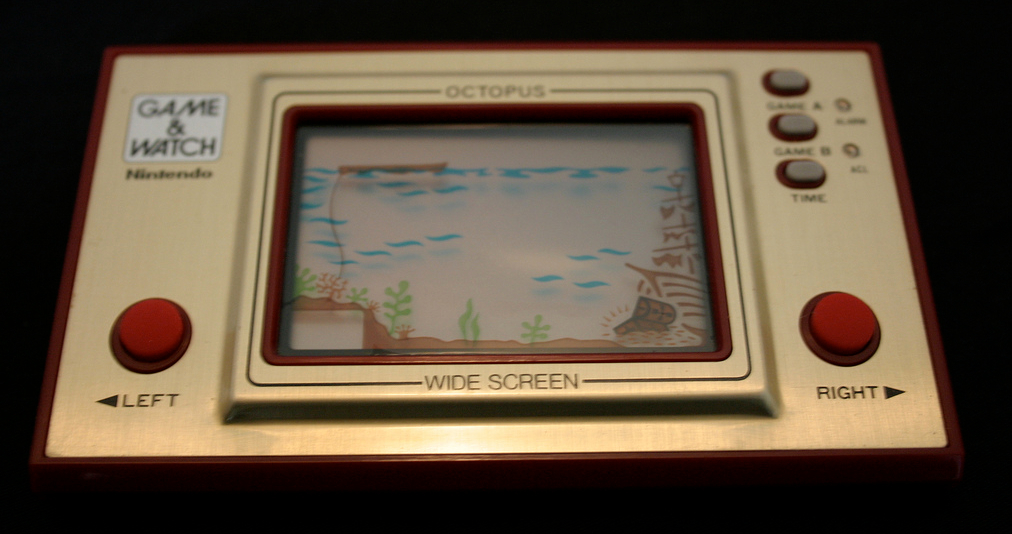
Octopus

Octopus, known as Mysteries of the Sea in the United Kingdom and Mysteries of the Ocean in Russia, was released in the Wide Screen series on July 16, 1981. It is a single-screen single-player game.

The object is to recover treasure from a sunken ship without getting caught by a giant octopus. The player must aim their diver under water by jumping off the side of a boat. Each time the octopus touches the player, one life is lost. A point is awarded for each portion of treasure retrieved from a sunken ship, and three additional points are awarded for evading the octopus a second time and returning to the boat. The game speeds as it progresses, and additional lives are granted at 200 and 500 points. In Game B, the octopus is quicker and there are more hazards.

Octopus was recreated in Game & Watch Gallery for Game Boy, Game & Watch Gallery 4 for Game Boy Advance and Game & Watch Collection 2 for the Nintendo DS (a Club Nintendo-exclusive). It was also rereleased in the Mini Classics series.

In the Super Smash Bros. series, Mr. Game & Watch up smash has him hit opponents with a diving helmet, referencing Octopus. In Brawl, 3DS and Wii U and Ultimate Mr. Game & Watch's Final Smash is "Octopus", which has him transform into the octopus and hit opponents with his tentacles, referencing Octopus while in Ultimate he instead grabs the opponents and drags them offscreen. In Nintendo Land, the octopus and the diver appear in the Octopus Dance minigame.

In March 2010, Takara Tomy released officially licensed Game & Watch-styled keychains based on three different Wide Screen Game & Watch models, one of which was Octopus. It does not actually run the game, instead just displaying a demo screen. While the game cannot be played, the speed at which the demo runs can be adjusted. The batteries are recharged with solar panels on the unit.

=== Popeye ===
Popeye was released in the Wide Screen series on August 5, 1981, and was later released in Table Top and Panorama series in August 1983. It is a single-screen single-player game. For the 1983 version, Hirokazu Tanaka composed the music.

The player controls Popeye, who has to catch objects thrown by Olive Oyl while at the same time avoiding Bluto's attacks. If Popeye is upright in the center of the boat, he is safe from Bluto's attacks, but he may miss objects thrown by Olive Oyl. The game speeds up as it progresses, and Olive Oyl will start throwing more than one objects at the same time.

The Panorama Screen and the Table Top versions are different from the Wide Screen version. In these versions, Popeye must fight to save Olive Oyl, who has been captured by Bluto. Each time Popeye defeats Bluto, a Spinach Can will appear near Olive Oyl. After three fights, She kicks the can to Popeye to help him defeat Bluto, and save her.

=== Chef ===
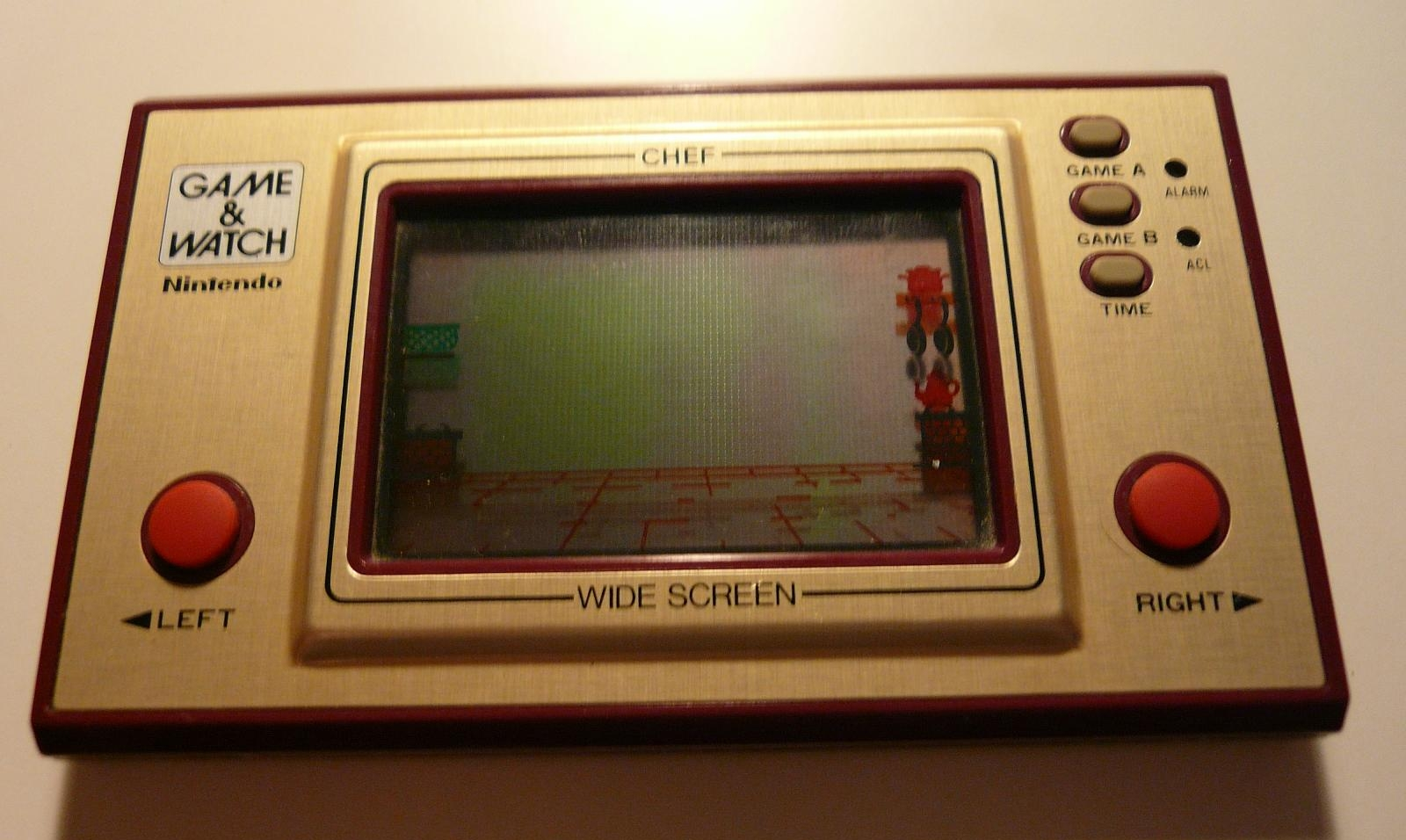
Chef

Chef was released in the Wide Screen series on September 8, 1981. It is a single-screen single-player game.

The player controls a chef who flips various pieces of food, including sausage and fish, into the air with a pan. Failure to keep the food airborne causes a mouse to steal the food off the floor and the player to use up one miss. The game ends with the player's third miss. A cat often pokes the left piece of food, which holds it in place for a small amount of time and makes it harder for the player to guess when the piece will be flippable. The game speeds up as it progresses. In Game A, the player must flip three items of food. In Game B, the player must flip four food items.

Chef was recreated in Game & Watch Gallery 2 for Game Boy Color, and Game & Watch Gallery 4 for Game Boy Advance. It is unlockable in Personal Trainer: Cooking for the Nintendo DS after the player has cooked a certain number of meals. It was recreated as a DSiWare game that was released on July 29, 2009 in Japan, on March 22, 2010 in the United States, and on March 26 in Europe; and for Nintendo 3DS on July 7, 2011 in Europe.

In the Super Smash Bros. series, Mr. Game & Watch has a move called "Chef", which has him flip food out of pan, referencing Chef. In Brawl and Super Smash Bros. for Nintendo 3DS, the stage Flat Zone 2 shifts between several layouts, one of which is based on Chef. In Super Smash Bros. for Wii U, the stage Flat Zone X shifts between several layouts, one of which is based on Chef.

In March 2010, Takara Tomy released officially licensed Game & Watch-styled keychains based on three different Wide Screen models, one of which is Chef. It only displays a non-playable demo screen with adjustable speed. Its solar panel recharges its batteries. An unofficial fan remake of the game, Modern Modern Chef, was released in 2024.

=== Mickey Mouse ===
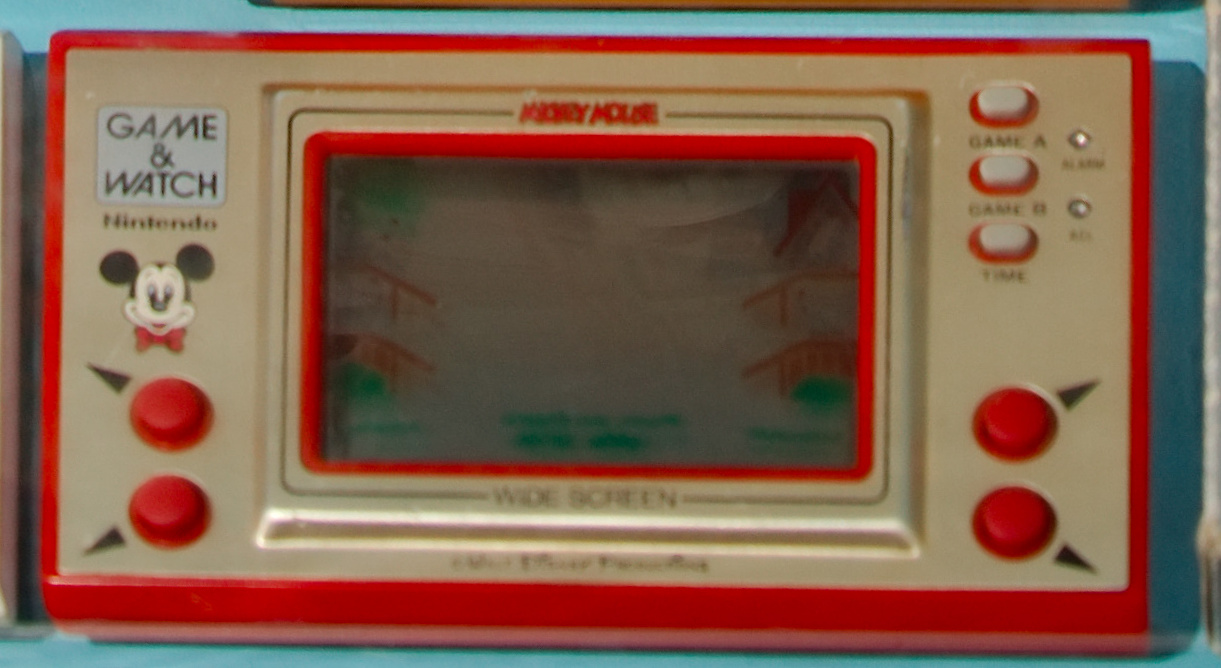
Mickey Mouse (Wide Screen)

Mickey Mouse was released in the Wide Screen series on October 9, 1981, and in the Panorama series on February 28, 1984. It is a single-screen single-player game and the first Game & Watch to feature a Disney character. There are two different versions:

In the Wide Screen version, the player controls Mickey Mouse whose task is to catch eggs as they roll down four slopes, two on either side of the screen. If an egg is dropped, it lands on the floor and is registered as a miss. The eggs roll faster as the total caught count increases, but temporarily slow down upon reaching multiples of 100. The misses are reset at 200 and 500 caught eggs. Missing three eggs between resets will end the game. Periodically, Minnie Mouse peers out of the window; if Mickey misses an egg while Minnie is present onscreen, the miss counts as half and the egg releases a chick who walks away off screen. This half-miss is displayed as a blinking miss symbol. In Game A, eggs roll from three of four slopes; the inactive slope depends on the current miss count. In Game B, eggs roll from all four slopes; the number and rate of descent of eggs is higher than in Game A. The gameplay is similar to Egg which was only released outside of Japan, while Mickey Mouse was released in Japan and a few European countries.

The Panorama version is completely different, where the player controls Mickey Mouse, who is performing acrobatics in a circus. The player must move Mickey left and right to catch batons, whilst avoiding flaming torches. The speed the objects fall increases upon the total score closing in on multiples of 100. If the player misses a baton or touches a flaming torch, a life is lost. After three lives are lost, the game ends. Once the player reaches 300 points, all misses are cancelled. If the player has no misses, they will receive double points until the next miss. The gameplay is similar to Donkey Kong Circus.

=== Egg ===
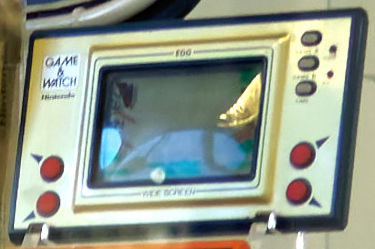
Egg

Egg was released in the Wide Screen series on October 14, 1981. It is a single-screen single-player game.

The player character is a wolf who waits outside a hen house. The wolf must catch the eggs that fall out of the side of the hen house, for one point each. Three lives are given. A life is lost for each egg missed, or half of a life if the egg is missed while a hen appears. The game ends when all three lives are lost. The gameplay is the same as Mickey Mouse in the Wide Screen series.

Egg was recreated in Game & Watch Gallery 3 for Game Boy Color.

=== Turtle Bridge ===
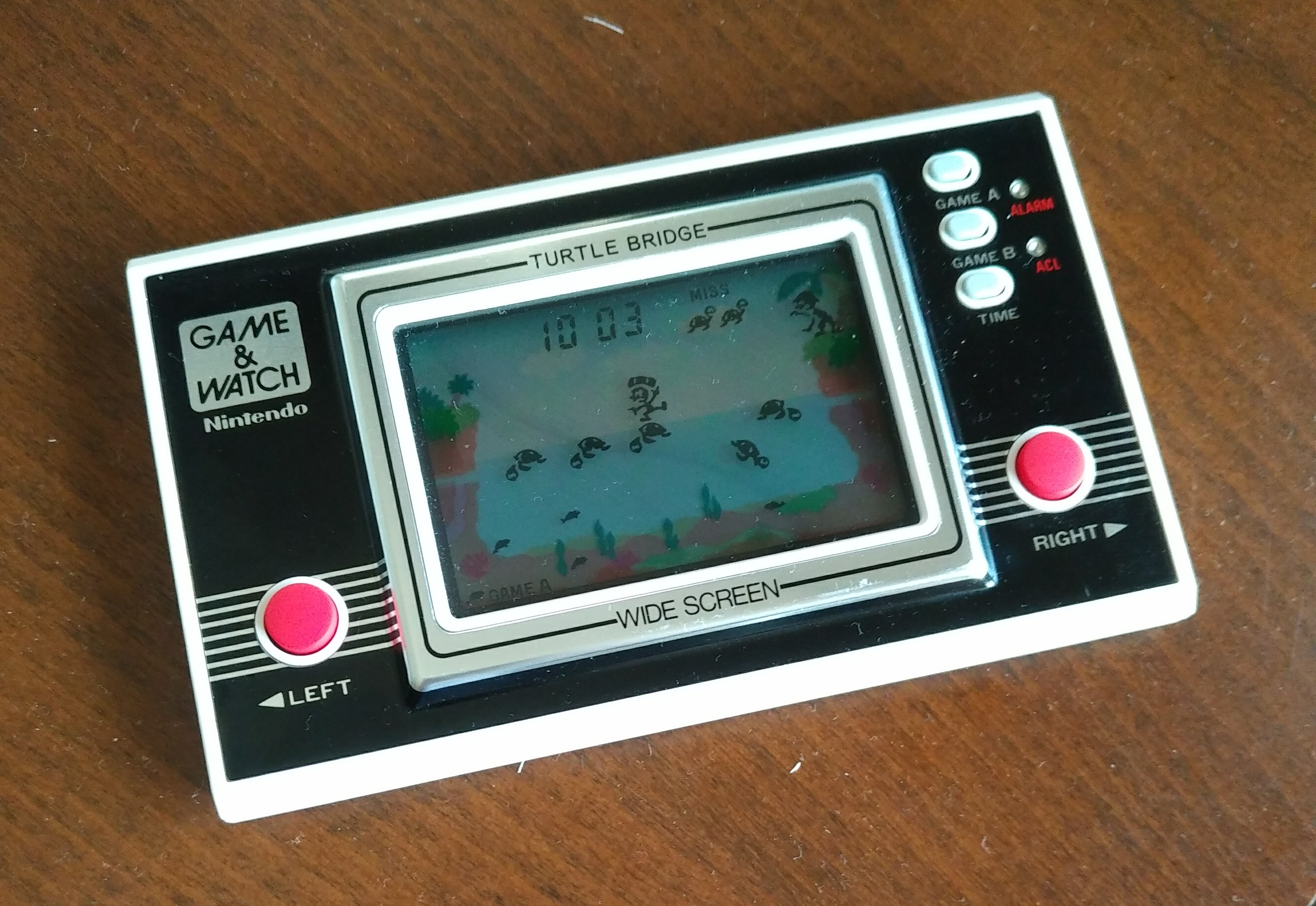
Turtle Bridge

Turtle Bridge was released in the Wide Screen series on February 1, 1982. It is a single-screen single-player game.

The player uses a line of five turtles as stepping stones to transfer baggage from one side of a river to the other. Once a package is tossed to a colleague on the other side, the player can return to the home bank to fetch the next package. The turtles are not motionless but will dive to feed on any fish within reach, and they dive more frequently as the game progresses. The player may need to wait for the colleague on the far bank and cannot return to the home bank while carrying a package. Two to twelve points are awarded, depending on how quickly the package is delivered. It takes approximately 1 hour of gameplay to accrue 1000 points. Unlike other similar games, the scoreboard can display scores past 1000. Lives are lost if the explorer lands on a turtle that dives. A life can be recovered at the score levels 200 and 500. The game ends when all lives are lost.

In Game A, the middle turtle of the five has no fish swimming in reach and never dives unless the explorer waits too long on its back, at which point fish appear and the turtle dives. In Game B, all turtles will dive from the outset, and the colleague appears less frequently.

In both Game A and Game B if the player reaches 200 and 500 points without any lives lost, there will be a period of 20 and 30 seconds respectively when no new fish appear under the turtles. The same goes for 1200, 1500, 2200 points etc.

Turtle Bridge was recreated in Game & Watch Gallery 3 for Game Boy Color.

In the Super Smash Bros. series, Mr. Game & Watch back air has him hit opponents with a turtle, referencing Turtle Bridge.

=== Fire Attack ===
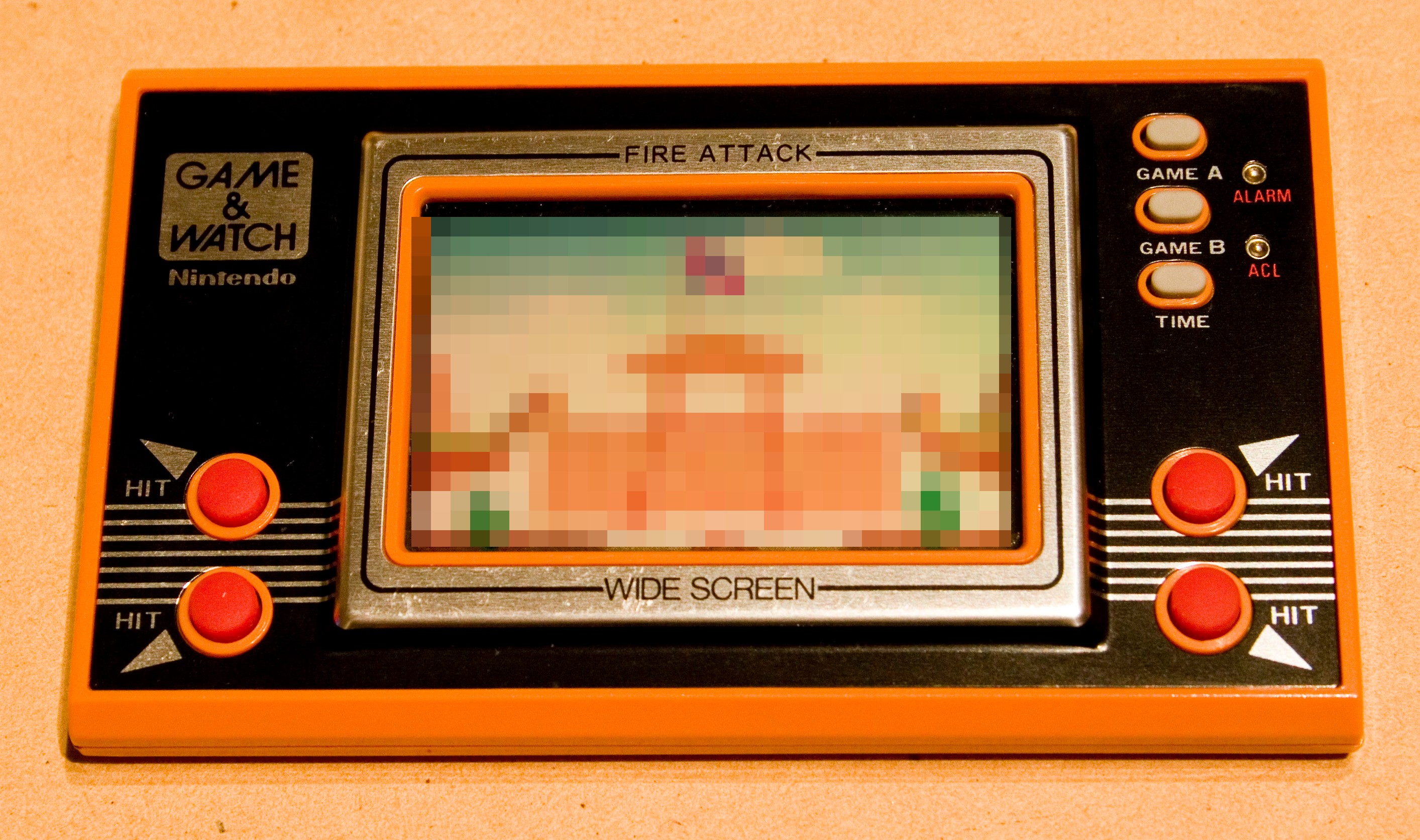
Fire Attack

Fire Attack was released in the Wide Screen series on March 26, 1982. It is a single-screen single-player game.

The main character uses a tomahawk-type weapon to protect a fort from burning. The top row of enemies are Native Americans who throw firesticks, and the bottom row of enemies are traditional Game & Watch characters who try to set fire to the fort with a match. Two points are earned for each fire blocked. Three misses are allowed, which occur each time the fort catches fire. All misses are erased at 200 points and again at 500; if there are not any misses at these times, 5 points are awarded per hit for a period of time.

Fire Attack was recreated in Game & Watch Gallery 4 for Game Boy Advance, although the sprites of the Native Americans in the "Classic Mode" were edited to resemble bandits instead to avoid depicting insensitive sterotypes.

In the Super Smash Bros. series, Mr. Game & Watch has an attack which has him hit opponents with a fire stick, referencing Fire Attack. In Ultimate, Mr. Game & Watch's animations were updated to reflect individual frames from the original games, including gaining a feathered headband when using the move based on Fire Attack. The controversy following this discovery prompted Nintendo to apologize for the potentially offensive stereotype and announce that the animation would be changed in a post-release patch.

=== Snoopy Tennis ===
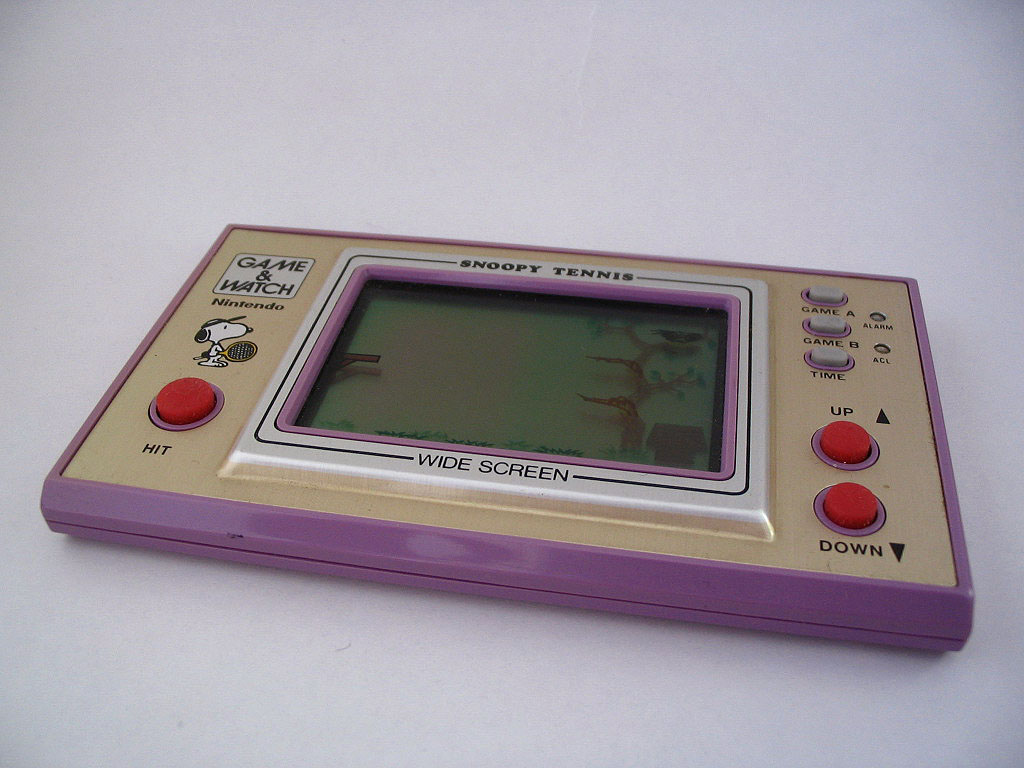
Snoopy Tennis

Snoopy Tennis was released in the Wide Screen series on April 28, 1982. It was rereleased in the Nintendo Mini Classics series.

Charlie Brown throws and hits a ball toward Snoopy, who must hit the ball back. Lucy sometimes will hit the ball to Snoopy.

=== Oil Panic ===
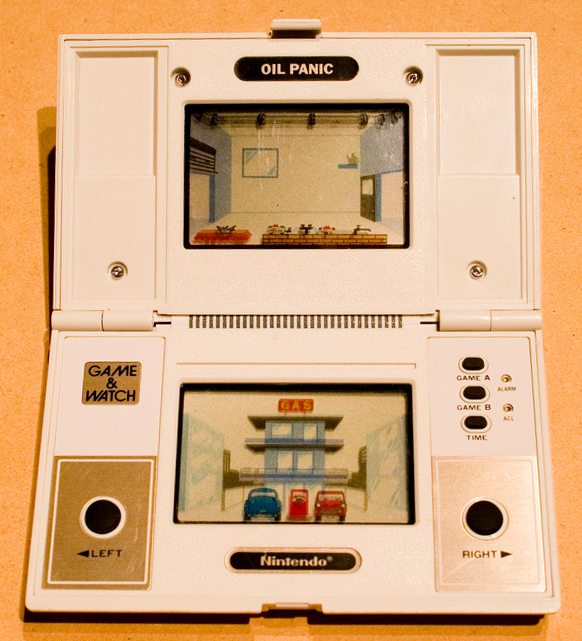
Oil Panic

Oil Panic was released in the Multi Screen series on May 28, 1982. It is the first game in the Multi Screen series and is a dual-screen single-player game with a white case. It opens like a clamshell, with an upper and lower screen.

The player controls a station helper who uses a bucket to catch drops of oil from a leaking pipe and empties the bucket into an oil drum. Missing a drop from the pipe or missing the oil drum causes the player to lose a life. The player has four lives, rather than the usual three.

Oil Panic was recreated in Game & Watch Gallery for Game Boy and Game & Watch Collection for the Nintendo DS (a Club Nintendo-exclusive). Oil Panic is also one of the microgames featured in the collection presented by 9 Volt in WarioWare: Touched!. In Europe, it was also rereleased in the Mini Classics series.

In the Super Smash Bros. series, Mr. Game & Watch has a move called "Oil Panic", where he collects energy-based attacks in an oil bucket to throw at opponents as oil later, referencing Oil Panic. In Melee, the stage Flat Zone is based on a number of Game & Watch games, including Manhole. In Brawl and Super Smash Bros. for Nintendo 3DS, the stage Flat Zone 2 shifts between several layouts, one of which is based on Oil Panic. In Super Smash Bros. for Wii U, the stage Flat Zone X shifts between several layouts, one of which is based on Oil Panic.

=== Donkey Kong ===
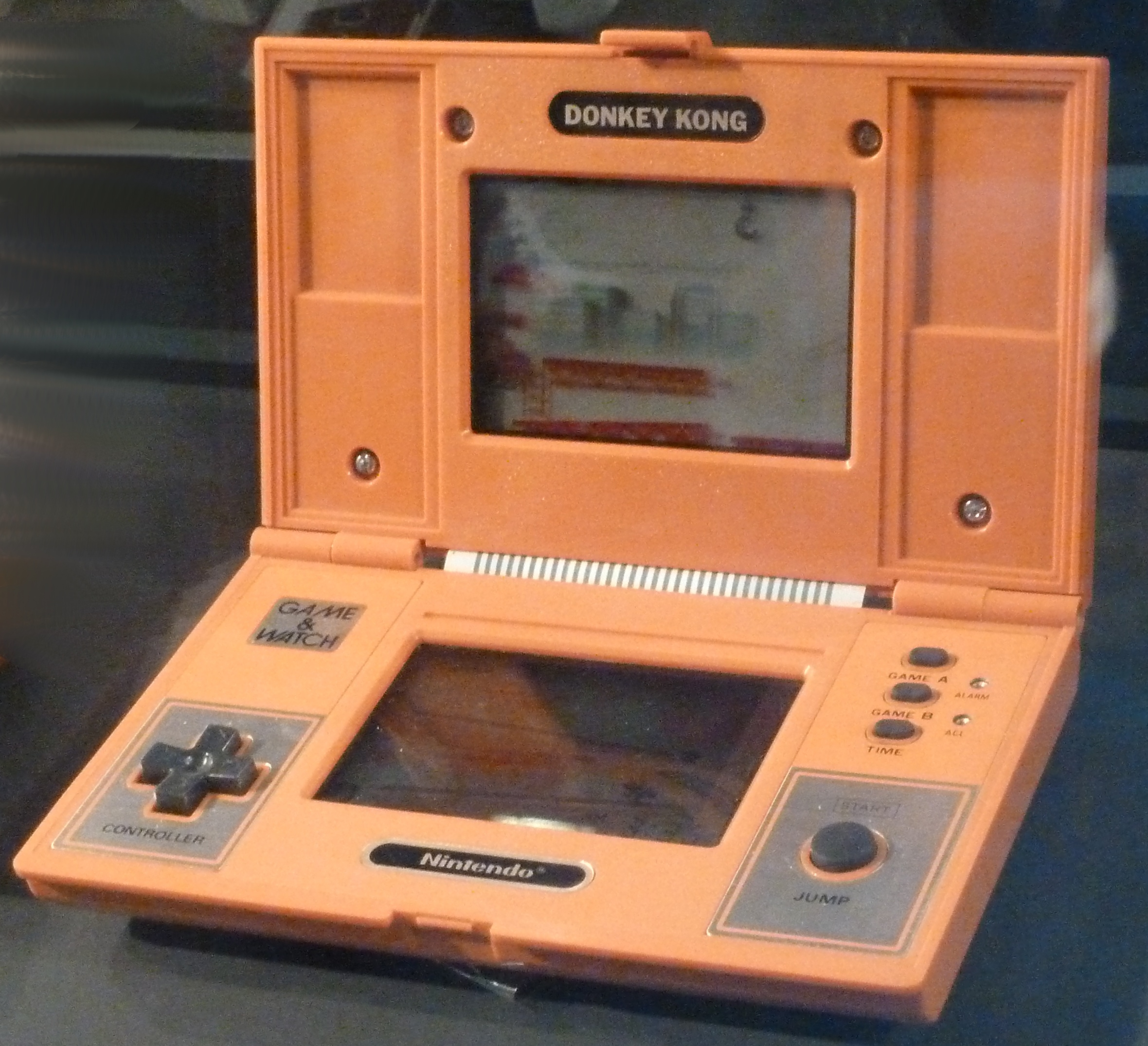
Donkey Kong

Donkey Kong was released in the Multi Screen series on June 3, 1982. It is a dual-screen single-player game with an orange clamshell body. It is the first use of the directional pad or D-pad in Nintendo products.

The Game & Watch version of Donkey Kong sold 8 million units.

Donkey Kong was recreated in Game & Watch Gallery 2 for Game Boy Color, Game & Watch Gallery 4 for Game Boy Advance, and Game & Watch Collection for the Nintendo DS (a Club Nintendo-exclusive). It was rereleased in the Nintendo Mini Classics series.

=== Donkey Kong Jr. ===
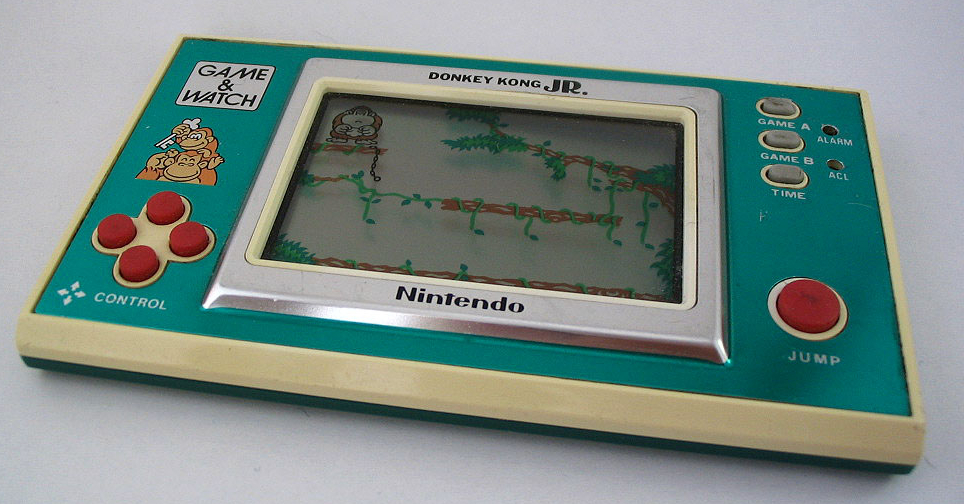
Donkey Kong Jr. (New Wide Screen)

Donkey Kong Jr. was released in the New Wide Screen series on October 26, 1982, in the Table Top series on April 28, 1983, and in the Panorama series on October 4 the same year. It is the first game in the New Wide Screen series and a single-screen single-player game. Hirokazu Tanaka composed the music for the Table Top/Panorama version.

Donkey Kong Jr. was recreated in Game & Watch Gallery 3 for Game Boy Color, and Game & Watch Gallery 4 for Game Boy Advance. It was recreated as a DSiWare game that was released for Nintendo DSi on August 19, 2009 in Japan, on April 19, 2010 in the United States and on April 23 in Europe, and for Nintendo 3DS on July 7, 2011 in Europe. It was rereleased in the Nintendo Mini Classics.

In the Super Smash Bros. series, Mr. Game & Watch has an attack which has him hit opponents with a key, referencing Donkey Kong Jr..

=== Mickey & Donald ===
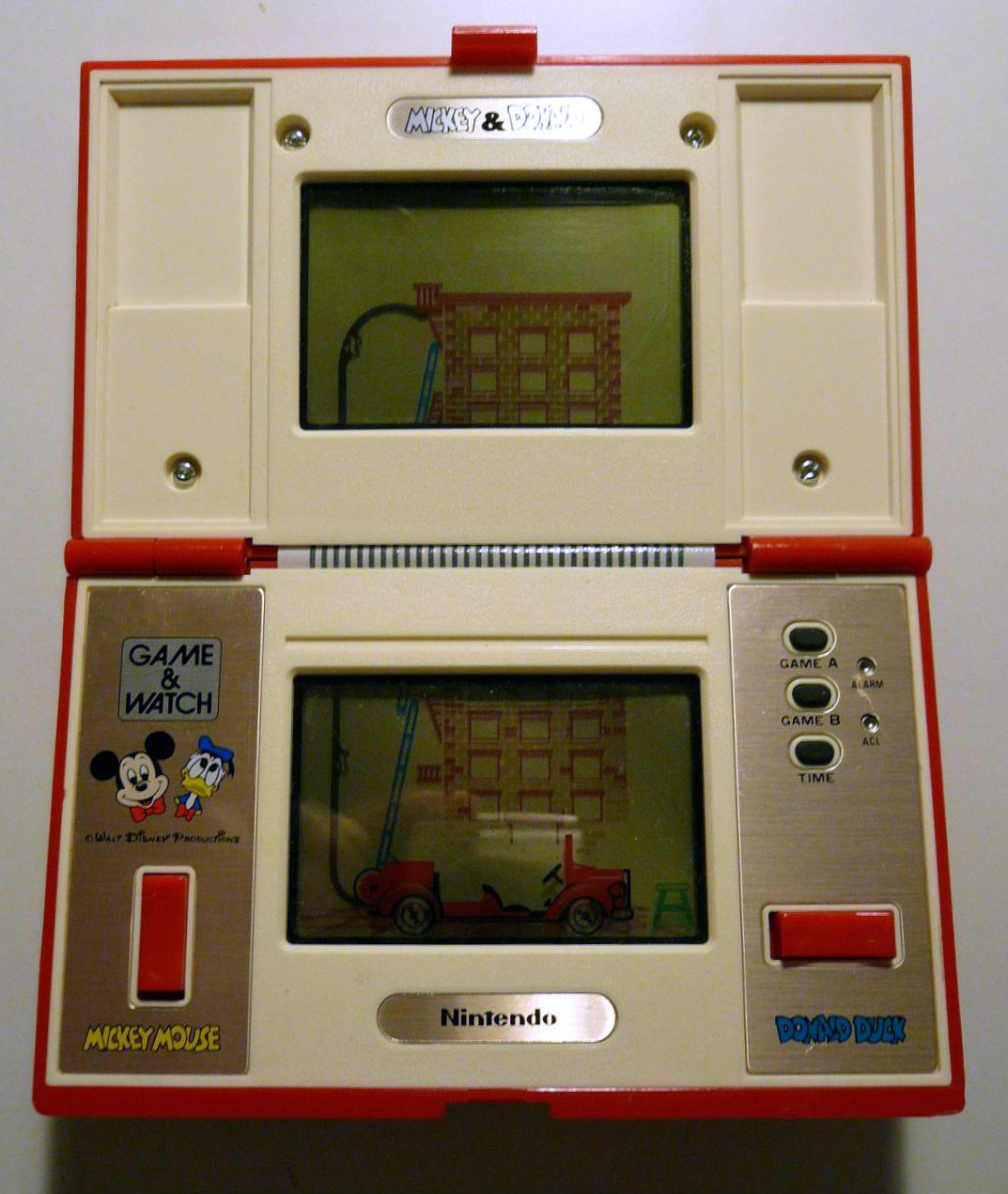
Mickey & Donald

Mickey & Donald was released in the Multi Screen series on November 12, 1982. It is a dual-screen single-player game, with a clamshell case. Hirokazu Tanaka composed the sound.

The goal is put out the fire in a three-story apartment building as quickly as possible. Donald operates the hose, while Mickey runs the pump. Bulges in the hose give more water for Donald to use, but require Mickey to leave the pump to stop leaks.

=== Green House ===
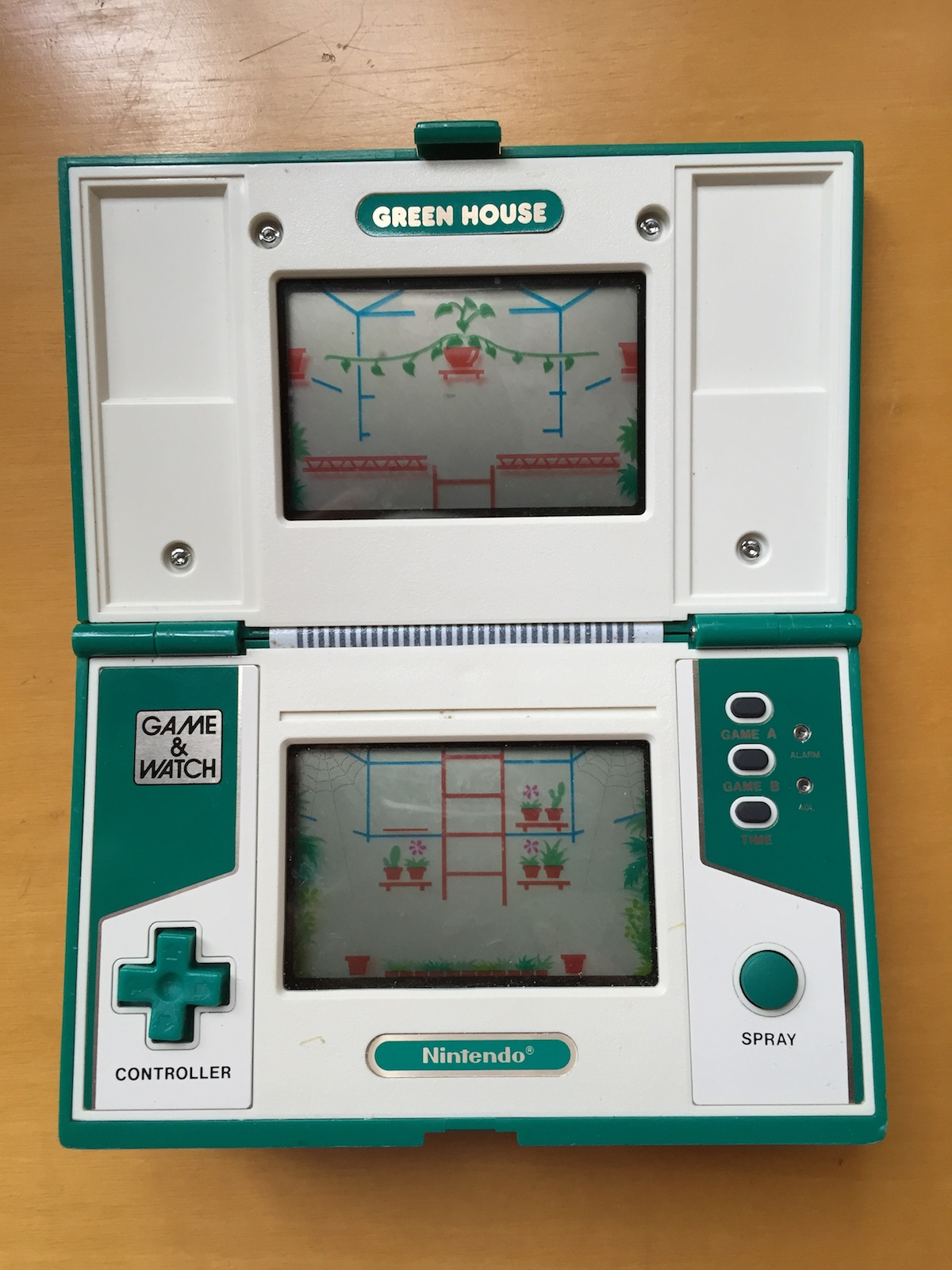
Green House

Green House was released in the Multi Screen series on December 6, 1982. It is a dual-screen single-player game with a clamshell case.

The object is to protect the flowers at each corner of the screen from enemies using a can of bug spray. Worms attack the top flowers while spiders approach the bottom flowers. The game ends when three flowers have been eaten.

Green House was recreated in Game & Watch Gallery 3 for Game Boy Color and Game & Watch Collection for the Nintendo DS (a Club Nintendo-exclusive).

In the Super Smash Bros. series, Mr. Game & Watch has an attack which has him spray opponents with a can of bug spray, referencing Green House.

This is the first appearance of Stanley the Bugman, the lead character in the 1983 arcade game Donkey Kong 3.

=== Donkey Kong II ===
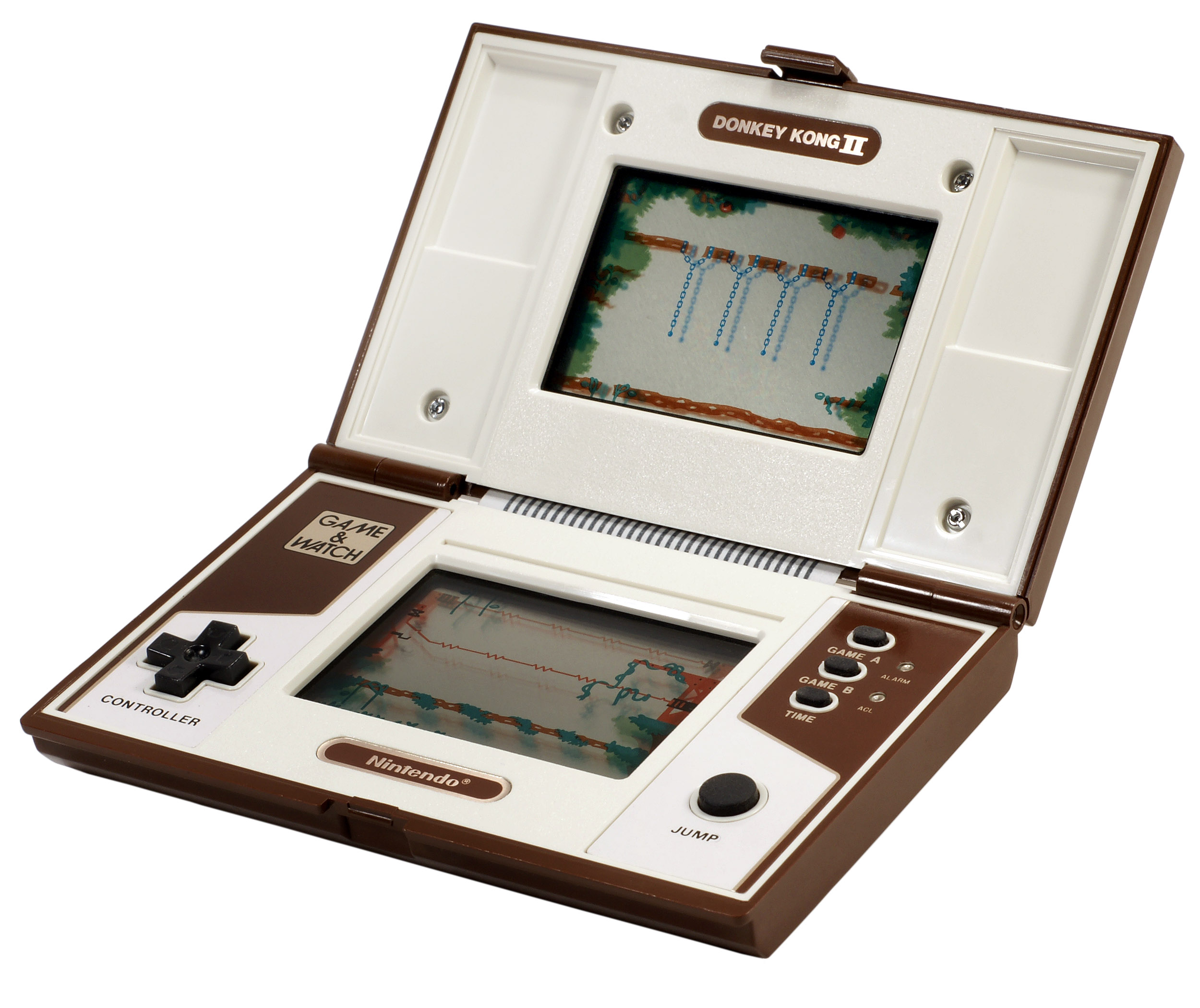
Donkey Kong II

Donkey Kong II was released as a part of the Multi Screen series on March 7, 1983. It is a dual-screen single-player game and has a brown clamshell body. Hirokazu Tanaka composed the sound.

Donkey Kong II was recreated in Game & Watch Gallery 3 for Game Boy Color.

=== Mario Bros. ===
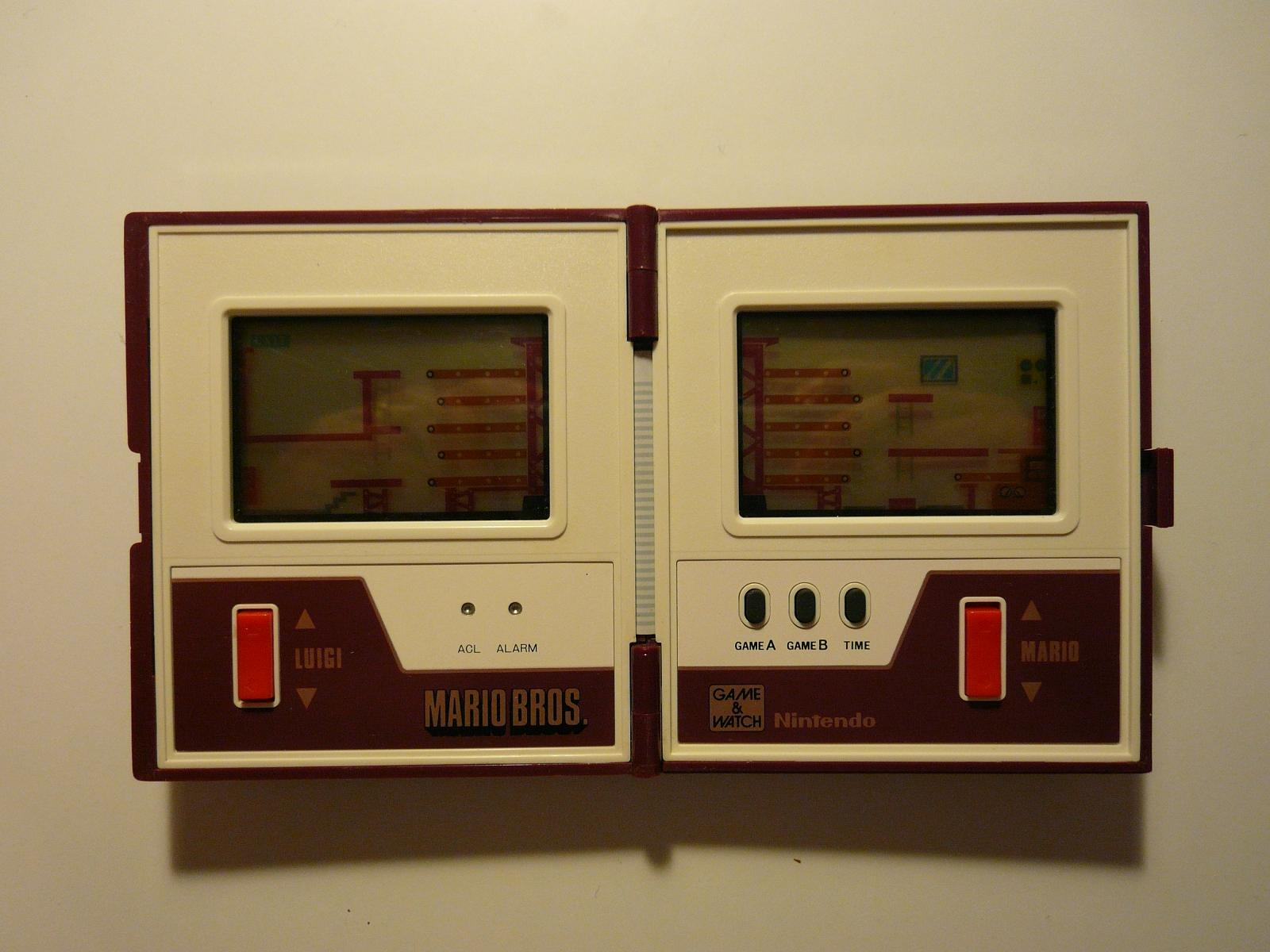
Mario Bros.

Mario Bros. was released in the Multi Screen series on March 14, 1983. It is a dual-screen single-player game and has a maroon clamshell body. It opens like a Japanese book (to the right), with a left and right screen.

Mario and Luigi are working in a bottling plant, on either side of several stacked conveyor belts. The object of the game is to move boxes of bottles through the machine without dropping any. Each brother can climb a ladder to one of three positions. Mario receives a box at the bottom right, and must be in his lowest position to move it into the bottling machine. The box moves left through the machine, to Luigi, who must be in his lowest position to move it to the next level, which moves it to the right, to Mario's middle position, who raises it to the next level. The box moves to Luigi's middle position, then to Mario's highest position, and finally to Luigi's highest position, where Luigi throws the box onto a truck. When the truck is full, the Brothers have a short break, before getting back to work. Successfully moving a box up one level earns the player 1 point, and loading the truck with eight boxes earns 10 points, for a total of 58 points for all the boxes in the truck. If a Brother is not there to catch a box, however, it falls to the floor and breaks, angering the Brothers' supervisor, resulting in a miss. The third miss ends the game.

Mario Bros. was recreated in Game & Watch Gallery 3 for Game Boy Color, and Game & Watch Gallery 4 for Game Boy Advance.

In the Super Smash Bros. series until Ultimate, Mr. Game & Watch's forward air has him hit opponents with a package, referencing Mario Bros. One of his taunts from Super Smash Bros. for Nintendo 3DS and Wii U onward also references the game where he sits and sighs, referencing Mario and Luigi completing a level.

This game marks as Luigi's official debut.

=== Mario's Cement Factory ===
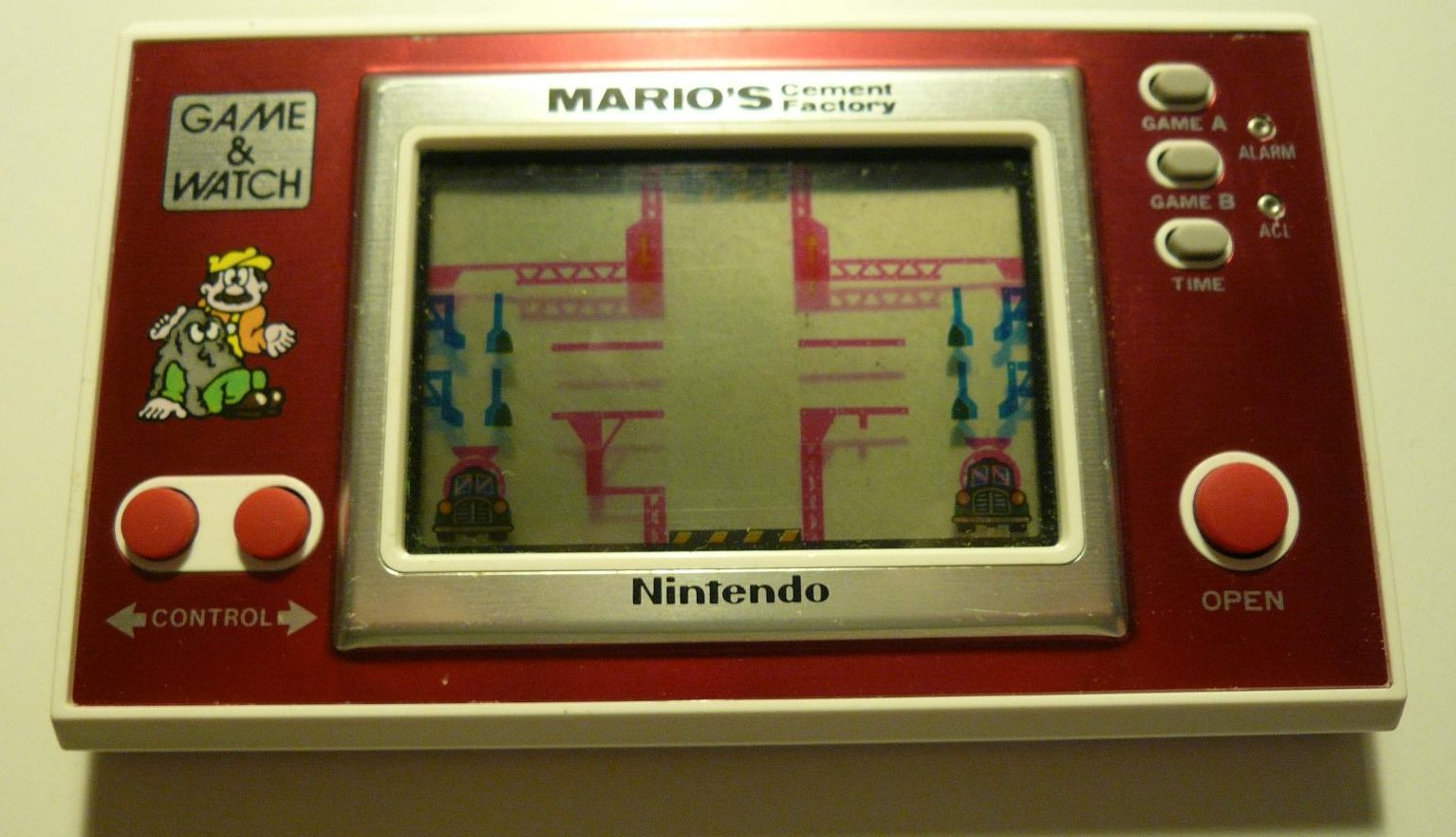
Mario's Cement Factory (New Wide Screen)

Mario's Cement Factory was released in the Table Top series on April 28, 1983 and in the New Wide Screen series on June 8 the same year. It is the first game in the Table Top series and a single-screen single-player game. Hirokazu Tanaka designed the sounds.

Mario's Cement Factory was recreated in Game Boy Gallery for Game Boy and Game & Watch Gallery 4 for Game Boy Advance. It was recreated as a DSiWare game that was released for Nintendo DSi on August 19, 2009 in Japan on March 22, 2010 in the United States, and on March 26 in Europe, and for Nintendo 3DS on July 7, 2011 in Europe. It was rereleased in the Nintendo Mini Classics.

In the Super Smash Bros. series, Mr. Game & Watch grabs opponents with a similar pose to how Mario grabs levers, referencing Mario's Cement Factory.

=== Snoopy ===
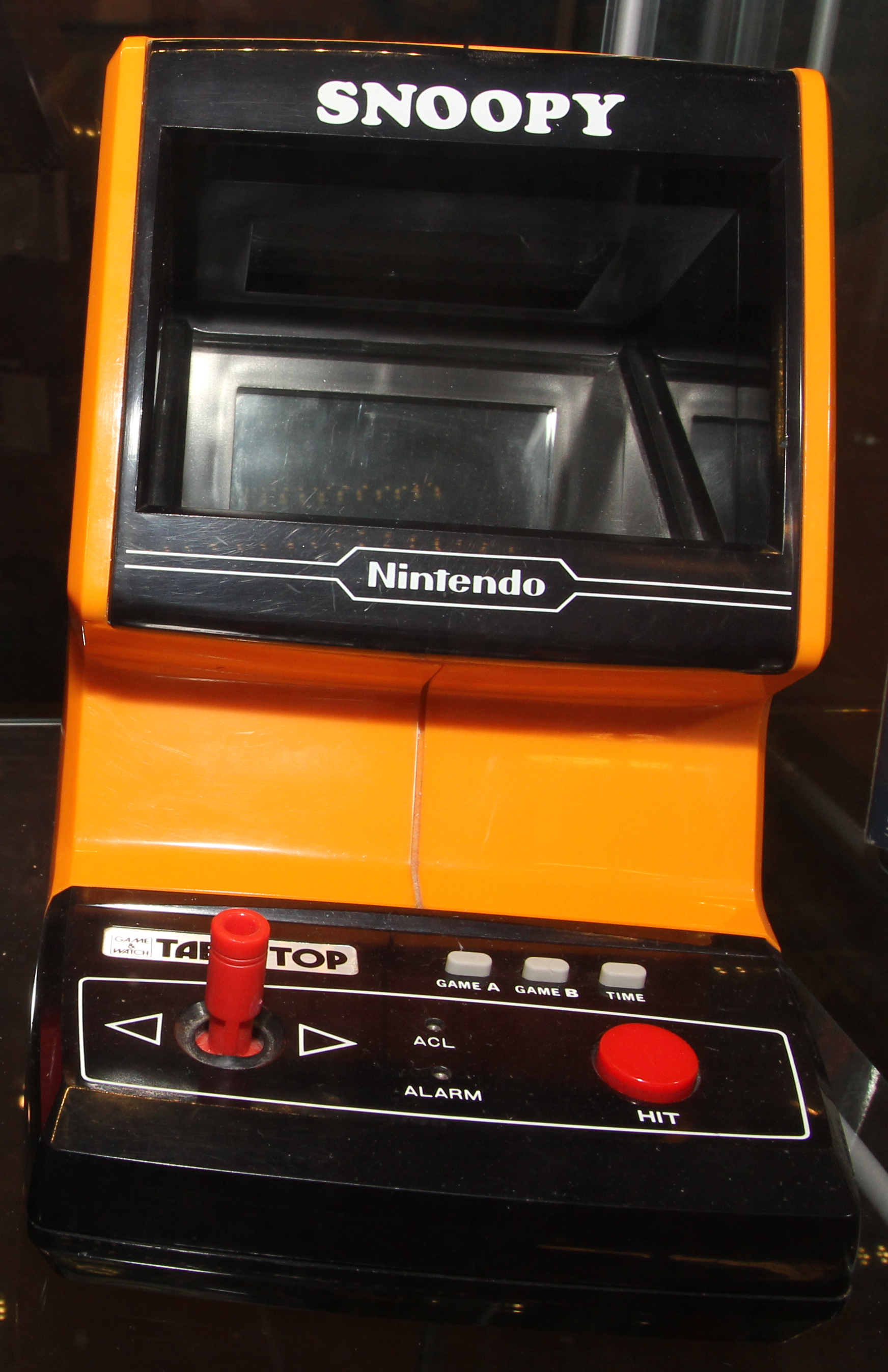
Snoopy (Table Top)

Snoopy was released in the Table Top series on June 5, 1983, and in the Panorama series on August 30 the same year. It is the first game in the Panorama series and a single-screen single-player game. Hirokazu Tanaka composed the music.

When Game A or Game B is pressed, an introductory sequence plays, and after that, the player controls Snoopy to move on different colored platforms. He then must whack the corresponding colored music notes coming from Schroeder's piano before they reach Woodstock and his friends. Failing to whack them in time or going too far to the left or right will make the player earn a miss. After 100 points, Lucy will wake up and attack Schroeder, stunning him for a few seconds.

=== Rain Shower ===
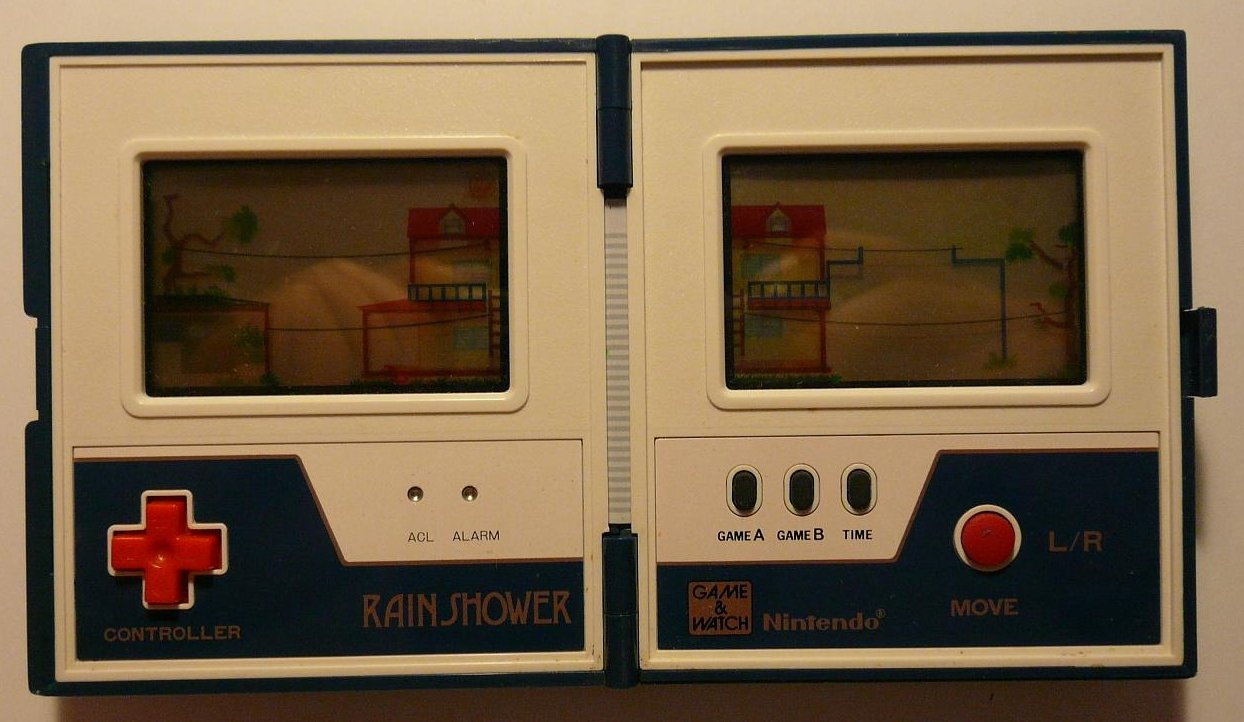
Rain Shower

Rain Shower was released in the Multi Screen series on August 9, 1983. It is a dual-screen single-player game and opens like a book, with a left and right screen.

The player moves clothing away from falling raindrops by pulling on a clothes line. In Game B, a bird may swoop down and move the clothing.

Rain Shower was recreated in Game & Watch Gallery 4 for Game Boy Advance.

=== Lifeboat ===
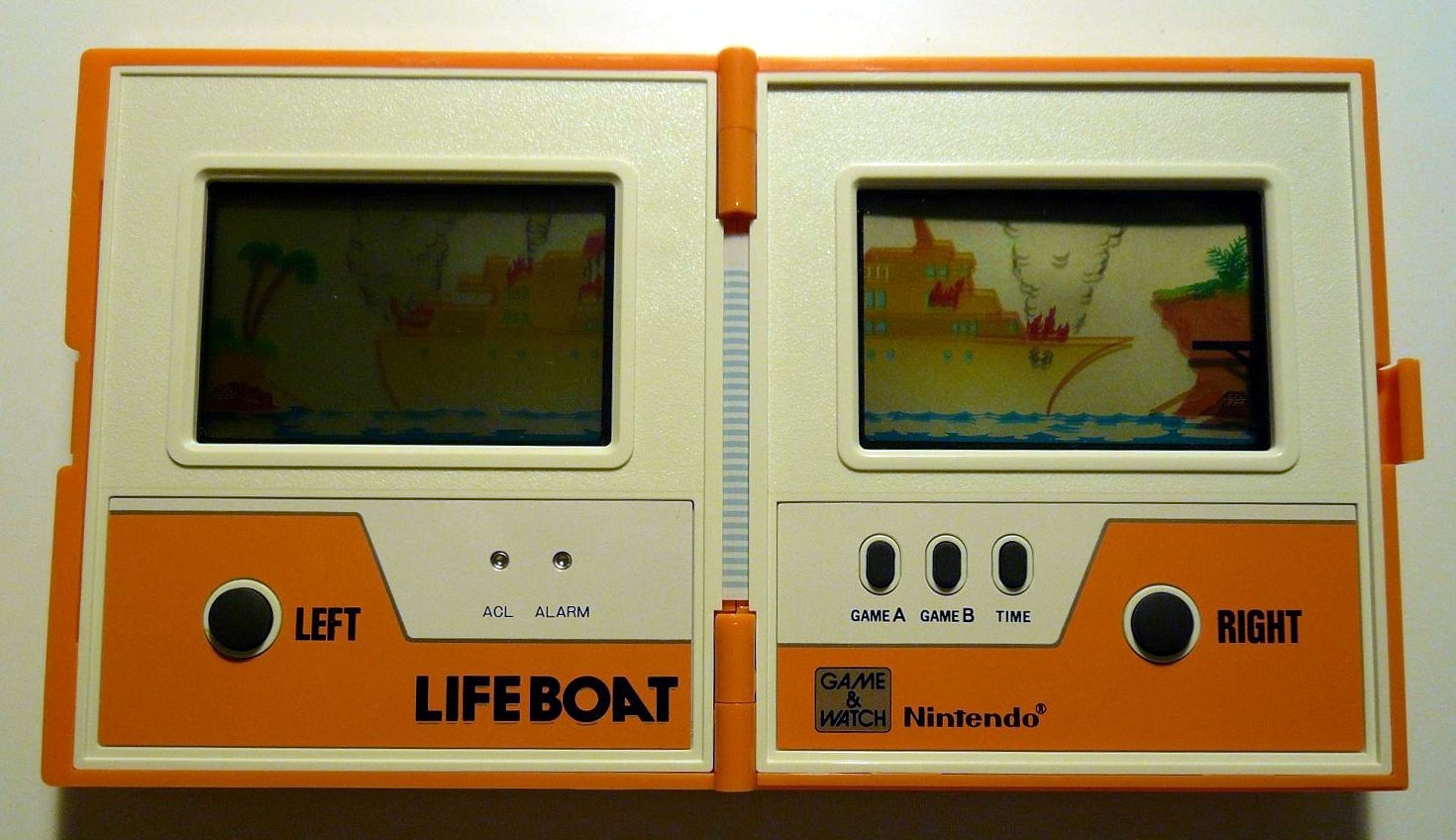
Lifeboat

Lifeboat was released in the Multi Screen series on October 27, 1983. It is a dual-screen single-player game. Its light orange case opens like a book, with a left and right screen.

A burning oceanliner is displayed, and the player pulls a raft through shark-infested waters to catch the people who fall from the ship. The rafts can hold up to 4 people, and can be emptied no matter how many people are in them. A point is awarded for each rescue. The alarm on is indicated by a bucket of water on the cliffside, and when it goes off, a man uses the bucket to attempt to douse the fire.

Game A mode controls two rafts, one on each side of the screen, which move together when the left and right buttons are pressed. In Game B there is only one raft, which can move from one side of the screen to the other.

Lifeboat was recreated in Game & Watch Gallery 4 for Game Boy Advance.

=== Mario's Bombs Away ===
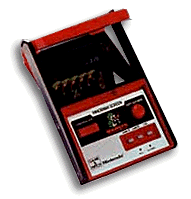
Mario's Bombs Away

Mario's Bombs Away was released in the Panorama series on November 4, 1983. It is a single-screen single-player game. It features an unlit color LCD screen that faces downward to expose the translucent rear to an external light source, such as daylight. Hirokazu Tanaka composed the music.

The player character is a military-clad Mario who delivers bombs from left to right, and must keep them away from flaming oil spills and enemy torches. Action is viewed in a mirror that reflects the screen.

Mario's Bombs Away was recreated in Game & Watch Gallery 4 for Game Boy Advance.

=== Pinball ===
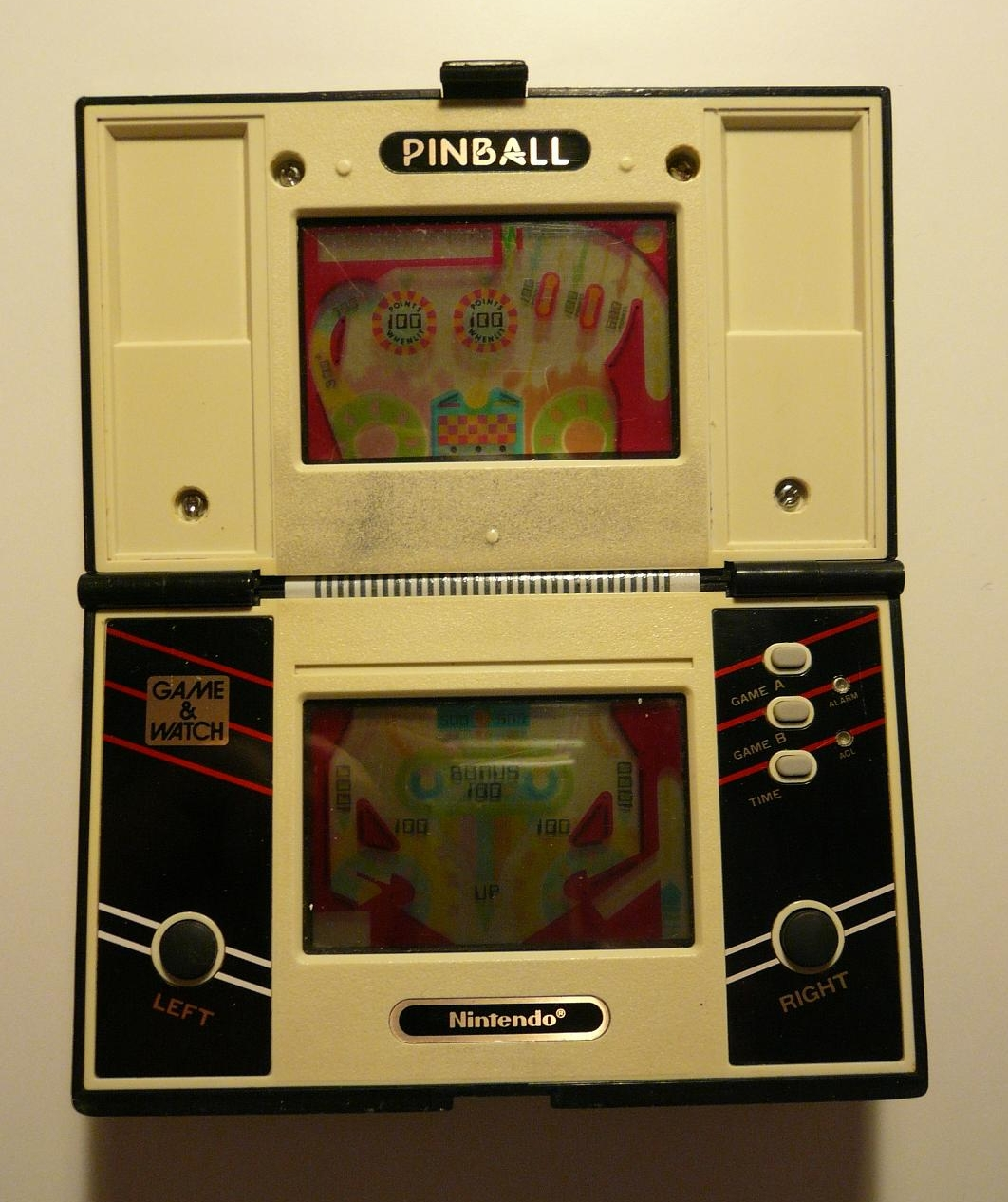
Pinball

Pinball was released in the Multi Screen series on December 5, 1983. It is a dual-screen single-player game, with a clamshell case. Hirokazu Tanaka composed the music.

The player controls two flippers on the bottom screen and two on the top screen. Other pinball objects include bumpers, outlanes, rollover lanes, kickbacks and plungers.

=== Spitball Sparky ===
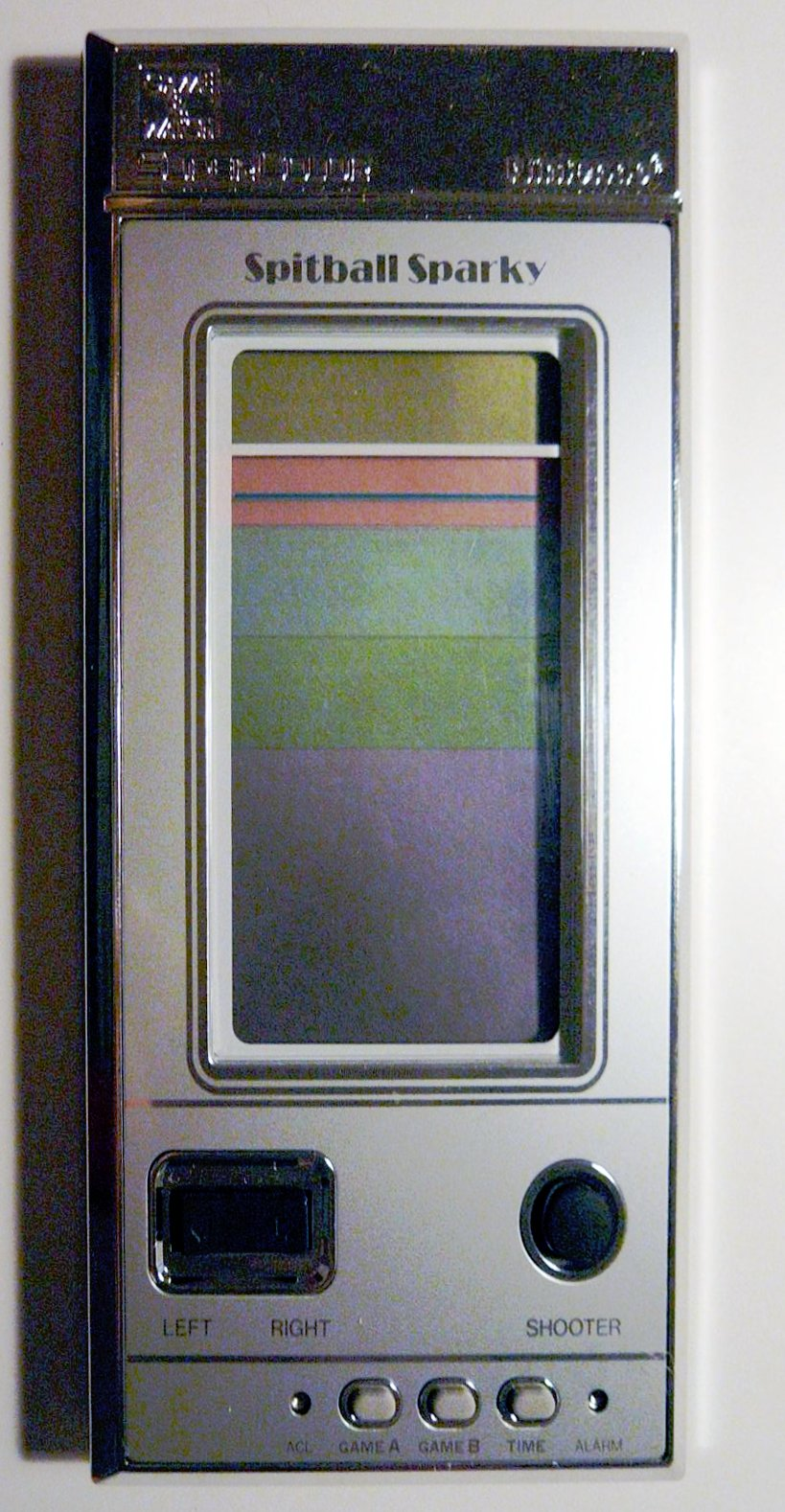
Spitball Sparky

Spitball Sparky was released in the Super Color series on February 6, 1984. It is the first game in the Super Color series and a single-screen single-player game. Hirokazu Tanaka composed the music.

Spitball Sparky works similarly to Breakout, where a ball moves across the screen and is propelled by the player, blowing it upwards as long it is directly above the player in the purple space. If all blocks are eliminated fast enough, a bonus bar at the top would add 5 points per segment, the most being 20 points. Along the top row are red blocks, which require two hits to destroy. If the player eliminates all but the red blocks, and then hits each red block once to make them flash, it awards more bonus points.

Spitball Sparky was recreated in Game & Watch Gallery 3 for Game Boy Color.

In the Super Smash Bros. series, Mr. Game & Watch's up air has him blow opponents upwards, referencing Spitball Sparky.

=== Crab Grab ===
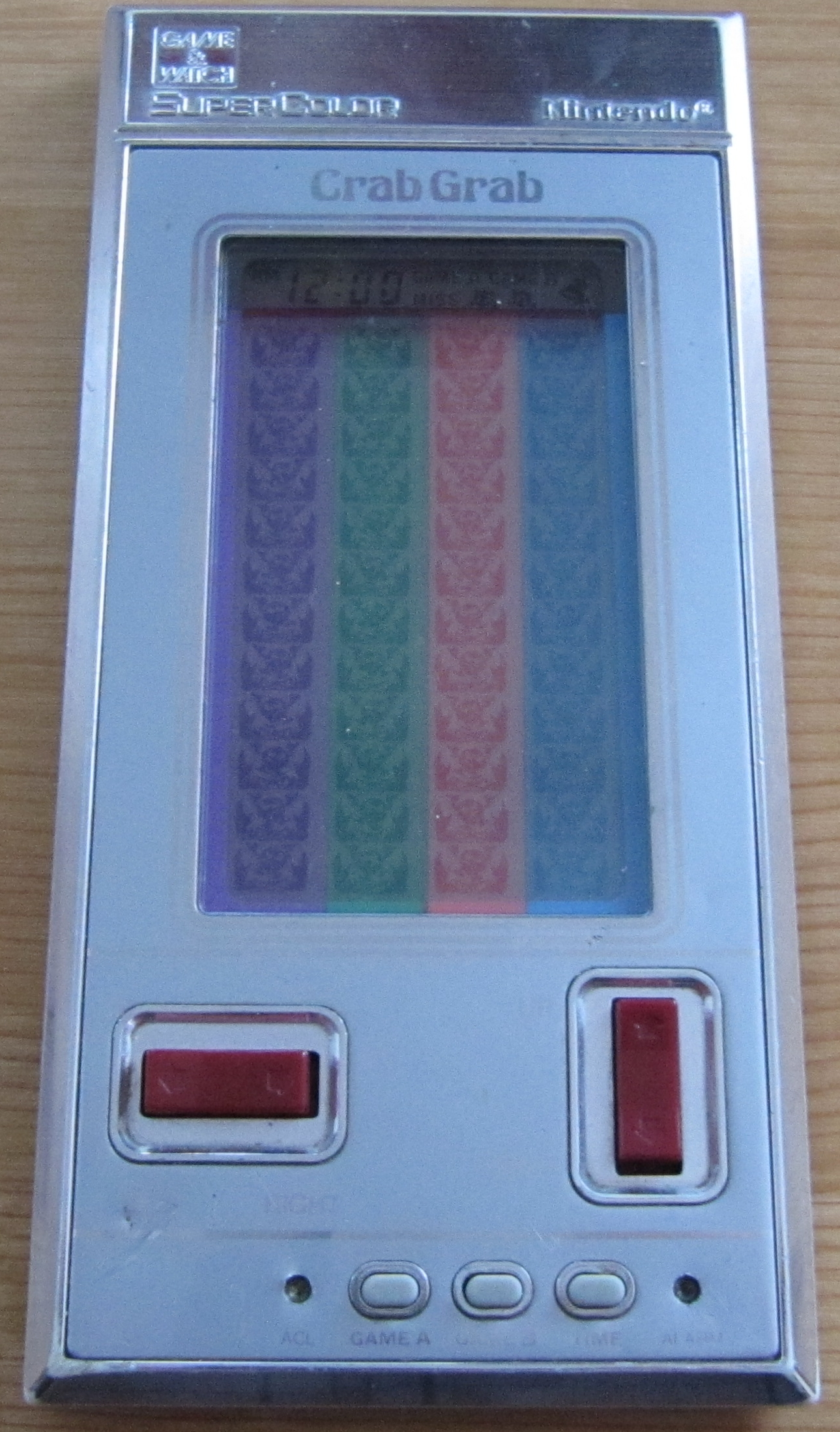
Crab Grab

Crab Grab was released in the Super Color series on February 20, 1984. It is a single-screen single-player game.

Crabs emerge from four differently colored columns along the bottom of the screen, and settle at the top. The objective is to avoid being in front of the crab, and to push the crabs from the bottom to prevent them from mounting on the screen. Points are earned by pushing and eliminating crabs. The game ends when the player has been bitten three times. Player movement is in all four directions (Up, Down, Left, Right). The A & B games had similar objectives, but with slightly different speeds.

=== Donkey Kong Circus ===
Donkey Kong Circus was released in the Panorama series on March 2, 1984. It is a single-screen two-player game with a lilac body. The gameplay is similar to Mickey Mouse in the Panorama series.

=== Boxing ===
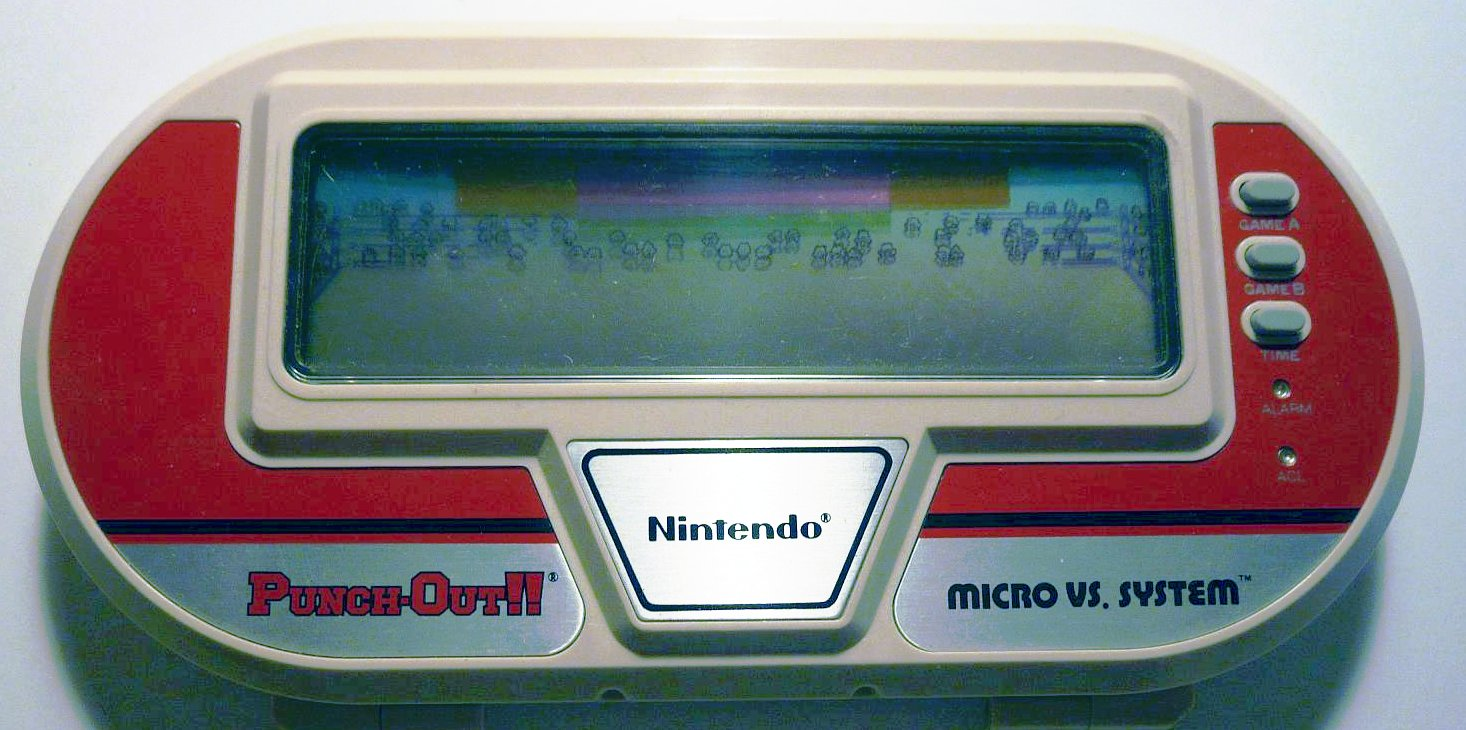
Punch-Out!!

Boxing, known as Punch-Out!! in the United States, was released in the Micro Vs. series on July 31, 1984. It is the first game in the Micro Vs. series and a single-screen two-player game.

It is similar to Urban Champion, although it was released shortly before the NES game.

Boxing was recreated in Game & Watch Gallery 4 for Game Boy Advance.

=== Donkey Kong 3 ===
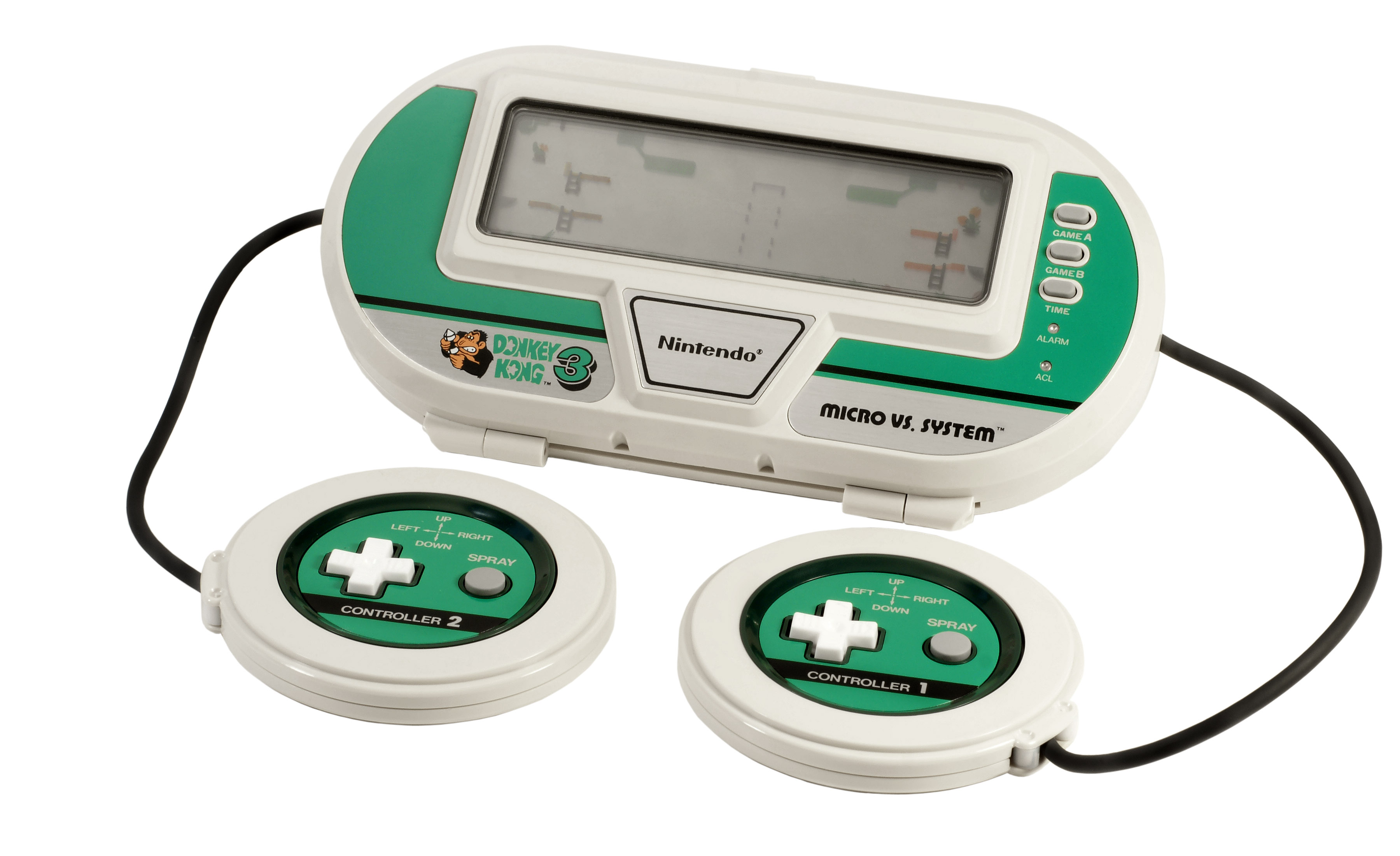
Donkey Kong 3

Donkey Kong 3 was released in the Micro Vs. series on August 20, 1984.

Donkey Kong 3 was recreated in Game & Watch Gallery 4 for Game Boy Advance.

=== Donkey Kong Hockey ===
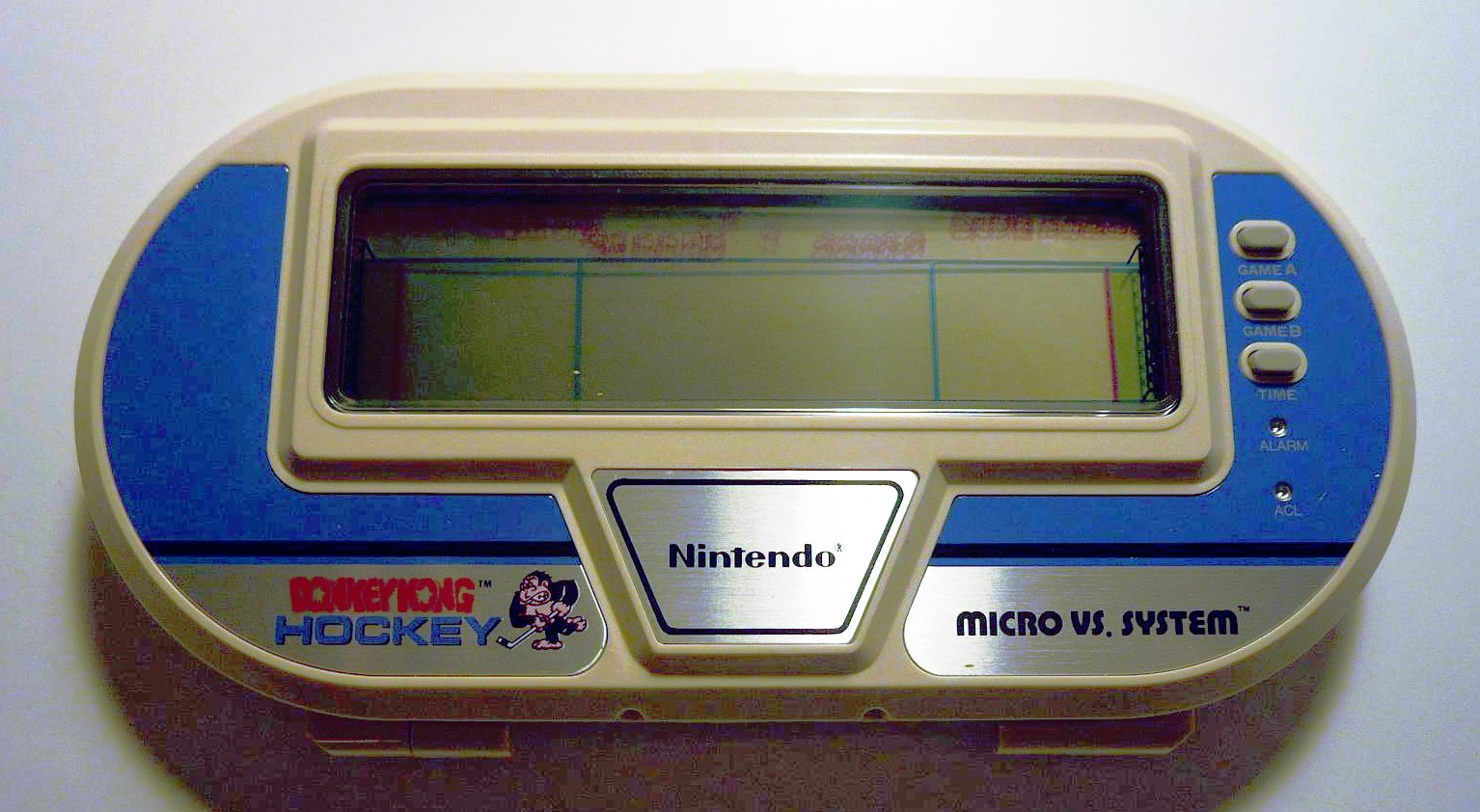
Donkey Kong Hockey

Donkey Kong Hockey was released as a part of the Micro Vs. series on November 13, 1984. It is a single-screen two-player game.

=== Black Jack ===
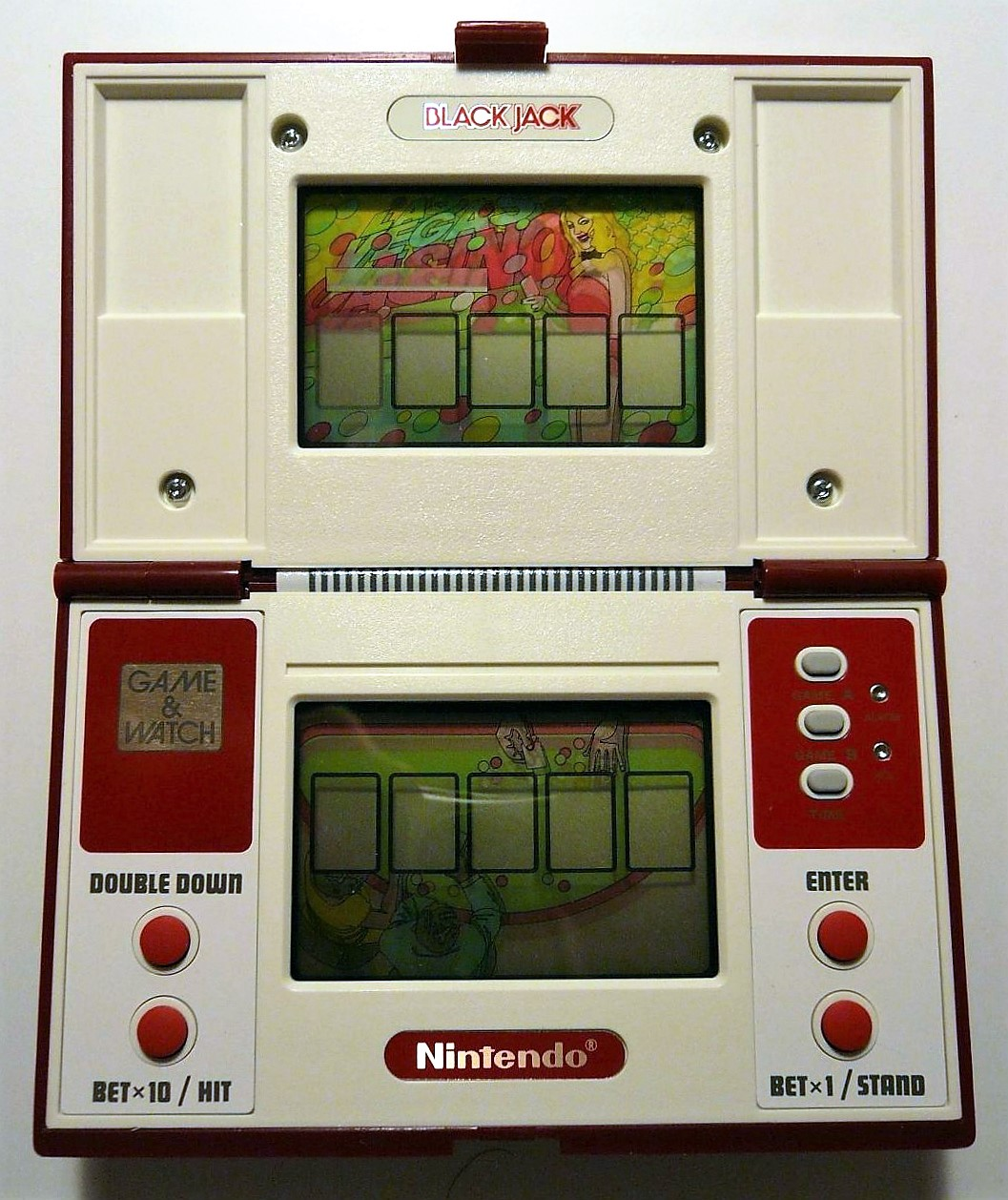
Black Jack

Black Jack was released as a part of the Multi Screen series on February 15, 1985. It is a dual-screen single-player game. Its maroon clamshell body has an upper and lower screen.

Game A is a blackjack game. The dealer's hand is on the upper screen and the player's hand is on the bottom screen. Four buttons are available: double down, bet ×10/hit, bet ×1/stand and enter. The player starts with a $500 bankroll and can bet up to $100 each hand. Pair splitting is not allowed, and bets must be locked before shuffling is done, contrary to real-world blackjack rules.

In Game B, the player starts with $500 as five numbers cycle on the bottom screen. Pressing the enter button causes the numbers to stop one at a time. There is a $50 reward if all five stop on the same number, or a deduction of $25 if not.

=== Tropical Fish ===
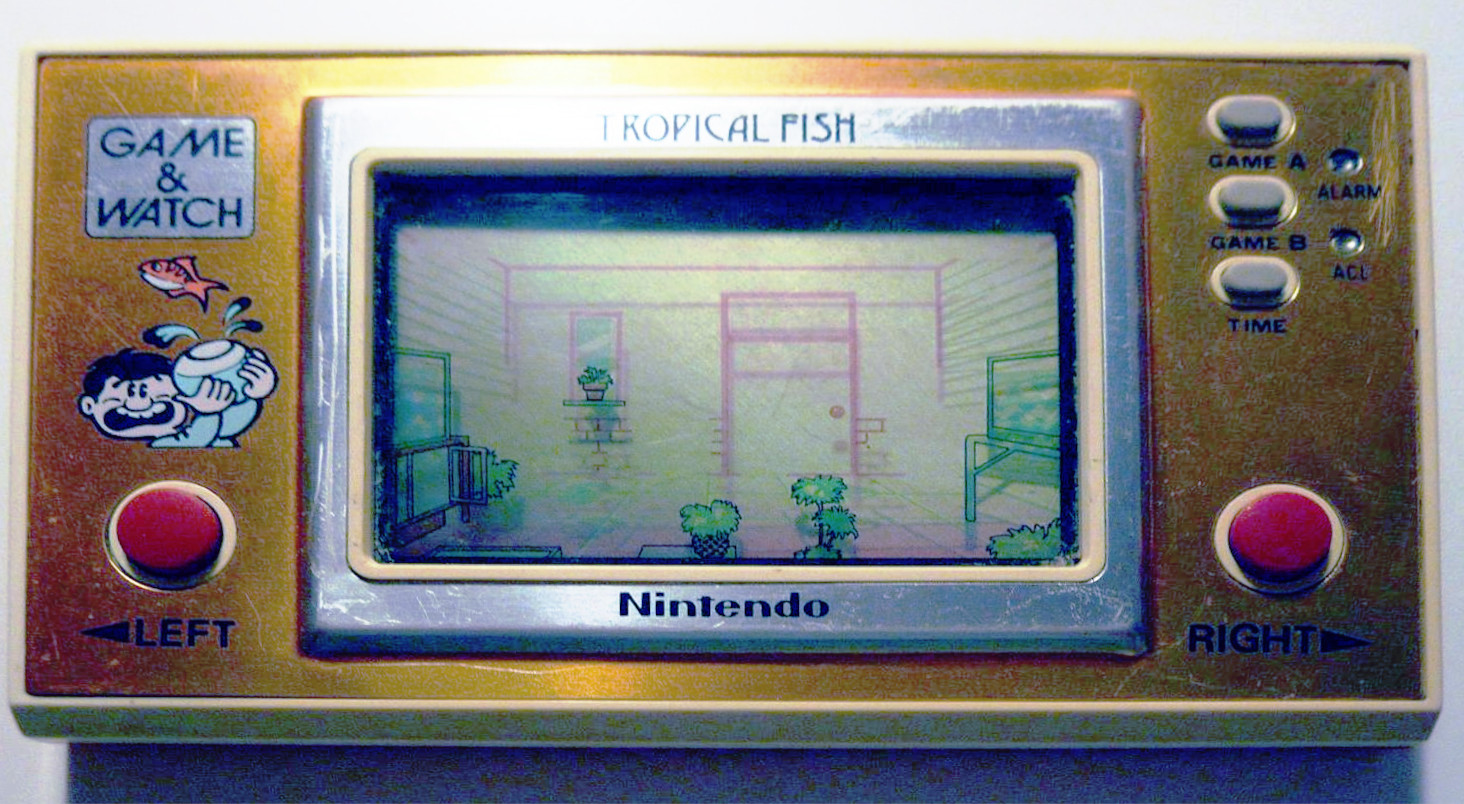
Tropical Fish

Tropical Fish was released in the New Wide Screen series on July 8, 1985. It is a single-screen single-player game.

The player uses a fishbowl to catch fish that jump out of a tank and must move them into a tank on the other side. The game ends when three fish are missed.

Tropical Fish was recreated in Game & Watch Gallery 4 for Game Boy Advance.

In Super Smash Bros. Brawl and 3DS and Wii U, Mr. Game & Watch has an attack which has him hit opponents with a fish bowl, referencing Tropical Fish.

=== Squish ===
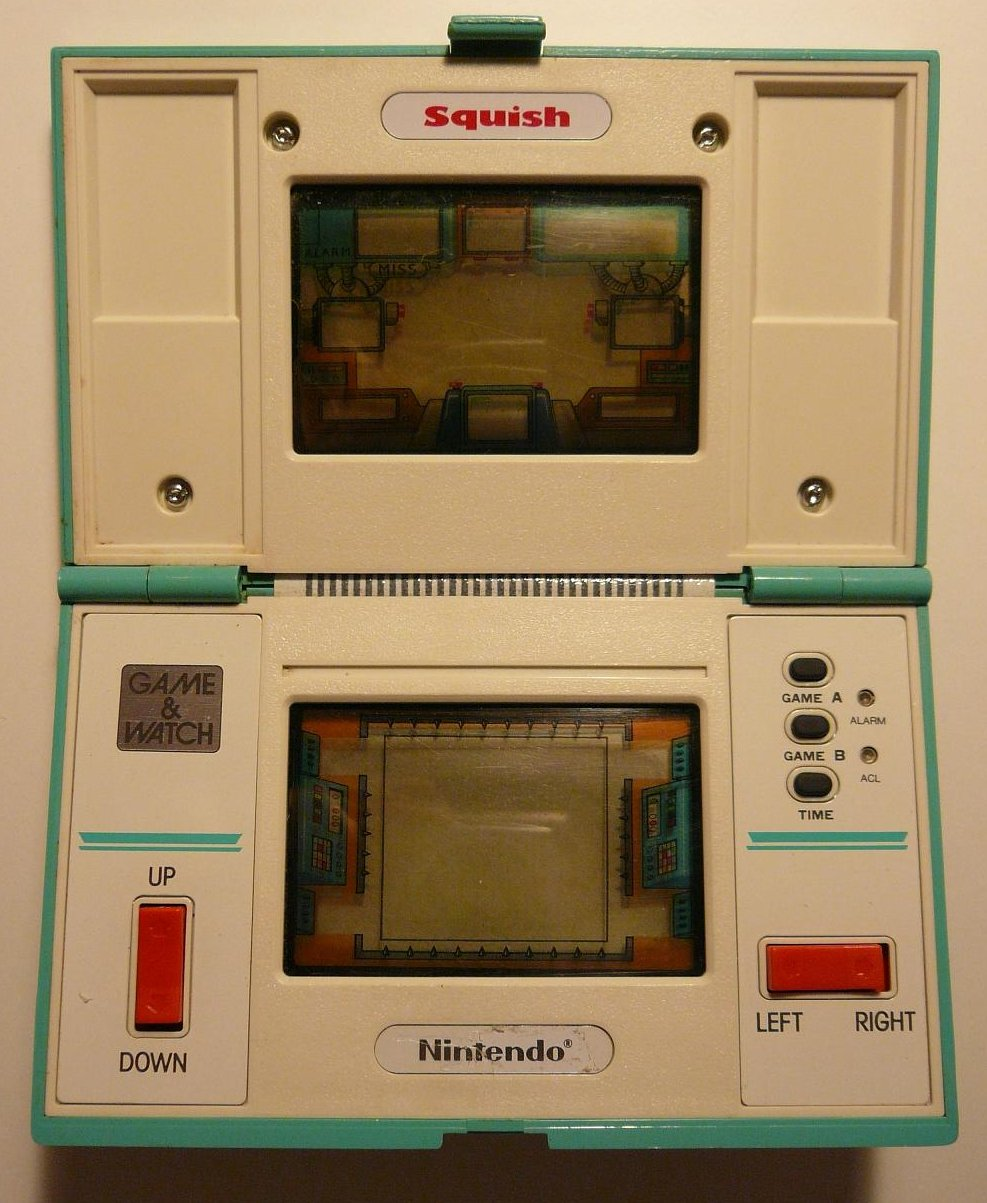
Squish

Squish was released in the Multi Screen series on April 17, 1986. It is a dual-screen single-player game, with a clamshell case and an upper and lower screen. It is similar to Devil World.

=== Super Mario Bros. ===
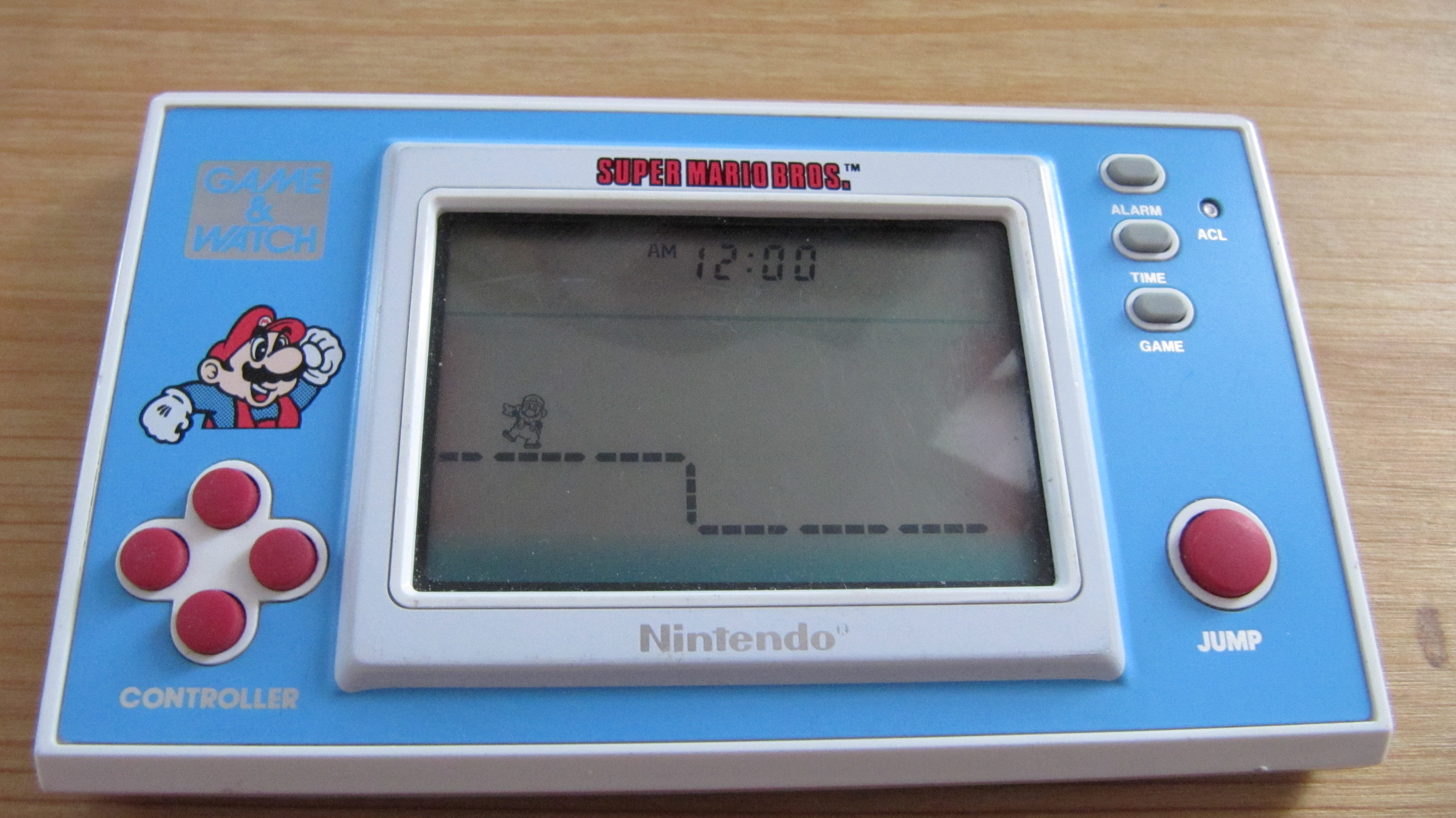
Super Mario Bros. (New Wide Screen)

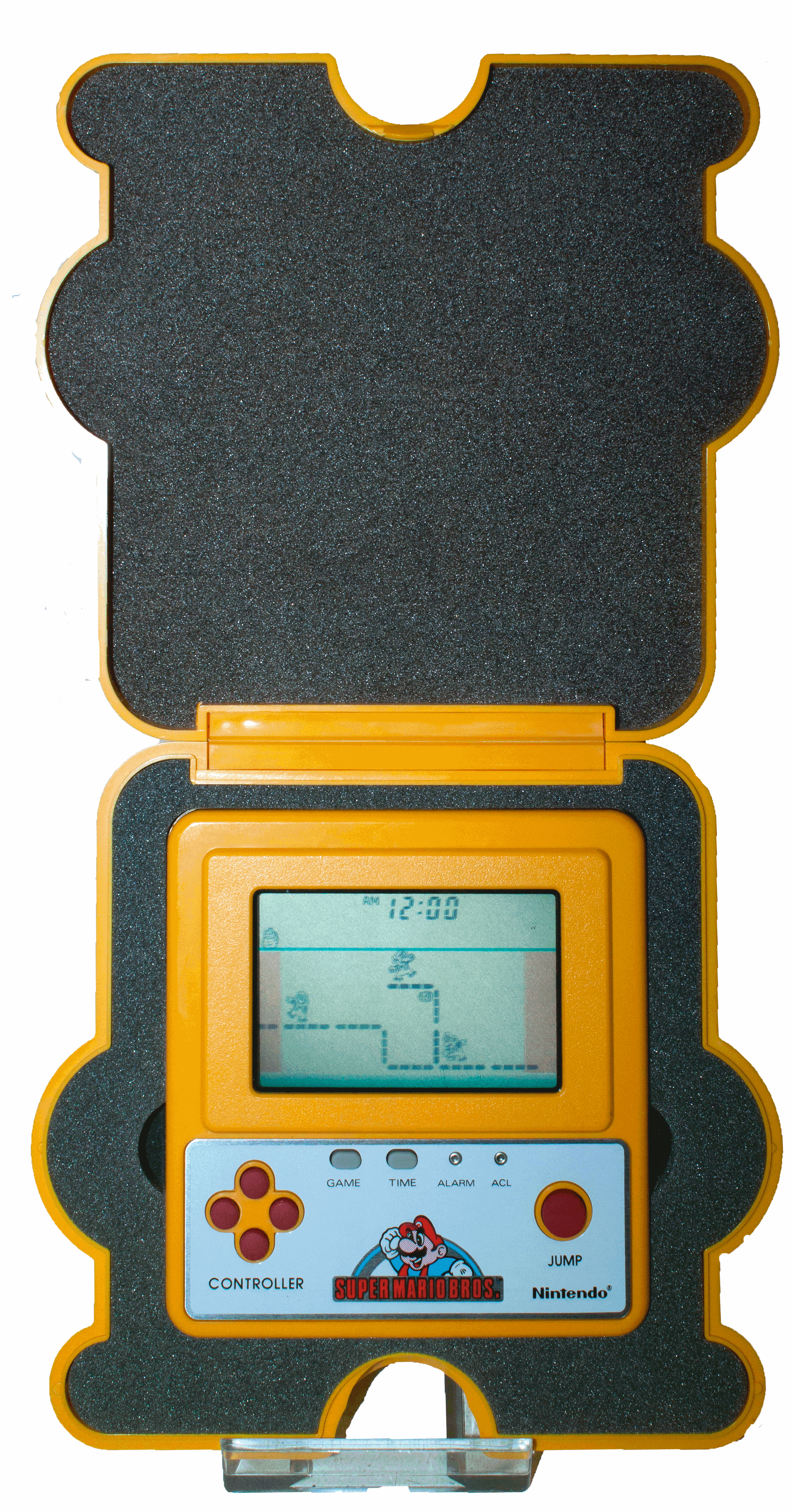
Super Mario Bros. YM-901-S, special edition for tournament

Super Mario Bros. was released in the Crystal Screen series on June 25, 1986, and in the New Wide Screen series on March 8, 1988. It is the first game in the Crystal Screen series and a single-screen single-player game.

Mario traverses levels to save Princess Toadstool (also known as Peach), as in the NES game Super Mario Bros. (1985).

It was a prize for the Famicom's F-1 Grand Prix tournament on August 1, 1987 with the code YM-901-S. It is a single-screen single-player game with a yellow case. It came in a plastic box modeled after Disk-kun, the Famicom Disk System mascot. This edition is the rarest of all Game & Watch models, with only 10,000 units produced and never available at retail. It was rereleased in the Nintendo Mini Classics 1998 series.

=== Climber ===
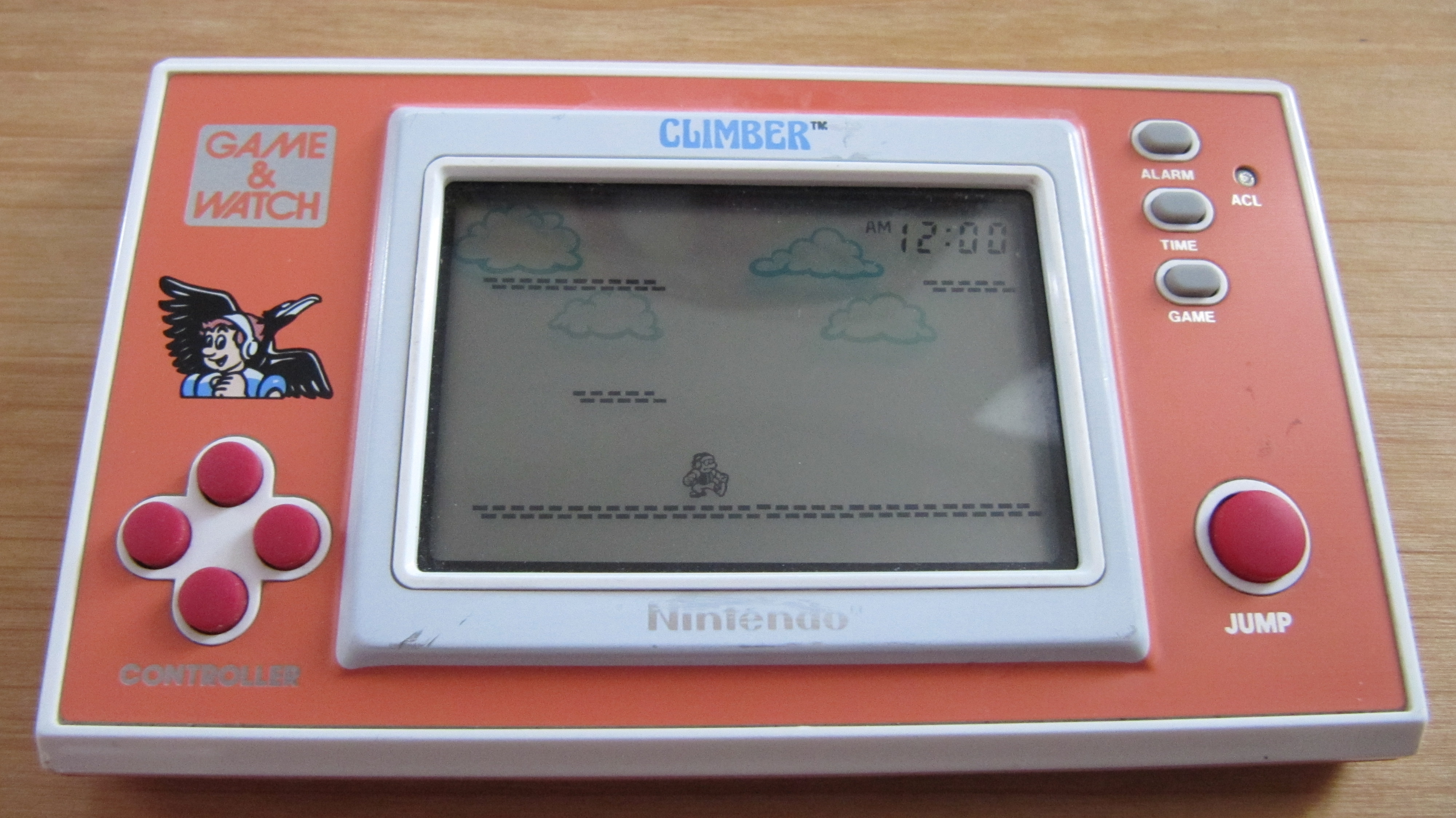
Climber (New Wide Screen)

Climber was released in the Crystal Screen series on July 4, 1986, and in the New Wide Screen series on March 8, 1988. It is a single-screen single-player game and is similar to Ice Climber.

A boy known as the Climber sets out for the Block Mountain where the Blockmen live to train as warriors. Lord Meiji, who he meets on the way, grants him a pair of boots which enable him to jump very high, armor that can break ceilings, and a head band which will help him find a sword that can defeat Dragalo the Dragon. The climber pursues his quest with the assistance of the mysterious bird Hentori. The objective of the game is to control Climber by jumping through a tower of platforms and landing on them, and by avoiding monsters and Blockmen. The goal is to either grab Hentori or slash Dragalo while achieving the highest score possible.

Climber was recreated in Game & Watch Gallery 4 for Game Boy Advance.

=== Balloon Fight ===
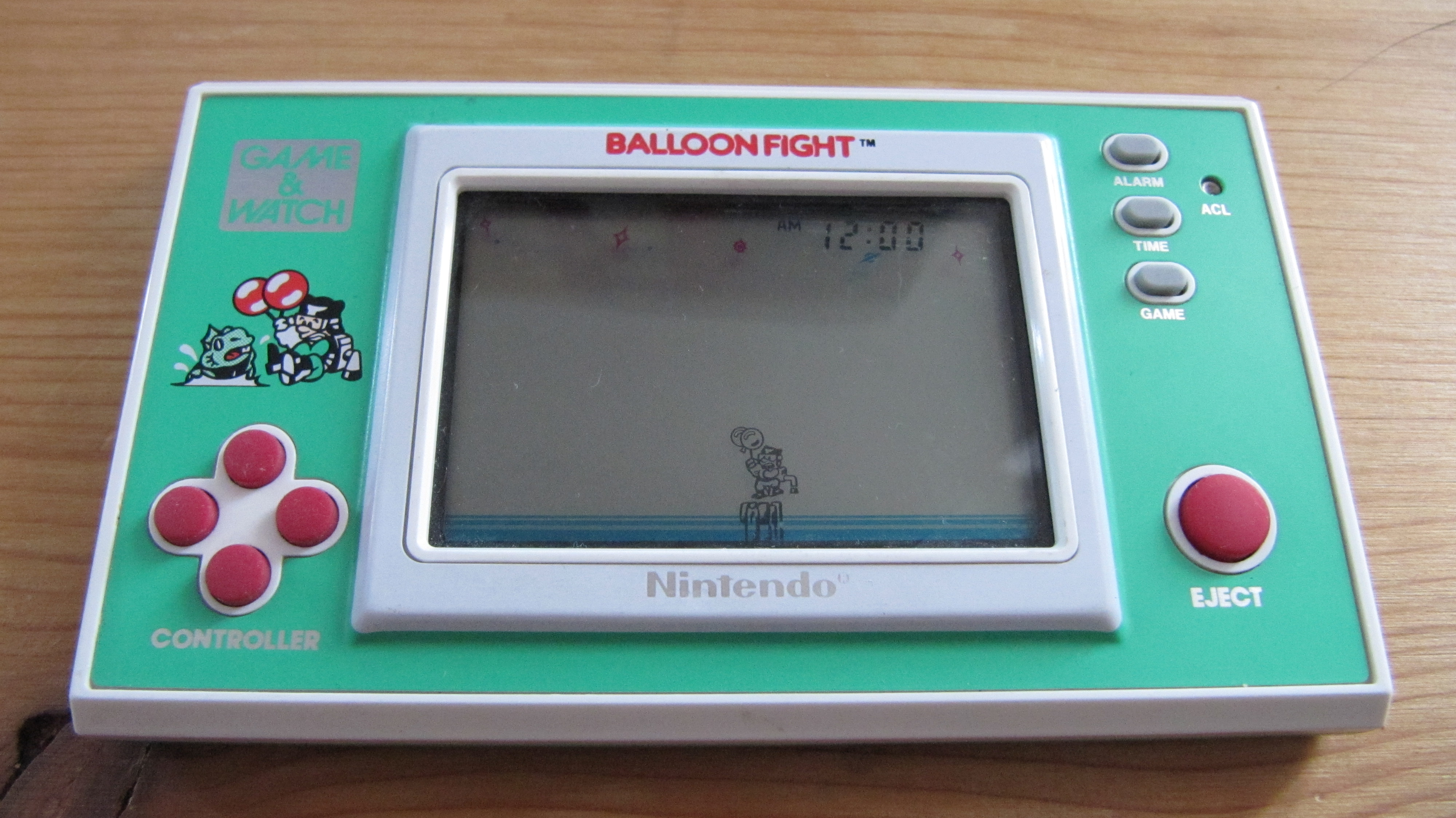
Balloon Fight (New Wide Screen)

Balloon Fight was released in the Crystal Screen series on November 19, 1986, and in the New Wide Screen series on March 8, 1988. It is a single-screen single-player game.

This game is modeled after the Balloon Trip mode of the NES version. The screen auto-scrolls from the left, and the player must collect balloons while avoiding airborne sparks. The player controls a "Balloon Man" who is chasing an escaped criminal known as Oiram Repus. In every eight phases, there is a boss fight against Oiram Repus, where the player must avoid a pattern of sparks for an amount of time.

This game has not received any official playable ports, but it does appear in the museum portion of Game & Watch Gallery 3, showcasing a simple and non-interactive demo.

=== Bomb Sweeper ===
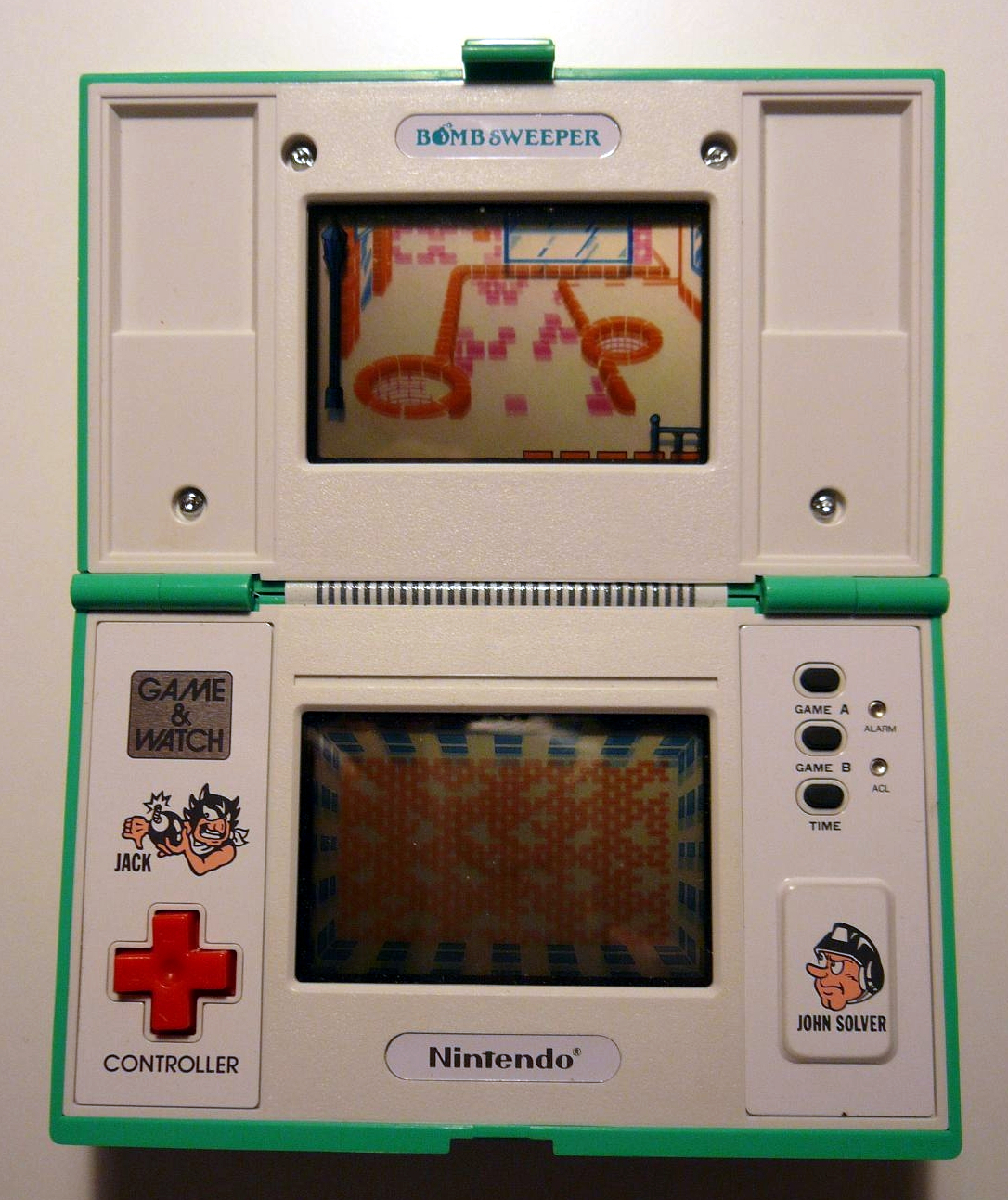
Bomb Sweeper

Bomb Sweeper was released in the Multi Screen series on June 15, 1987. It is a dual-screen single-player game with a clamshell case.

The player character is John Solver, who must navigate a maze to defuse bombs set by "Jack". When playing on "Game A" mode, the maze begins to move from left to right after a certain number of bombs are defused, and the player must find an exit back to the surface. The top screen is merely cosmetic, and shows the boss who sends the player character into the underground maze. Unlike in most Game & Watch games, lost lives are not reset when a player reaches 300 points.

Bomb Sweeper was recreated in Game & Watch Gallery 4 for Game Boy Advance.

=== Safebuster ===
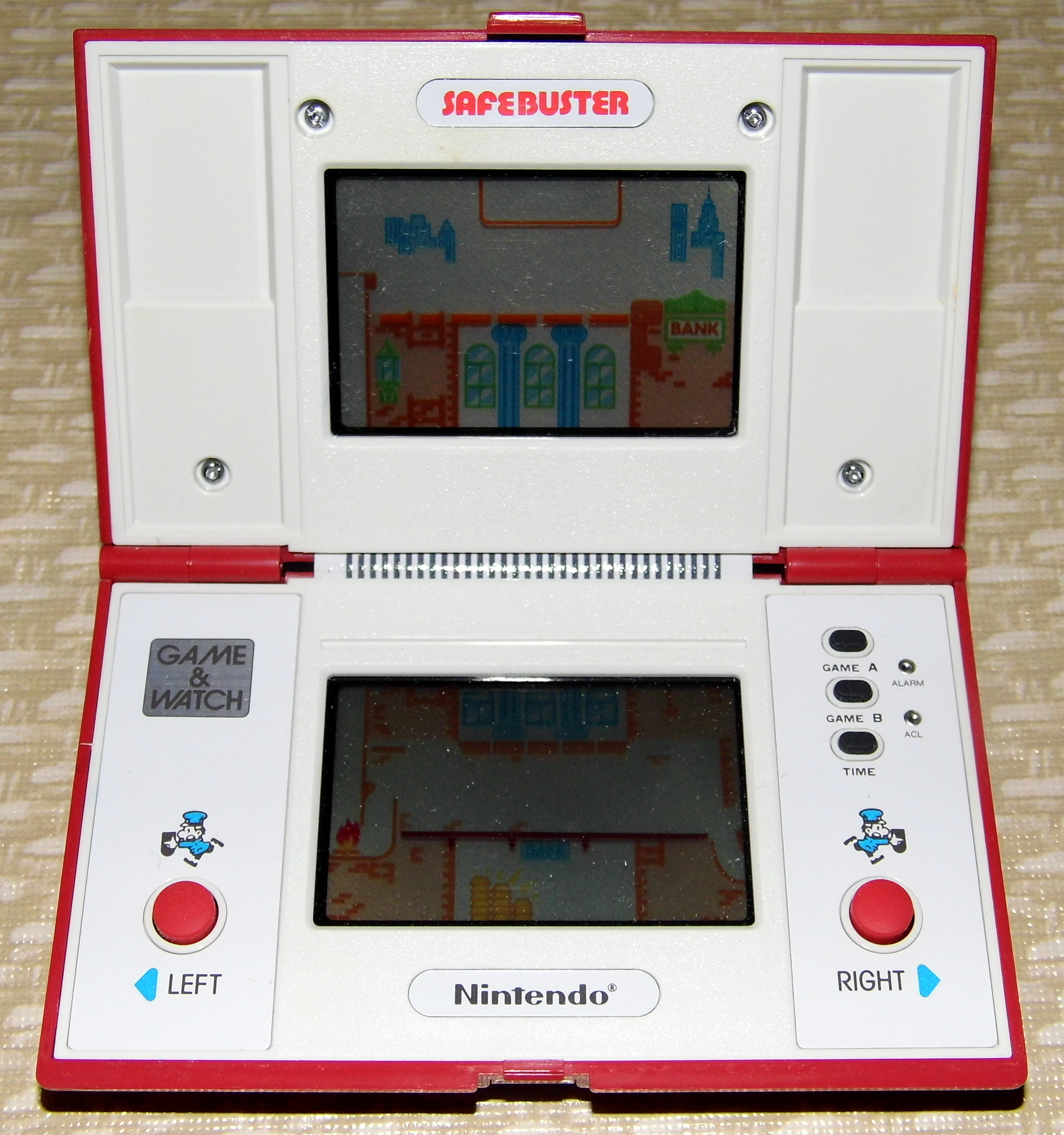
Safebuster

Safebuster was released in the Multi Screen series on January 12, 1988. It is a dual-screen single-player game with a clamshell case.

A security guard on the bottom screen uses a tube to catch bombs thrown by a bandit on the top screen. The tube is able to hold three bombs, which can be dumped down a chute at either side of the bottom screen for 1 point each. A life is lost for each bomb missed. The game ends when three lives are lost.

Safebuster was recreated in Game & Watch Gallery 4 for Game Boy Advance.

=== Gold Cliff ===
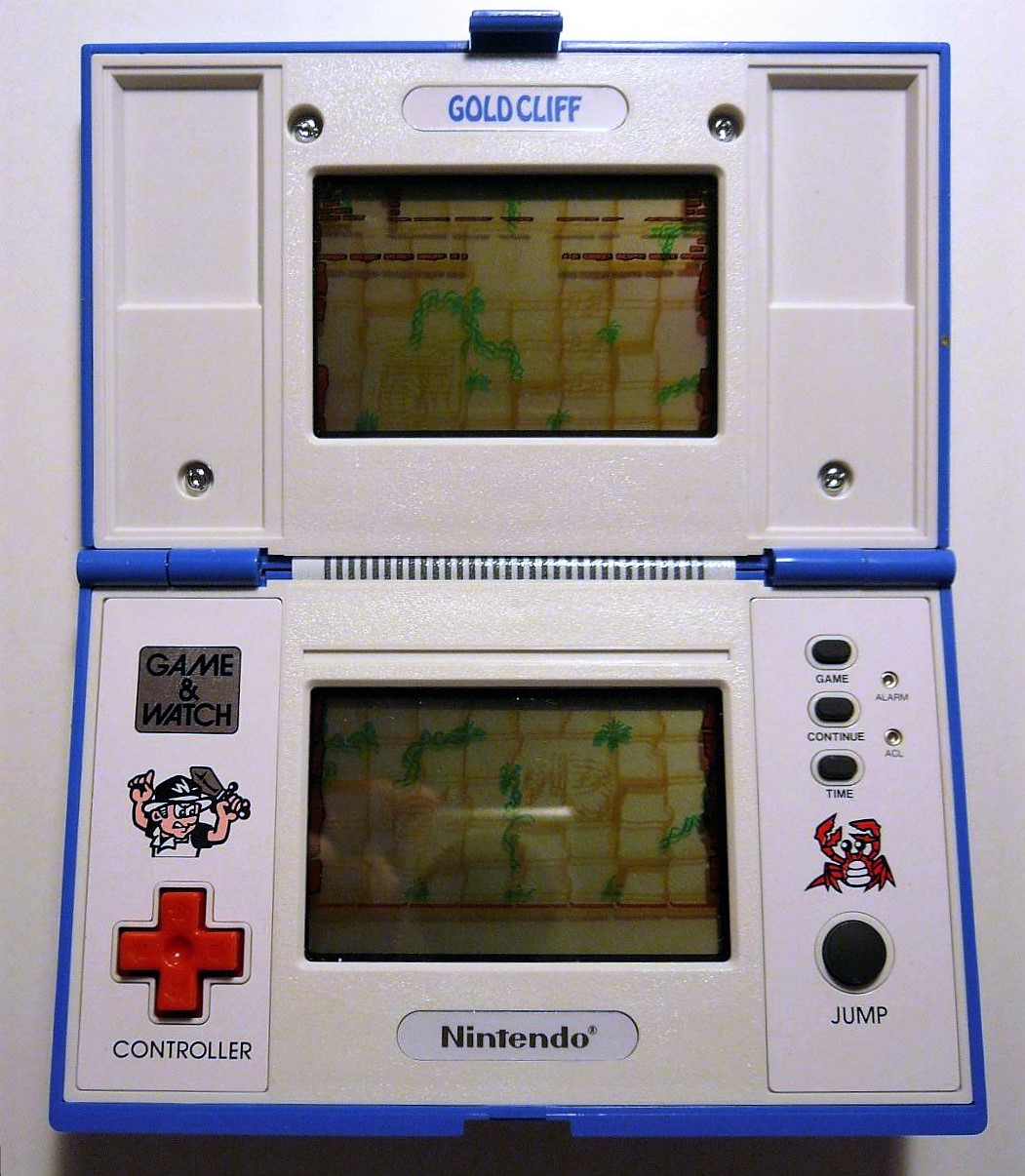
Gold Cliff

Gold Cliff was released in the Multi Screen series on October 19, 1988. It is a dual-screen single-player game. It has a light blue clamshell case with colorful printed metal plate on the cover.

The player controls an Indiana Jones-type archaeologist character who is on a mission to acquire treasure. Stone platforms appear and disappear in a pattern, and the player must jump across them to reach a key at the top of the screen and gain entry to the temple. Action speeds as the game continues. It was one of only two Game & Watch games that included a "continue" feature, which allowed a player to continue the game, with a loss of points, from the last place where they were killed.

=== Zelda ===
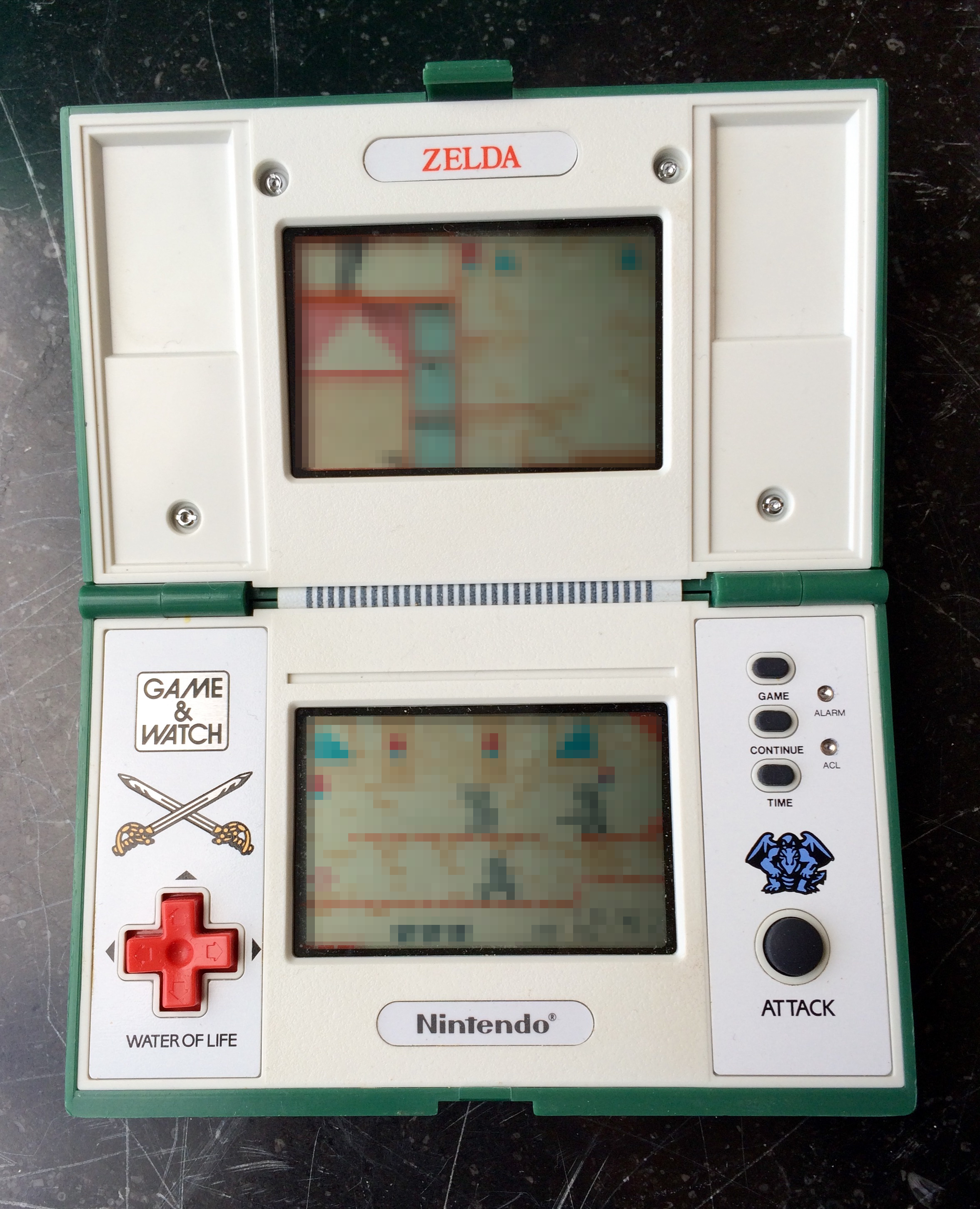
Zelda

Zelda was released in the Multi Screen series on August 26, 1989. It is a dual-screen single-player game with a clamshell case.

Zelda was recreated in Game & Watch Gallery 4 for Game Boy Advance. It was rereleased in the Nintendo Mini Classics.

=== Tetris Jr. ===
Tetris Jr. is a prototype in the Multi Screen series that was never released to the public. There is only one known copy in existence, making it the rarest of all Game & Watches. Like regular Tetris, the object of the Tetris Jr. is to score as many points as possible by forming complete rows from falling blocks of various shapes, but instead of positioning the falling block by moving it left or right, the players move the entire playing field instead. There are two game modes available.

In game A, a clown on the top screen throws randomly selected blocks of various shapes down a chute toward the bottom screen. The Rotate Button turns blocks 90° as they falls. The down direction the D-pad increase the speed of the falling block. The left and right directions on the D-pad moves the entire playing field.

When a row is completely filled, it is removed and points are awarded based on how many rows are cleared in one turn: 1 row – 7 points, 2 rows – 25 points, 3 rows – 100 points, and 4 rows – 400 points.

If the playing field fills up with enough blocks so that a falling block can not move beyond the narrow chute, the playing field can then no longer be moved left or right and the chute will fill with blocks until it reaches the top when a miss is scored. When three misses are scored, the game is over.

In Game B, the players have 3 rounds of 60 seconds each to try and score as many points as possible by forming complete rows. Every time they clear a row, points are awarded (similar to Game A) and in addition, a few more seconds are added back on the clock extending the time they have in the round. When the timer reaches 0, however, a miss is scored. The game ends after the third miss.

Tetris Jr. was recreated unofficially on itizso.itch.io and can be played with a controller, mouse, keyboard, or touchscreen.

=== Mario the Juggler ===
Mario the Juggler is the last Game & Watch game released in the New Wide Screen series on October 14, 1991. It is a single-screen single-player game. The gameplay is similar to that of the first Game & Watch game, Ball.

=== Super Mario Bros. 35th Anniversary Edition ===
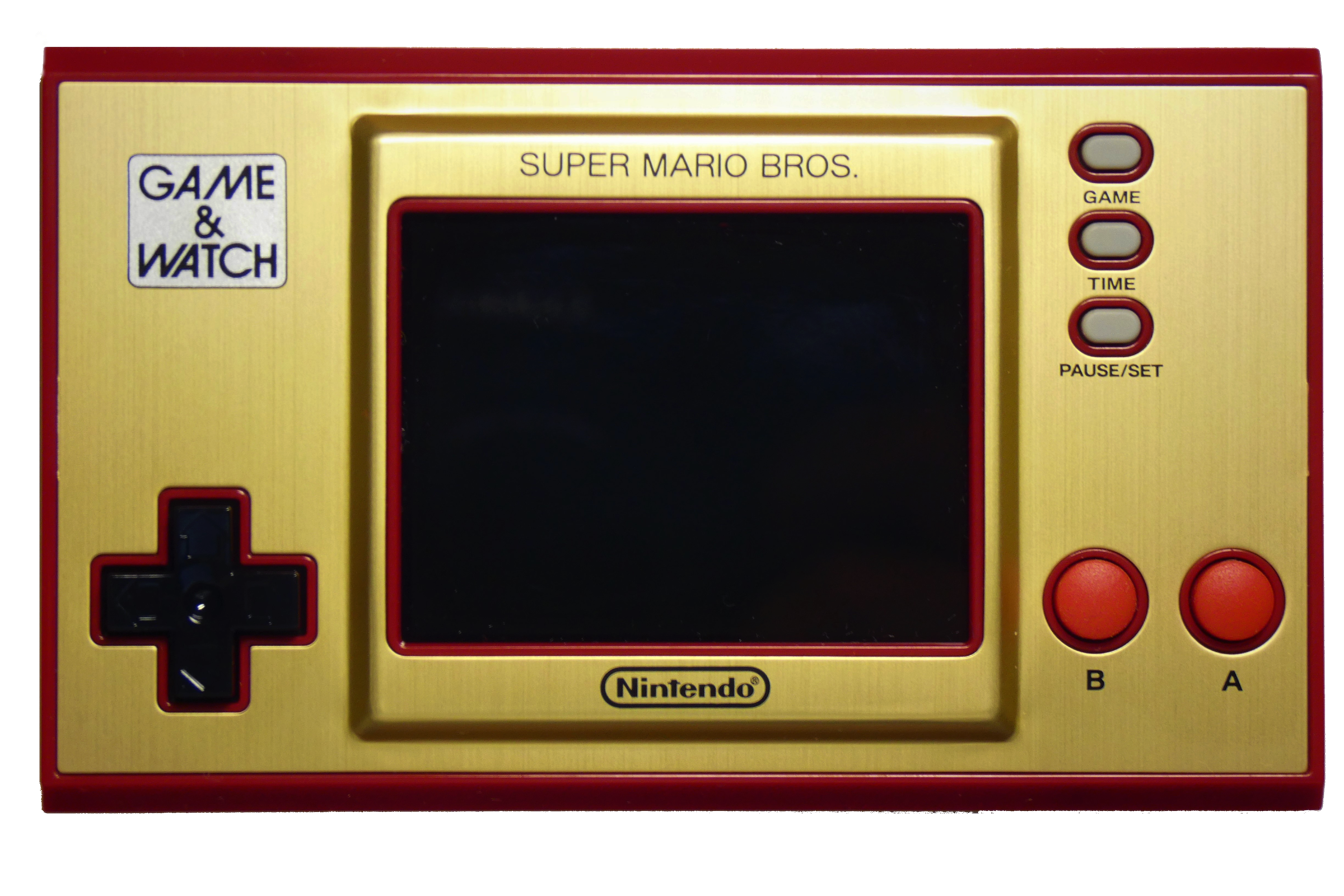
Super Mario Bros. 35th Anniversary Edition

This limited 35th Anniversary Edition Game & Watch version of Super Mario Bros. has a full-color pixel screen. It has several modes: NES versions of Super Mario Bros. and Super Mario Bros.: The Lost Levels; another new Mario-themed variant of Ball; and traditional Game & Watch clock features. The size and shape of the hardware is similar to the Wide Screen series, plus a cross-shaped D-pad like the Donkey Kong model. It was released on November 13, 2020.

=== The Legend of Zelda 35th Anniversary Edition ===
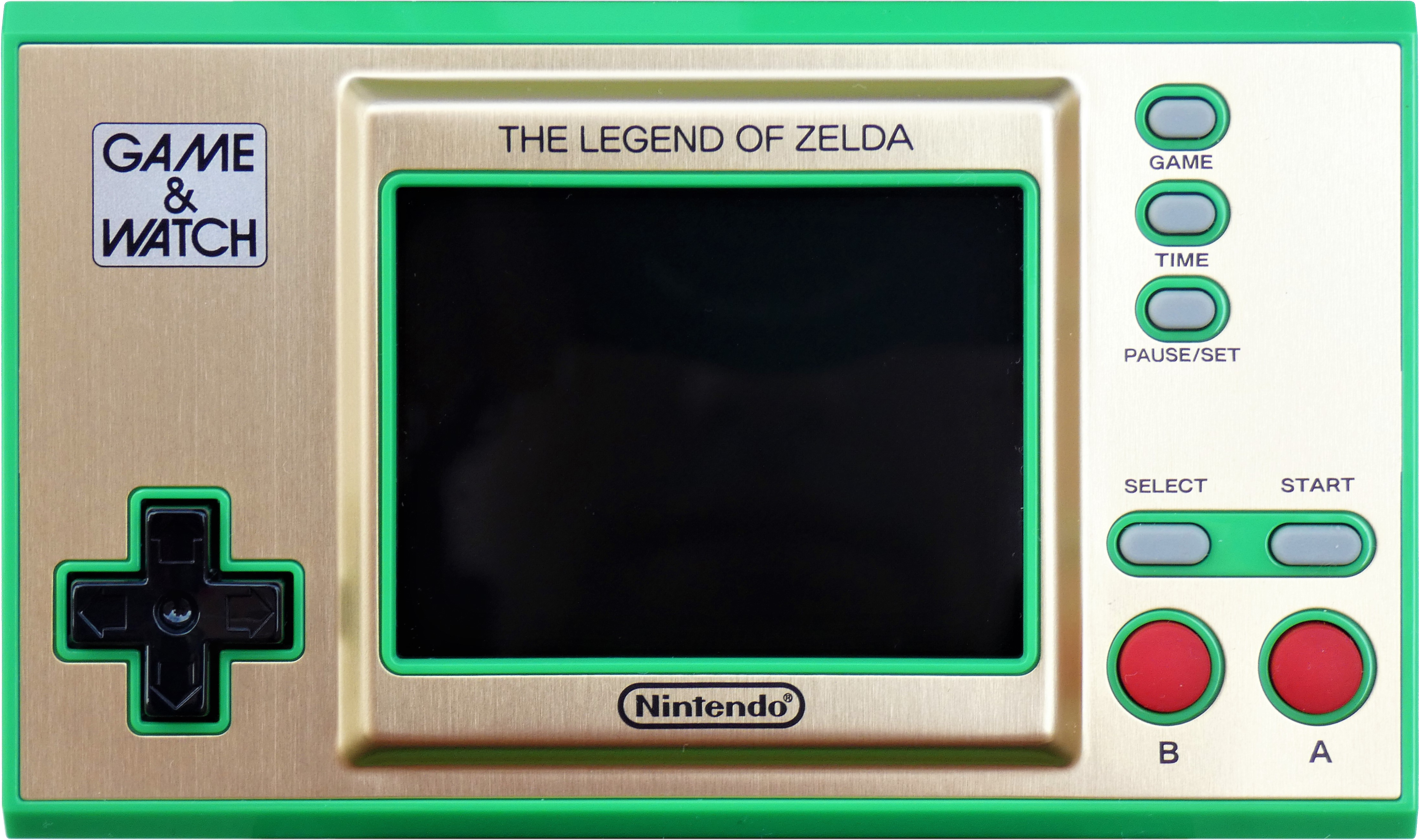
The Legend of Zelda. 35th Anniversary Edition

This limited edition 35th Anniversary Edition Game & Watch version of The Legend of Zelda has a full-color pixel screen. It has several modes that include the NES/Famicom versions of The Legend of Zelda and Zelda II: The Adventure of Link in various languages, both Japanese and international Game Boy versions of Link's Awakening in various languages, a new Zelda-themed variant of Vermin, playable timer and playable traditional Game & Watch clock. The size and shape of the external hardware is similar to the Game & Watch Wide Screen series, plus a cross-shaped D-pad like on the Zelda (Game & Watch). This edition was released on November 12, 2021.

== Compilations ==
=== Game & Watch Gallery ===
Game & Watch Gallery, known in Japan and Australia as Game Boy Gallery, is a series of Game & Watch compilations release for the Game Boy line between 1995 and 2002. Four of these compilations were later re-released via the Virtual Console service on the Nintendo 3DS and Wii U.

Beginning with Game & Watch Gallery (1997), each entry in the series includes both "Classic" and "Modern" versions of the featured games. The Classic versions aim to replicate the original Game & Watch gameplay and presentation, while the Modern versions reimagine the games with updated gameplay and characters from the Mario series. Not all included games feature both modes. The compilations often include supplementary galleries that document the history of the Game & Watch series. The first four entries are compatible with the Super Game Boy, displaying borders that resemble the original Game & Watch hardware when played on the Super Nintendo Entertainment System.

The series consists of five releases:

- Game Boy Gallery (1995): Released for the Game Boy only in PAL regions, it includes Ball, Mario's Cement Factory, Flagman, Manhole, and Vermin.
- Game & Watch Gallery (1997): Released for the Game Boy, it includes Fire, Manhole, Octopus, and Oil Panic.
- Game & Watch Gallery 2 (1997): Released for the Game Boy in Japan and Game Boy Color in western regions, it includes Chef, Donkey Kong, Helmet, Parachute, and Vermin. Ball is unlockable.
- Game & Watch Gallery 3 (1999): Released for the Game Boy Color, it includes Donkey Kong Jr., Egg, Green House, Mario Bros., and Turtle Bridge. Unlockable games include Donkey Kong II, Fire, Flagman, Judge, Lion, and Spitball Sparky.
- Game & Watch Gallery 4 (2002): Released for the Game Boy Advance, it includes Boxing, Donkey Kong Jr., Donkey Kong 3, Fire, Mario's Cement Factory, and Rain Shower. Unlockable games include Bomb Sweeper, Chef, Climber, Donkey Kong, Fire Attack, Lifeboat, Manhole, Mario's Bombs Away, Mario Bros., Octopus, Parachute, Safebuster, Tropical Fish, and Zelda.

=== Other compilations ===
Two additional Game & Watch compilations for the Nintendo DS, titled Game & Watch Collection and Game & Watch Collection 2, were released through the Club Nintendo rewards program in 2006 and 2008 respectively. The first compilation includes dual-screen games Donkey Kong, Green House, and Oil Panic. The second includes Parachute, Octopus, and a dual-screen mode combining elements from both.

Additionally, the Japanese-language software Kanji Sonomama Rakubiki Jiten DS (2006) features unlockable versions of Ball, Manhole, Judge, and Flagman.

Multiple Game & Watch games, including remakes in the style of Game & Watch Gallery, were planned for distribution via Nintendo e-Reader cards, but Manhole was the only card that was released.
