= Game & Watch Gallery 4 =

2002 video game

- North American box art representing the six default games
- Developer: Tose
- Publisher: Nintendo
- Directors: Hitoshi Yamagami; Yasuhito Minamimoto
- Producer: Takehiro Izushi
- Designers: Hisataka Ikoma; Akira Mochizuki; Erika Hara; Koutarou Shinoki
- Programmers: Kenta Egami; Takahiro Furukawa
- Artists: Yoichi Kotabe; Yasuko Takahashi
- Composers: Riyou Kinugasa; Kengo Hagiwara
- Series: Game & Watch Gallery
- Platform: Game Boy Advance
- Release: EU: October 25, 2002; NA: October 28, 2002
- Genre: Various
- Mode: Single-player

Game & Watch Gallery 4, known as Game & Watch Gallery Advance in Europe and Australia and Game Boy Gallery 4 in Japan, is a video game developed by Tose and published by Nintendo for the Game Boy Advance in October 2002. It is the fifth and final game in the Game & Watch Gallery series. It contains eleven remastered games from the Game & Watch line of Nintendo handheld games, several of which were featured in previous series entries, plus nine unlockable bonus games.

The game was initially only released in English-speaking markets; a Japanese version was not released until 2016 on the Wii U's Virtual Console service. The game received mixed reviews, with critics praising the game's presentation and accessible gameplay, but criticizing the uneven quality of the games and difficulty of unlocking its hidden content.

== Gameplay ==
Game & Watch Gallery 4 features eleven games based upon the Game & Watch brand of handheld games, five of which must be unlocked. Each game contains a 'Classic' mode, resembling the gameplay and presentation of the original Game & Watch title, and a 'Modern' mode, which contains additional gameplay mechanics and revised graphics based on the Mario franchise. Normal and Hard difficulty settings can be selected for each mode. The following 11 games are included:

- Boxing: Players compete in a boxing match, varying between high and low hits to break their opponent's guard. In the 'Modern' version, the player controls Luigi in fights against multiple opponents of increasing difficulty. This game offers two-player competitive play in place of a hard difficulty.
- Chef (unlockable): The player moves left and right to catch food in their frying pan to toss up into the air. In the 'Modern' version, the player controls Princess Peach and can rotate and turn on the spot to feed Yoshi. This game was previously included in Game & Watch Gallery 2.
- Donkey Kong (unlockable): As Mario, the player moves left and right and jumps to avoid barrels, making their way up platforms and ladders towards Donkey Kong. In the 'Modern' version, platforms disappear and levels change for greater variation. This game was previously included in Game & Watch Gallery 2.
- Donkey Kong Jr.: Donkey Kong Jr. must rescue Donkey Kong from Mario by jumping on vines and collecting keys whilst avoiding enemies. In the 'Modern' version, platforms disappear and levels change for greater variation. This game was previously included in Game & Watch Gallery 3.
- Donkey Kong 3: Players control Donkey Kong and Stanley, who use insecticide to try and push bees into the other's area. In the 'Modern' version, Stanley is replaced by Mario, and the bees are replaced by a fireball and Boo, the latter of which can move independently without being sprayed by the characters' bubble blasters. This game offers two-player competitive play in place of a hard difficulty.
- Fire: Players must use a tarp to catch civilians jumping from a burning building and bounce them to safety. In the 'Modern' version, different characters have different bounce durations. This game was previously included in Game & Watch Gallery and Game & Watch Gallery 3.
- Fire Attack (unlockable): Players must move between different areas of a base to repel attacking forces. In the 'Modern' version, players control Wario and must avoid hitting apples or hens to receive additional points.
- Mario Bros. (unlockable): Mario and Luigi must move a series of packages along conveyor belts and load cakes onto a truck without dropping them. In the 'Modern' version, the direction of the conveyor belts infrequently reverses, requiring Mario and Luigi to reset them. This game was previously included in Game & Watch Gallery 3.
- Mario's Cement Factory: Players control Mario, who must move between multiple floors to empty cement vats before they overflow. In the 'Modern' version, Boos will sometimes take up space in the mixers. This game was previously included in Game Boy Gallery.
- Octopus (unlockable): Players must retrieve treasure from a sunken chest while avoiding an octopus' moving tentacles. In the 'Modern' version, Mario's speed is affected by the amount of treasure he is carrying. This game was previously included in Game & Watch Gallery.
- Rain Shower: Players must move clotheslines to prevent their clothes from being struck by rain. In the 'Modern' version, Mario must protect bystanders from water balloons thrown by Bowser, which are color-coded to indicate their path.

When players accrue a certain number of points in each game, they earn 'stars' which can be used to unlock additional content, including the five unlockable games, a sound test, a chronological list of every Game & Watch game ever released, and new entries in the museum; up to five stars can be earned in each mode and difficulty of each game, for a total of 220 stars. Unlike the museums in previous games, which only displayed animations of gameplay from other Game & Watch games, Game & Watch Gallery 4 allows players to unlock these games for play. These games are only playable in Classic mode, and do not grant additional stars. The nine games that can be unlocked in the museum consist of Bomb Sweeper, Climber, Lifeboat, Manhole, Mario's Bombs Away, Parachute, Safebuster, Tropical Fish, and Zelda.

== Development and release ==
Game & Watch Gallery 4 was first announced during Nintendo's press conference at E3 2002. While Tose had co-developed the previous entries in the Game & Watch Gallery series, this is the first entry in which they are credited as such. One character sprite in the Classic version of Fire Attack was revised from the original due to its depiction of an insensitive Native American stereotype.

The game was digitally re-released via the Wii U Virtual Console in PAL regions on December 10, 2015, and in Japan and North America on March 16 and April 7, 2016, respectively. The Virtual Console release marked the first time the game was released in Japan.

== Reception ==
Reception

Aggregate score
Aggregator	Score
Metacritic	71/100

Review scores
Publication	Score
AllGame	4/5
Game Informer	3/10
GameSpot	7/10
GameSpy	61/100
IGN	7/10
Nintendo Power	7.6/10
Nintendo World Report	8/10
Official Nintendo Magazine	7/10

Game & Watch Gallery 4 received an average score of 71/100 from review aggregator Metacritic, indicating "mixed or average" reception. Frank Provo of GameSpot criticized the game's graphics and sound for being below the standards of other Game Boy Advance games, but believed that the addictive nature of the gameplay made up for those shortcomings. Craig Harris of IGN praised the amount of content included in the game, but considered some games in the collection to be much weaker than others and wished Nintendo had included more real-world history about the Game & Watch line. Kevin Murphy of GameSpy felt that unlocking the additional games was not worth the time and effort due to the difficulty of getting the required stars. Jeremy Parish of USgamer called the game one of the "essential" GBA games available on the Virtual Console. Nintendo World Report gave the game an honorable mention on their list of the 10 best GBA games, calling it the best in the series.
