= Manhole (video game) =

1981 LCD game

Game & Watch: Manhole
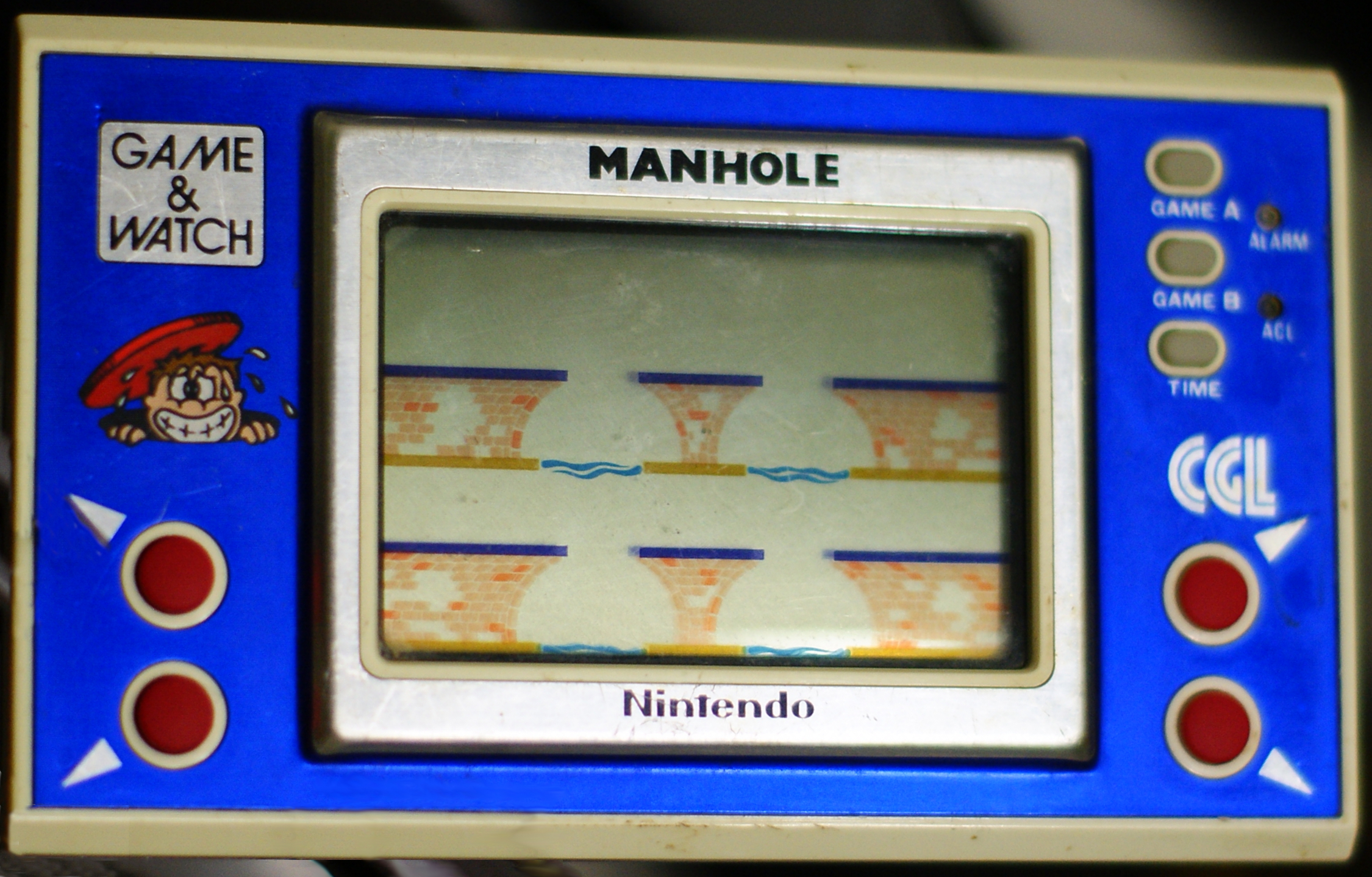
- New Wide Screen release
- Developer: Nintendo R&D1
- Publisher: Nintendo
- Director: Gunpei Yokoi
- Platform: Game & Watch
- Release: January 27, 1981; August 24, 1983
- Genre: Action game
- Mode: Single-player

Manhole is an action Game & Watch video game, one of six releases for the Gold Series of Game & Watch systems. The play field is split between two streets with two sewer openings each, and the player is tasked with holding a manhole cover to prevent people from falling in as they cross, with the difficulty increasing as the game goes on. It was originally released in 1981, before getting a new release in 1983. Like most Game & Watch games, Manhole was directed by Gunpei Yokoi, the creator of the Game & Watch, and was the second to feature color on the screen. Yokoi described the game as silly, a quality he hoped to achieve with its premise.

It has been featured in multiple collections of Game & Watch games, including Game & Watch Gallery and Game & Watch Gallery 4, the former which featured a new version where the player-character is replaced with Yoshi. It was also bundled with the Nintendo e-Reader for the Game Boy Advance, stored on a card that the user must swipe to play. Along with other Game & Watch games, Manhole was released as a DSiWare download for the Nintendo DSi. It was featured alongside Ball at a Game & Watch exhibit at the Nintendo Museum, allowing people to play the game using their shadow. It was among the more popular and successful Game & Watch games. Its gameplay has been found as fun by critics, though it has also been criticized for starting too slowly and being too repetitive.

== Gameplay ==
Manhole is a single-player action game where the player is tasked with preventing people from falling into manholes by using the single manhole cover they have, receiving points for each person who crosses safely. The game has four buttons, each connected to one of the four manholes, using the respective buttons to move the player-character into position. If the player fails to prevent a person from falling through, the player loses a life. Once three lives are lost, the game is over. If the player reaches a certain point threshold, they will get all their lives back. The game has two modes of play: Game A, which stays at the same speed; and Game B, which gradually increases in speed as the game goes along. The speed decreases in Game B every 100 points. The New Wide Screen version introduces the ability to double the points afforded per person crossing if the player reaches 300 points without losing a life. It also changes how losing a life works; in the original, when a life is lost, the game pauses and then resumes. In this version, the passersby on screen reset if one falls after it pauses.

== Development and release ==
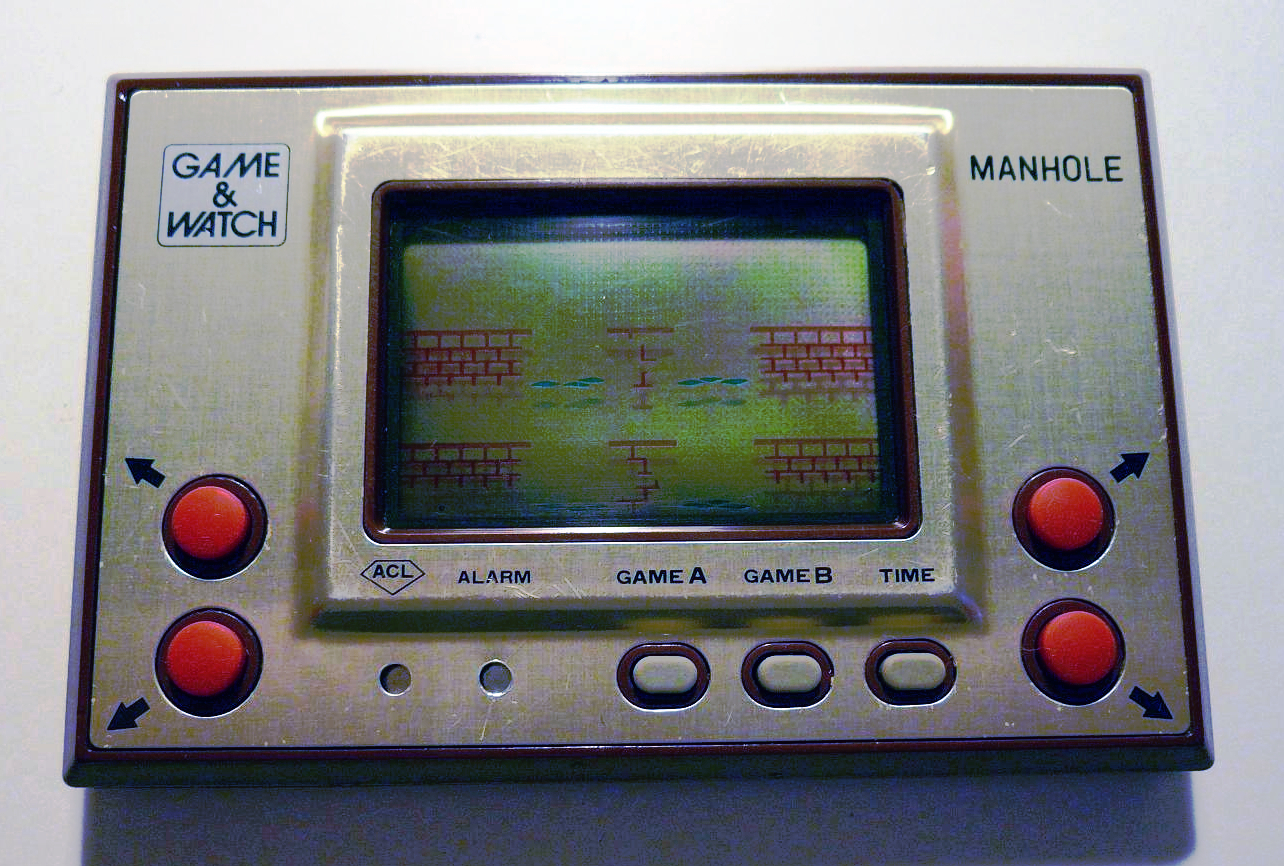
Original version of Manhole

Manhole was developed by Nintendo and directed by Gunpei Yokoi, regarded Manhole as one of the "little masterpieces" of the Game & Watch line. He described the premise as silly, a quality he aimed to achieve with Manhole. It was the second Game & Watch game to feature color on its screen. It has a clock and alarm functionality, and is the first Game & Watch game to have AM and PM displayed. Manhole was published by Nintendo on January 27, 1981, the first title released in the Gold Series line. The New Wide Screen version was released on August 24, 1983. This version has a bigger screen with new background graphics and more detailed art.

== Re-releases and legacy ==
The Game Boy game Game Boy Gallery, released in 1995, features multiple Game & Watch games, including Manhole. Game & Watch Gallery, also for the Game Boy and released in 1997, featured a remake of Manhole, where the player controls Yoshi, who uses his nose and tongue to prevent characters Toad and Donkey Kong Jr. from falling through. In this version, characters freeze in place over the pit for a moment before falling, allowing Yoshi to save them before they fall through. The manhole covers also stay in place for longer than in the original version, allowing more room for error by the player. Game & Watch Gallery 4, released for the Game Boy Advance in 2002, features an unlockable port of Manhole. It was featured as a hidden game, along with other Game & Watch games, in the Nintendo DS Japanese-to-English dictionary Kanji Sonomama Rakubiki Jiten DS.

An accessory for the Game Boy Advance, the Nintendo e-Reader, came bundled with a card that, when scanned into the device, would allow the user to play Manhole. In Japan, 10,000 copies of the card were distributed at four stores, including Toys "R" Us. It was the first of a series of Game & Watch cards that work similarly, which would be found in blister packs of randomized cards. This series would have included a collector version of Manhole that requires the scanning of two cards, which features Luigi as the playable character. These Game & Watch cards never materialized, leaving the original Manhole card the only one released. Manhole was re-released on the Nintendo DSi's DSiWare download service on August 19, 2009, and later in April 2010 in North America and Europe.

A Game & Watch exhibit was present at the Nintendo Museum, which allowed players to use their shadow to control one of two games, either Ball or Manhole.

In Super Smash Bros. Melee, the character Mr. Game & Watch was added as a playable character, who had an attack based on the game Manhole. A collectible item called a Spirit was added to Super Smash Bros. Ultimate based on Manhole. Manhole has been referenced in the WarioWare series, including a mini-game based on it.

== Reception ==
Video game designer and musician Kenji Eno stated that he was into Manhole when he was younger, playing it for hours at a time and feeling that it had an analogue feel despite being digital that he enjoyed. Digitally Downloaded writer Matt Sainsbury considered it his favorite Game & Watch game, among the first video games he ever played, describing it as entertaining and enjoying how "vibrant and cute" the designs were. He stated that it was a game he played for years since getting it as a child. Jeux Video writer Retrosaurus felt that it was nearly as simple as a game could get, though felt this was fine since the game was meant to be inexpensive and be a way to pass the time. They felt that it had rhythm game-like elements in its gameplay, believing that its sound effects helped enhance that feel. They found it an addictive game thanks to how the scoring system works, but warned it could be more repetitive depending on a person's taste. They praised the visuals, stating that the character designs helped give the game a "pleasant, childish atmosphere" which suited the premise of the game. Nintendo Life writer Desiree Turner begrudged how slow a session of Manhole was to start, but felt that the game became more fun once it sped up. She felt that the DSiWare release was a good way for people to experience the Game & Watch games for the first time. Eurogamer writer Kristan Reed felt that the Game & Watch Gallery version of Manhole resembled the "throwaway charm of today's score-chasing mobile games", calling it "daft as a brush". IGN writer Lucas M. Thomas felt that Manhole was a fun game when included as part of a compilation, but he could not recommend someone pay for the DSiWare version. He felt that, despite being a low price, Manhole did not offer enough gameplay to justify it, believing that the hectic gameplay wore off due to its repetitive nature.

According to Inside Games staff, Manhole was among the most popular of the Gold Series of Game & Watch systems and one of the most popular alongside Helmet and Octopus, described as a "huge success" by Retrosaurus. It was also one of the most popular New Wide Screen releases, alongside Donkey Kong Jr. Pocket Gamer staff attributed part of its popularity to the character designs, which they felt were funny and well done. Upon being released for the DSiWare download service, it was among the best-selling games on the platform.
