= Mario Bros. (Game & Watch) =

1983 video game

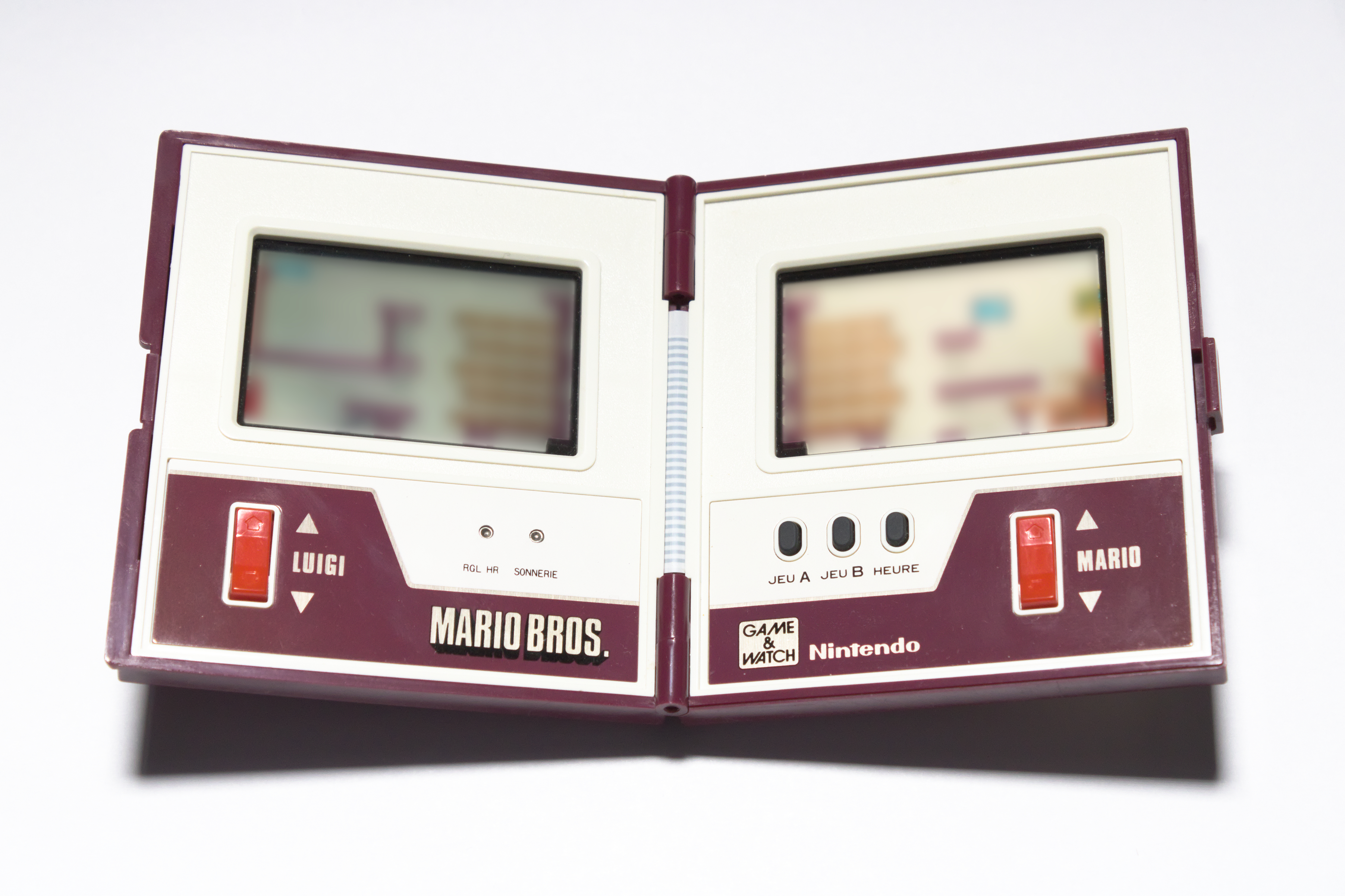
- The French-language variant of the console (Note: Due to copyright, the screens have been blurred.)
- Developer: Nintendo R&D1
- Director: Gunpei Yokoi
- Series: Game & Watch
- Platforms: Handheld electronic game Game Boy Color; Game Boy Advance
- Release: March 14, 1983; 43 years ago
- Genre: Action game
- Modes: Single-player, multiplayer

Mario Bros. (Note: Japanese: マリオブラザーズ, Hepburn: Mario Burazāzu; also known as Game & Watch Multi Screen: Mario Bros.) is an action Game & Watch video game, initially released as a dedicated handheld electronic game on March 14, 1983. The game was the first appearance of the character Luigi, who is the brother of Mario. The game features Mario and Luigi moving bottle crates between conveyor belts in a bottling plant. The goal of the game is to stack the crates into delivery trucks.

The original Game & Watch release received mixed reviews. The game has been subsequently ported to the video game compilations Game & Watch Gallery 3 and Game & Watch Gallery 4, and an unofficial sequel known as Mario Bros. II was released for the Commodore 64 in 1987. The price of the original Game & Watch console has increased since its release; in addition, the console has been on display in various museums around the world.

== Gameplay ==
Gameplay of Mario Bros., depicting Luigi (left) and Mario (right) moving bottle crates

The game features Mario and Luigi working at a bottling plant. A player guides Mario and Luigi up and down ladders using two rocker switches on the right and left sides of the console respectively. The brothers move bottle crates between conveyor belts which run between the two screens. Crates appear at the bottom right, and are moved in a zig-zag pattern on the conveyor belts to the top left, where they are placed into a delivery truck. When eight crates fill the truck, the brothers take a short break as the truck leaves, and an empty truck arrives. Two people can play by using the left and right switches, or one person can control both.

== Development ==
Luigi, as depicted on the outer front case of the console

Shigeru Miyamoto and Gunpei Yokoi had created the concept for Luigi, as a brother for Mario; Luigi's name was derived from the Japanese word Ruiji (類似; lit. 'similar'), as Luigi was originally a palette swap of Mario. Miyamoto did not help design the game itself. Due to the hardware limitations of the console, the characters were silhouettes in the game, as with all other titles in the Game & Watch series; on the outer front case of the console, Luigi is depicted in color, wearing overalls and a shirt.

The gameplay for the Game & Watch version of Mario Bros. differs significantly from the 1983 arcade game of the same name; two major differences were the use of two screens, and the setting being in a bottling plant instead of a sewer. The console was the first of three games in the Game & Watch series to use two screens placed horizontally, the other two being Rain Shower and Lifeboat; the consoles were held like a book. The console was intended to be viewed from right to left, like the writing direction of the Japanese language.

== Hardware ==
The console weighed about 146 grams (5.1 oz), and the console's dimensions when closed were 96 by 89 by 24 millimeters (3.78 in × 3.50 in × 0.94 in). The dimensions of each of the two screens were 54 by 35 millimeters (2.1 in × 1.4 in). The only inputs for the game were two rocker switches, with one on each side of the console. The console's components consisted of a single large-scale integrated CMOS chip, a crystal oscillator, and a liquid crystal display. The console had a built-in 12-hour clock, and an alarm which could be set at 1-minute increments. The console was powered by two LR44 batteries.

Game & Watch console hardware gallery
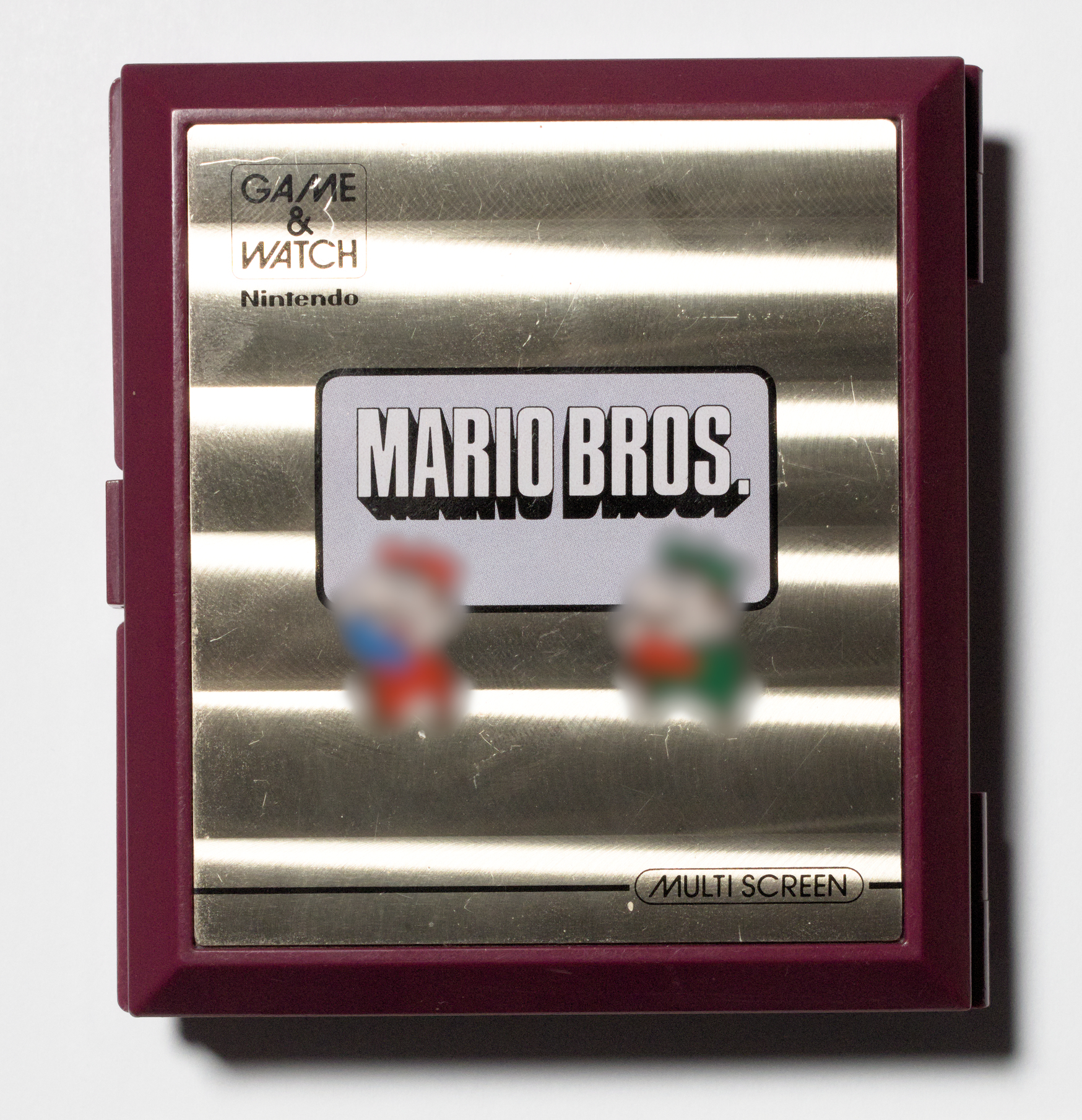
The outer front case of the Game & Watch console (Note: Due to copyright, the illustrations have been blurred.)

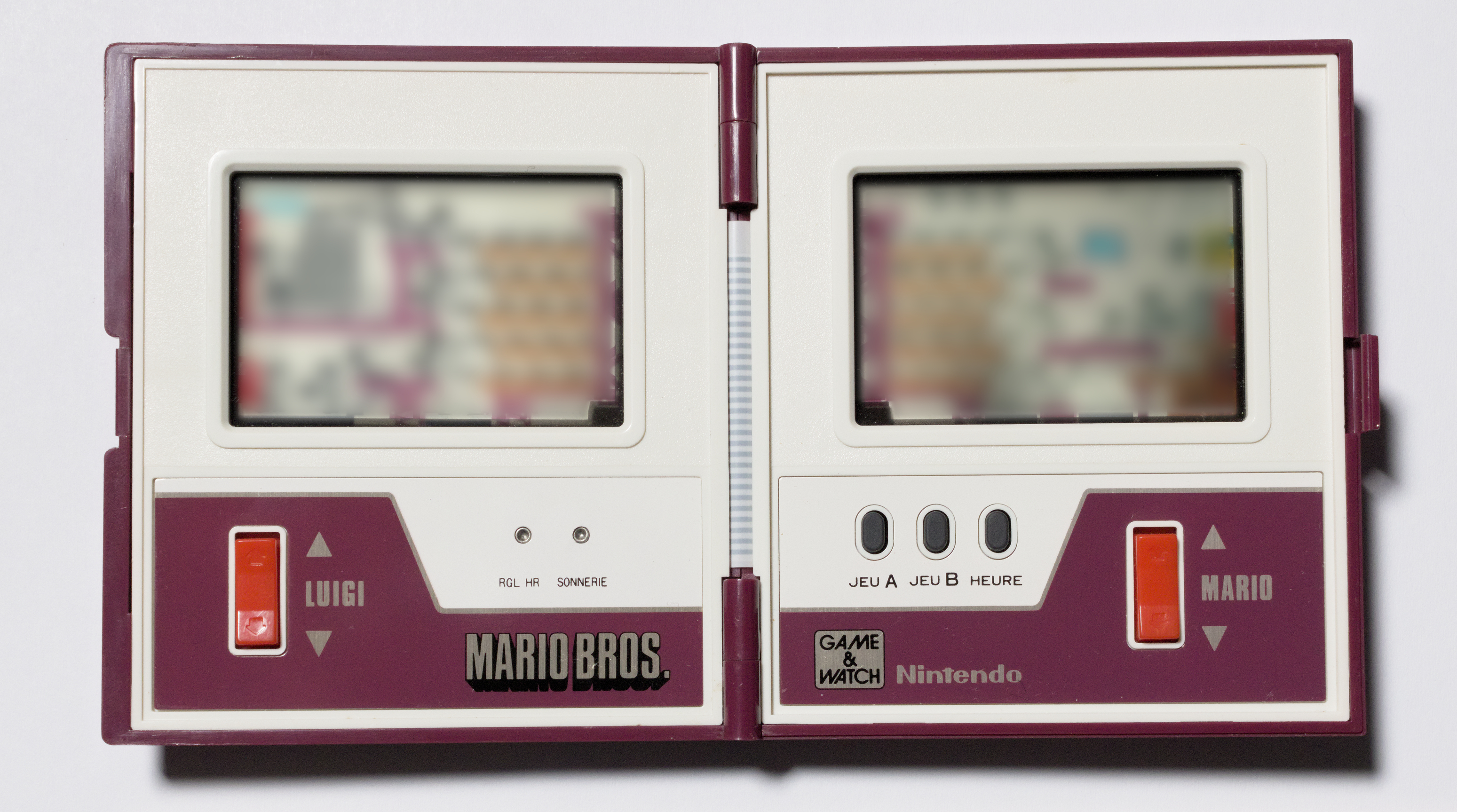
The Game & Watch console, turned on and fully open

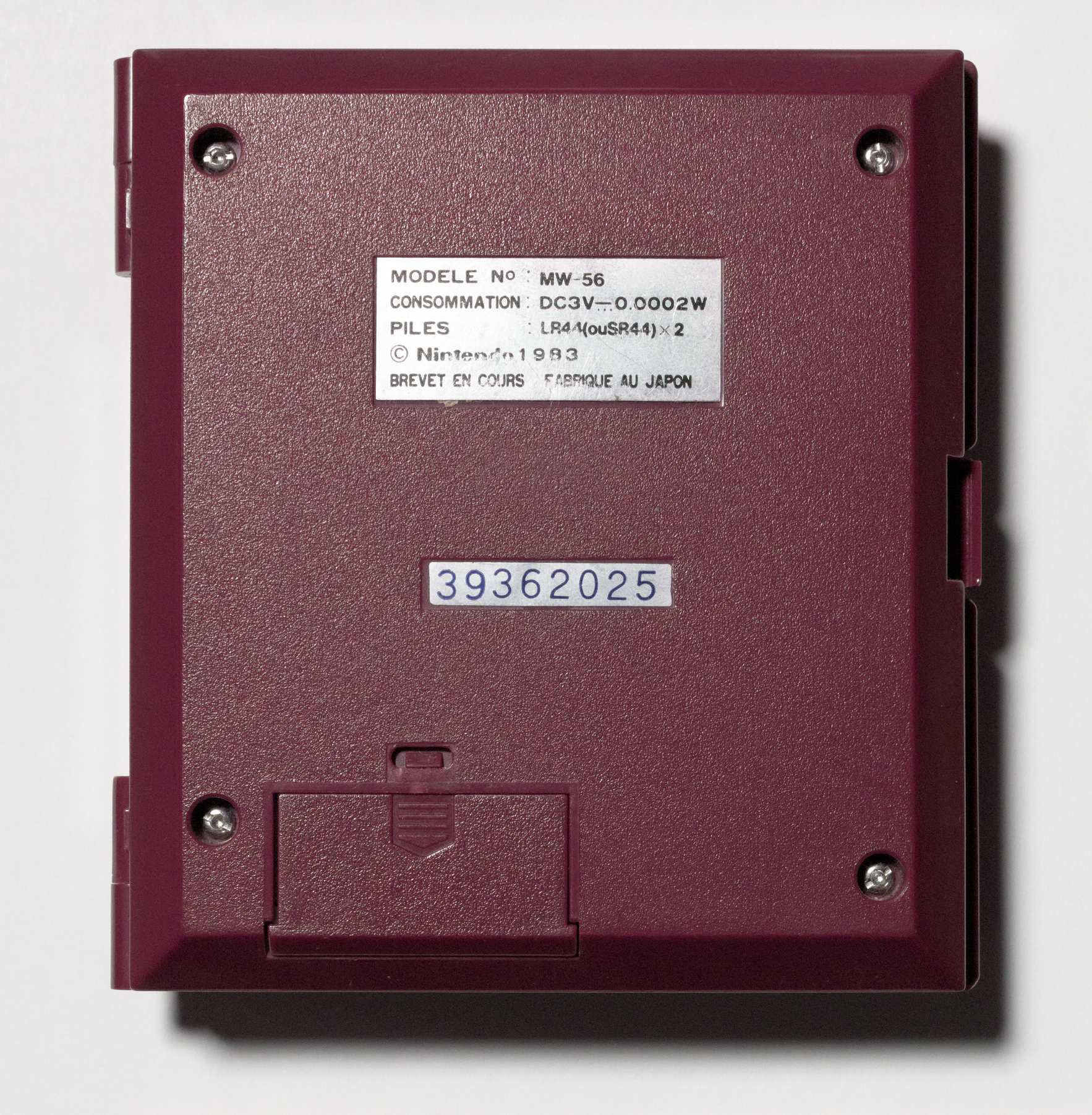
The outer rear case of the console, with the battery cover

== Release ==
The console was released on March 14, 1983, with about one million units produced. The game was registered in the United States Copyright Office on August 30, 1983. The console was Luigi's first appearance, predating the 1983 arcade game by approximately three months. The console was initially sold in Japan for ¥6,000 (equivalent to US$82 in 2025). The console was advertised in various magazines and catalogues in the United Kingdom until the 1990s, with a price averaging £20 (equivalent to $97 in 2025).

=== Ports and sequels ===
The Game & Watch version of Mario Bros. was ported to the video game compilations Game & Watch Gallery 3 and Game & Watch Gallery 4. In 1987, an unofficial sequel to Mario Bros. was released for the Commodore 64. The sequel, titled Mario Bros. II, was developed and published by Thundersoft. In the sequel, the appearances of Mario and Luigi differ significantly from other appearances of the brothers in Nintendo games. The game is played similar to the original Mario Bros., but the bottle crates have been replaced with cakes, and the brothers work in a cake shop instead of a bottling plant.

== Reception and legacy ==
The game received mixed reviews. A writer for the Chinese magazine Pocket Gamer said that the game was "seemingly simple but quite actually deep", and described the early character designs as "very appealing". Hiroyuki Maeda recommended the game in Game & Watch Perfect Catalogue, stating that the game was "hectic" when played with one player—comparing it to another Game & Watch game, Green House—and less difficult when played with two players. In the second volume of The Story of Nintendo, (Note: Spanish: La historia de Nintendo) Florent Gorges criticized the simplicity and pacing of the game, in favor of the 1983 arcade game. Jeff Ryan wrote in Super Mario: How Nintendo Conquered America that Mario Bros.—as well as two other Game & Watch games released in 1983, Mario's Cement Factory and Mario's Bombs Away—had depicted Mario in a "cartoonlike role ... trying to cope in any number of stressful environments."

The console has increased in its value since its release. In 2004, Mitchell Beazley wrote in Miller's Toys & Games that a console in its original packaging could be valued between US$75–85 (equivalent to $128–145 in 2025). In 2005, a writer for the British magazine Retro Gamer estimated the value of the console without its packaging was £25 (equivalent to $75 in 2025); a console with its original packaging was £70 (equivalent to $210 in 2025). Gorges wrote that the console was relatively valuable in comparison to other Game & Watch consoles; on a five-point scale, Gorges gave the console's rarity 3/5. In addition, the console has been on display in various museums, including an English-language version in the Victoria and Albert Museum, in the United Kingdom; an English-language version at the National Videogame Museum, in the United States; and a French-language version at the HomeComputerMuseum, in the Netherlands.

== See also ==
- Nintendo DS—a game console also made by Nintendo which used a similar screen layout
- Mario Clash—a reimagining of the 1983 arcade game Mario Bros.
