= Game & Watch Gallery 3 =

1999 video game

- European box art
- Developers: Nintendo R&D1; Tose
- Publisher: Nintendo
- Director: Hitoshi Yamagami
- Producer: Takehiro Izushi
- Programmers: Sakae Takase; Toshifumi Hiroo; Toru Fushimi
- Artist: Isao Shiroyama
- Composer: Noriko Nishizaka
- Series: Game & Watch Gallery
- Platform: Game Boy Color
- Release: JP: April 8, 1999; NA: December 6, 1999; UK: March 24, 2000
- Genre: Action
- Mode: Single-player

Game & Watch Gallery 3, known in Japan as Game Boy Gallery 3, (Note: Japanese: ゲームボーイギャラリー３, Hepburn: Gēmu Bōi Gyararii 3) is a 1999 video game compilation developed by Tose and published by Nintendo for the Game Boy Color, with backward compatibility for the Game Boy. It is the fourth entry in the Game & Watch Gallery series. The compilation includes updated versions of five games from Nintendo's Game & Watch line of handheld electronic titles, originally released between 1981 and 1983. Each game is presented in two modes: a "Classic" mode that replicates the original gameplay and visuals, and a "Modern" mode that features updated mechanics, enhanced graphics and music, and characters from the Mario franchise. As players progress, six additional "Classic" mode games also become available for play.

== Gameplay ==
A screenshot of the 'Modern' mode of Mario Bros.

Game & Watch Gallery 3 features five games based upon the Game & Watch brand of handheld games. Each game contains a 'Classic' mode, resembling the gameplay and presentation of the original Game & Watch title, and a 'Modern' mode, which contains additional gameplay mechanics and revised graphics based on the Mario franchise. Normal and Hard difficulty settings can be selected for each mode. The initial games include:

- Donkey Kong Jr.: Donkey Kong Jr. must rescue Donkey Kong from Mario by jumping on vines and collecting keys whilst avoiding enemies. In the 'Modern' version, platforms disappear and levels change for greater variation.
- Egg: Players collect eggs from chutes inside a chicken house, in the order that they fall. In the 'Modern' version, Yoshi eats cookies rolling towards him that cook as they move, earning more points if they are eaten when perfectly cooked.
- Green House: Insects are trying to destroy plants on two levels of a greenhouse, and the player uses bug spray to take out the bugs before they eat the flora. In the 'Modern' version, Yoshi defends the garden from other enemies, and has additional powerups.
- Mario Bros.: Mario and Luigi must move a series of packages along a conveyor belt and load cakes onto a truck without dropping them. In the 'Modern' version, an alarm rings that changes the direction of the conveyor belt.
- Turtle Bridge: Players deliver packages across a chasm using a bridge of turtles. In the 'Classic' mode, the turtles used as a bridge dive under water when fish approach. In the 'Modern' mode, Toad must hop across floating clouds while also collecting as many coins as possible.

When players accrue a certain number of points in each game, they earn 'stars' which can be used to unlock additional features, including a sound test, entries in an in-game museum displaying animations of other Game & Watch titles, and six additional games; up to five stars can be earned in each mode and difficulty of each game, for a total of 150 stars. The unlockable games include Donkey Kong II, Flagman, Judge, Lion, Spitball Sparky, and a unique version of Fire that features gameplay mirrored from its traditional format. These games are only playable in Classic mode and do not feature a Modern counterpart. By connecting to Game & Watch Gallery or Game & Watch Gallery 2 using a Game Link Cable, players can import the museum entries from those games into the Game & Watch Gallery 3 museum.

== Reception ==
Reception

Review scores
Publication	Score
AllGame	4.5/5
IGN	8/10
Game Boy Xtreme	90%
N64 Magazine	4/5
Nintendoland	89%
Total Game Boy	85%

Game & Watch Gallery 3 received lukewarm to positive reviews from critics, with praise directed at the updated graphics and additional features, whilst noting the gameplay limitations of the source material.

Craig Harris of IGN praised the game as the "best of the bunch" in the Game & Watch series due to its "many extras to uncover", whilst noting that the players would not "expect anything more than what they are – simple games for simple technology". Karen Hollocks of Total Game Boy preferred the "updated versions of the games with modern features and plenty of extra gameplay", observing that the classic versions only "hold a certain novelty value in an old-school kind of way". Writing for Allgame, Brett Alan Weiss praised the games as "perfectly suited to the Game Boy format" and the "number of features and surprises", although noted that the games are "limited in nature" and "inherently repetitious". In a less enthusiastic review for DailyRadar, Michael Wolf remarked that "while fun may be had, it only lasts for about five minutes before the playability of the games is worn out", although praising the game for its "secrets and surprises".
