= Nelsonic Industries =

Electronics manufacturing and development company

- Corporate logo, c. 1982
- Industry: Electronic watches, alarm clocks, wall and home clocks
- Founded: 1981; 45 years ago
- Headquarters: Long Island City, Queens New York City, New York, U.S.

Nelsonic Industries is an American electronics manufacturing and development company that operated from Long Island City, Queens, New York City in the early 1980s and throughout the 1990s when it was acquired by the watch-manufacturer, M.Z. Berger. Nelsonic produced numerous toy-themed wristwatches, often targeting younger audiences with likenesses of characters from popular franchises such as Barbie, the Ghostbusters, and Mario. Nelsonic became notable during the early mid-1980s for being the first electronics company in the United States to produce game-watches (multi-purpose electronic devices capable of functioning as both a time-piece and as a typically electronic game). For a period subsequent to its purchase by M.Z. Berger, Nelsonic operated as a subsidiary division of its parent company and game-watches were produced that bore the Nelsonic mark. This practice ended as M.Z. Berger shifted focus to more traditional and higher-end timepieces. Today the original Nelsonic Game Watch line has entered the secondary market and individual Game Watches have become highly sought-after collectibles that often fetch high prices on eBay and other online auction websites.

== History ==
Throughout its existence, Nelsonic produced pop-culture-themed wrist-watches for children and young adults. The chronograph digital watches, typically made of molded plastic, invariably featured an alarm and utilized LCD screens to display the time for their wearers. In time the company began manufacturing multi-purpose units that used the LCD screen to combine time display functions with simple video game functions. (Note: Although the use of the term "video game" is only possible in its loosest sense, it has been suggested that the term is properly used in the discussion of games (such as those produced by Nelsonic) that appear on a screen and that are analogous to the simple arcade games of which they are versions.) These simple video games were variations on the theme of the calculator watch, and the patent covering the Game Watch line is in fact classified as an "electronic calculator watch structure". The company's first game watch was called Space Attacker. Becoming the first electronics manufacturer in the United States to produce game-watches, Nelsonic earned a large share in this specialized market and was able to earn the attention of large video game companies at events such as the Consumer Electronics Show. Having caught the popular attention and with goodwill at a high-point, Nelsonic was able to obtain licensing from several big-name video game companies such as Sega, Nintendo, Midway Games, and Mylstar Electronics. With roots in the toy market, Nelsonic was also able to obtain similar licenses to produce LCD versions of popular electronic toys like Milton Bradley's Simon as well as to produce original LCD games for non-game toy franchises like Barbie, G.I. Joe, and Power Rangers and even for film and TV franchises such as Ghostbusters. So well-known became the Nelsonic brand that it was even able to license its own original games (such as the Nelsonic version of the public-domain blackjack which was licensed to Caesars Palace).

As time progressed, Nelsonic experimented with higher-end products such as metal watches and increasingly complex game-watch designs. In 1990 the watch-making giant, M.Z. Berger, made a large bid and was able to successfully purchase the company. For a period of nearly a decade after this acquisition, M.Z. Berger continued to use Nelsonic as a subsidiary branch and to employ the Nelsonic mark in the release of game-watches and the production of new re-releases of popular models from the 1980s and early 1990s. (Note: Under M.Z. Berger, the Nelsonic name was also used on various non-juvenile-market watches that lacked the video game element. One notable example is the Nelsonic Cache Watch which between 1996 and 1999, produced over $11 million in sales.) By the end of the 1990s, however, public interest had waned (quite possibly due to the rise in popularity of more advanced handheld video game consoles and, eventually, of other portable computing devices, such as PDAs and smartphones) and this practice came to an end as M.Z. Berger shifted markets to target higher end consumers more exclusively.

Today the Nelsonic mark is still in use for traditional watches and is not used in connection with game-watches. It is still a subsidiary of M.Z. Berger and as recently as 2007 it was listed by the AAFES as garnering over $1.9 million in sales.

== Game Watches ==
Below is a list of units sold by Nelsonic as part of their Game Watch line. Also included are game-watches sold under the term "Wrist Game" (e.g. Ghost Busters), "Action Watch Game" (e.g. Barbie).

Nelsonic Game Watches
Title	Date	Licensed by	Based on	Notes	Ref.
Barbie Tennis	1990	Mattel	Barbie		
Baseball			Baseball	Came with a separately detachable Nelsonic brand 5×16mm monocular to aid in viewing the small screen.	
Black Jack			Blackjack	Later re-released under license to Caesars Palace where it was sold in their gift shop as Caesars Palace Black Jack (also described as Caesars Black Jack on the box)	
Bo Bear					
Dinky Dino's Watch	1997			A digital pet game similar to the Tamagotchi, this Game Watch was also released under the name Dinopet.	
Donkey Kong	1994	Nintendo	Donkey Kong		
Football			Association football	This unit was simultaneously released in the United States as Soccer, and was later re-released in at least one other different style of physical layout.	
Frogger	1983	Sega	Frogger		
Ghostbusters	1990	Columbia Pictures	Ghostbusters	Also described on the box as The Real Ghostbusters.	
G. I. Joe: A Real American Hero	1990	Hasbro	G.I. Joe		
Grand Prix		Casio	Auto racing		
The Legend of Zelda	1989	Nintendo	The Legend of Zelda	Released in black, red, white, and pink versions. Released in Europe in December 1992 by Zeon.	
Major League Baseball			Major League Baseball		
The Maze Watch			Labyrinth	One of the earliest Nelsonic Game Watches, the game portion of this unit is a physical (non-electronic) Labyrinth.	
Melody Car Racing			Auto racing	Came with a separately detachable Nelsonic brand 5×15mm monocular to aid in viewing the small screen.	
Mighty Morphin Power Rangers	1994	Saban Entertainment	Power Rangers		
Ms. Pac Man	1982		Ms. Pac-Man		
Pac Man	1982	Midway Games	Pac-Man	This game retailed for between $25 and $35 and quickly became one of the most popular Nelsonic Game Watches, selling over 500,000 units. This unit was released with several different faceplate graphics and at least 2 different styles of physical layout - one with 4 directional buttons and the other with a small joystick that could be assembled.	
Poochie Watch	1997				
Q*bert	1983	Mylstar Electronics	Q*bert		
Race Car			Auto racing		
Sea Ranger		Aldo			
Simon		Milton Bradley Company	Simon		
Space Attacker	1981			The game was also released under the name Star Trek II: The Wrath of Khan by Collins Industrial Co., under the name Cosmic Wars by Majestron, and the layout was used in the pornographic Sexum Watch (another third party release). The game was re-released by Nelsonic in 1983 as Space Wars, and versions of the game exist in black plastic and metal variants.	
Star Fox	1993	Nintendo	Star Fox	The game was released by Nelsonic simultaneously in Europe as Starwing and was re-released with at least 2 different styles of physical layout. Some versions came with a headphone jack and headphones.	
Super Mario Bros.	1989	Nintendo	Super Mario Bros.	Released in white and black colors. Also released under the title Mario Bros. This game came with a headphone jack and headphones.	
Super Mario Bros. 3	1990	Nintendo	Super Mario Bros. 3	Released in black, white, red and pink color versions. Released in Europe in December 1992 by Zeon.	
Super Mario Bros. 4	1991	Nintendo	Super Mario World	Also described on the watchband as Super Mario World. This game came with a headphone jack and headphones.	
Tank Battle	1982			Also released under the titles Plane & Tank Battle and Tank & Plane Battle.	
Tetris	1990	Nintendo	Tetris	Very well received by critics. Released in black, white, red and pink versions. Released in Europe in December 1992 by Zeon.	

== See also ==
- Game & Watch - a line of LCD games produced by Nintendo from 1980 to 1991. This series is often confused with the Nelsonic Game Watch series due to the similar names (Nelsonic's "Game Watch" compared to Nintendo's "Game & Watch") and the overlapping subject matter (due to Nintendo's having licensed several of its popular franchises to Nelsonic).
- Elgin National Watch Company - another former watch-company that is now owned by M.Z. Berger and is thus a sibling subsidiary to Nelsonic.
- Waltham Watch Company - another sibling subsidiary to Nelsonic.
- Gruen Watch Co. - another sibling subsidiary to Nelsonic.
- Unisonic Products Corporation - another manufacturer of game watches.
