= Mario's Cement Factory =

1983 handheld electronic game

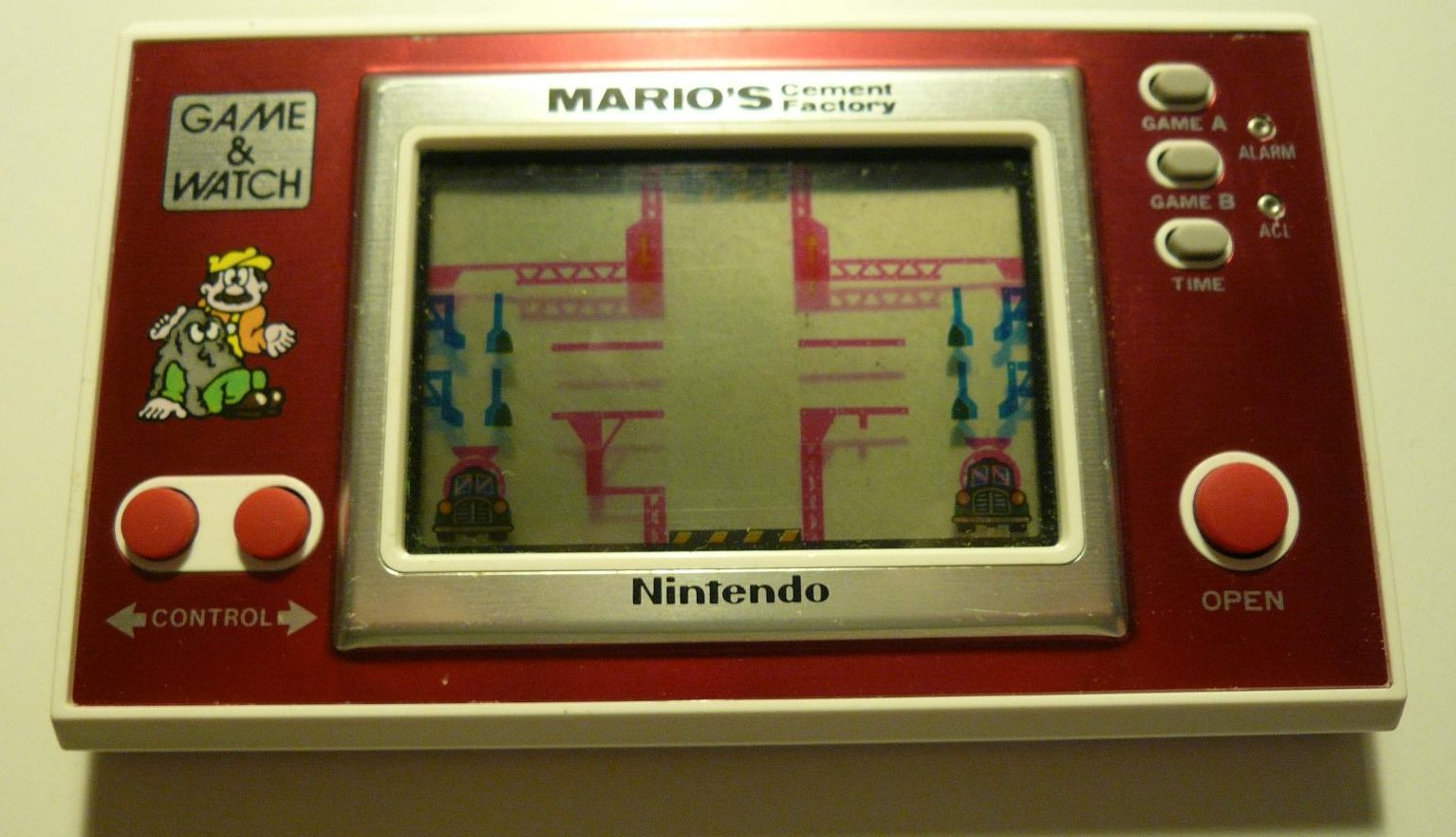
- Handheld version
- Developer: Nintendo R&D1
- Publisher: Nintendo
- Series: Mario
- Platforms: Game & Watch; Nintendo DSi
- Release: Tabletop; April 28, 1983; New Wide Screen; June 8, 1983
- Genre: Action
- Mode: Single-player

Mario's Cement Factory (Note: Japanese: マリオズ・セメント・ファクトリー, Hepburn: Mariozu Semento Fakutorī) is an LCD handheld electronic game developed by Nintendo and published in 1983 under their Game & Watch series. It follows earlier Mario games, like the arcade and Game & Watch versions of Donkey Kong. Players control Mario as he navigates elevators and funnels concrete through a factory down into cement trucks while trying to prevent the concrete from overflowing crushing his fellow workers. Two modes were released: a tabletop model; and a handheld version akin to most other Game & Watch titles. Development was headed by Nintendo R&D1, led by engineer Gunpei Yokoi.

The game has been re-released several times; it was featured as part of Game Boy Gallery for the Game Boy, Game & Watch Gallery 4 for the Game Boy Advance, and as a digital download for the Nintendo DSi's DSiWare service. It has been described by critics as one of the strangest games in the Mario franchise and one of the best Game & Watch games. Multiple critics believed it was among the most complex Game & Watch titles, as well as being among the best choices between the Game & Watch games released on DSiWare.

== Gameplay ==
Gameplay from the Table Top version of the game

Mario's Cement Factory is a single-player action game that puts the player in control of Mario, who works in a truck-loading dock at a cement factory, funneling concrete into hoppers, which must be emptied into cement-mixer trucks. There are two pairs of hoppers and trucks, as well as two elevators positioned side-by-side between two chutes that deposit concrete automatically. The left elevator can only go down, and the right elevator can only go up. The hoppers are able to hold three loads of concrete at a time, and Mario must drop the concrete from the top hopper into the lower hopper, using the left elevator to move down to the lower hopper to drop from that hopper into the truck. Every load of concrete dropped from the top hopper into the bottom hopper is worth one point, and two points for each load dropped from the bottom hopper into the truck. If concrete enters a full hopper, it overflows and knocks out the driver, causing Mario to lose a life. He can also lose a life from falling or being crushed by the elevator. The game ends when all lives are lost. At 300 points, all lost lives are erased; if no lives have been lost, the lower hoppers are kept open temporarily, ensuring that the player only has to pay attention to the upper hoppers. There are two game modes: A and B, the latter being faster paced and more difficult.

== Development and release ==
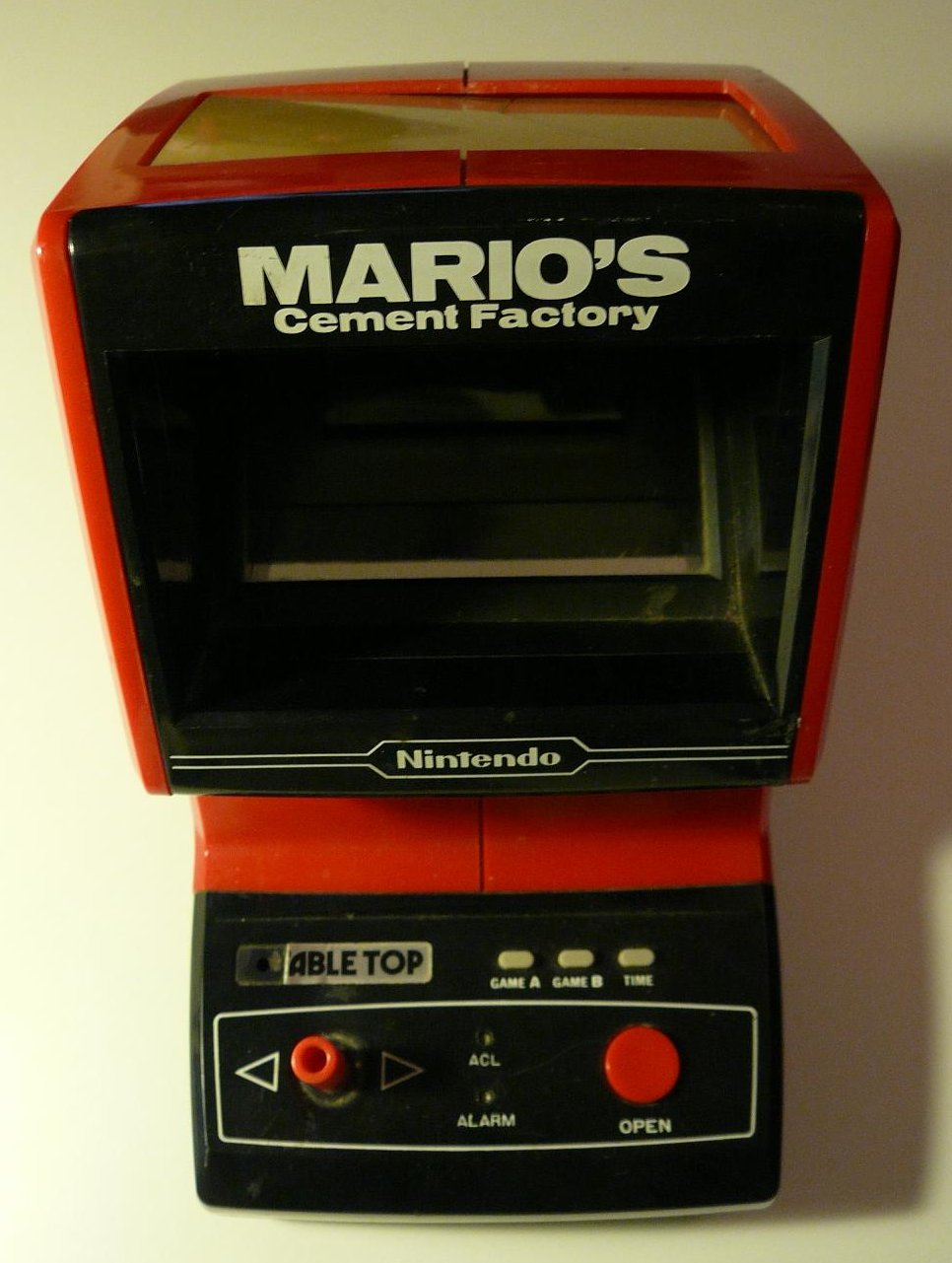
The original tabletop version

Mario's Cement Factory was developed by Nintendo R&D1, which at the time was led by Gunpei Yokoi, and published by Nintendo. Like all Game & Watch releases, each unit is a standalone portable device that doubles as a clock and can only play the one game. Hirokazu Tanaka composed the game sounds. The game was released the same year that Nintendo's Famicom system debuted in Japan, and two years after the first Mario title (the arcade game Donkey Kong). It was one of the first games to feature Mario's name in the title.

Two versions of the game were released. The first is part of the Game & Watch Table Top series and debuted on April 28, 1983. It has a full color illuminated screen, and approximately 250,000 models were produced. The game's graphics are accomplished through matrixing small images of elements from the game in conjunction with an opening in the top to allow the screen to be illuminated. These small images are drawn onto the screen, and the system requires a light source for play. The Table Top series did not sell as well, leading to Mario's Cement Factory being one of only four Table Top units ever produced. A smaller handheld version, part of the Game & Watch "New Wide Screen" series, was later released on June 8. It has a monochrome screen with a color overlay, and approximately 750,000 units were produced. It was one of eight titles released in the New Wide Screen series.

== Re-releases ==
Mario's Cement Factory has been re-released in various forms. It was included in the 1995 Game Boy Gallery for Game Boy, featuring updated graphics. It was also re-released in the Nintendo Mini Classics line, which repackaged Game & Watch games in small Game Boy-like devices. Both the New Wide Screen and an updated version were included in the 2002 Game & Watch Gallery 4 for the Game Boy Advance. In 2009, the game was re-released for the Nintendo DSi's DSiWare download service (along with other Game & Watch games). The DSi version was released in Japan on August 18. It was released in North America and Europe in March 2010. The DSi version was also given as a reward on Nintendo's now-defunct Club Nintendo service.

== Reception ==
Mario's Cement Factory received generally positive reception, called one of the best Game & Watch games by multiple critics. Multiple critics recognized it as one of the strangest entries in the Mario series, due in part to Mario's role as a cement factory worker. Following its DSiWare launch, it ranked among the best-selling DSiWare games.

MTV.com writer Jason Cipriano felt it was similar to the Game & Watch game Manhole, though felt that it had more depth and complexity. He felt it was among the best Game & Watch games released as DSiWare in Japan. IGN writer Lucas M. Thomas considered it a comparatively robust game for a Game & Watch title, believing it was the best value of the DSiWare Game & Watch releases and the best quality between them. Despite this, he noted that it was not a strong recommendation, as he took issues with the controls being too precise. Nintendo Life writer Corbie Dillard felt that its gameplay was diverse, which contributed to him enjoying it more. Despite admitting he may have nostalgia for it, he still had fun playing it. Electronic Games staff felt that the Table Top version was attractive thanks to the images drawn onto the screen, though stated that this is lost if the player is not using it in good lighting. Multiple contemporary reviews felt that it was primitive compared to modern standards, though Cubed3 writer Adam Riley felt it was worth the price, more so than fellow Game & Watch game Judge. Despite this, Riley felt it to be inferior to other versions of Mario's Cement Factory bundled in the Game & Watch Gallery games, both in terms of the value of the collection and the visuals.

== Legacy ==
The original units have become collector's items and, like many Game & Watch titles, a complete-in-box unit can sell for over US$100. The game was featured in a Gunpei Yokoi exhibit in Harajuku in 2010.
