= Ball (video game) =

1980 LCD game

Game & Watch: Ball
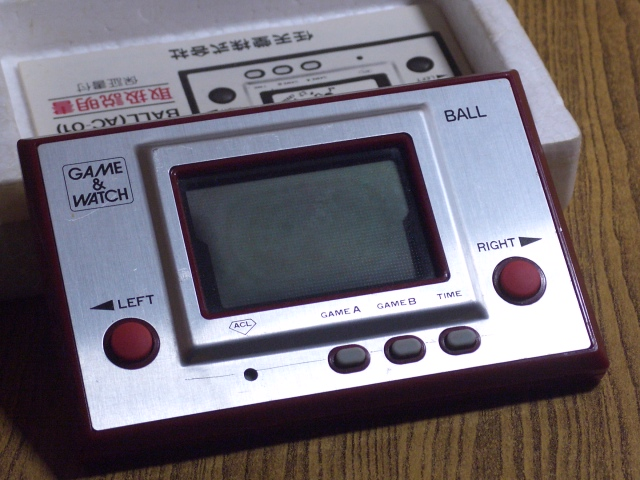
- The original version of the game
- Developer: Nintendo R&D1
- Publisher: Nintendo
- Director: Gunpei Yokoi
- Programmer: Satoru Okada
- Artist: Makoto Kano
- Platform: Game & Watch
- Release: April 28, 1980
- Genre: Action game
- Mode: Single-player

Game & Watch: Ball (originally known as Time-Out: Toss-Up in North America) is an action Game & Watch video game released as a part of the Silver series on April 28, 1980. It was the first Game & Watch game to come out and has been released a number of times over the years in various ways.

Multiple games and accessories feature Ball as an Easter egg, including the Game Boy Camera and Kanji Sonomama Rakubiki Jiten DS. It also received a remake in Game & Watch Gallery 2, and was released for the Nintendo DSi on the DSi Shop as an individual game along with several other Game & Watch games.

== Gameplay ==
Ball is displayed on a single-screen Game & Watch system, and offers players two ways to play it. In Game A, players have to juggle two balls at a time. As the balls fall, players must move the juggler's hands to catch them, earning a point for each successful catch. The objective is to continuously catch the balls that fall and throw them back up, and if a single ball is dropped, the game ends. In Game B, players must juggle three balls at a time, with each successful catch rewarding ten points instead of one. In addition to the normal gameplay, Ball also has a clock.

== Development ==
The concept of the Game & Watch was first conceived when creator Gunpei Yokoi saw someone playing with a calculator on the Shinkansen. He described the development of Ball as "lateral thinking of withered technology", which journalist Laura Crigger explains as meaning the use of "mature technology in novel or radical applications". LCD screens were both accessible and affordable at the time, and while people at Nintendo wanted to use technology that would increase battery life and be more expensive, Yokoi sought for it to be cheaper. Yokoi also elected to use button cell batteries due to being inexpensive and small. Ball was originally planned as a one-off concept by Yokoi, but then-President Hiroshi Yamauchi asked that he also come up with 2-3 more ideas for Game & Watch games. Yokoi felt Ball was difficult enough to come up with, but he agreed to do so. Ball was developed by Nintendo Research & Development 1 and published by Nintendo. Game designer Makoto Kano worked on the visuals and LCD design, and when he joined development of Ball, Yokoi and former Nintendo Research & Engineering general manager Satoru Okada had already begun work on the game's prototype.

The Ball Game & Watch unit was designed with a chip that is capable of displaying segments which can be turned on or off. The upper-right-hand corner of the screen has a score and time display, which uses 28 segments of the system in total. The remaining 44 segments were used to display the actual gameplay. The decision to display the time was made at the end of development, which Kano speculated was an afterthought due to the lack of a colon in the display, though he also speculated that it may have been to save on segment use. The Game & Watch unit used a crystal oscillator to add the clock. They intentionally capped the score at 1999 to be able to use the segments as efficiently as possible. When designing Ball and other Game & Watch games, it was important to the designers that players feel like missing the ball did not seem unfair. To do this, they tried to design the game in such a way that what could be perceived as a miss is recognized as a success. The LCD display prevented multiple games from being made as part of one Game & Watch. To alleviate this issue, the designers opted to have two modes of play to increase the game's value. One quirk of the hardware is that wiring is sticking out on the left and right sides of the screen. To hide this, the team printed black bars and added them on both sides of the screen.

== Release ==
Ball was the first Game & Watch game, launching on April 28, 1980 in the Silver series of Game & Watch systems. The Silver series was named for both the silver handheld color as well as the LCD screen, and four other Game & Watch games were released in this series. It was originally called Toss-Up in North America. An approximate total of 250,000 units were produced.

Yokoi noted that the release of three Game & Watch titles in short succession, as well as how much they sold, created expectations which more would follow, resulting in yet more Game & Watch games being developed.

=== Re-releases and compilations ===
Ball has been re-released in a variety of different forms. The final Game & Watch game, Mario the Juggler, released in October 1991 as part of the New Widescreen series, was a remake of Ball. The visuals were updated to be in color and have details from Mario video games, including Mario being the featured character. Unlike the original Ball, the player was allowed to make three mistakes before losing. A new feature had a Hammer Brother and Lakitu juggling objects between each other, which sometimes are aimed at Mario. It was not available for purchase in Japan.

Ball was recreated in Game Boy Gallery for Game Boy and Game & Watch Gallery 2 for Game Boy Color. Ball was one of several unreleased Game & Watch cards for the Game Boy Advance e-Reader accessory. It was recreated as a DSiWare game that was released for Nintendo DSi on July 15, 2009 in Japan, and in April 2010 for the United States and Europe. The DSiWare version was later made available on the Nintendo 3DS eShop on July 7, 2011 in Europe. It also appears as a minigame for the Game Boy Camera, where players can paste images of their own face over that of the juggler. Ball can also be found, among other Game & Watch games, in the Japanese-to-English dictionary title Kanji Sonomama Rakubiki Jiten DS.

It was re-released exclusively via Club Nintendo to celebrate the 30th anniversary of Game & Watch, with the Club Nintendo logo on the back. Unlike the original release, this version includes an option to mute the game by pressing the Time button during gameplay. Kano was a central figure in the development of the Club Nintendo version, who described it as "[holding] a special place in Yokoi-san's heart" and being the basis for all future Game & Watch games. There were some challenges involved according to Kano, due to documents relating to the original game's design no longer being available or difficult to find, despite the game having been recreated in the Game & Watch Gallery series. Another complication was that the hardware used to make Game & Watch systems back in the 1980s are not available anymore. Kano also cited poor memory as a complication, being unable to explain why a certain part is designed a particular way in some cases. He made efforts to recreate the experience of holding the original unit as much as he possibly could in terms of how it feels to hold, how it sounds, and how the buttons feel. Newer LCD screens would not show the wiring, meaning that the black bars on the screen were no longer necessary, but they were kept for the sake of making the design more authentic.

For members of the Japanese Club Nintendo, it was shipped in April 2010 to Platinum members. It became available for members of the North American Club Nintendo in February 2011 and for European Club Nintendo members in November of the same year.

More recently, a Super Mario Bros.-themed Game & Watch system was released on November 13, 2020. In addition to featuring the original Super Mario Bros. and the sequel, Super Mario Bros.: The Lost Levels, it also featured a version of Ball reskinned to have a Mario head in place of the undistinguished character.

At the Nintendo Museum in Japan, a playable version of Ball was featured, where the player uses their shadow cast on a wall to "catch" balls with their hands, which react to the hands' shadows' position.

== Reception ==
Ball received generally mixed reception from contemporary critics. An article by Nintendo Life called it basic in comparison to later Game & Watch games, referring to the gameplay as "unsophisticated" and the LCD characters as "crude". He also noted the similarity between Ball and the later Game & Watch game Mario the Juggler. Fellow Nintendo Life writer Jon Wahlgren was highly critical of the DSiWare release of Ball, finding the gameplay and concept uninteresting. He felt that the only value was for people interested in it from a historical point of view. IGN writer Lucas M. Thomas was also critical of this release, saying that while the game may be the "most nostalgic" Game & Watch game, it was not worth the price it was being sold for on the DSi Shop due to how simple it is. MTV writer Jason Cipriano felt it got boring quickly, but appreciated the opportunity to experience the original Game & Watch game to see how the series progressed. On the other hand, an author for Digitally Downloaded felt that, despite the simplicity, they loved it due to representing Nintendo's creativity. In 2021, ITMedia conducted a survey on the most popular Game & Watch titles, where readers voted it among their favorite titles.

In a review of the Super Mario Bros. version, Gizmodo writer Andrew Liszewski felt that the unit had "nostalgic charm", but it quickly wore off, stating he would likely never play it again. He also felt that the unit itself was overpriced, citing how one of the games - Ball - was particularly basic. Den of Geek writer Aaron Potter agreed that it was simple, but still found it fun to play, if only for a short time. He appreciated how, despite changing the character to Mario, it still felt authentic.
