= List of LCD games featuring Mario =

Video games

Nintendo has released several Mario and Donkey Kong LCD video games for the Game & Watch series.

== Game & Watch games ==
=== Donkey Kong ===
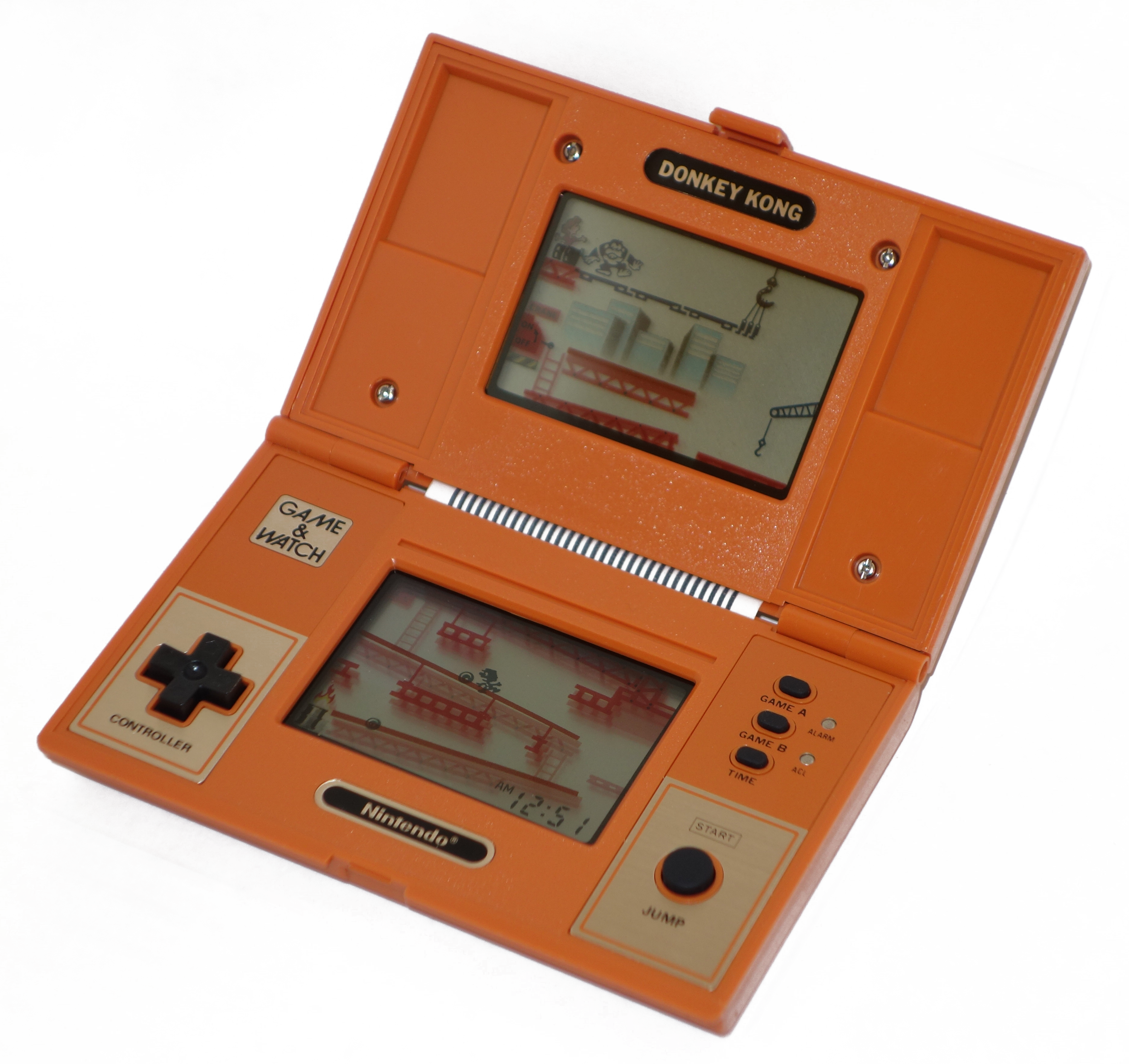
Nintendo Donkey Kong Game and Watch

Donkey Kong was developed by Nintendo R&D1 as part of the Game & Watch Multi Screen series, featuring two LCD screens. Released in 1982, it is a port of the arcade game, where Mario is a carpenter attempting to rescue his girlfriend from an evil, or at least angry, ape. The device is Nintendo's earliest use of their cross-shaped D-pad.

Like the arcade Donkey Kong, Mario must climb a building while avoiding barrels, but beating the game is different from the arcade version. The player must trigger a lever on the upper screen, activating a hook, which Mario must then jump and catch. If the player succeeds, a peg will be removed and Mario will return to the starting point, but if the player does not, Mario will fall to the ground and lose a life. Removing all available pegs in this manner will cause Donkey Kong's platform to collapse, and he will fall to the ground.

A remake of the game was later featured in Game & Watch Gallery 2 (1997) and 4 (2002).

=== Donkey Kong Jr. ===
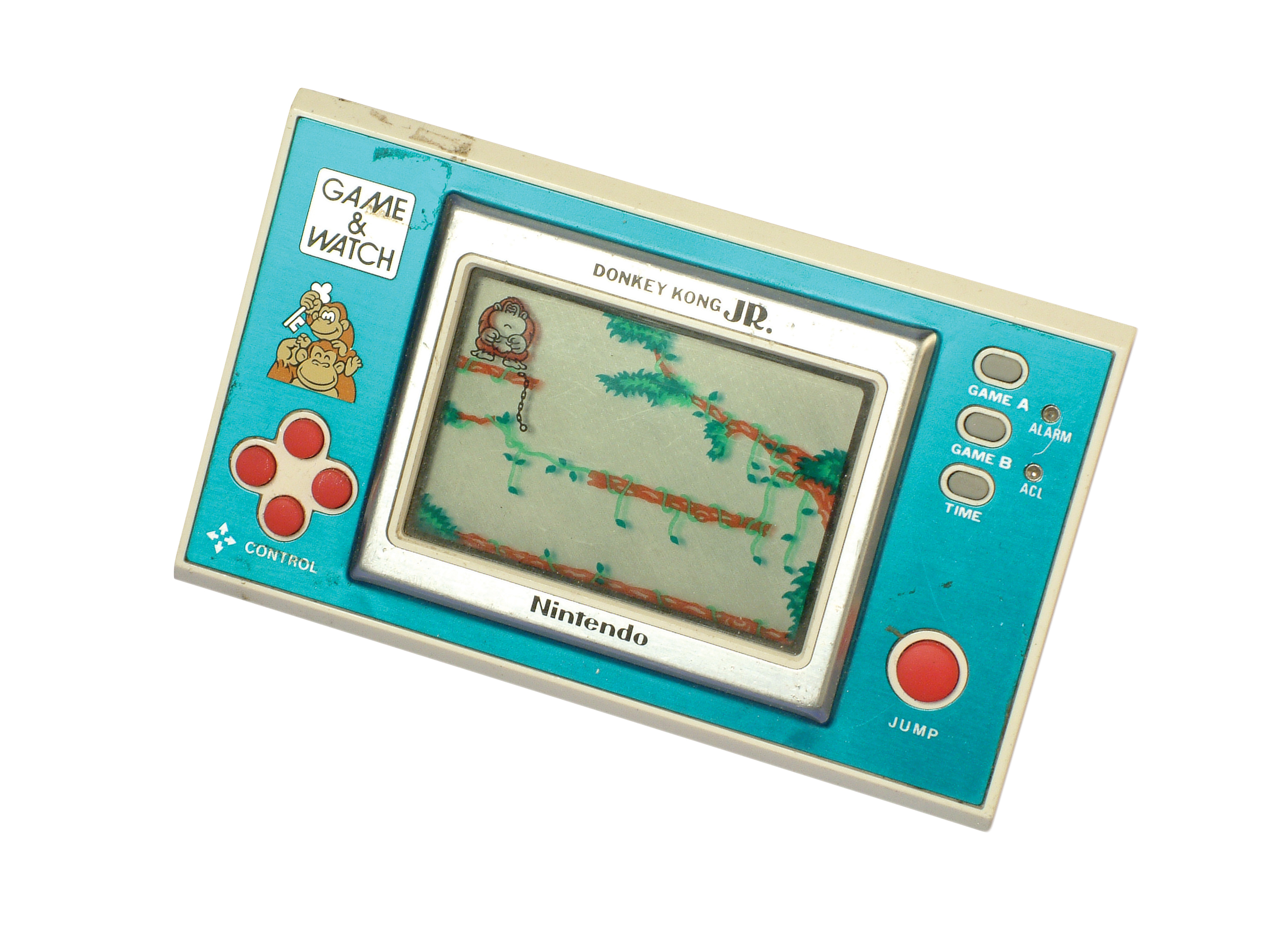
Nintendo Donkey Kong Jr. Game and Watch

In this 1982 game, the player controls Donkey Kong Jr. as he works to save his father, Donkey Kong, while watching out for obstacles like crocodiles, birds, and electric flashes. The game was released as part of the Mini-Classics series in 1998 (a set of four Game & Watch games ported to small keychain-bound handhelds), and was later included in Game & Watch Gallery 3 (2000) and 4 (2002), and as DSiWare game in 2010.

In this game, Mario gives payback to Donkey Kong for stealing his girlfriend, Pauline, by locking him up in a cage.

=== Donkey Kong II ===
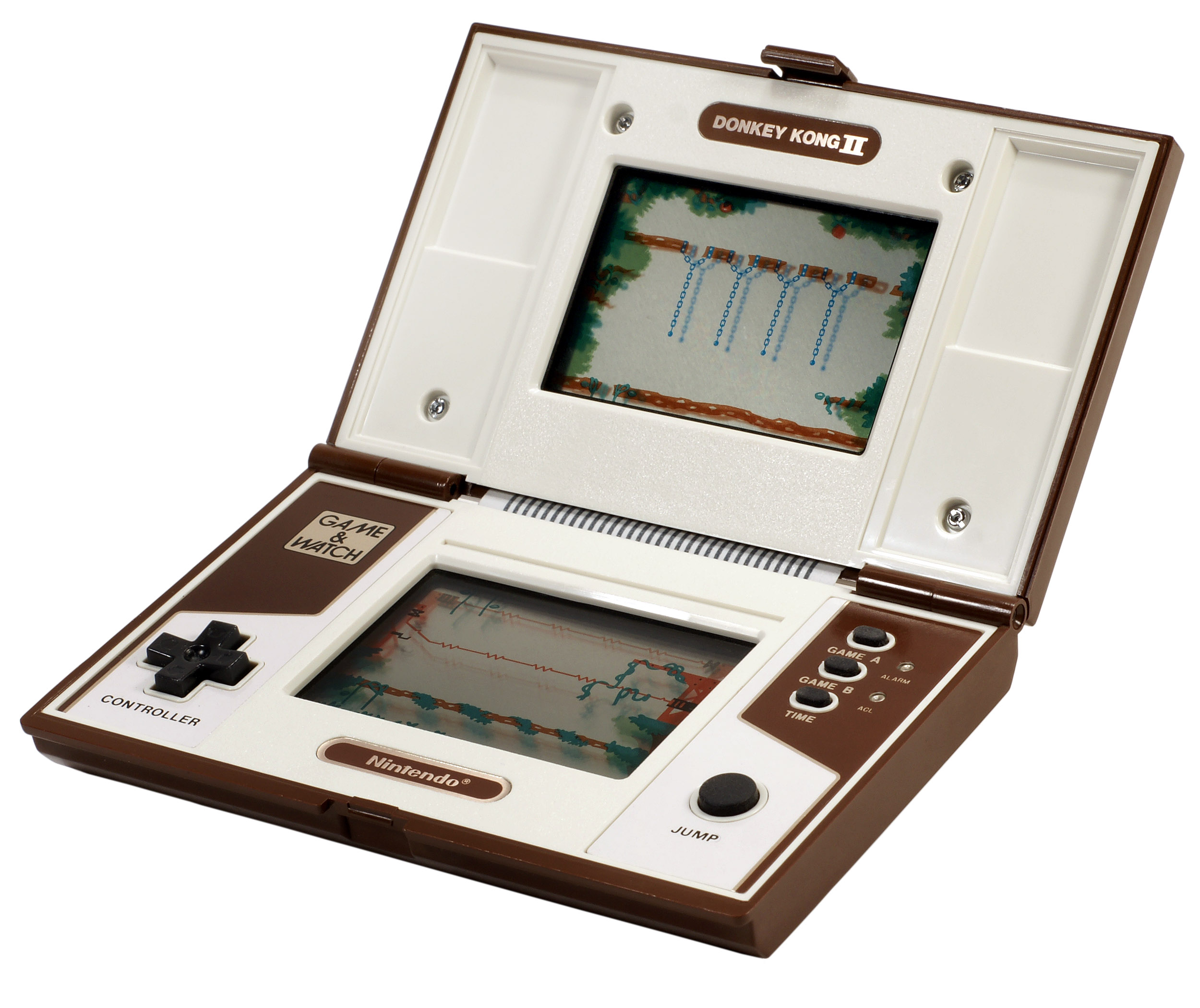
Donkey Kong II

Donkey Kong II, which is similar to Donkey Kong Jr., was developed by Nintendo R&D1 and released as part of the Game & Watch Vertical Multi Screen series, featuring two LCD screens. It was released in 1983. Donkey Kong Jr. must touch a key, which makes it move up to the top screen. He must then climb to the top screen while avoiding things such as electrical wires, crocodiles & birds. When he gets to the top screen, he must touch the key again, which makes it move right next to a keyhole below one of the chains. He must then climb up the rope below the keyhole, while avoiding birds. When he gets to the top of the rope, one of the chains will unlock. He must do this 4 times until he saves Donkey Kong. After that, the game will start over, at a somewhat faster pace. The game was later included in Game & Watch Gallery 3 (1999).

=== Donkey Kong Circus ===
Donkey Kong Circus is a Game & Watch Panorama series game released in 1984 as an edit to an earlier Mickey Mouse game. In this game, the player controls Donkey Kong, who is placed on a barrel while juggling pineapples and avoiding flames. This game is similar to Mario the Juggler, the last Game & Watch game, as they both involve a character juggling while avoiding objects.

=== Donkey Kong Hockey ===
Donkey Kong Hockey was developed by Nintendo R&D1 and released in 1984 as part of the Game & Watch Micro Vs. series. The game features one LCD screen and two attached control pads. The hockey features Donkey Kong as one of the players and Mario as the other.

=== Mario Bros. ===
Mario Bros., also known as Game & Watch Multi Screen: Mario Bros., is an action Game & Watch video game. The Game & Watch console was released as a handheld game console on March 14, 1983. The game features Mario and Luigi, working in a bottling plant, moving bottle crates between conveyor belts to a delivery truck. The game was the first appearance of Luigi, predating the arcade game of the same name. The game has been ported to the video game compilations Game & Watch Gallery 3 and 4, and has had an unofficial sequel known as Mario Bros. II in 1987.

=== Mario the Juggler ===
Mario the Juggler is a Game & Watch New Wide Screen series game featuring Mario as the juggler in the very first Game & Watch game, Ball. Released by Nintendo in October 1991, it was the final game to be released in the Game & Watch series.

=== Mario's Bombs Away ===
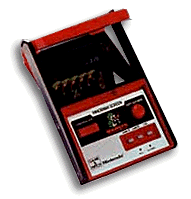
Mario's Bombs Away

Mario's Bombs Away is a Game & Watch Panorama series game released in 1983.

The game consists of a military-clad Mario delivering bombs from left to right, while keeping them away from flaming oil spills and enemy torches. It features a colour LCD screen without an internal back-light, which faces downward in order to expose the translucent rear to an external light source, e.g. daylight. The player views the action in a mirror that reflects the screen.

The game was later included in Game & Watch Gallery 4 (2002).

=== Mario's Cement Factory ===
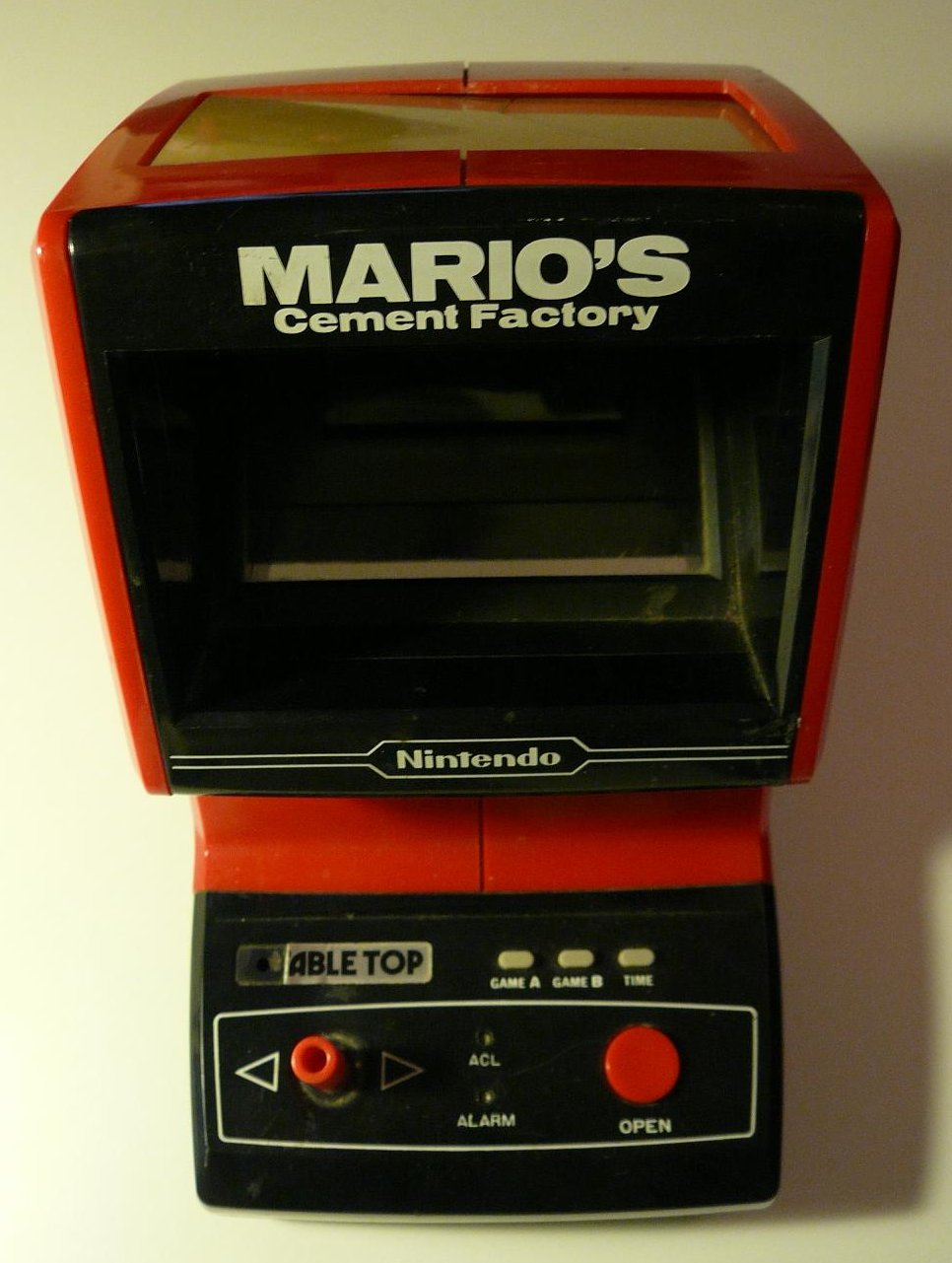
Mario's Cement Factory Tabletop

Mario's Cement Factory was a game developed by Nintendo R&D1 and first released in 1983 for the Game & Watch Tabletop series. The game was soon after released as part of the Game & Watch New Wide Screen series, and also as part of the Mini-Classics series in 1998 (a set of four Game & Watch games ported to small keychain-bound handhelds). It was also remade as part of Game Boy Gallery and Game & Watch Gallery 4, and has a DSiWare release.

In this game, the player assumes the role of Mario, working in a cement factory. The player must empty cement from the hoppers into the cement trucks below. A conveyor belt at the top moves cement into hoppers which can only hold three loads at a time. An alarm sounds when one has been filled to capacity. To move Mario around the screen, the player must use elevators located at the center. If the player moves to the center when an elevator is not present, Mario falls to the bottom and loses a life. Losing a life may also occur if the player stays on the elevator too long, in which case Mario will either fall or be crushed.

There are safe zones at the top and bottom of the elevators allowing Mario to hang without danger of being hurt.

The game includes two game modes, Game A and Game B. By selecting Game B, the player begins at a higher difficulty level than Game mode A. It was also the 7th Mario game.

=== Super Mario Bros. ===
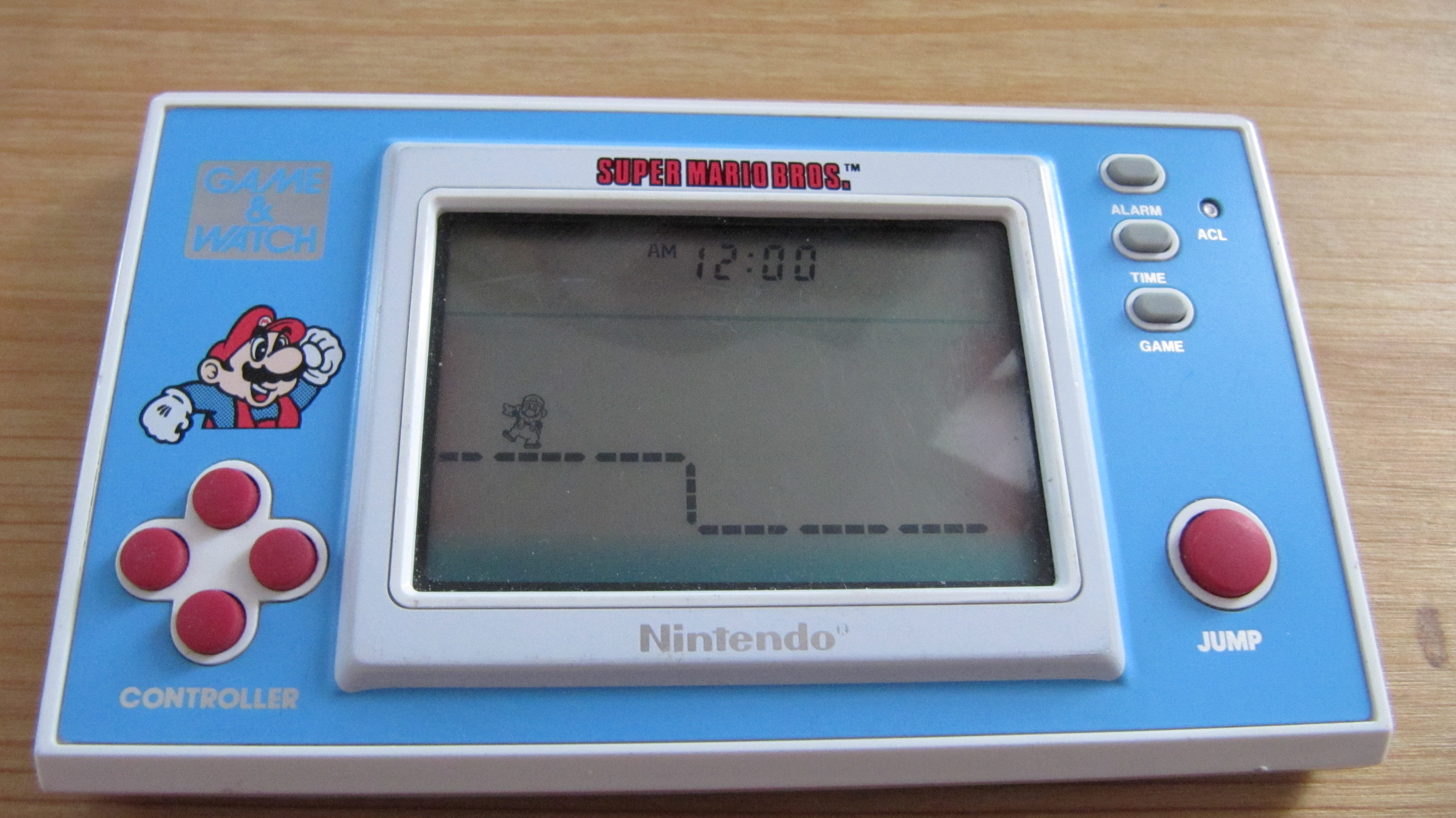
Super Mario Bros., New Wide Screen series variant

Super Mario Bros. was released in two different versions: YM-801 (Crystal Screen series, released June 1986) and YM-105 (New Wide Screen series, released March 1988). Later the same game was repackaged into a yellow special edition Diskun character case (YM-901-S), a character used to advertise the Famicom Disk System. This version was limited to 10,000 units, never sold in stores, and given away to winners of the Famicoms F-1 Grand Prix tournament.

The game plays like a scaled down version of the original NES game and features eight levels, which Mario must pass in order to rescue the princess. The game also features 1 Up Mushrooms, Stars, and the enemies Bullet Bill and Lakitu.

Each of the eight worlds feature Mario navigating a scrolling platformer. Mario must avoid getting trapped behind walls as the screen scrolls and navigate successful jumps which can lead to falling into the water below. The level progresses until Mario has moved all of the allotted "distance" points. Distance points are removed for each successful forward movement and added on for each successful backwards movement. Upon beating the eighth level, Mario receives a kiss from the princess, Bowser is thrown out of the castle, and then the game loops with longer distances.

Within the levels, 1-Up Mushrooms and Stars—staples of the Mario series—can be found by hitting the floor above Mario. When the mushroom is collected they will add a life (unless Mario has the maximum three reserved lives, in which case only points will be added); when the Star is collected Mario will be invincible for 10 seconds.

== Game watches ==

From the early mid-1980s to the late mid-1990s, Nelsonic Industries produced a line of multi-purpose wristwatches called Game Watches. These electronic devices employed an LCD to either tell the time or to allow players to play a game. In 1989, Nelsonic obtained licensing from Nintendo to produce a series of Game Watches based on popular Nintendo franchises such as Mario/Donkey Kong, The Legend of Zelda, and Star Fox. These games would enjoy limited inherited popularity based on the popularities of the original series, and they would periodically be re-released in a variety of colors. Originally retailing at moderate prices, these games have now become collector's items on the secondary market and fetch large prices at places like eBay.

The earliest of the Nintendo-licensed watches was Super Mario Bros., which was released in June 1989. The Super Mario Bros. 2 Game Watch was released shortly after. Subsequent to this Nelsonic released Game Watch versions of Super Mario Bros. 3 (1990), Super Mario Bros. 4 (1991, based on Super Mario World), and Super Mario Race (1992). Additionally, Donkey Kong (1994) was released as a wristwatch, featuring Mario.

Critics were generally pleased with the game watches and praised their stylishness as articles of clothing. Gameplay was roundly criticized as oversimplified, however, and the watches were considered to have been largely unsuccessful in evoking their original NES title namesakes. Super Mario Brothers 3 was described as "nothing like the NES game" and its single-screen layout resulted in play dynamics that were described as "boring".

List of games in the Mario series for the Nelsonic Game Watch line
Title	Date of release	Based on
Super Mario Bros.	June 1989	Super Mario Bros.
Super Mario Bros. 2	1989	Super Mario Bros. 2
Super Mario Bros. 3	1990; 1992 (UK)	Super Mario Bros. 3
Super Mario Bros. 4	1991	Super Mario World
Super Mario Race	1992	Super Mario Kart
Donkey Kong	1994	Donkey Kong

== Barcode Battler II game ==
In 1992, Epoch Co. was licensed to print a series of Nintendo-themed cards for their Barcode Battler II platform. Card sets were printed with both Mario and Zelda themes. Functioning similarly to an LCD e-Reader, the Barcode Battler II required players to swipe barcodes printed on cards across a visual input in order to enter characters, enemies, items, and spells into the console. The Super Mario World: Super Mario Bros. 4 set features 30 software-only cards and is based on the SNES's original Super Mario World.
