= Kanji Sonomama Rakubiki Jiten DS =

- Developers: Nintendo SPD; Intelligent Systems
- Publisher: Nintendo
- Director: Toshiaki Suzuki
- Producer: Shinya Takahashi
- Engine: PictoChat
- Platform: Nintendo DS
- Release: JP: April 13, 2006
- Genre: Educational
- Modes: Single-player, multiplayer

Kanji Sonomama Rakubiki Jiten DS (漢字そのままＤＳ楽引辞典; lit. "Kanji DS Advanced Dictionary"), is a Kanji-English-Japanese dictionary based training software developed for the Nintendo DS and released on April 13, 2006. The software was developed by Nintendo's Software Development and Design division with assistance from Intelligent Systems. It was released only in Japan. The software is marketed as a part of the Genius (ジーニアス, Jīniasu) series.

== Features ==
The software allows for the input of kanji symbols via the stylus, and for the lookup of words in English, as well as the two Japanese alphabets (hiragana and katakana), and also provides pronunciation. It also provides a quiz mode for added educational value. The software is intended to help Japanese people learning English with the TOEIC, or Test of English for International Communication. The software's official web site claims the dictionary offers 13,000 words.

The program also offers convenient features (べんり機能, benri kinō) including a calculator, world clock, alarm clock, and calendar.

The software also includes Pictochat with Japanese features and voices.

Additionally, the software has numerous Nintendo-related Easter eggs, such as the words "Mario" and "Nintendo" generating a Super Mario Bros. coin-collection sound when tapped on, and four hidden Game & Watch titles which can be played with the stylus or buttons: Ball, Manhole, Judge, and Flagman.
