= Game & Watch Gallery =

1997 video game

- North American box art
- Developers: Nintendo R&D1; Tose
- Publisher: Nintendo
- Director: Hitoshi Yamagami
- Producer: Takehiro Izushi
- Programmers: Sakae Takase; Toshifumi Hiroo; Takeshi Yamazaki
- Artists: Isao Shiroyama; Eiji Tachibana
- Composers: Yoko Mizuta; Jin Sugita
- Series: Game & Watch Gallery
- Platform: Game Boy
- Release: JP: February 1, 1997; NA: May 1997; EU: August 28, 1997
- Genre: Action
- Mode: Single-player

Game & Watch Gallery (Note: Known as Game Boy Gallery (Japanese: ゲームボーイギャラリー, Hepburn: Gēmu Bōi Gyararii) in Japan and Game Boy Gallery 2 in Australia) is a 1997 video game compilation developed by Tose and published by Nintendo for the Game Boy. It is the second entry in the Game & Watch Gallery series, following Game Boy Gallery. The compilation includes updated versions of four titles from Nintendo's Game & Watch line of handheld electronic games, originally released between 1980 and 1982. Each game is presented in two forms: a "Classic" mode that replicates the original gameplay and visuals, and a "Modern" mode with updated gameplay, enhanced graphics and music, and characters from the Mario franchise.

== Gameplay ==
Game & Watch Gallery features four games based upon the Game & Watch brand of handheld games. Each game contains a 'Classic' mode, resembling the gameplay and presentation of the original Game & Watch title, and a 'Modern' mode, which contains additional gameplay mechanics and revised graphics based on the Mario franchise. Normal and Hard difficulty settings can be selected for each mode. The following four Game & Watch games are included:

- Fire: Players must use a tarp to catch people jumping from a burning building and bounce them to safety. In the 'Modern' version, different characters have different bounce durations.
- Manhole: Players must place a manhole in gaps in the street to allow pedestrians to safely cross without falling. In the 'Modern' version, different characters move at different speeds, and Yoshi can prepare a manhole in advance, which will only drop after being stepped on.
- Octopus: Players must retrieve treasure from a sunken chest while avoiding an octopus' moving tentacles. In the 'Modern' version, Mario's speed is affected by the amount of treasure he is carrying.
- Oil Panic: Players must catch falling oil droplets and dispose of them without hitting bystanders or letting their bucket overflow. In the 'Modern' version, Mario carries two buckets at once and can rotate their position.

For every 200 points players accrue in each game, they earn 'stars' which can be used to unlock entries in an in-game gallery displaying animations of other Game & Watch titles; up to five stars can be earned in each mode and difficulty of each game, for a total of 80 stars. When played on a Super Game Boy or Game Boy Color, the games receive a limited color upgrade.

== Development ==
Game & Watch Gallery was designed by Tose and Nintendo R&D1 and published by Nintendo. It was released for the Game Boy in 1997 for Japan on February 1, for the United States on May 5, for Europe on August 28, and for Australia the same year. It was released for the Nintendo Power for the Game Boy in Japan on March 1, 2000. It was released on the Nintendo 3DS Virtual Console in 2011 for Japan on June 22, for North America on July 14, and for Europe and Australia on July 21; while it was originally released under the title Game Boy Gallery 2 in Australia, the Virtual Console release uses the title Game & Watch Gallery.

== Reception ==
Reception

Aggregate score
Aggregator	Score
GameRankings	76.65%

Review scores
Publication	Score
AllGame	9/10
Eurogamer	5/10
Famitsu	4/10, 5/10, 7/10, 6/10
GamesRadar+	3.5/5
IGN	8/10

Game & Watch Gallery received generally positive reviews. It holds an average score of 76.65% on GameRankings, based on four reviews.

Steve Averett of IGN compared the game favorably to Tetris and Dr. Mario, calling it a strong "twitch" title and a worthwhile choice for fans of the Game & Watch series. The game was also selected by IGN readers as the "best Game Boy action game" of the century. Joe Ottoson of Allgame echoed Averett, stating that "every game on the cart is a simple yet dangerously addictive dose of pure unfettered and unvarnished fun."

Nathan Meunier of GamesRadar+ praised the updated versions of the games and found the compilation addictive, though he considered the original versions less engaging and wished the cartridge had included more titles.

Jeremy Parish of USgamer and Thomas East of the Official Nintendo Magazine UK both named the game among the best of the Nintendo 3DS's Virtual Console titles. East acknowledged the simplicity of the games but described them as "addictive nonetheless". Clark Anderson of Digitally Downloaded called the Virtual Console re-release a good value, describing several of the games—especially Fire—as addictive. Andrew Brown of Nintendo World Report found that the game offered broad appeal, citing the inclusion of both original and updated versions of each game.

Some criticism was directed at the game's limited depth. Kristan Reed of Eurogamer argued that players without nostalgia for the original Game & Watch titles might find the compilation "little more than a curiosity". Tyler Treese of Game Revolution expressed interest in seeing Game & Watch Gallery and its sequels remade for the Nintendo Switch. In his book Best Before: Videogames, Supersession and Obsolescence, author James Newman cited the game as an early example of the remastering trend that became prominent during the PlayStation 3 and Xbox 360 era, highlighting its enhanced visuals while retaining original gameplay mechanics.
