= Game & Watch Gallery 2 =

1997 video game

- North American Game Boy Color box art
- Developers: Nintendo R&D1; Tose
- Publisher: Nintendo
- Director: Hitoshi Yamagami
- Producer: Takehiro Izushi
- Programmers: Sakae Takase; Toshifumi Hiroo; Toru Fushimi; Taro Nagaoka
- Artist: Isao Shiroyama
- Composers: Noriko Nishizaka; Saburo Sasaki; Yoko Mizuta
- Series: Game & Watch Gallery
- Platforms: Game Boy, Game Boy Color
- Release: Game Boy: JP: September 27, 1997; Game Boy Color: NA: November 18, 1998; EU: November 23, 1998
- Genre: Action
- Mode: Single-player

Game & Watch Gallery 2, known in Japan as Game Boy Gallery 2, (Note: Japanese: ゲームボーイギャラリー２, Hepburn: Gēmu Bōi Gyararii 2) is a video game compilation developed by Tose and published by Nintendo. It was released for the Game Boy in Japan in 1997, and for the Game Boy Color in North America and Europe in November 1998. It is the third entry in the Game & Watch Gallery series, and includes updated versions of six titles from Nintendo's Game & Watch line of handheld electronic games, originally released between 1980 and 1982.. Each game is presented in two forms: a "Classic" mode that replicates the original gameplay and visuals, and a "Modern" mode with updated gameplay, enhanced graphics and music, and characters from the Mario franchise.

== Gameplay ==
A screenshot of the 'Modern' mode of Helmet on the Game Boy Color version

Game & Watch Gallery 2 features six games based upon the Game & Watch brand of handheld games, five of which are initially available. Each game contains a 'Classic' mode, resembling the gameplay and presentation of the original Game & Watch title, and a 'Modern' mode, which contains additional gameplay mechanics and revised graphics based on the Mario franchise. Normal and Hard difficulty settings can be selected for each mode.

- Ball: The player juggles two to three balls in the air, requiring the player to catch and toss them up again, with one point earned for each successful catch. In the 'Modern' version, Bob-Ombs will also sometimes appear, which the player must avoid catching.
- Chef: The player moves left and right to catch food in their frying pan to toss up into the air. In the 'Modern' version, the player controls Princess Peach and can rotate and turn on the spot to feed Yoshi.
- Donkey Kong: As Mario, the player moves left and right and jumps to avoid barrels, making their way up platforms and ladders towards Donkey Kong. In the 'Modern' version, platforms disappear and levels change for greater variation.
- Helmet: The player moves left and right to avoid tools falling from the sky, making their way between two doors, with a point awarded for every journey. In the 'Modern' version, Mario avoids hammers being thrown by a Paratroopa, and can earn coins by pressing a P Switch that sometimes appears on screen.
- Parachute: The player controls a boat, and must collect parachutists before they fall into shark-infested waters, in which case a life is lost. In the 'Modern' version, parachutists sometimes land in a cannon to be shot back into the sky.
- Vermin: The player moves left and right to hit moles with a hammer as they appear out of ground. In the 'Modern' version, the player controls Yoshi, who can also move up and down, and must guard eggs from enemies that come from all sides.

For every 200 points players accrue in each game, they earn 'stars' which can be used to unlock additional features, including the game Ball, a sound test, additional playable characters in Ball, and entries in an in-game museum displaying animations of other Game & Watch titles; up to five stars can be earned in each mode and difficulty of each game, for a total of 120 stars.

== Reception ==
Reception

Review scores
Publication	Score
AllGame	3.5/5
Electronic Gaming Monthly	8/10, 5/10, 6.5/10, 5.5/10
IGN	8/10
Game Boy Xtreme	88%
Planet Game Boy	3/5
Nintendojo	9.0
Total Game Boy	92%

Game & Watch Gallery 2 received generally positive reviews, particularly for its presentation and replay value.

Dexter Sy of IGN praised the Game Boy Color version for its "amazing color graphics, smooth animation and characters", describing the "uncomplicated" nature of the Game & Watch titles as a "breath of fresh air". He also highlighted the "significant twists" introduced by the game's updated features. Total Game Boy similarly recommended the title, calling it an "essential purchase" for Game Boy Color owners. The magazine described it as "perfect for those 'quick fix' gaming sessions", noting that the inclusion of five different games provided "plenty of variety". Ty Kris of Nintendojo also reviewed the game favorably, stating that it "more than does the original Game & Watch games justice" and praised its "ton of replay value". He found most of the included games "enjoyable and rewarding".

In contrast, Adam Waring of Planet Game Boy offered a more mixed evaluation. While he acknowledged the game's "slick and snazzy" graphics, he felt that even the modern versions of the games remained "very basic" and "get tiresome quickly", ultimately describing the collection as "too simplistic and samey to keep your attention for long".
