= Game & Watch =

Series of handheld electronic games by Nintendo

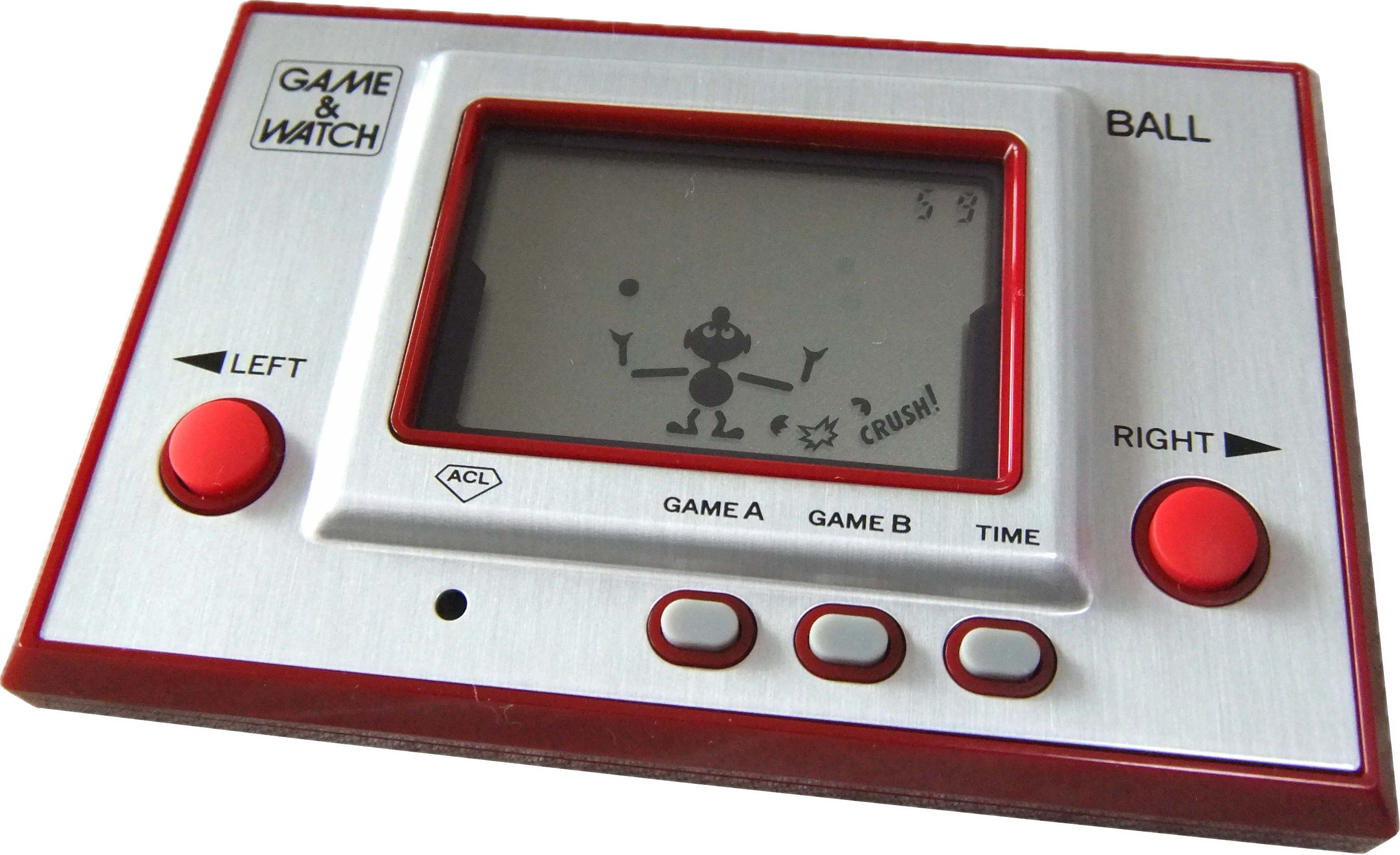
- Ball, the first Game & Watch device
- Also known as: Tricotronic (West Germany, Austria); Time-Out (North America)
- Developer: Nintendo R&D1
- Manufacturer: Nintendo
- Type: Handheld electronic games
- Generation: Second
- Released: 28 April 1980
- Introductory price: ¥5,800 (equivalent to ¥8,595 in 2024)
- Discontinued: 1991
- Units sold: 43.4 million
- CPU: Sharp SM5xx MCU family
- Memory: 80–128 nibble RAM
- Storage: 1,792–4,032 byte ROM + 0/256 6-bit Melody ROM
- Display: Segmented liquid-crystal display
- Best-selling game: Donkey Kong (8 million)
- Successor: Game Boy
- Made in: Japan

Game & Watch (Note: Japanese: ゲーム&ウオッチ, Hepburn: Gēmu & Uotchi) is a series of handheld electronic games developed by Nintendo. Designed by Gunpei Yokoi, the first game, Ball was released in 1980 and the original production run of the devices continued until 1991. The name Game & Watch reflects their dual functionality: a single game paired with a digital clock on a segmented liquid-crystal display (LCD) screen. The Game & Watch series proved a monumental success, selling a total of 43.4 million units globally, marking Nintendo's first major worldwide success with electronic games.

== History ==
The Game & Watch was the brainchild of designer Gunpei Yokoi, the head of Nintendo Research & Development 1 (R&D1), who was inspired during a trip on a Shinkansen high-speed train, where he noticed a bored businessman idly pressing buttons on a credit-card-sized pocket calculator. This sparked the idea of a compact, discreet toy for adults to pass the time on public transport. At the time, Nintendo was struggling financially, and R&D1 consisted of just Yokoi and his assistant, Satoru Okada. The two looked at other handheld electronic games, including Mattel Auto Race, the Microvision, and Simon, but found these too large and reliant on low-resolution vacuum fluorescent or LED displays that rendered abstract graphics. This led to the idea of using a segmented liquid-crystal display (LCD), like those in calculators, to create a smaller device with sharper, clearer graphics, though limited to a single game.

This experience would inspire Yokoi's design philosophy of "lateral thinking with withered technology", (Note: Japanese: 枯れた技術の水平思考, Hepburn: Kareta Gijutsu no Suihei Shikō) which emphasized creative uses of mature, cost-effective technology. This principle would continue to be embraced by Nintendo in the following decades. At the time, fierce competition in the calculator market between Sharp and Casio had created a surplus of LCDs and semiconductors, creating an opportunity to repurpose these components for gaming.

Yokoi pitched the idea to Nintendo president Hiroshi Yamauchi while driving him to a business meeting after the company chauffeur called in sick. Yamauchi's meeting happened to be with Sharp's CEO, and the two leaders discussed the concept. Within a week, Yokoi was invited to a meeting between Nintendo and Sharp, where approval was given to develop a calculator-sized gaming device.

Yamauchi, however, assigned the project to Nintendo Research & Development 2 (R&D2), which was established in 1978 to focus on electronic projects like the Color TV-Game, while R&D1 was to continue to focus on creating physical toys and games. R&D2 rejected the idea, claiming it was too difficult to implement. Undeterred, Yokoi and Okada continued developing the concept on their own. Yokoi created a mock-up of the first game, Ball, and demonstrated it to Okada by shining light through cut-out paper shapes. Okada then built a working prototype, buying a TK-80 computer, teaching himself to program for the Intel 8080, and designing the necessary electronics.

When they presented the prototype to employees at Sharp, they also dismissed the project, saying it wasn't feasible to scale it down to calculator size. Yokoi and Okada left the prototype with Sharp, asking them to play with it for a while, which convinced Sharp employees of the game's potential and led them to develop a compatible display. The final device was powered by a 4-bit microcontroller from Sharp's SM5xx family containing an LCD screen driver and an integrated ROM and RAM. Their size differed with chip model, for example:

Some microcontrollers of SM5xx family used
Chip model	Read-only memory (ROM)	Melody ROM	General-purpose RAM	LCD RAM
SM5A	1,792 bytes	—N/a	32 bytes	8 bytes
SM510	2,772 bytes	—N/a	48 bytes	16 bytes
SM511	4,032 bytes	192 bytes	48 bytes	16 bytes
SM512	4,032 bytes	192 bytes	40 bytes	24 bytes

The SM5A and SM510–SM512 are rated for a cycle time 61 microseconds (μs) and externally connect to a standard 32.768 kHz crystal oscillator (commonly used in quartz clocks) and an internal clock generator with a 15-stage frequency divider. Note: a 61 μs cycle time corresponds to a clock rate of roughly 16.384 kHz (half of 32.768 kHz).

The Game & Watch name reflected its dual functionality: it combined a single game with a digital clock. The first game, Ball, had modest initial sales but enough success for Yamauchi to greenlight three more games: Flagman, Vermin, and Fire. This eventually led to dozens of titles over the next decade.

In North America, the games were initially launched through Mego Corporation as the Time-Out series. The series included Ball (renamed Toss-Up), Flagman, Vermin (renamed Exterminator), and Fire (retitled Fireman Fireman). This partnership ended within a year, and Nintendo of America began distributing the series under their original titles.

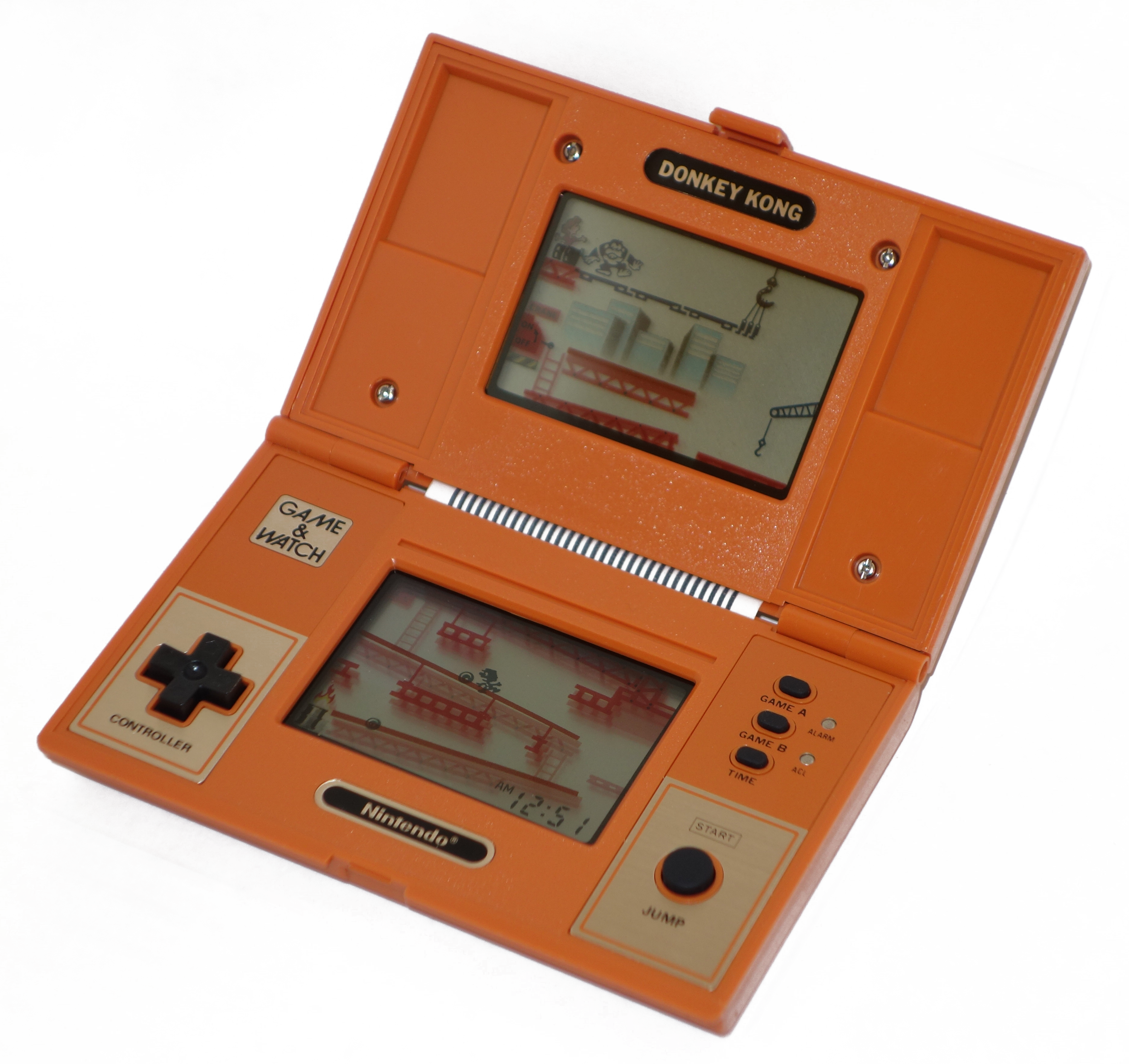
Donkey Kong, showing its revolutionary D-pad and multi-screen clamshell design

Starting in 1981, Game & Watch devices incorporated an alarm function, enhancing their practicality as a watch. By mid-1982, limitations of single-screen LCDs led to the creation of the Multi Screen Series, which effectively doubled the gameplay area. Oil Panic launched the series. Shortly thereafter, Nintendo's highly successful Donkey Kong arcade game was adapted for the Multi Screen format, requiring an alternative to the traditional joystick, which was impractical for handheld gaming. This challenge led to the invention of the now-iconic D-pad, a flat, four-way directional control that allowed for precise movement with minimal space requirements. The D-pad design was later honored with a Technology & Engineering Emmy Award in 2008. The clamshell design of the Multi Screen Series would later inspire the Game Boy Advance SP, Nintendo DS, and Nintendo 3DS.

The Game & Watch series was a monumental success. Yokoi had initially aimed to sell 100,000 units, but Nintendo ultimately sold 43.4 million units worldwide—12.87 million in Japan and 30.53 million overseas. The device also significantly improved Nintendo's financial standing. Before its release in 1980, the company reportedly had debts of 7 to 8 billion yen. By 1981, however, largely due to the Game & Watch's success, Nintendo had paid off its debts and put about 4 billion yen in the bank. It marked the company's first major worldwide success with a Nintendo video game product.

== Series ==
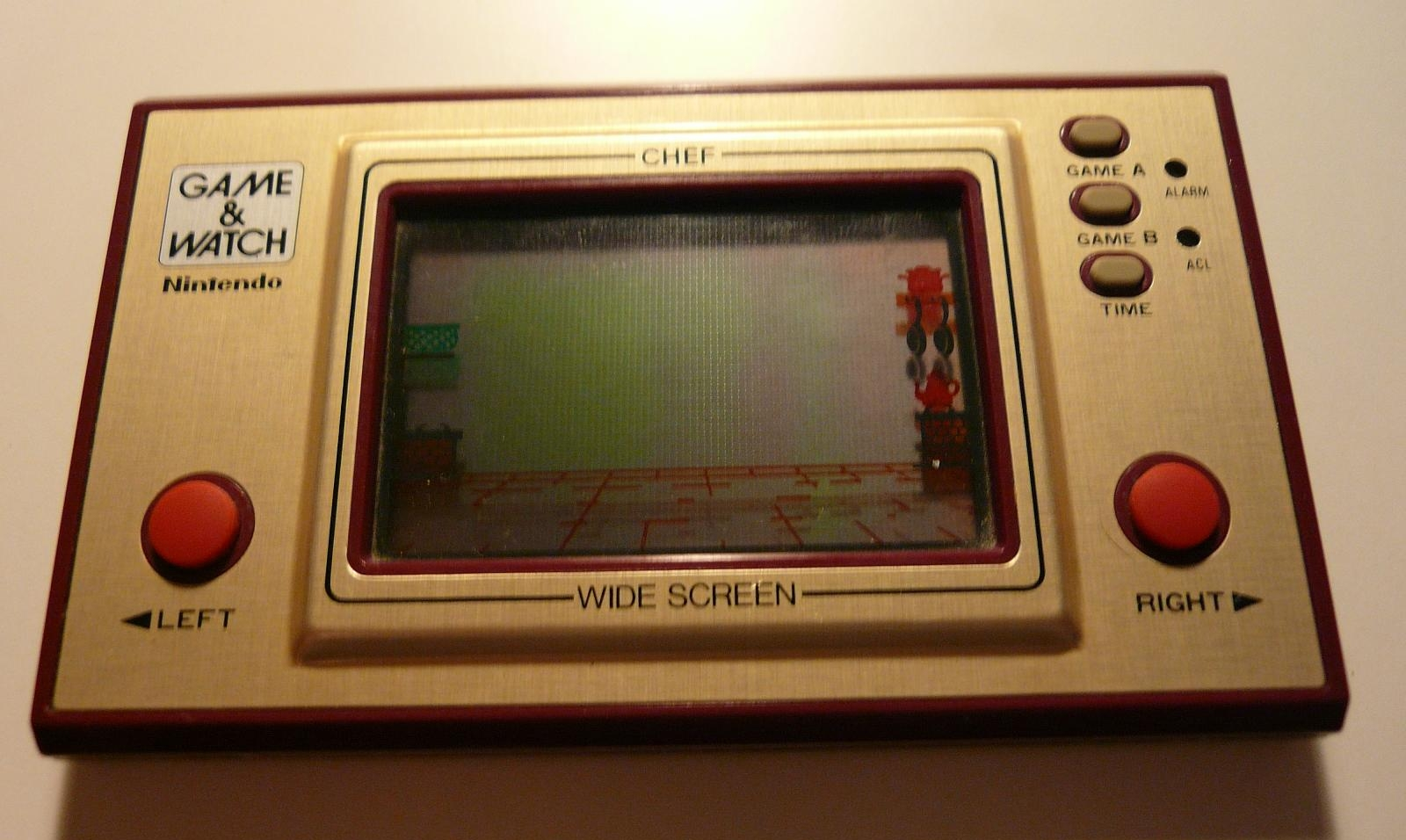
Chef, a Game & Watch Wide Screen series device

Over the initial eleven-year life span of the Game & Watch line, 60 different games were produced for sale. These games came in eleven different series, each with a different form-factor:

- Silver (1980) – the first version of the Game & Watch
- Gold (1981) – added alarm clock function, static color backgrounds, and a built-in wire loop stand
- Wide Screen (1981–1982) – introduced a 30% larger LCD panel in a slightly wider form factor
- Vertical Multi Screen (1982–1989) – two LCD panels in a vertical folding clamshell unit
- Horizontal Multi Screen (1983) – two LCD panels in a right-to-left opening clamshell unit
- New Wide Screen (1982–1991) – an updated version of the Wide Screen series; used colorful metal faceplates for each game
- Tabletop (1983) – made to compete with Coleco; these actually do not use VFD (Vacuum Fluorescent Display) screens but regular LCD screens like all other Game & Watch games. Ambient light transmitted through the translucent top illuminates an integrated mirror which bounces the light onto the back of the display. The polarizer film is flipped front to back, creating a full blackened LCD screen in power-off mode, when LCD segments are turned on these will become transparent holes, allowing light passing through them from the mirror on the back. The colors come from a colored overlay which make the holes appear colored.
- Panorama (1983–1984) - similar design to the Tabletop units, but folded into a compact size via an articulated hinge
- Super Color (1984) – used a long portrait-oriented LCD panel with color overlays to color the display elements
- Micro Vs. System (1984) – used a wide horizontal LCD panel; allowed 2-player games via two external wired control pads
- Crystal Screen (1986) – used a unique large see-through LCD panel with no reflective background; all three games were later re-released as New Wide Screen titles

Titles included characters from other Nintendo franchises, including The Legend of Zelda and Mario Bros. Nintendo also licensed third-party characters including Mickey Mouse.

Among the 60 games was one "prize" game, a version of Super Mario Bros. that came in a yellow plastic case modeled after the Disk-kun character Nintendo used to advertise their Famicom Disk System. These games were never sold, but instead given away to 10,000 winners of Nintendo's F-1 Grand Prix tournament.

The Game & Watch series sold 14 million units worldwide during its first year of release by 1981. The Game & Watch version of Donkey Kong released in 1982 sold 8 million units. Mario the Juggler was the last LCD installment in the Game & Watch series released in 1991 and is a tribute to the first game, Ball.

== Game A and Game B ==
Most of the titles have a "GAME A" and a "GAME B" button. Game B is generally a faster, more difficult version of Game A, although exceptions do exist:

- In Squish, Game B is radically different from Game A—the player must touch aliens to eliminate them as opposed to avoiding moving walls.
- In Flagman, Game B is a mode where the player has to press the right button within a certain amount of time, not memorize patterns.
- In Judge, Boxing, Donkey Kong 3, and Donkey Kong Hockey, Game B is a two-player version of Game A.
- In Climber, Balloon Fight, and Super Mario Bros., there is no Game B button.

In most cases, both Game A and Game B would increase in speed and/or difficulty as the player progressed, with Game B starting at the level that Game A would reach at 200 points.

== Legacy, ports and remakes ==
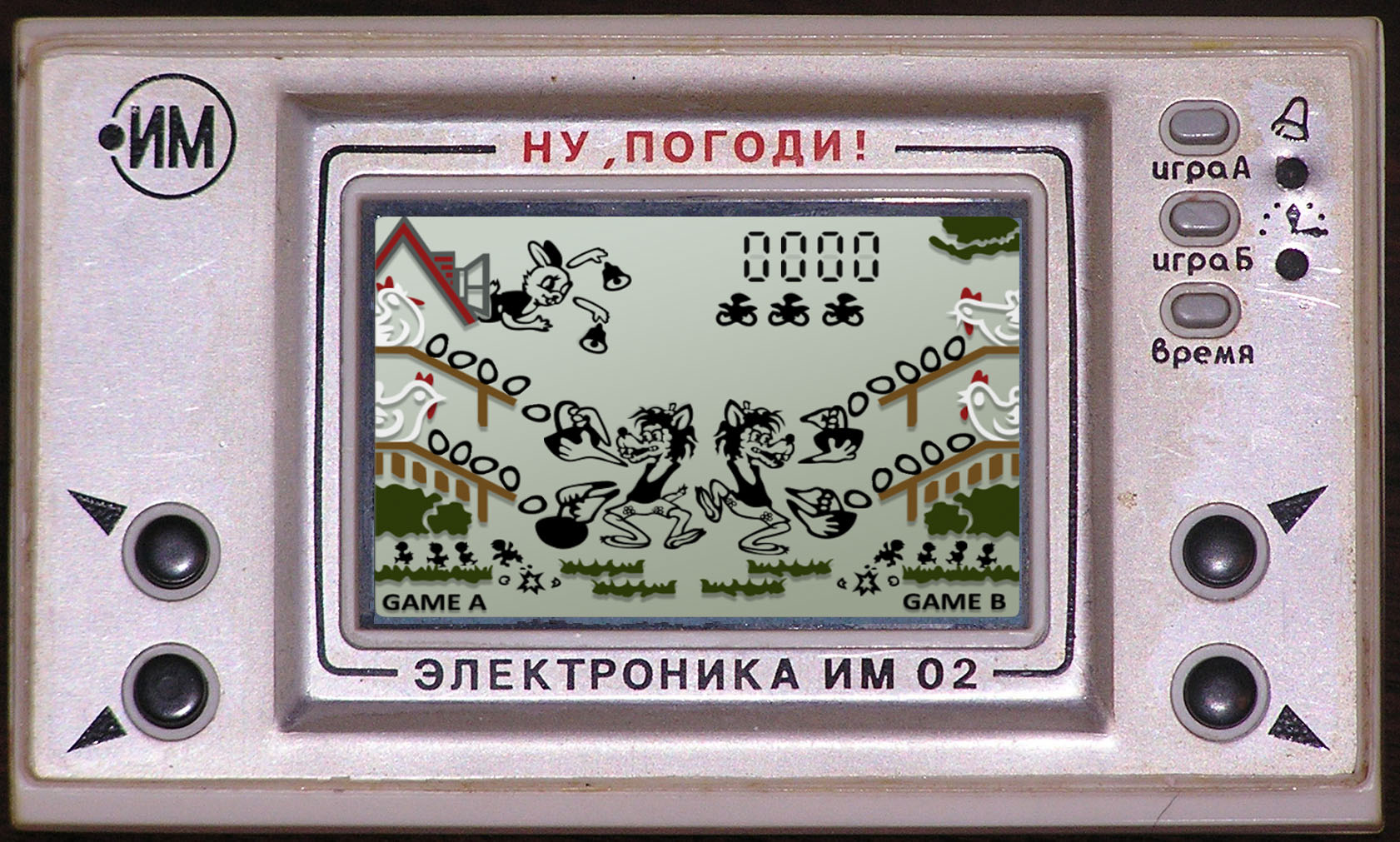
Elektronika IM-02 (Well, Just You Wait!), a clone of the Game & Watch game Egg from the Soviet Union

The Game & Watch series helped to popularize handheld video games, inspiring imitators like Tiger Electronics, Micro Games of America, Konami and Elektronika, which released the IM-02 series in the Soviet Union.

Fishing Computer Models of the Bassmate, Bassmate II and WalleyeMate

Nintendo also used the core technology from the Game & Watch line for the Bassmate Computer, a handheld databank intended for bass fishing. The Bassmate was released in 1984 by Telko under various brand names, with Nintendo acting as the original design manufacturer.

After this initial model, Telko and its partners expanded the concept into several related fishing computers—including the Bassmate II, WalleyeMate, and Troutmate—all of which were produced without Nintendo's involvement. These later units reused the same basic hardware and software platform created for the original Bassmate but were engineered and manufactured entirely by third‑party companies. Each model targeted a different fishing niche—bass, walleye, or trout—and, like the first Bassmate, was sold under multiple brand names such as Telko, KMV, and Probe 2000.

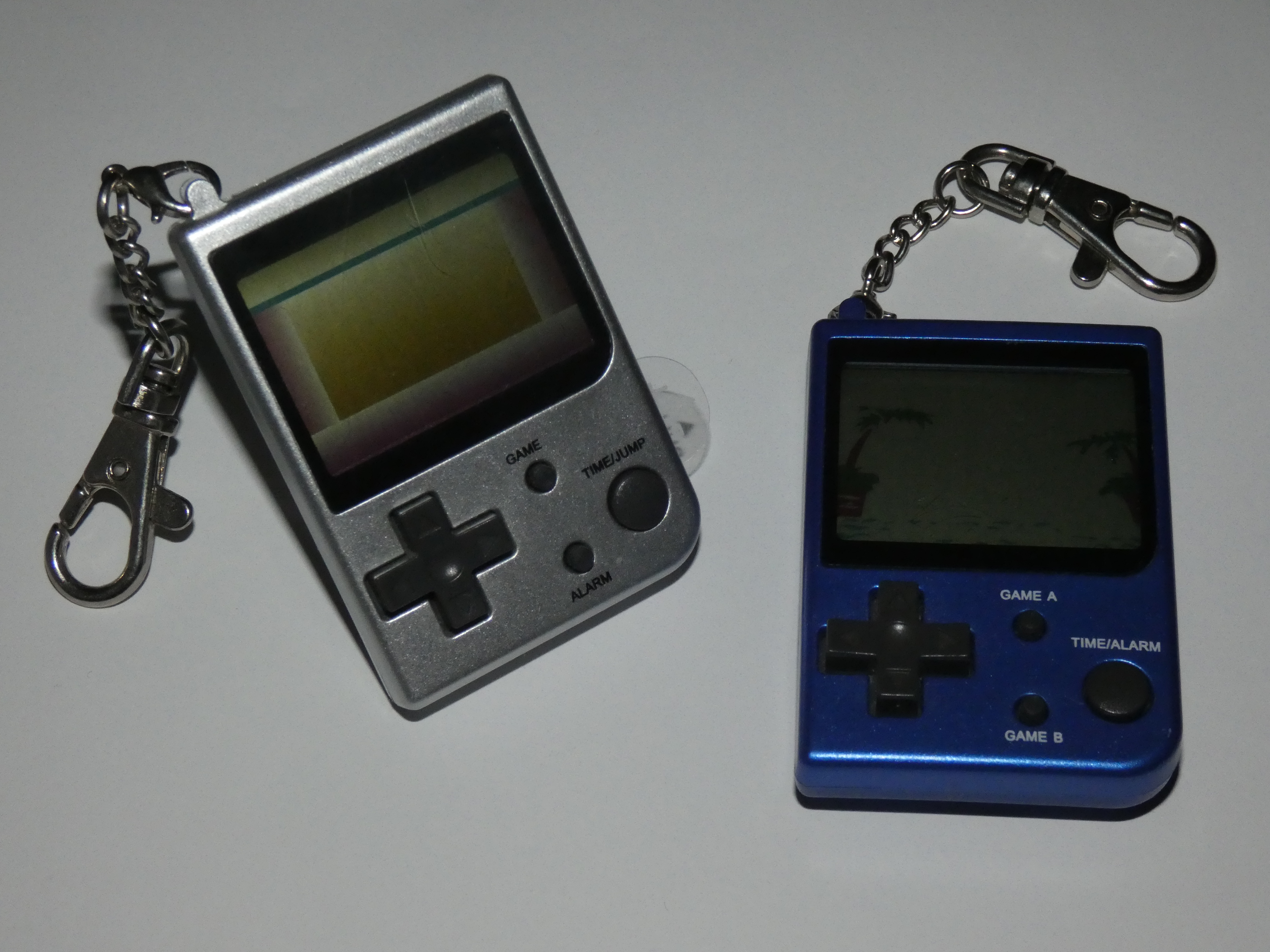
Nintendo Mini Classics

Nintendo revived the series between 1995 and 2002 with the Game & Watch Gallery series for Game Boy, Game Boy Color and Game Boy Advance featuring original ports and modernized Mario-themed versions. Starting in 1998, smaller LCD versions of ten Game & Watch titles were re-released as the Nintendo Mini Classics. In 2001, Nintendo bundled Manhole-e with the Nintendo e-Reader, though a planned line of e-Reader Game & Watch cards never materialized.

From 2006 to 2010, Nintendo produced the Game & Watch Collection series for the Nintendo DS, initially exclusive to Club Nintendo. Between 2009 and 2010, nine Game & Watch titles were released on DSiWare. In the DS game, Cooking Guide: Can't Decide What to Eat?, the player can unlock the game Chef.

To celebrate Game & Watch's 30th anniversary in 2010, Nintendo re-released Ball as a Club Nintendo reward, adding a mute switch. It was available to members in Japan, North America, and Europe. The Game & Watch legacy was also acknowledged in the 2012 game Nintendo Land for Wii U, with a mini-game called Octopus Dance based on the classic Octopus title.

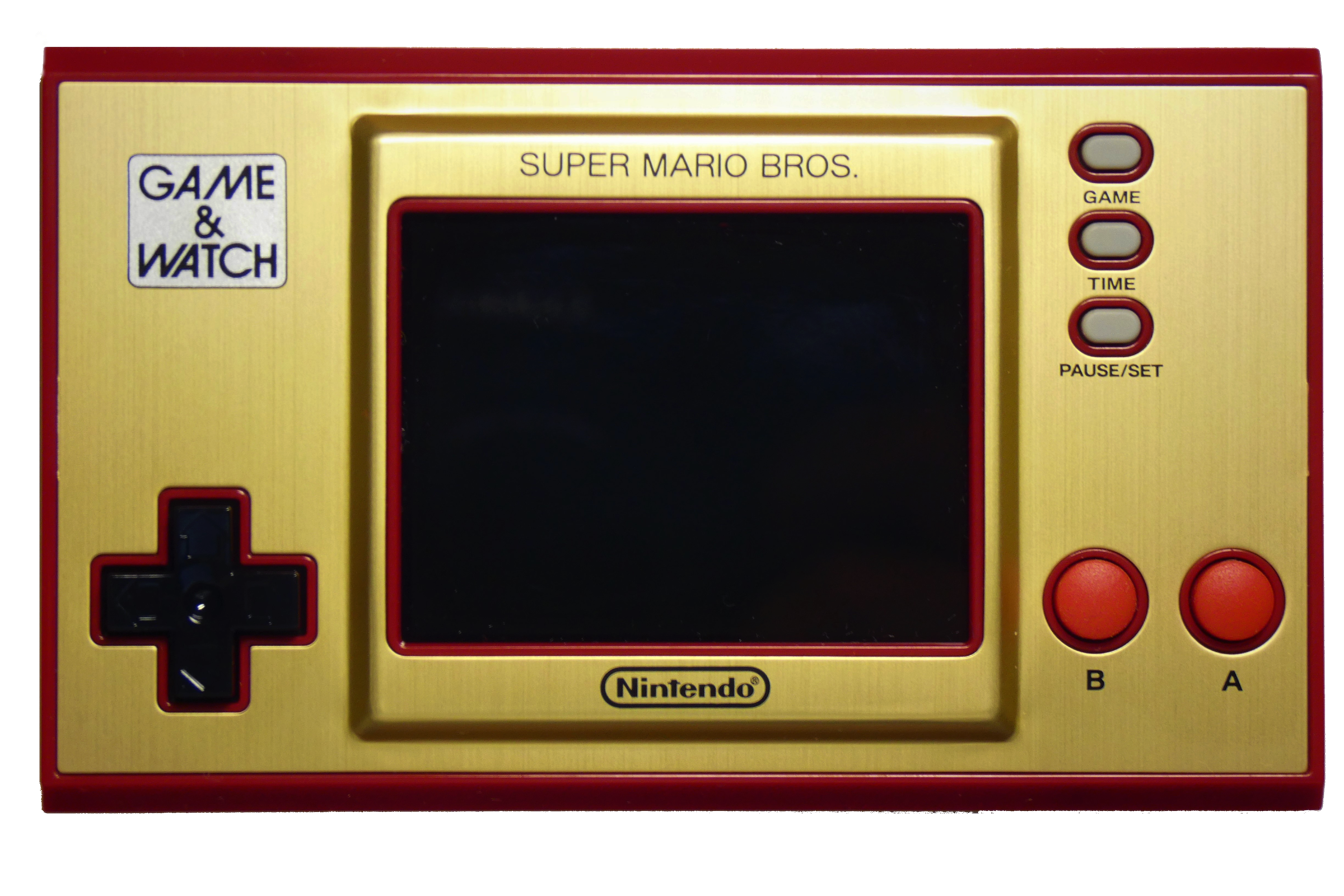
Game & Watch: Super Mario Bros.

In 2020, Nintendo released Game & Watch: Super Mario Bros. to commemorate the 35th anniversary of the Super Mario series and the 40th anniversary of the Game & Watch line. This limited-edition handheld included the full NES versions of Super Mario Bros. and Super Mario Bros.: The Lost Levels, and Ball now starring Mario. The following year, Nintendo launched Game & Watch: The Legend of Zelda to celebrate that franchise's 35th anniversary. It included The Legend of Zelda, Zelda II: The Adventure of Link, The Legend of Zelda: Link's Awakening, and Vermin now starring Link. Unlike the classic Game & Watch devices, these modern versions are far more technically advanced with a backlit full-color LCD screen, a rechargeable battery that charges via USB-C, and powered by a Cortex-M7 processor with over a megabyte of RAM and flash memory.

=== Television Commercial Restoration ===
In 2024, an original 16mm print of a commercial for the Mego version of Ball (renamed Toss-Up) was discovered by Nintendo historian Chris Kohler, who donated it to the Video Game History Foundation.

The print, which was produced by DuRona Productions in 1980, was digitized in 2K resolution and partially restored by archival group Movette Film Transfer, before receiving further restoration by filmmaker Garrett Gilchrist - known for his restorations of The Thief and the Cobbler and Super Mario Bros. (1993).

This commercial, along with a variant containing footage of other Game & Watch titles, had previously been available through low-quality off-air VHS recordings.

=== Mr. Game & Watch ===
Mr. Game & Watch represents the brand in Nintendo's Super Smash Bros. series, debuting in Melee (2001) as a two-dimensional and stick-figure-styled fighter with moves based on classic Game & Watch games. He also appears in Game & Watch Gallery 4 and makes cameos in Donkey Kong Country Returns and Rhythm Heaven Fever. In 2015, Nintendo released a Mr. Game & Watch Amiibo, which unlocks a personal CPU fighter in Super Smash Bros. and a cosmetic option in Super Mario Maker. His moveset in the Super Smash Bros. series utilizes techniques taken from various Game & Watch games. He was featured as one of the greatest video game icons by Retro Gamer staff, describing him as an early mascot in gaming while additionally someone who never earned the level of celebrity that Nintendo's biggest characters did. They felt that his simple design made him work well on the LCD format, and allowed him to slot into different roles. The character makes a cameo appearance in The Super Mario Galaxy Movie (2026), where Luigi paints him into existence after taking Bowser Jr.'s paintbrush.

== See also ==
- History of Nintendo
