= Mario (disambiguation) =

Mario is a video game character created by Nintendo.

Mario may also refer to:

== Film and television ==
- Mario (1984 film), a Canadian drama film
- Mario (2018 film), a Swiss film
- Mario (2025 film), an Indian film
- List of non-video game media featuring Mario
  - Mario: Game Over, an American comedy web video
- Mario (TV series), a 2013 television sitcom series

== Games ==
- Mario (franchise), a multimedia franchise starring Mario
  - List of video games featuring Mario

== Music ==
- Mario (tenor), Italian opera singer
- Mario (American singer), American R&B singer
- Mario (album), a 2002 album by Mario
- "Mario" (song), a 1985 song by Franco Luambo and the TPOK Jazz
- "Mario (Your Own Way to Paradise)", a 1983 song by Bow Wow Wow from When the Going Gets Tough, The Tough Get Going

== People ==
- Mario (name), a given name and surname (includes a list of people and fictional characters with the name)

== Places ==
- Monte Mario, a hill in Rome, Italy
- Mario's, a restaurant in New York
- Mario's Hotel, or just Mario's, former name of the Palace Hotel, Broken Hill, Australia

== Other uses ==
- Mario, codename for one of the builds on ChromeOS
- 12931 Mario, an asteroid
- Mario (goose), a goose which died at Los Angeles Zoo in 2018
- List of storms named Mario, a list of storms with the name

== See also ==
- Mario II (disambiguation)
- Mario Bros. (disambiguation)
- Super Mario (disambiguation)
- Super Mario Bros. (disambiguation)
- Super Mario Bros. 2 (disambiguation)
- Super Mario World (disambiguation)
- Mario 3D (disambiguation)
- Dr. Mario (disambiguation)
- Mario + Rabbids (disambiguation)
- Marioo, Swahili-language singers of Tanzania
- Mari0, a 2012 indie game
- Mar10, March 10th National Holiday
