= Mario II =

Mario II, Mario 2, may refer to:

- SS Mario II (name used 1947–1948), a WWII liberty ship launched in 1943, former name of the cargo ship SS A. B. Hammond
- Mario II Sforza (1631–1658), House of Sforza, ruling sovereign Count of the County of Santa Fiora
- Mario Bros. II, a 1987 videogame by Thundersoft for the Commodore 64
- Super Mario Bros. 2 (disambiguation), several videogames known in short form as "Mario 2"
- Mario 2, TPOK Jazz Mario (song) recording

== See also ==
- Paper Mario 2, a 2004 videogame from Nintendo
- Mario (disambiguation)
