= Super Mario (disambiguation) =

Super Mario is a video game series by Nintendo.

Super Mario may also refer to:

== Video games ==
- Super Mario Bros., the first game of the video game series released in 1985 for the NES
- Mario (franchise), the franchise to which the Super Mario series belongs
- Mario, the star character of Nintendo's Mario series

== Non-video game media ==
- List of non-video game media featuring Mario
- Super Mario films, the franchise from Illumination

== Literature ==
- Super Mario-kun, a 1991 Mario Manga comic series written by Yukio Sawada
- Super Mario Adventures, a 1992 anthology of Manga comics written by Charlie Nozawa

== People ==
Since the appearance of Super Mario Bros., a number of individuals named Mario have been nicknamed "Super Mario" by fans or by the media.

- Mario Andretti (born 1940), American racing driver
- Mario Balotelli (born 1990), Italian footballer
- Mario Basler (born 1968), German footballer
- Mario Cipollini (born 1967), Italian cyclist
- Mario Corti (manager) (born 1946), Swiss businessman
- Mario Draghi (born 1947), Italian banker and public servant
- Mario Dumont (born 1970), Canadian politician
- Mario Elie (born 1963), American basketball player
- Mario Götze (born 1992), German footballer
- Mario Gómez (born 1985), German footballer who also plays for Bayern Munich
- Mário Jardel (born 1973), Brazilian football player
- Mario Lemieux (born 1965), former Canadian ice hockey player
- Mario Mandžukić (born 1986), Croatian footballer who also plays for Juventus
- Mario Matt (born 1979), Austrian alpine skier
- Mario Monti (born 1943), Italian economist and politician
- Mario Reiter (born 1970), Austrian alpine skier
- Mario Salcedo (born 1949 or 1950), a long-term passenger on Royal Caribbean International-branded cruise ships
- Mario Vrančić (born 1989), Bosnian-Herzegovinian footballer
- Mario Williams (born 1985), American football player

== Other uses ==
- Mariusz Pudzianowski (born 1977), strongman and mixed martial artist nicknamed "Super Mariusz" in reference to the video game character Mario
- Supermarionation, a puppetry technique devised in the 1960s by British production company AP Films
- Super Mario Man, later stage name for professional wrestler Ray Candy
- Super Duper Mario, a ringname and parody gimmick of the late American pro wrestler Kurt Koski

== See also ==
- Mario (disambiguation)
- Super Mario Bros. (disambiguation)
- Super Mario Bros. 2 (disambiguation)
- Super Mario World (disambiguation)
