= Mario Bros. (disambiguation) =

Mario Bros. is a 1983 video game.

Mario Bros. may also refer to:

- Mario Bros. (Game & Watch), a Game & Watch game
  - Mario Bros. II, an unofficial sequel to the Game & Watch game
- Mario and Luigi, the eponymous characters who are brothers
- Mario (franchise), a franchise

== See also ==
- Super Mario Bros. (disambiguation)
- Super Mario Bros. 2 (disambiguation)
- Mario (disambiguation)
