= People's Palace, Brisbane =

Heritage-listed building in Brisbane, Queensland

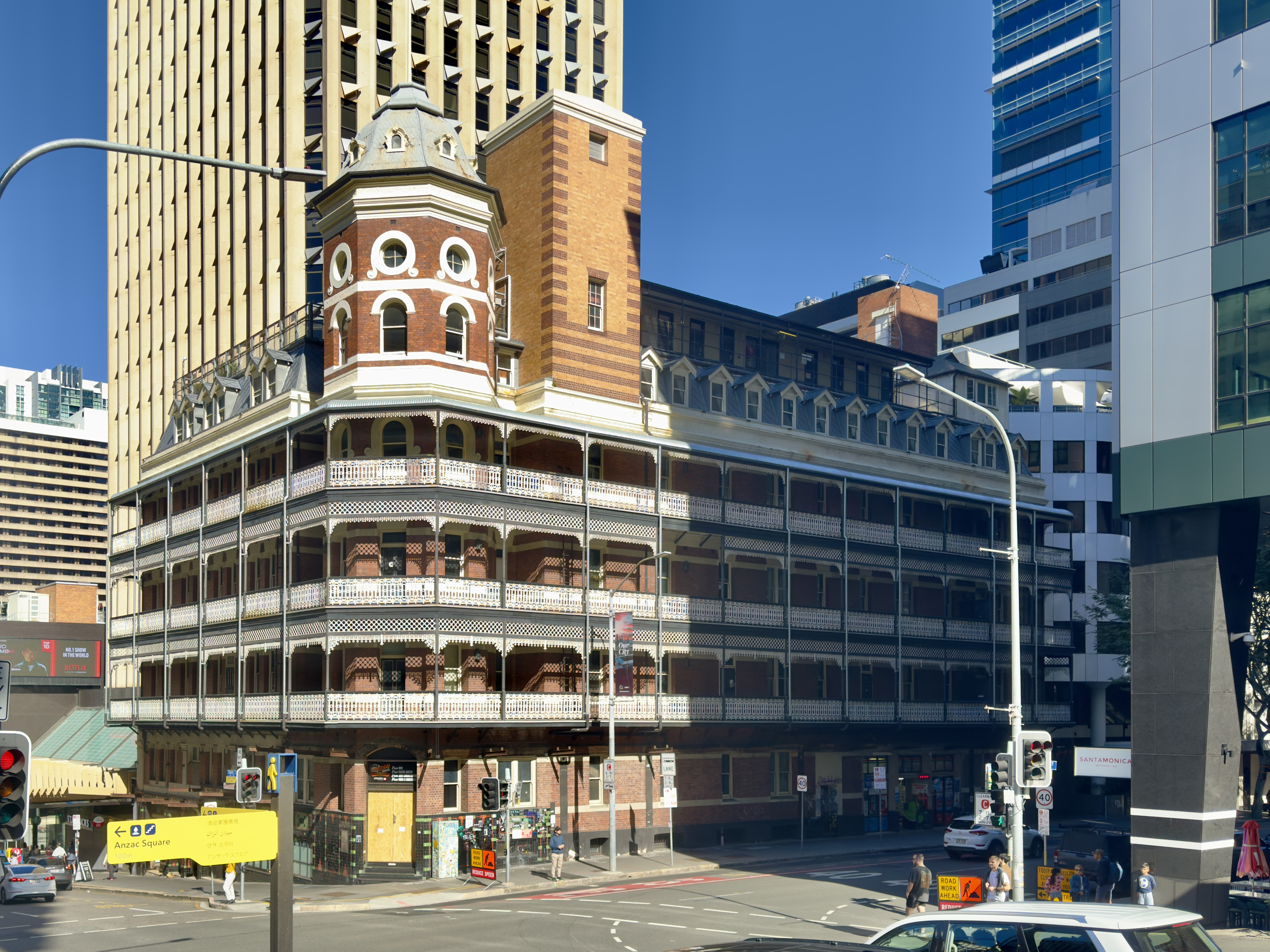
- The People's Palace, 2025

- Location within Queensland
- 27.467°S 153.02544°E
- Location: 308 Edward Street, Brisbane City, City of Brisbane, Queensland, Australia

History
- Design period: 1900–1914 (early 20th century)
- Built: March 1910 – 1911

Site notes
- Architect: Colonel Saunders
- Architectural style: Federation Filigree

Queensland Heritage Register
- Official name: People's Palace
- Type: state heritage (built)
- Designated: 21 October 1992
- Reference no.: 600096
- Significant period: 1910–1911, 1913 (fabric)
- Significant components: elevator

The People's Palace is a heritage-listed building and a former temperance hotel in the Brisbane CBD, City of Brisbane, Queensland, Australia. It is located at 308 Edward Street on the southern corner with Ann Street, diagonally opposite to Brisbane's Central Railway Station. It was designed by Colonel Saunders and built from 1910 to 1911. It was added to the Queensland Heritage Register on 21 October 1992.

== History ==
Commandant Herbert Booth of the Salvation Army first proposed a People's Palace for Brisbane in July 1899, following the success of the People's Palace in Sydney. However, the original vision was intended as a refuge or shelter accommodation.

The People's Palace was built in 1910–1911 by the Salvation Army as a temperance hotel to provide inexpensive "working class" accommodation for travellers. It was designed by the Lieutenant-Colonel Saunders, the Salvation Army's architect and secretary for property affairs. It was situated across the road from the Temperance Hall operated by the Brisbane Total Abstinence Society. The People's Palace comprised three floors of accommodation with 130 rooms, a service basement and a rooftop garden. Construction commenced in March 1910 under Saunders' personal supervision.

The concept of temperance hotels grew out of the temperance movement and the Peoples Palace was the first of its type in Queensland. No alcohol, gambling or "other evils" were permitted on the premises.

Although not quite complete, the hotel was decorated with bright flags and hangings to celebrate Coronation Day (22 June 1911), the coronation of King George V.

The hotel was officially opened on 27 June 1911. It was under the control of Major Wilson assisted by Ensign John McLean. It was popular with travellers to Brisbane due to its convenient location to the Brisbane's Central railway station. The building also was the Queensland headquarters for the Social Wing of the Salvation Army.

In 1913 extensions were undertaken which involved adding an extra two storeys. This created a building of such height that special fire safety measured were imposed. Despite this, many years later, to meet modern fire standards, a set of brick fire stairs had to be added.

In 1929, the Canberra Temperance Hotel operated by the Queensland Prohibition League (later the Queensland Temperance League) opened on the site of the old Temperance Hall.

In the early morning of Thursday 20 January 1938, an electrical wire started a fire and burned out the upper storey. Fortunately the damage was covered by insurance.

Renovations and internal re-arrangements continued over the decades as uses and priorities changed. The building operated as a temperance hotel until 1979. After that, it was leased out as budget accommodation and then used as Salvation Army offices. As of July 2021, it was owned by Yamaji Australia Development (a Japanese property company) and leased to Tourism Adventure Group who operated it as a youth hostel.

== Description ==
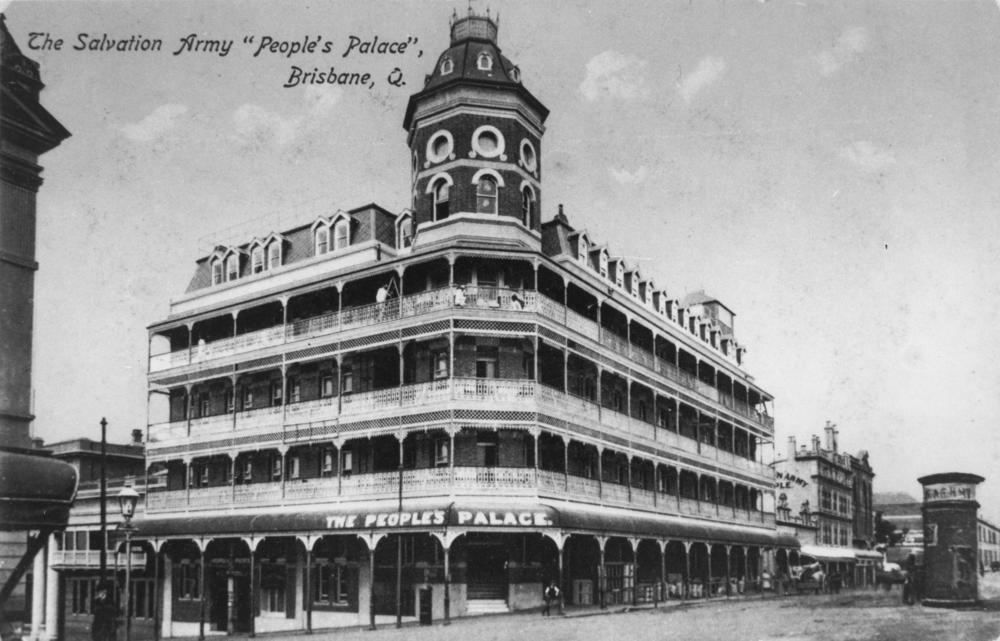
The People's Palace after the addition of 2 more floors, circa 1913

This large Federation style building is a predominantly red brick structure with painted cement rendered trimmings, decorative cast-iron work, and a corner tower.

The plan form is that of a hollow rectangle, with the central opening providing light and air to the rooms. It comprises five storeys plus a basement, and additions above the roof line, it has continuous verandahs on three levels, while the fourth has a steeply pitched roof with red tiles in a diamond pattern punctuated by dormer windows.

The roof level comprises a steeply pitched roof with red tiles arranged in a diamond pattern and dormer windows. The corner octagonal tower, marking the main entrance, has a bell-shaped roof with small dormers in each roof segment. Adjacent to the tower is a polygonal brick lift tower.

The verandah's feature decorative cast iron balustrades and friezes with timber posts and handrails. The semi-circular arched and circular windows to the tower have cream painted cement render dressings to contrast with the red brick.

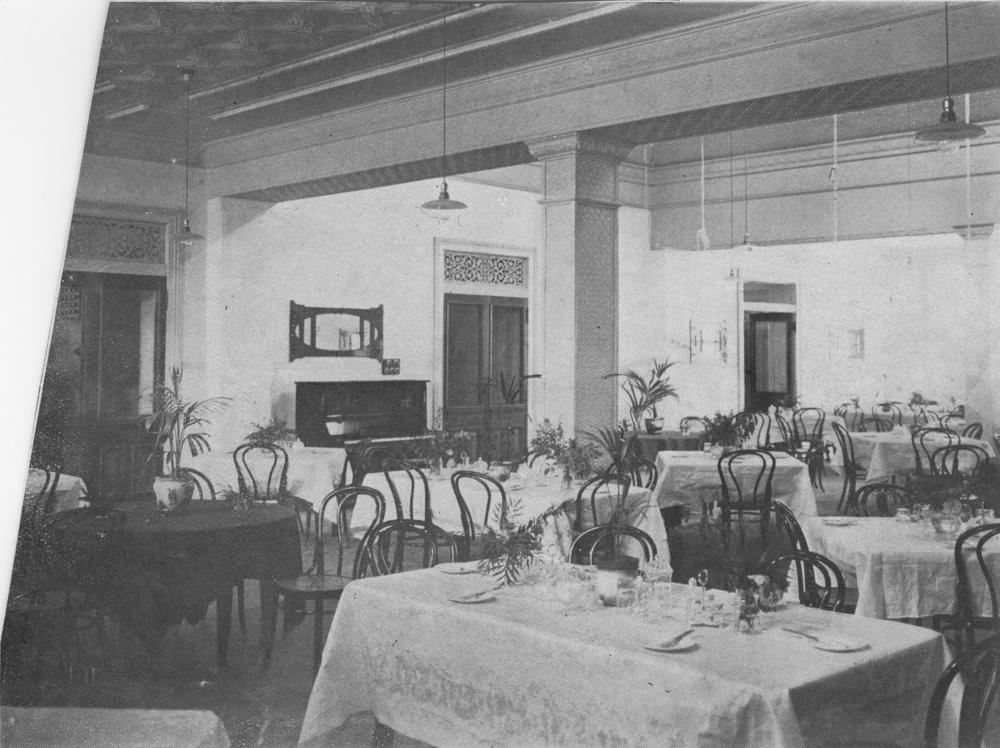
Dining room, 1911

Internally the rectangular courtyard has been divided into two by the insertion of a modern brick fire stair. The hipped roof with clerestory remains above the basement dining saloon in the northern courtyard. This is now used as office space but its original entry doors remain. Pressed metal ceilings remain in many sections of the building. The upper levels have not been refurbished, but the partitioning of the lower levels is not original. The original lift with its sliding doors, timber panelling and surrounding stairwell remains beside the entry foyer.

Its very distinctive appearance derives from the extensive use of decorative cast iron work for the balustrades of its verandahs and from the contrast of the cream-coloured render against the red brick on the upper part of the tower. Being situated on a hill on a busy intersection, it is one of Brisbane's most recognisable buildings.

== Heritage listing ==
People's Palace was listed on the Queensland Heritage Register on 21 October 1992 having satisfied the following criteria.

The place demonstrates rare, uncommon or endangered aspects of Queensland's cultural heritage.

The Peoples Palace is significant as a rare example of a purpose built temperance hotel, it demonstrates rare and uncommon aspects of Queensland's cultural heritage.

The place is important in demonstrating the principal characteristics of a particular class of cultural places.

The building demonstrates the principal characteristics of a Federation building.

The Peoples Palace is important in exhibiting aesthetic characteristics valued by the community in particular, it is a fine example of a Federation brick and render building with the corner entry tower and decorative cast-iron work on the verandahs.

The place is important because of its aesthetic significance.

The Peoples Palace is important in exhibiting aesthetic characteristics valued by the community in particular, it is a fine example of a Federation brick and render building with the corner entry tower and decorative cast-iron work on the verandahs.

The Peoples Palace is significant as a prominent landmark on the corner of Ann and Edward Street with its corner tower being one of a series along Ann Street.

The place has a special association with the life or work of a particular person, group or organisation of importance in Queensland's history.

The building is important for as it has special association with the work of the Salvation Army since 1911, an organisation of importance in Queensland's history.
