= George Marchant =

Australian businessman (1857–1941)

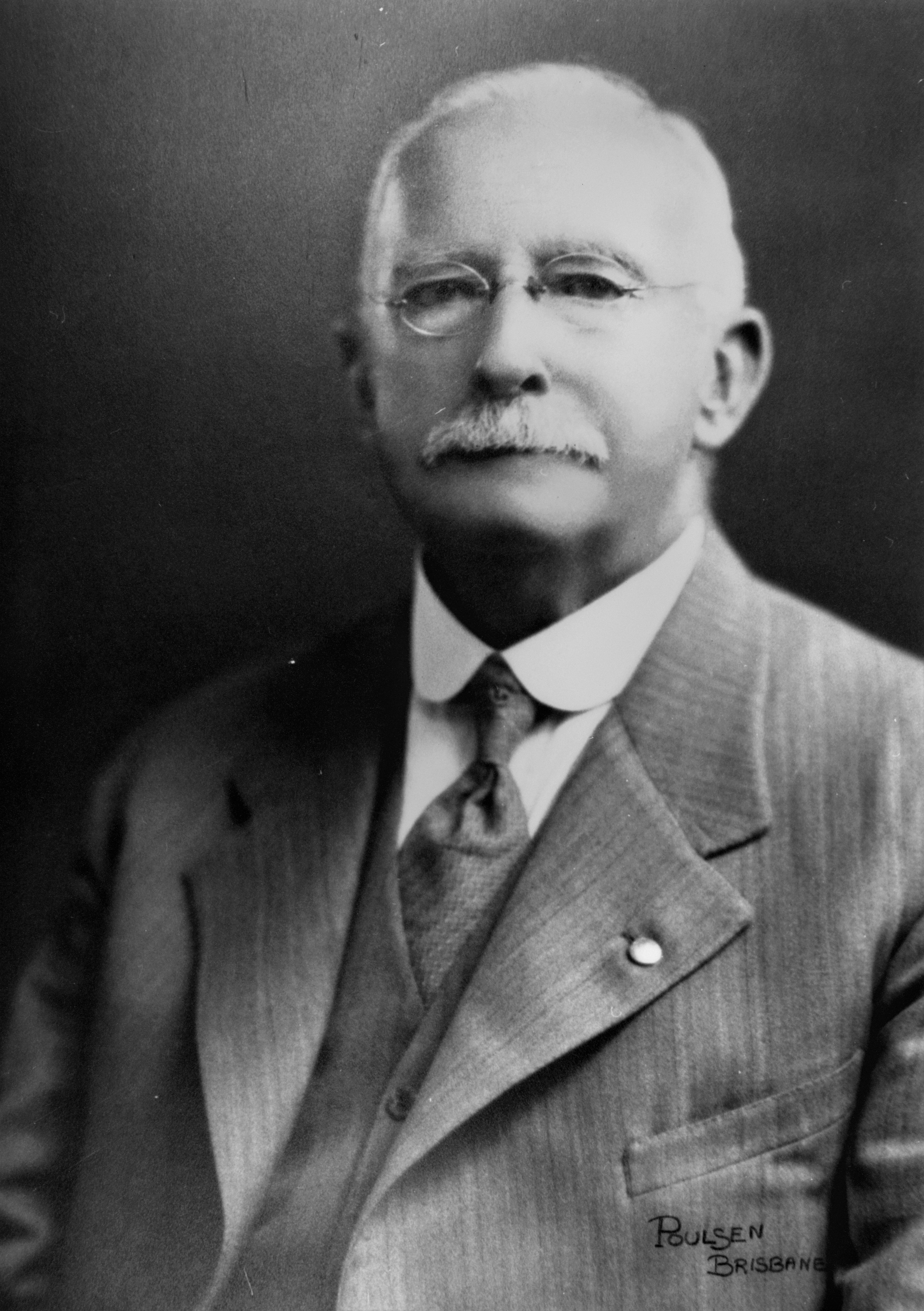
- George Marchant
- Born: 17 November 1857; Brasted, Kent, England
- Died: 5 September 1941 (aged 83); Wilston, Queensland, Australia
- Occupation: Beverage manufacturer
- Spouse: Mary Jane Dwyer (m. 1877; died 1925)

George Marchant (17 November 1857 – 5 September 1941) was a soft-drink manufacturer and philanthropist in Brisbane, Colony of Queensland.

== Early life ==
Marchant was born in Brasted, Kent, England, the son of a builder and hotel keeper. As a boy he became interested in the temperance movement. He arrived in Brisbane, Colony of Queensland on the Ramsey on 9 June 1874 at age 16 with only a few shillings. He worked as a gardener and then a station hand in the country until returning to Brisbane for employment as a carter in an aerated waters factory.

== Business life ==
Marchant purchased the ginger beer manufacturing business of John R. Palmer in Elizabeth Street, Brisbane in 1886. Marchant then opened a factory in Bower Street, Spring Hill, Brisbane and his soft-drink business eventually became the largest in Australia, with other plants in Sydney, Melbourne, Adelaide, and Newcastle.

Marchant believed in social equality and had read Edward Bellamy's Looking Backward: 2000–1887; in 1890 Marchant founded a Bellamy Society. Marchant chaired meetings which raised funds for striking workers and women in his employ were paid more than the average in the food industry. Most of the profits of his business were distributed amongst the employees.

Marchant also invented a bottling machine that came to be used worldwide.

== Philanthropy ==
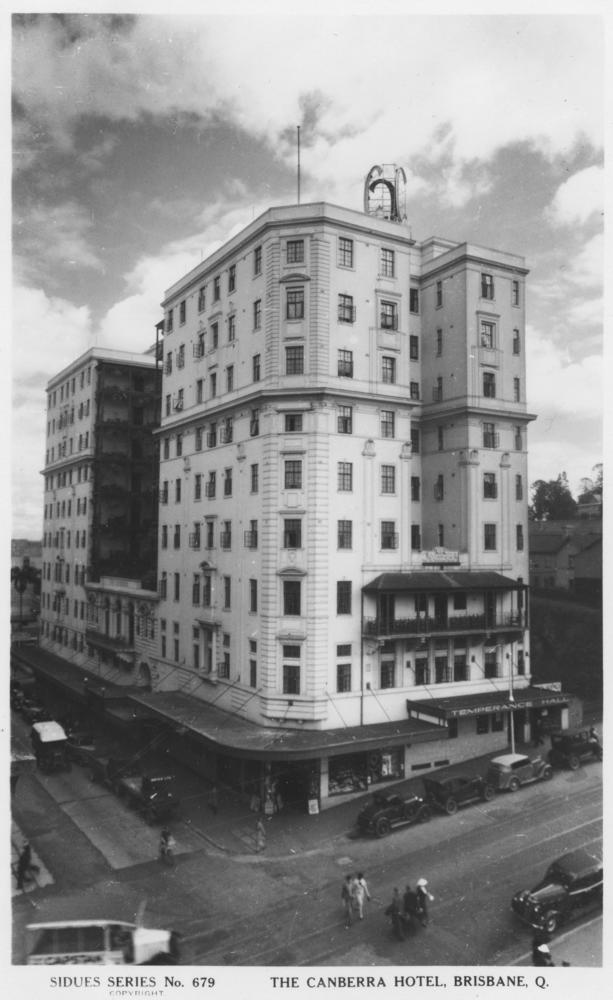
Canberra Hotel, 1939

With his wife, Mary Jane Dwyer, Marchant was the benefactor of many charitable causes, including providing land in Ann St for the New Jerusalem Church and in Chermside, where he donated his horse paddock to the Kedron Shire Council as a park. Marchant Park is named after him. A ward of the Brisbane City Council centred on Chermside is also named Marchant Ward.

He was a major benefactor in the establishment of the Canberra Temperance Hotel in Brisbane, which opened in 1929.

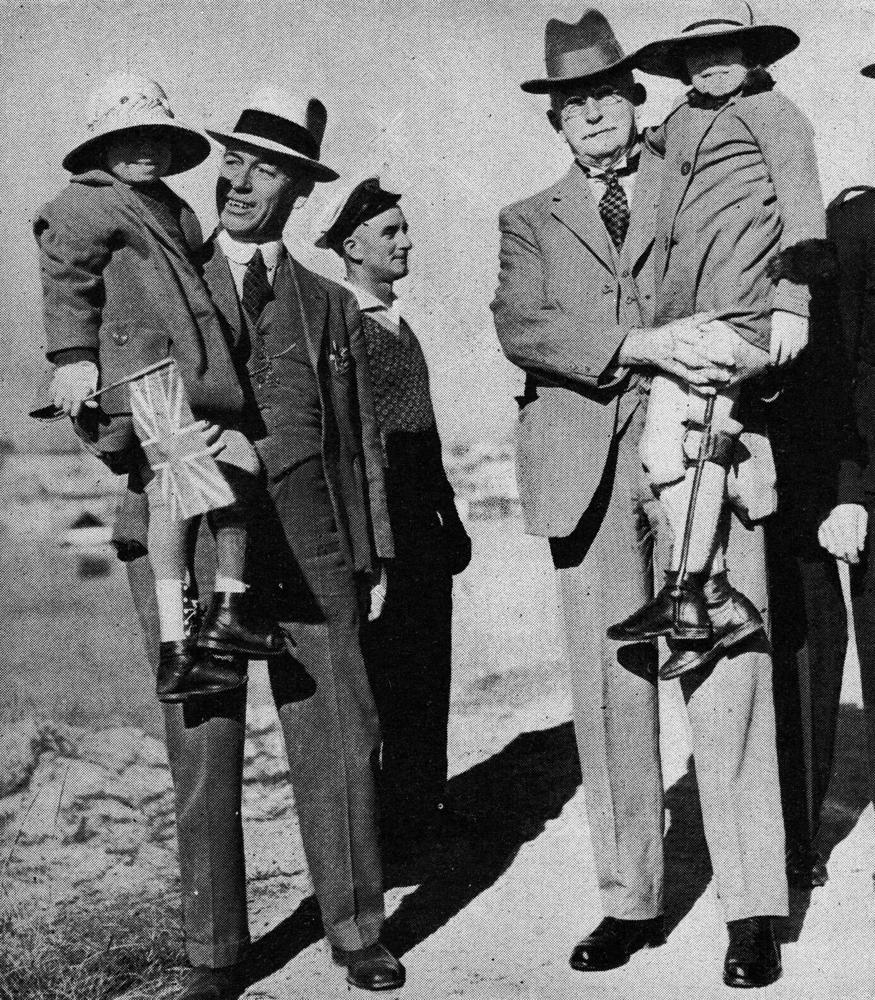
George Marchant (right) with crippled children at Montrose, 1935

In 1932, the Queensland Society for Crippled Children was established to care for children with severe physical disabilities arising from the polio epidemic of 1932. In September 1932, Marchant donated his home Montrose and its 5 acres of gardens at Taringa to the society to establish an institution for the care and treatment of the children. When the number of children needing care became too many to be accommodated in Montrose, Marchant purchased a property at Consort Street, Corinda as a new larger facility which continued to be called Montrose (which is still in use for the care of disabled children in 2015).

== Later life ==
Marchant's wife died in 1925, and he died 5 September 1941.

His soft drink business was purchased in 1964 by Coca-Cola Amatil.

== Awards ==
In 2018, George Marchant was inducted into the Queensland Business Leaders Hall of Fame.
