= Canberra Hotel, Brisbane =

Demolished hotel in Brisbane, Queensland

Coordinates: 27.4667°S 153.0251°E

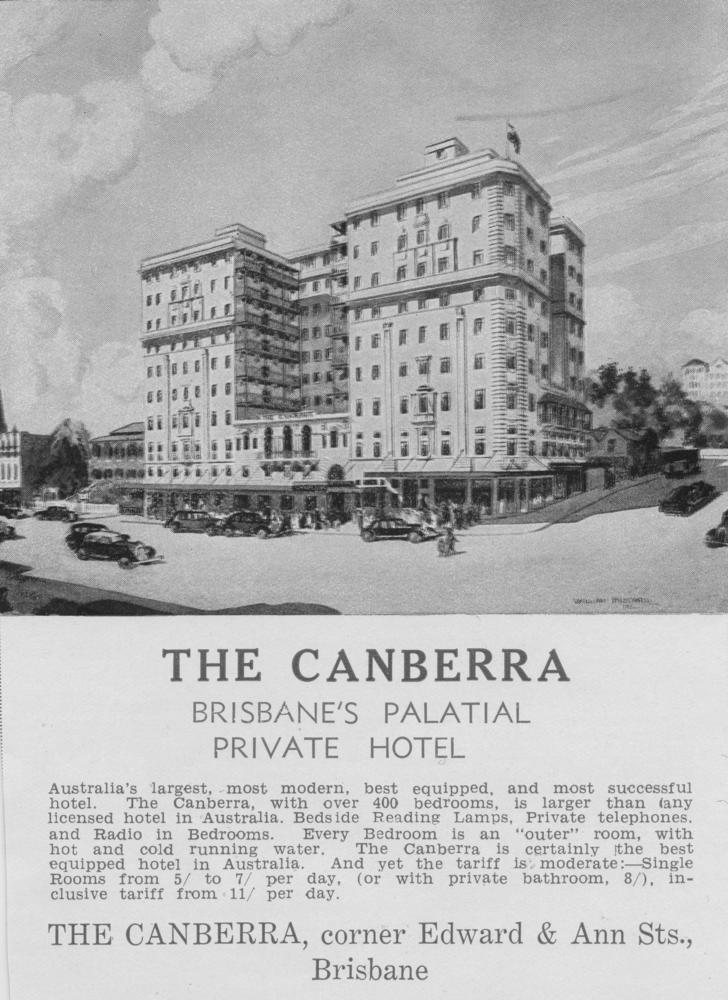
Canberra Hotel, 1935

The Canberra Hotel was a temperance hotel on the western corner of Ann and Edward Streets, Brisbane, Queensland, Australia.

== Temperance Hall ==
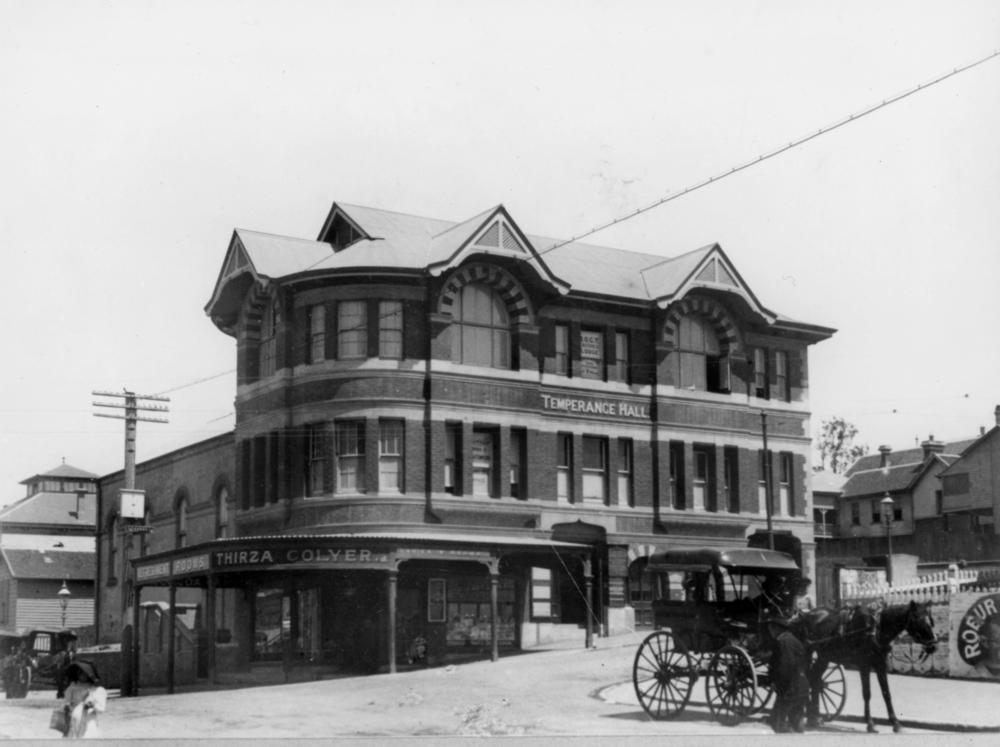
Temperance Hall and the Colyer Refreshment Rooms, circa 1921

The site had long been associated with the temperance movement, having formerly been occupied by the Temperance Hall operated by the Brisbane Total Abstinence Society and located directly opposite the People's Palace (another temperance hotel operated by the Salvation Army). The foundation stone for the Temperance Hall was laid on 28 March 1864 by the Queensland Governor George Bowen, at which time the site was criticised as scarcely so central as one might desire. However, the Temperance Hall itself was not built until 5 years later at a cost of £716.

== Planning for a temperance hotel ==
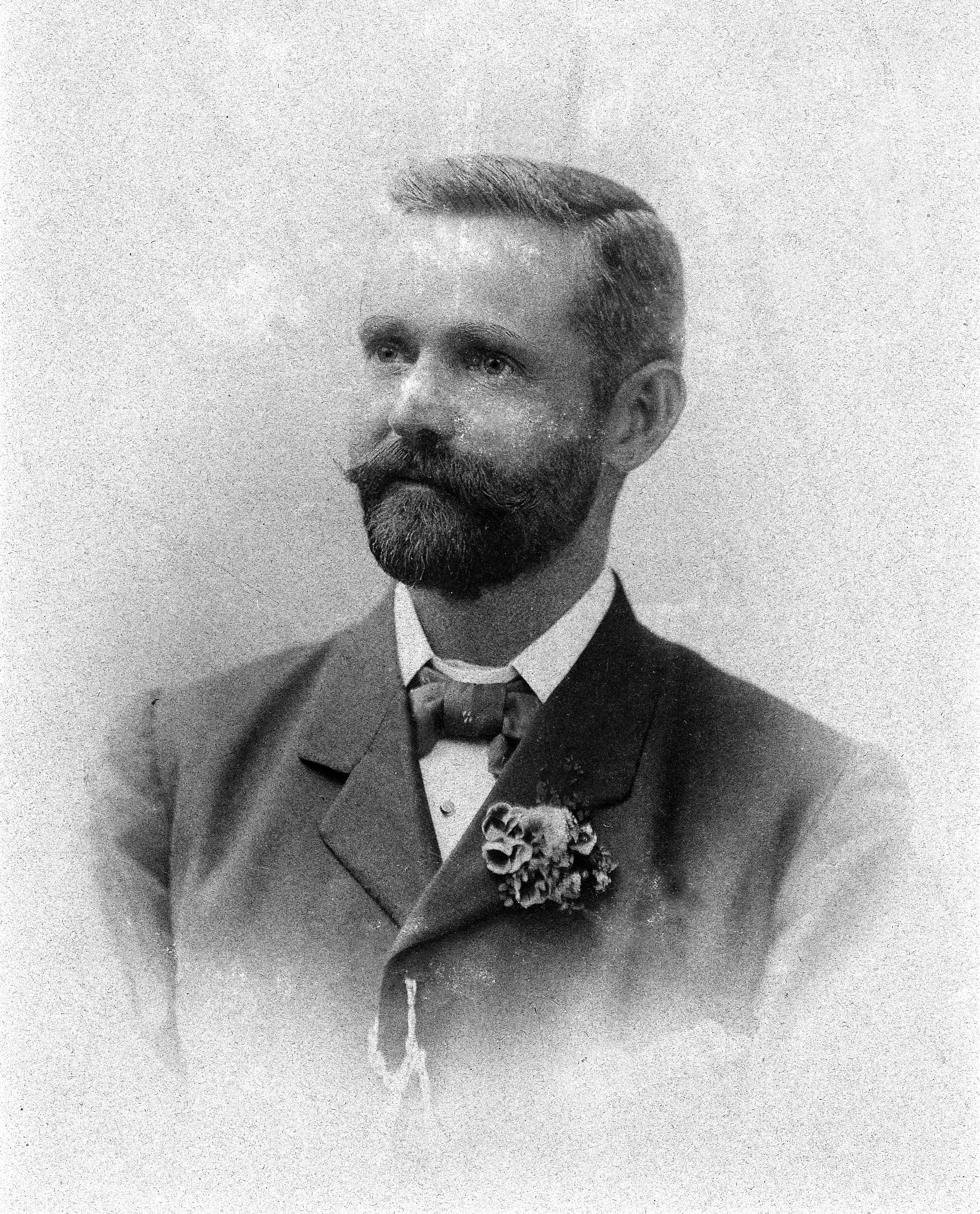
William Robert Black ca. 1898

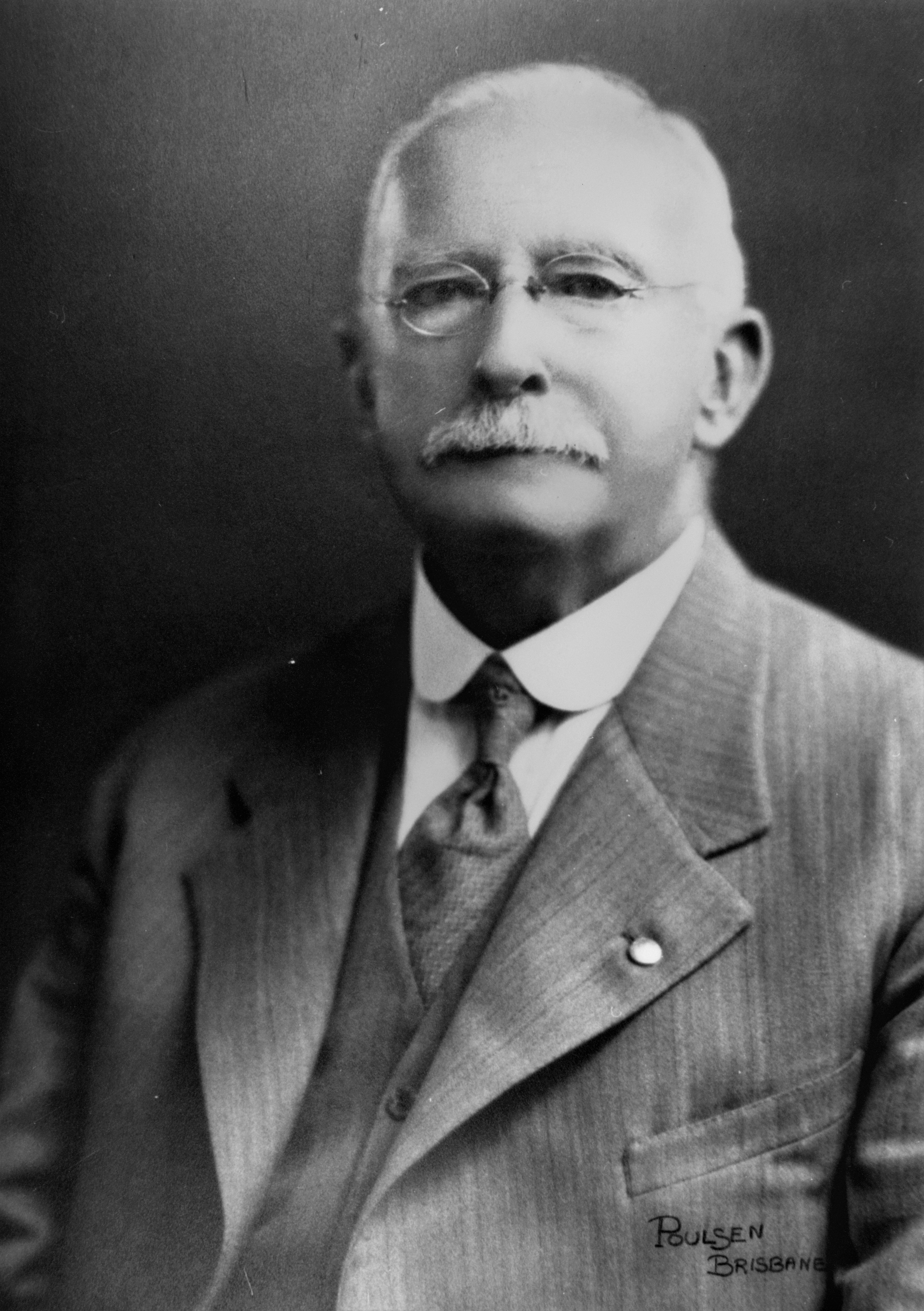
George Marchant

The Canberra Hotel was built by the Queensland Prohibition League (later the Queensland Temperance League). The foundation stone was laid on Saturday 30 July 1927 by the Lord Mayor of Brisbane William Jolly with the intention to build a 5-storey building at a cost of £95,000; coins found buried under the foundation stone of the old Temperance Hall were reburied under the Canberra's foundation stone along with current newspapers and documents relating to the affairs of the Queensland Prohibition League. The architect was Arnold Edwin Brooks. The building was financed by private benefactors, particularly William Robert Black and George Marchant, and through a low-interest loan from the Independent Order of Rechabites (a friendly society committed to temperance). There was ill-feeling that Black and Marchant were levied for gift tax by the Queensland Government in relation to their donations, but in July 1929 as the building neared completion, an act of parliament was passed to exempt these donations from gift tax.

In January 1928, it was decided to add two more storeys to the building (seven in total) and to provide hot and cold water into each room, increasing the cost to £120,000.

== The opening ==
The seven-story concrete-reinforced building was constructed by Blair Cunningham and the Canberra Temperance Hotel was officially opened on 20 July 1929 by George Marchant. Portraits of the benefactors Black and Marchant were unveiled in the dining room; these had been commissioned from Sydney artist Norman St Clair Carter in January 1929. The dinner to celebrate the opening was marred by the Queensland Treasurer Walter Henry Barnes and Member of the Queensland Legislative Assembly Mick Kirwan walking out after the loyal toast. They had noticed that the order of proceedings had the toast to the Queensland Parliament as the last toast (after the toasts to the benefactors, the temperance league and associated societies, the architect and builder); they felt this was a serious breach of protocol insulting to the Queensland Parliament.

== Operations ==
Despite doubts expressed by others, the Canberra Hotel proved that a high quality hotel could be successful without the sale of alcohol. It was very popular, attracting 442,001 guests between 1930 and 1935. In 1934, a decision was made to add a further 3 storeys with 200 beds in larger bedrooms with private bathrooms; the original architect Arnold Brooks had designed the building to be structurally able to be extended in this way. The extensions would make it the largest hotel in Australia.

The Lamplight Bar at the Canberra was the first non-alcoholic bar in Queensland and specialised in virgin cocktails and was claimed to have the widest range of non-alcoholic beverages in Australia. As it did not serve alcohol, it was a popular choice for school formals and Methodist weddings. The wedding of Joh and Flo Bjelke-Petersen was held at the Canberra in 1952.

In September 1952, it was announced that a second 11-storey block would be built in Ann Street between the existing hotel and the Brisbane School of Arts to provide another 200 rooms at the cost of £200,000.

== Closure and demolition ==
The temperance league sold the hotel in 1985 and the new owner applied for a liquor license and served alcohol for the first time on the premises on 3 March 1986.

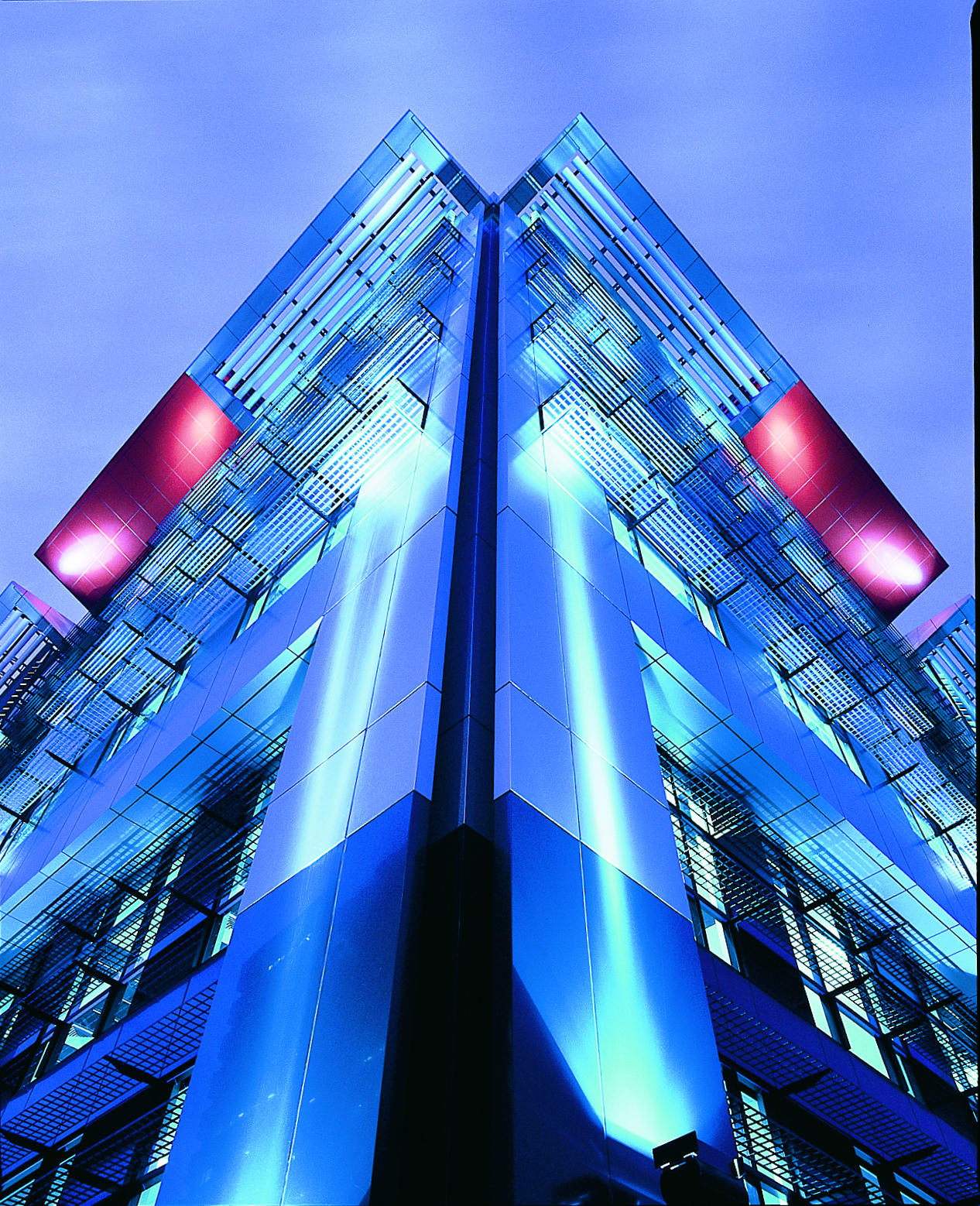
Mincom building, 2004

In 1987, the hotel was closed and demolished to build a 104-storey office tower called Central Place, which would have been the world's tallest building at that time; however; that project never commenced. Later an office tower for software developer Mincom was built on the site.

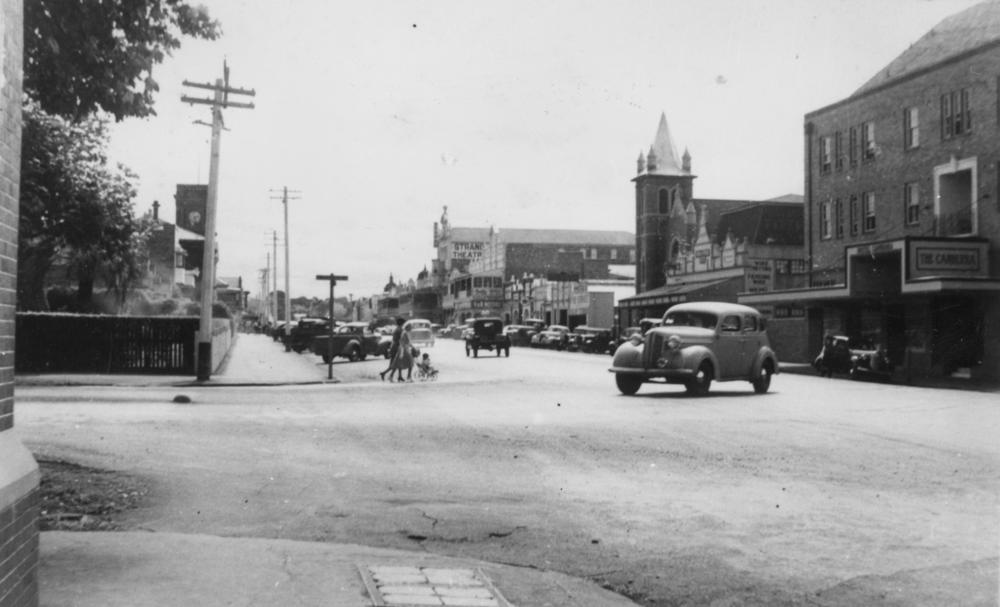
Canberra Hotel (on the right), Toowoomba, Queensland, circa 1948

Other Canberra Hotels were established or planned in other Queensland towns by the temperance league.

The Queensland Temperance League expanded its range of intervention and support programs from alcohol to include drugs and mental health. In 2015, it operates as Healthy Options Australia and is one of Australia's leading service providers in the prevention, treatment and rehabilitation services in these areas.
