= Coffee palace =

Type of residential hotel

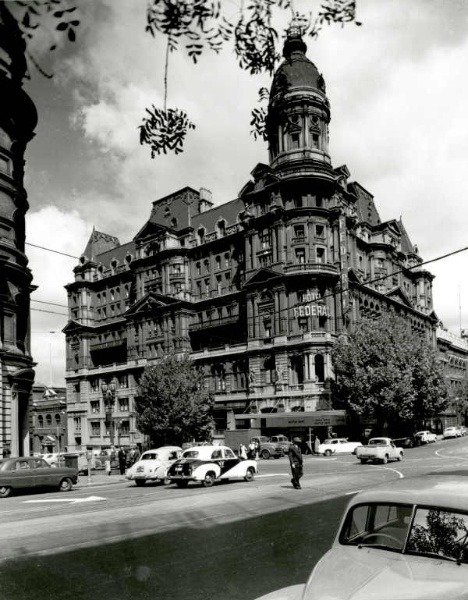
The Federal Coffee Palace, built in Collins Street, Melbourne, in 1888, was the largest and grandest Coffee Palace ever built. It was demolished in 1973.

A coffee palace was an often large and elaborate residential hotel that did not serve alcohol, most of which were built in Australia in the late 19th century.

A modest temperance hotel was opened in 1826 by activist Gerrit Smith in his hometown of Peterboro, New York, United States. It was not popular with locals, nor commercially successful.

Temperance hotels were first established in the UK in the 1850s to provide an alcohol-free alternative to corner pubs and residential hotels, and by the 1870s they could be found in every town and city, some quite large and elaborate. In the late 1870s the idea caught on in Australia, where the appellation "coffee palace" was almost universal, and dozens were built in the 1880s and early 1890s, including some of the largest hotels in the country. Due to the depression of the mid-1890s, some became ordinary hotels and others were converted to different uses. The name continued to be applied to smaller residential hotels and guest houses in the early 20th century, until the trend died out. As large old hotels that may never have been a financial success, many, including most of the largest, were eventually demolished.

== History ==
In the 17th and 18th centuries, "coffee houses", which were like taverns, but sold the new beverage of coffee rather than alcohol, became popular in the United Kingdom, but died out by the late 18th century.

Beginning in the early 19th century in the United States, the temperance movement campaigned against the moral, economical and medical effects of overindulgence in alcoholic beverages, a campaign which soon evolved into the promotion of total abstinence. By the early 1830s the temperance movement began in earnest in the United Kingdom, starting in the north, and soon spread all over the country. The movement built or converted its own premises for meetings, entertainment, food and accommodations, with the first "temperance hotel" opening in 1833 in Preston, with 22 across the north and the Midlands by 1835 (though not all offered accommodation).

Intended as an alternative to the corner pub, they were often about the same size, and just about every town of any size soon had at least one. As well as "temperance hotel", many other names were used such as temperance bar, coffee tavern, coffee rooms, temperance tavern, or just a named hotel that was advertised as a temperance venue. In the 1870s, with an established market, larger and more elaborate temperance hotels began to be built, a trend which continued into the 1880s, and some of these were called a "coffee palace". Examples included the 1872 French Renaissance style Trevelyan Temperance Hotel, Boar Lane, Leeds, and the Cobden Coffee Palace, Corporation Street, Birmingham, built in 1883 in a striking Gothic Revival style (demolished).

The Temperance movement in Australia was established shortly after its beginnings in the UK, for instance, the temperance society in Melbourne was formed in 1837. This was followed by the Melbourne Total Abstinence Society in 1842, the Independent Order of Rechabites in 1847, and in 1885 the Women's Christian Temperance Union. Tankard's Temperance Hotel, an alcohol-free residential hotel, was established in the 1850s, in the western end of the city.

In Australia, the same imperative for their construction applied as in the UK, as expressed at a meeting at the Melbourne Temperance Hall in October 1878, to build a place "... as attractive as possible for the working man, [which] should combine every facility for harmless amusement and intellectual enjoyment, with the advantages of a large hotel, the only difference being that coffee should be vended instead of intoxicating liquors". A major point of difference to the UK examples however was that they were built "on a business basis" rather than as a subsidised or not for profit venture. The first "coffee house" companies were founded soon after that meeting in Melbourne, Sydney and Adelaide, and the first to be built, the Collingwood Coffee Palace, opened in Smith Street, Fitzroy in 1879, followed by the grandly ornate Melbourne Coffee Palace in Bourke Street the city in 1882.

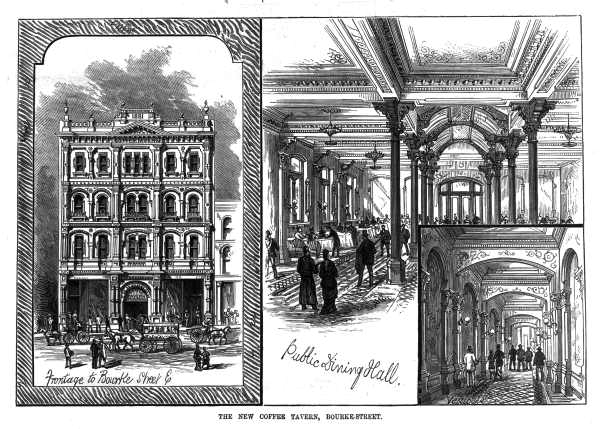
The Melbourne Coffee Palace, built in Bourke Street in 1881, was one of the earliest truly grand coffee palaces in Australia, featuring ornate interiors such as a grand dining room

Their promotion occurred at a time of great economic growth in Australia, which perhaps combined with the "moral superiority" behind them, led to their rapid popularity and the construction of many often quite large and elaborate "temperance hotels" in the following decade, nearly always called Coffee Palaces. The greatest growth occurred in Melbourne, then in the throes of a "land boom", with land rising steeply in value and large buildings built to capitalise on that value. This coincided with the popularity of what is now called High Victorian architecture, lavish buildings with richly ornamented facades and interiors, usually Renaissance Revival, perhaps combined with Second Empire elements. The coffee palaces were invariably built in this elaborate High Victorian style.

The Scots Presbyterian James Munro, politician and leading Land Boomer, was a champion of the temperance movement in Victoria; in 1886 he formed a company that purchased an already prominent hotel, the Grand on Spring Street built three years previously, and converted it into a temperance hotel, the Grand Coffee Palace, reputedly burning the liquor licence.

The Federal Coffee Palace, built in 1888 on the corner of Collins and King Street in the western end of Melbourne's CBD was the largest hotel built in Australia, and the Grand Coffee Palace at the other end of the city was the second largest in Melbourne, while the Queens Coffee Palace in Carlton was possibly the third (though it appears to never have opened as a hotel, instead becoming residential apartments). In Sydney the Grand Central Coffee Palace built in 1889 was almost as big the contemporary Metropole and Australia Hotels, but they were the better known and patronised.

The boom lasted a little more than a decade, ending with the banking crisis of 1893, and a severe economic depression. The coffee palaces lost custom to the licensed hotels they were sometimes built to compete with, while others were built for patrons that never came, and so struggled to survive. Some were converted into guest houses or private hotels (or in one case a school), while others applied for liquor licences and dropped the "coffee palace" title.

The "coffee palace" title was however taken up in the early 20th century for usually small residential hotels / guest houses, often in resort or country towns, to indicate they were not licensed, but they fell short of the grandeur the name implied (such as the 1901 Yarram Coffee Palace, about the size of a corner pub).

The larger examples were essentially large Victorian-era hotels with numerous small rooms, and those that had not continued as hotels often became cheap boarding houses by the mid 20th century, especially in the Melbourne suburbs, and a few were demolished from the 1950s-1970s. Many significant examples still survive, though very few still operate as hotels. The most famous survivor is the Hotel Windsor, the renamed Grand Coffee Palace that James Munro had established, which re-gained its liquor licence in 1897, and changed name in 1920, and is Australia's major surviving grand 19th century hotel.

== Coffee palaces ==
=== Australia ===
==== Victoria ====
===== Melbourne =====
- Collingwood Coffee Palace (originally proposed as Fitzroy Coffee Palace and Workers Club), 232 Smith Street, Fitzroy. It was named Collingwood despite actually being on the Fitzroy side of the street. Ground level opened in late 1879, the top two floors added by late 1880. In the early 20th century floors were added and it was subsumed into a department store, of which only the facade remains propped atop a supermarket.
- Prahran Coffee Palace, Chapel Street, Prahran, 1880 (demolished?)
- Victoria Coffee Palace, Collins Street adjacent to the Melbourne Town Hall, 1880 (occupying a building that had opened as the Victoria Club in 1877). The Collins Street frontage was demolished when the town hall was extended in the 1920s, but the Little Collins Street part, built 1880s and 1920s, survives as the Victoria Hotel
- Coffee Tavern No 2, 516-518 Flinders Street, 1880. Closed 1897, became a warehouse then offices, then a licensed brothel in 1990.
- Melbourne Coffee Palace, Bourke Street, 1882, demolished c1970.
- Richmond Coffee Palace, 1888, Swan Street, Richmond. Closed c1900.
- St Kilda Coffee Palace, Grey Street, St Kilda, 1883 St Kilda - recently Coffee Palace Backpackers, and now the Selina Hotel (2021).
- Grand Coffee Palace, Spring Street, first stage built as a hotel in 1884, became a Coffee Palace in 1886, extended 1888, licence reinstated 1897, renamed the Hotel Windsor) in 1920s.
- Oriental Coffee Palace, later Gladstone Hotel, Victoria Street, 1888 North Melbourne
- Albert Park Coffee Palace, later The Biltmore, Albert Park, 1887.
- Mentone Coffee Palace, Mentone, 1887. Closed 1904, and purchased to become the nucleus of Kilbreda College.
- South Yarra Coffee Palace, cnr Toorak Road and Claremont Street, 1887 now the Hotel Claremont Guesthouse.
- Federal Coffee Palace, Corner of Collins and King Streets, Melbourne, 1888, demolished 1972.
- Queen's Coffee Palace, 1 Rathdowne Street, Carlton, 1888 (but never opened as a hotel), demolished c1970
- West Melbourne Coffee Palace, Victoria Street, probably on the corner of Roden Street, West Melbourne, c1888 demolished.
- Sandringham Coffee Palace, "adjoining railway station", 1889, known by 1894 as Sandringham House, Sandringham, demolished. (possibly the site of current Sandringham Hotel).
- Hawthorn Coffee Palace, Burwood Road Hawthorn near Glenferrie Road, c1890 demolished.
- McCaughans Coffee Palace, Spencer Street, Melbourne, 1891, now Great Southern Hotel
- Newport Coffee Palace, 24 Newcastle Street, Newport, 1891 Became a guest house in the 1920s, converted to apartments in the later 20th century.
- Grand Coffee Palace, Mornington, 1889. Converted to Grand Hotel 1892.
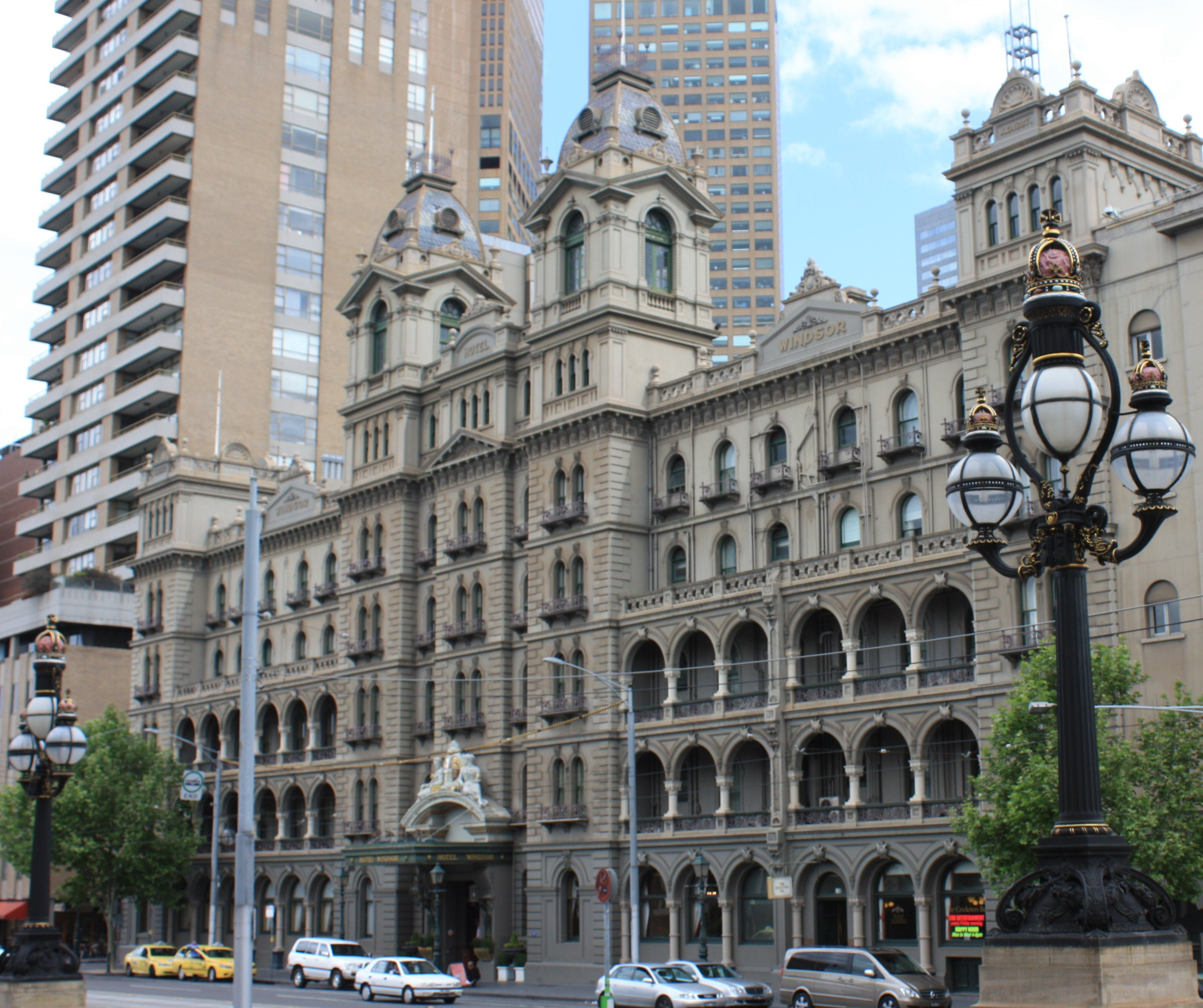
Hotel Windsor (formerly the Grand Coffee Palace)

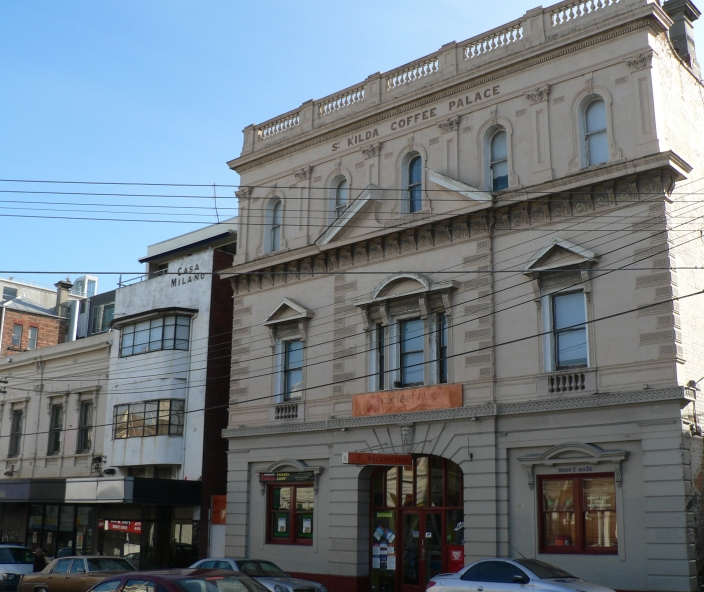
St Kilda Coffee Palace – now backpackers hostel

Mentone Coffee Palace – now Kilbreda Girls' School

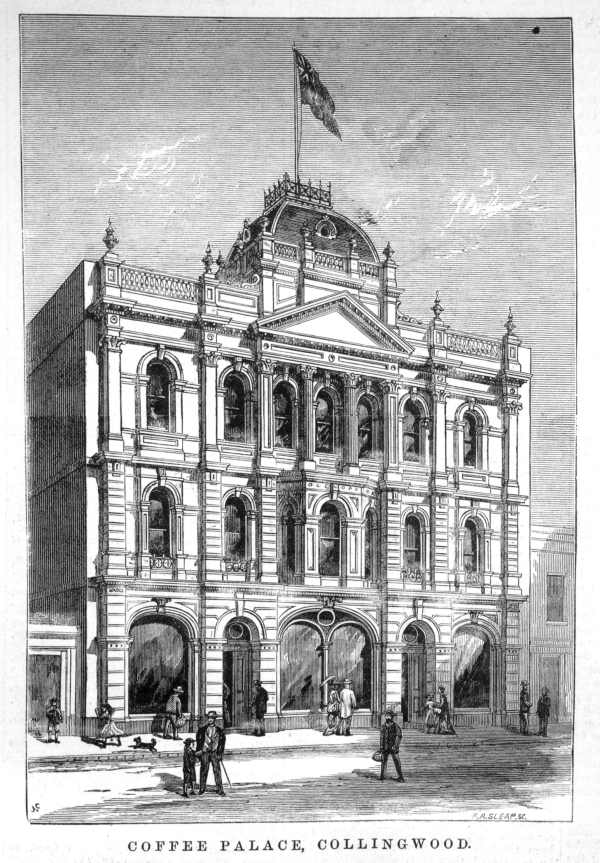
Collingwood Coffee Palace

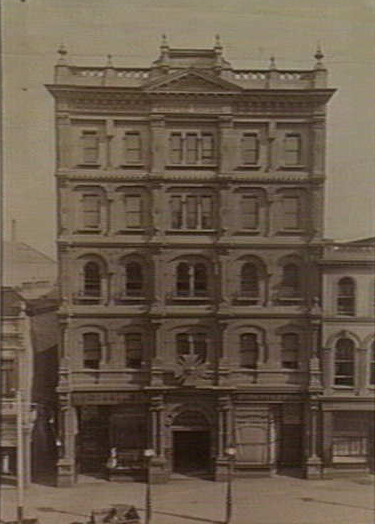
Melbourne Coffee Palace

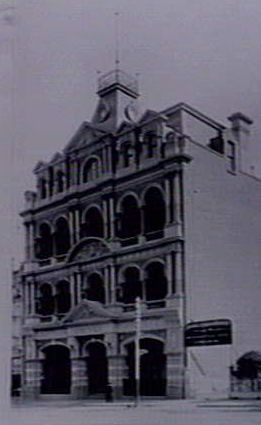
Hawthorn Coffee Palace

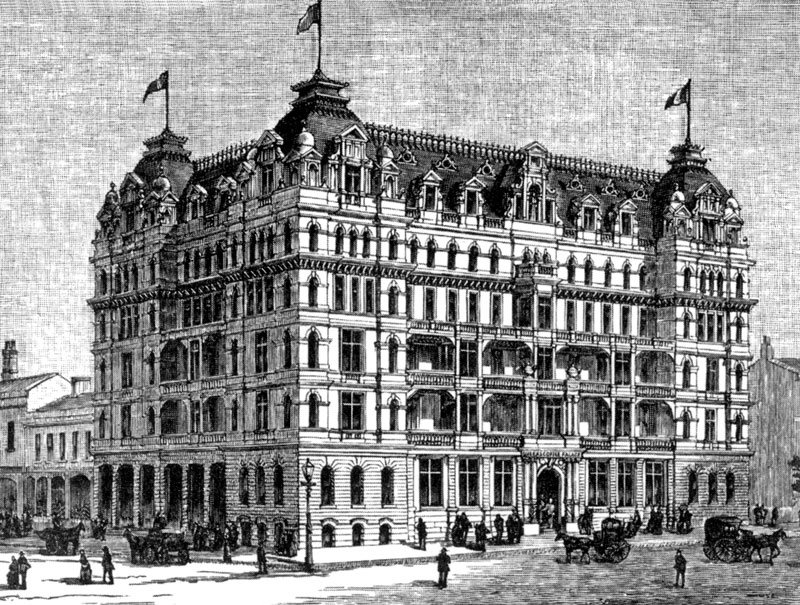
Queens Coffee Palace

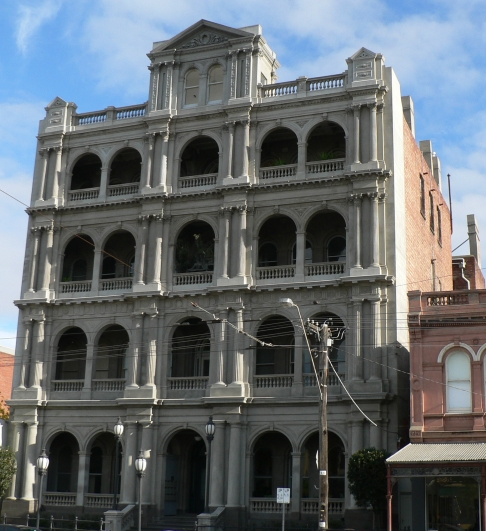
Albert Park Coffee Palace

===== Ballarat =====
- Andrew's Coffee Palace, Armstrong Street
- Reid's Coffee Palace, (1886 and 1888), verandah late 1890s now Reid's Guest House.
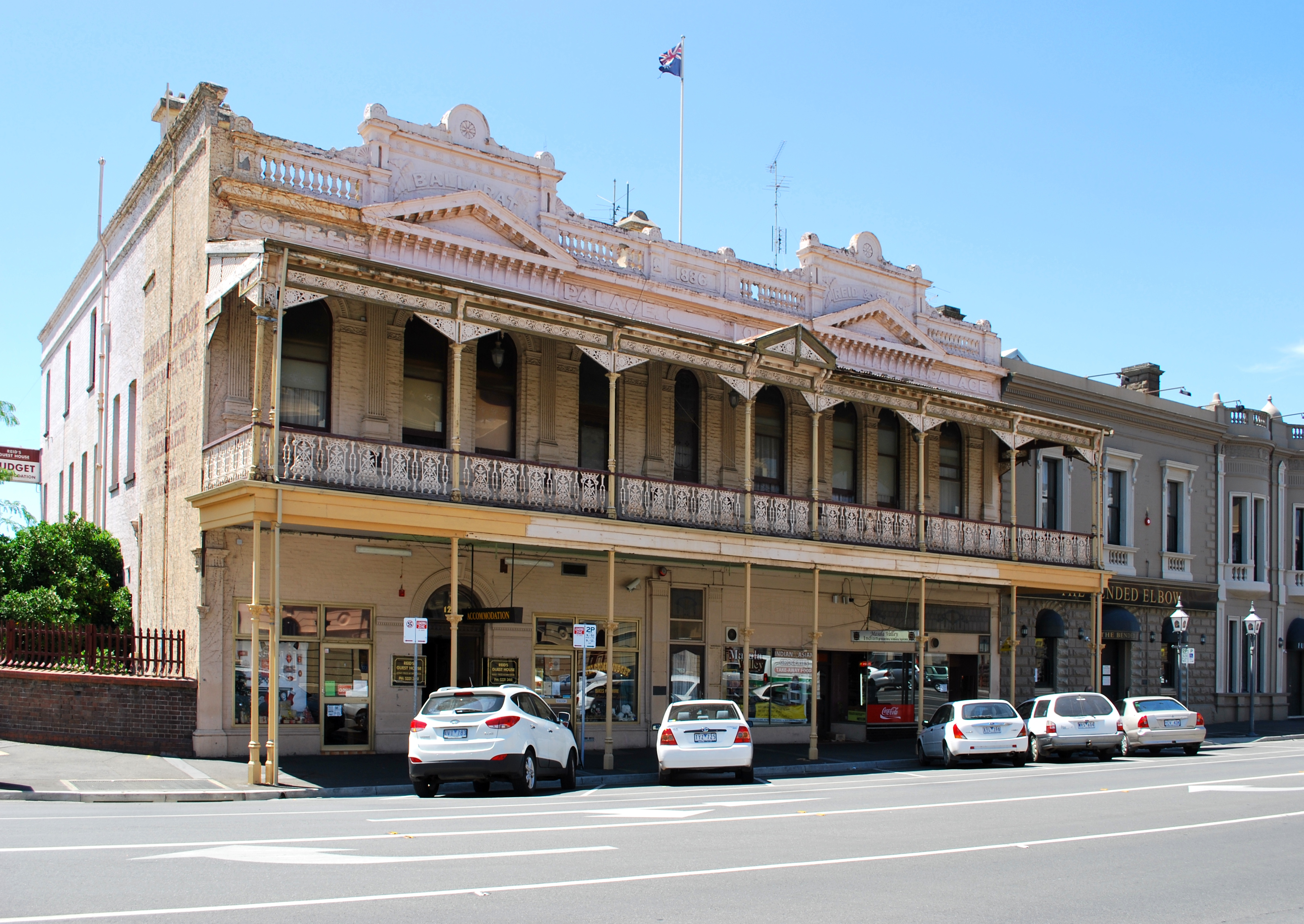
Reid's Coffee Palace, Ballarat

===== Bendigo =====
- Sandhurst Coffee Palace (demolished)
- Central Coffee Palace (demolished)
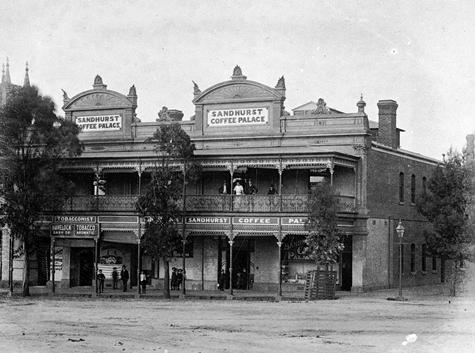
Sandhurst Coffee Palace in 1890

===== Bellarine Peninsula =====
- Barwon Heads Coffee Palace, facing mouth of Barwon River, 1889, renamed Mt Colite Hotel, destroyed by fire 1928, site now Barwon Heads Hotel
- Ocean Grove Coffee Palace, later Green Gables and The Chalet, 1888, demolished late 1960s
- Grand Hotel, 1881, now Vue Grand, sometimes described as a coffee palace.
- Sea View Coffee Palace, cnr Hesse and Stokes Streets, described as a Coffee Palace from 1899, now Sea View Guest House.
- Federal Coffee Palace, Hesse Street, Queenscliff, location and date uncertain

===== Other =====
- Castlemaine Coffee Palace, later Bailie's Coffee Palace, then Midland Private Hotel, 2 Templeton Street, Castlemaine, c1890
- Federal Coffee Palace, Yarram, 1901.
- Geelong Coffee Palace, originally Macks Hotel, Brougham Terrace (formerly Corio Terrace), refurbished and reopened as a Coffee Palace in 1888, name returned to Mack's Hotel (still without a licence) in 1891, demolished
- Grand Coffee Palace, Bairnsdale, 1889, demolished 1970s.
- Kyneton Coffee Palace, 104-114 Millison Street, Kyneton, 1881. Last mentions in 1907, demolished.
- Marnoo Coffee Palace, Marnoo.
- Mildura Coffee Palace, Mildura, 1891, 1919 became the Grand Hotel, with licence.
- Murtoa Coffee Palace, Murtoa
- Ozone Coffee Palace, Warrnambool, 1889, refurbished in 1920 and reopened as Hotel Mansions, full licence granted in 1923, destroyed by fire 1929.
- Victoria Coffee Palace, Nolan Street, Maryborough
- Wimmera Coffee Palace, Horsham, 1918 Horsham, demolished.

==== Tasmania ====
- Imperial (Hobart) Coffee Palace, Hobart. Built in two sections, firstly in the 1880s then extended in 1910. Cast iron verandah, balcony and mansard roof were removed during the 1950s and the 1910 extension was demolished in the 1960s.
- Tasmanian Coffee Palace, Hobart, Tasmania, 89 Macquarie Street (established in Ingle Hall which was built c1814). Also known as Norman's Coffee Palace, the Orient, and Anderson's, late 19th century. Now home to the Mercury Print Museum.
- Federal (Sutton's) Coffee Palace (later Metropole), 67 Brisbane Street, Launceston, Tasmania. Demolished 1976.
- Shield's Temperance Hotel (Shield's Coffee Palace), 77 Esplanade, Launceston. Ironically established in the former Burten Brewery in 1859, the building was eventually reduced in size as the Monds Flour Mills expanded in the early 20th century with the building finally being demolished in the 1950s.
- Commonwealth Coffee Palace, 23-29 Tamar Street, Launceston, Tasmania (demolished 1960s)
- The Coffee Palace, Bishopsbourne. Active in 1904. The building was once a pub known as The Bush Inn (built prior 1842). Now a residence.
Launceston Coffee Palace, Brisbane Street

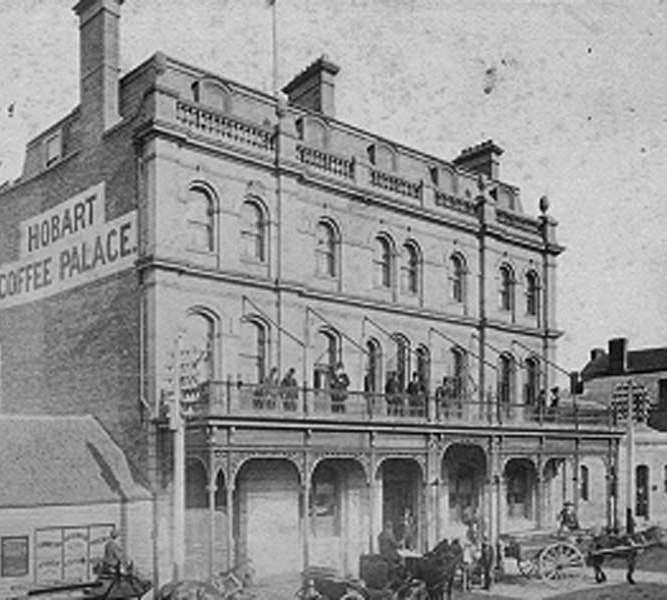
The Imperial, Hobart

==== South Australia ====
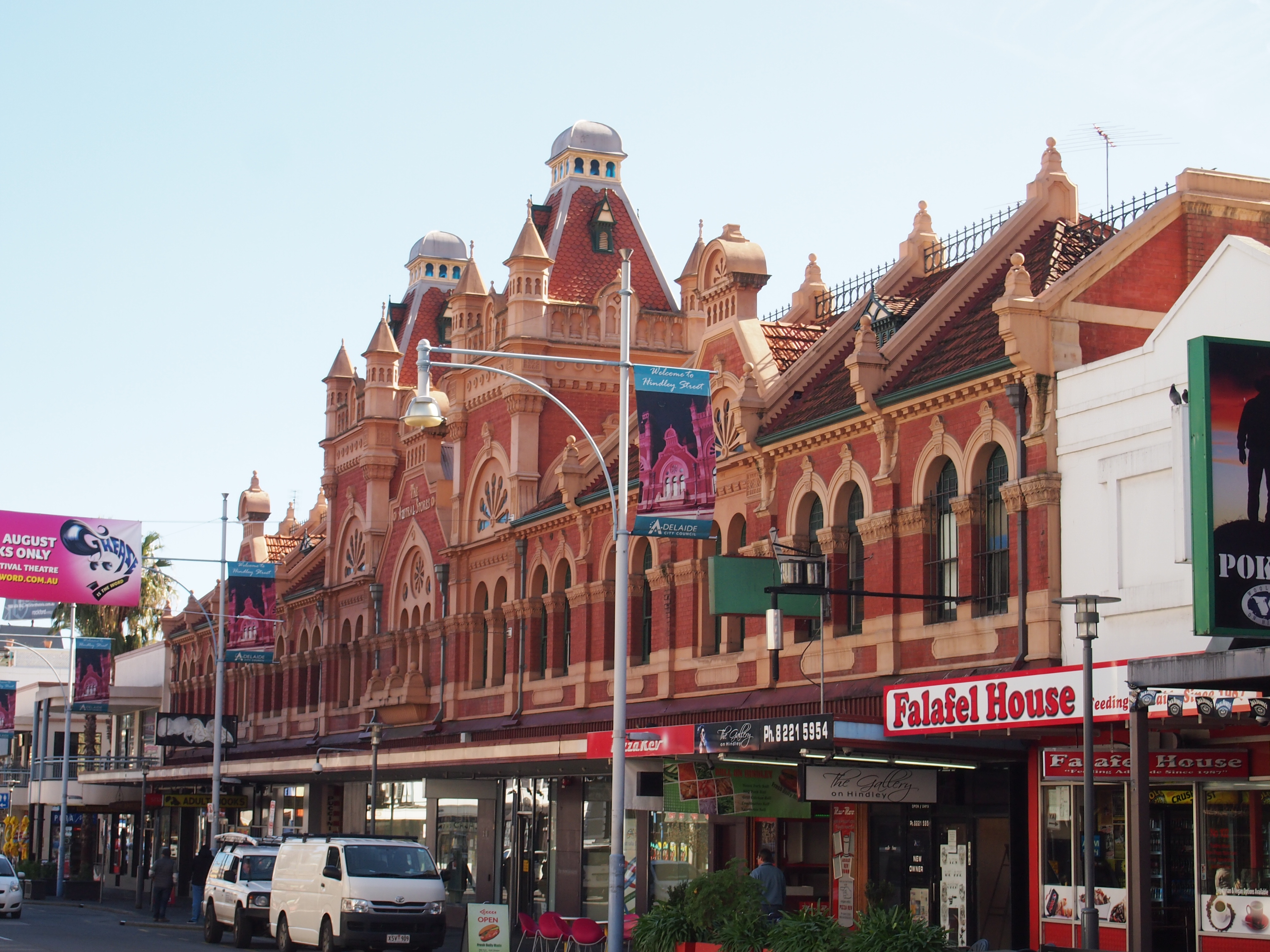
West's Coffee Palace, Adelaide

- Grand Coffee Palace, Hindley Street, Adelaide, (1891). Rebuilt 1907, now Plaza Hotel.
- Grayson's Coffee Palace, Adelaide city centre (1887). Demolished 1918, replaced by what is now the Grosvenor Hotel.
- Grant's Coffee Palace, 110 Hindley Street, Adelaide, (1908). Built 1903 as Austral Stores, becoming Grant's Coffee Palace in 1908, then West's Coffee Palace in 1919. The building remains to this day.
- Port Pioneer Coffee Palace, Commercial Road, Port Adelaide. (1879)
- Kieselbach Coffee Palace, Mount Gambier (1884). Later the Palace Hotel.
- Semaphore Coffee Palace, 80 the Esplanade, Semaphore (c1910). Later Wondergraph Café now Evancourt Private Hotel.

==== New South Wales ====
===== Sydney =====
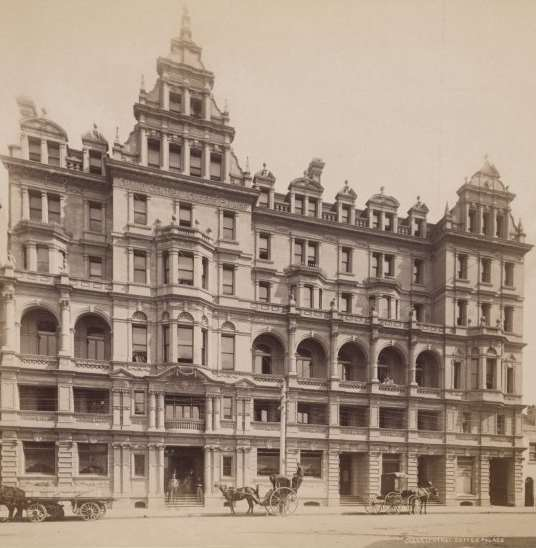
Grand Central Coffee Palace, Sydney

- Johnsons Temperance Coffee Palace, York Street, Sydney. (1879)
- Sydney Coffee Palace Hotel / Sydney Coffee Palace No 1, 393-397 George Street, Sydney (1880, a conversion of an earlier 4 storey warehouse). Rebuilt 1913–1914. Part demolished, one bay remains, and Temperance Lane marks its location.
- Sydney Coffee Palace No. 2, also known as Cripp's, George Street near Circular Quay (1880). Destroyed by fire 1884.
- Sydney Coffee Palace, Woolloomooloo (1880) By 1922 apartments, then Sydney Eye Hospital, now backpackers.
- Grand Central Coffee Palace (1889), Clarence Street, Sydney, licensed and renamed Hotel Arcadia, demolished 1929
- Post Office Palace, from 1916 Ellis's Coffee Palace, 50 King Street, Sydney, (1893). Licensed 1922 as York Hotel, now offices.
- Bee Hive Coffee Palace, Sydney
- Crescent Coffee Palace, Haymarket
- Great Western Coffee Palace, Hay & Sussex Street, Haymarket (1914) Licensed 1916, now offices
- Town Hall Coffee Palace, Brickfield Hill, Sydney
- Oxford Coffee Palace, Riley Street, East Sydney
- Davies Coffee Palace, Manly (1912, demolished 1955)

===== Country NSW =====
- Miss McGuren's Coffee Palace, Coffs Harbour
- Dorrigo Coffee Palace, Hickory St, Dorrigo (burnt down 1926 and again in 1930)
- Metropolitan Coffee Palace, Goulburn (1893)
- Katoomba Coffee Palace, Katoomba
- Central Coffee Palace, Main-street, Murwillumbah
- Palace Hotel, 227 Argent Street, Broken Hill. Built as the Broken Hill Coffee Palace 1889, designed by Alfred Dunn.

==== Queensland ====
- [European Coffee Palace, Albert Street, Brisbane] (Residence of Robert Murry in December 1887)
- People's Palace, Brisbane (built 1910–11, in 2023 still operating as a backpackers' hostel)
- Canberra Hotel, Brisbane (built 1929, sold 1985 and later demolished)
- Royal George, Nambour (built 1911, licensed in 1912 and destroyed by fire on 15 February 1961)
- Hill's Coffee Palace, Dalby

==== Western Australia ====
- Horseshoe Coffee Palace, Perth
- Burnett's Coffee Palace and Temperance Hotel (Perth's first "Coffee Palace", although the building, constructed c1834, was previously the (licensed) Devonshire Arms, prior to that The Mason's Arms), corner Hay and Barrack Streets, diagonally opposite Town Hall, Perth
- Ellis's Grand Central Coffee Palace (still standing as the Grand Central Hotel), Wellington Street, Perth
- Continental Coffee Palace (Wellington Street, Perth
- Rechabite Coffee Palace, Wellington Street, Perth (Opposite Perth railway station)
- Grand Central Coffee Palace, Wellington Street, Perth 1903.
- Royal Coffee Palace, 165-167 Murray Street, Perth
- Musson's (Sydney) Coffee Palace (Hotel), Murray Street, Perth
- Cornwall Coffee Palace (previously the Yankee Coffee Palace), 239 Murray Street (between William and Barrack Streets), Perth
- Prince of Wales Coffee Palace, Murray Street, Perth
- (Shafto's) Victoria Coffee Palace, Wellington St, Perth
- Wilson's Coffee Palace, King Street, Perth
- Paris Coffee Palace, corner of James and Pier Sts, Northbridge
- Worsleys Coffee Palace, Katanning, Perth
- Metropolitan Coffee Palace, Stirling St, Northbridge
- Britannia Coffee Palace, 323 William St, Northbridge
- Perth Coffee Palace, William Street, Northbridge
- Federal Coffee Palace, Fremantle
- 1904 Wise Directory has 20 coffee palaces listed in Perth and other locations in WA

=== United Kingdom ===
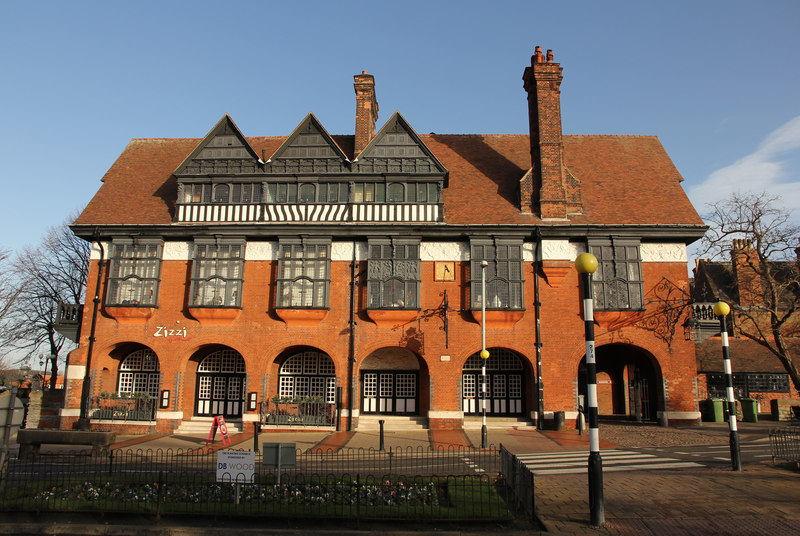
Ossington Coffee Tavern, Newark on Trent, 1882

- Douglas Coffee Palace, Douglas, Isle of Man, c1870 (demolished 1930)
- Dublin Coffee Palace, Townsend Street, Dublin' 1875 (dem)
- Ossington Coffee Tavern, Newark on Trent, 1882
- The Coffee Palace, Townsend Street, Dublin, 1875
- Coffee Palace & Workman's Hall, Kensal Green, London, 1880
- Coffee Tavern, St David's Bridge, Cranbrook, Kent, 1880, (Tiffins Restaurant in 2018)
- Cobden Coffee House, Corporation Street, Birmingham, 1883 (dem)
- Coffee Tavern, Farncombe, Surrey, 1887 (Sweetapple House in 2018).
- Coffee Palace, Upper Tooting Road, London.

== See also ==
- Temperance bar
- Temperance movement

== Bibliography ==
- Grand Hotels: Reality and Illusion. Elaine Denby. Reaktion Books, 2002
