= Dr. Mario (disambiguation) =

Dr. Mario is a 1990 action puzzle video game for the NES, Game Boy, and other Nintendo consoles.

Dr. Mario may also refer to:

- Dr. Mario 64, a 2001 puzzle video game for the Nintendo 64
- Dr. Mario Express, a 2008 DSiWare puzzle video game for the Nintendo DSi
- Dr. Mario Online Rx, a 2008 WiiWare puzzle video game for the Nintendo Wii
- Dr. Mario: Miracle Cure, a 2015 puzzle video game for the Nintendo 3DS
- Dr. Mario World, a 2019 match-three game for mobile devices
