= Palace Hotel, Broken Hill =

Palace Hotel
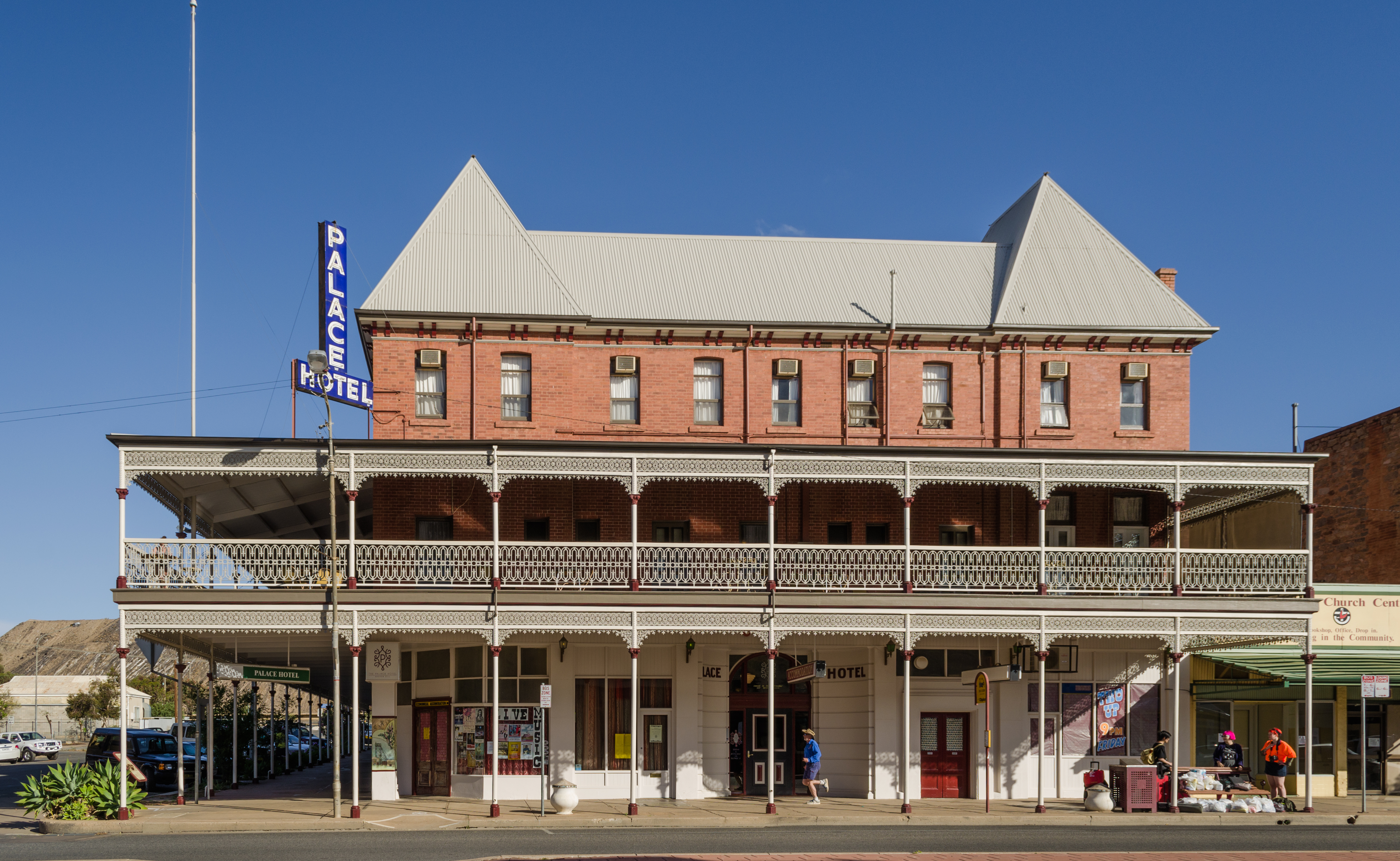

- Location within New South Wales Location within Australia
- 31.9598°S 141.4638°E
- Location: 227 Argent Street, Broken Hill, City of Broken Hill, New South Wales, Australia

History
- Built: 1889

Site notes
- Architectural style: Victorian Filigree

New South Wales Heritage Register
- Official name: Palace Hotel; Mario's Hotel; Marios
- Type: state heritage (built)
- Designated: 2 April 1999
- Reference no.: 335
- Type: Hotel
- Category: Commercial

Palace Hotel, originally built as Broken Hill Coffee Palace, is a heritage-listed pub at 227 Argent Street, Broken Hill, City of Broken Hill, New South Wales, Australia. It has also been known as the Mario's Hotel and Mario's.

The Palace Hotel was in many of the scenes in the 1994 Australian comedy-drama film The Adventures of Priscilla, Queen of the Desert. It was added to the New South Wales State Heritage Register in April 1999, with the entry expanded in January 2025 to reflect its importance to LGBTQIA+ history.

== History ==
The hotel was originally built as a coffee palace by local members of the temperance movement, as the Broken Hill Coffee Palace. It was designed by Melbourne architect Alfred Dunn and built in 1889 at a cost of £12,190, opening on 18 December that year.

The coffee palace was not a financial success, running at a loss for its first three years. In July 1892, media reports indicated the company and lessees were "stone broke". In that month, the lessee applied for and was granted a liquor license, at which time it was renamed the Palace Hotel.

Around 1980, the owner at the time, Mario Celotto, painted a mural of Botticelli's Venus on a ceiling. He later paid Gordon Waye, an Indigenous artist from Port Augusta, to paint all the other mostly landscape themed murals in the hotel, making the hotel a tourist attraction.

The 1994 Australian comedy-drama film, The Adventures of Priscilla, Queen of the Desert, filmed many of its Broken Hill scenes in the Palace Hotel, which producer Al Clark described as "drag queen heaven". The movie describes the hotel's murals as "tack-o-rama".

In 2009, Esther La Rovere bought the hotel. By this time, there were many international tourists visiting the pub because of the film.

== Heritage listing ==
Palace Hotel was listed on the New South Wales State Heritage Register in April 1999. The listing was updated in January 2025, so that it "recognises the vibrant LGBTQIA+ history that has flourished within its walls", after it had become a "symbolic meeting place", and become part of people's coming-out stories.
