= Super Mario Bros. (disambiguation) =

Super Mario Bros. is a 1985 video game by Nintendo for the Nintendo Entertainment System.

Super Mario Bros. may also refer to:

== Video games ==
- Super Mario, a series of video games by Nintendo
  - Super Mario Bros., a 1986 Game & Watch game
  - New Super Mario Bros., a 2006 game for the Nintendo DS
  - Game & Watch: Super Mario Bros., a 2020 Game & Watch system and game compilation

== Films ==
- Super Mario Bros.: The Great Mission to Rescue Princess Peach!, a 1986 Japanese anime film
- Super Mario Bros. (film), a 1993 live-action film
- The Super Mario Bros. Movie, a 2023 animated film

== Other uses ==
- Mario and Luigi, characters collectively known as the Super Mario Bros.
- Super Mario Bros. (comic book)
- Super Mario Bros. theme, a theme originally found in the first stage of Super Mario Bros.
- List of non-video game media featuring Mario

== See also ==
- Mario Bros. (disambiguation)
- Super Mario (disambiguation)
- Super Mario Bros. 2 (disambiguation)
