= Super Mario World (disambiguation) =

Super Mario World is a 1990 platforming video game developed by Nintendo for the Super Nintendo Entertainment System.

Super Mario World may also refer to:

- Super Mario World (TV series), an animated TV series based on the video game
- "Super Mario World", a 2016 song from Logic's Bobby Tarantino mixtape

== See also ==
- Super Mario World 2: Yoshi's Island, a 1995 game for the SNES and the sequel to Super Mario World
- Super Mario 3D World, a 3D platforming video game developed by Nintendo for the Wii U
- Super Nintendo World, an area in some Universal Studios theme parks themed around the Super Mario franchise
- The Super Mario Galaxy Movie, a 2026 movie once listed under the title Super Mario World
