= Mario (song) =

- Vinyl label of 12" Kenyan release

Single by Franco and the TPOK Jazz

from the album Mario
- Language: Lingala
- Released: 1985
- Recorded: 1985
- Studio: Studio Mademba, Libreville
- Genre: Congolese rumba
- Label: Éditions Populaires
- Songwriter: François Luambo Luanzo Makiadi

"Mario" is a song by Congolese rumba musician Franco Luambo and TPOK Jazz, released in 1985 as the title track of his album Mario through his label Éditions Populaires. Written by Franco, the song tells the story of a young, educated man who chooses to live as a gigolo and relies on financial support from an older woman rather than pursuing a career. Using satire and social commentary, Franco critiques a growing trend among Zairean youth through a characteristically frank and provocative portrayal of the title character.

The song was certified gold in Zaire after selling over 200,000 copies, and is regarded as a milestone of Congolese music. French music journalist François Bensignor described it as "arguably Franco's greatest masterpiece, and one of the monuments of 20th-century Congolese music", while the French pan-African weekly Jeune Afrique listed it among the "five songs that made Congo dance".

TPOK Jazz later recorded two sequels, "Mario 2" (1985) and "Mario 3" (1987), the latter appearing on L'Animation Non Stop. The song has been covered by artists including the Afro-salsa group Africando, rapper Marshall Dixon, and Congolese singer Fally Ipupa.

== Background ==
The song emerged during a period of social change in Zaire (now the Democratic Republic of the Congo), during the rule of President Mobutu Sese Seko. Mobutu's regime had recours à l'authenticité (meaning "return to authenticity"), which sought to revive traditional African values. At the same time, Zairean society was also witnessing the rise of a new bourgeois class encouraged conspicuous consumption and changing social norms.

The period also saw an increase in transactional relationships: older men pursuing younger women, and increasingly, older women supporting younger men, often educated but unemployed, as gigolos. These relationships became increasingly visible and socially accepted.

Franco had previously addressed the issue indirectly in his earlier song "Petit poussin", in which a man laments his wife's infatuation with the "little chicks" she supports. As the practice became more common, Franco revisited the theme more directly. This led to the creation of "Mario".

== Recording ==
The song was recorded in 1985 under the direction of Elvis Kemayo at Studio Mademba during a trip of the group TPOK Jazz to Libreville.

== Composition ==
"Mario" is a Congolese rumba song. It was composed in the key of C-flat major, with a moderate tempo of 115 beats per minute. "Mario" has a C, F, G, F chord progression throughout the song.

The song begins with Franco's mi-solo guitar, he is then joined by rhythm guitarist Gégé Mangaya. Drums (played by Nado Kakoma), congas (played by Dessoin Bosuma) and bass (played by Decca Mpudi) also come in when Mangaya's guitar starts up. Franco pronounces the first lines of the song, followed by the chorus, sung by Madilu System. The solo guitar is played by Papa Noël Nedule.

The song's language is raw and direct. Spoken passages alternate with sung ones, giving it a dramatic effect. The narrator's voice combines assertiveness, sarcasm, bitterness, and weariness. Her monologue shifts between scolding, mockery, and lament.

== Lyrical analysis ==
Delivered in a mix of sung verses and spoken interjections, the song is a monologue by a woman confronting her younger, unemployed lover, Mario, who has become financially dependent on her. The lyrics follow a storytelling arc structured around escalating emotional tension. The female narrator expresses her fatigue and anger through arguments, emotional appeals, accusations, and ultimately rejection. The recurring refrain of "Mario, I'm tired/Mario, I've had enough" accentuate her emotional exhaustion and the worsening state of their relationship.

The song's main focus is on economic dependence. Despite having "five diplomas", Mario chooses not to work and instead relies on an older, wealthier woman for support, whom the narrator portrays as opportunistic, lazy, and entitled. The song also reverses traditional gender expectations. It is the woman who holds economic power, while the man occupies a submissive, dependent role. This reversal becomes a source of tension, as Mario seeks control over the narrator and her property, despite having contributed nothing. Although he demands authority ("asks to lead me"), his jealousy, violence, and manipulation deepen the imbalance and reveal his insecurity.

Material possessions such as Mercedes cars, designer clothing, shoes, and furniture symbolize success and the imbalance in the relationship. Mario's attachment to these goods and his desire to be seen as their rightful owner reflects his insecurity and desire for status. His jealousy of the narrator's past and possessions escalates into domestic violence and emotional abuse. At the same time, the woman is also criticized. She is portrayed as having previously benefited from another man's generosity and now uses her resources to sustain the relationship that ultimately harms her household. Franco thus presents a "double-edged" critique, condemning both the man's parasitism and the woman's moral compromises.

Objects and settings carry symbolic meaning: the childhood bed in Mario's family home, now inadequate for his adult frame, becomes a metaphor for his arrested development and refusal to accept adult responsibilities. A Mercedes-Benz accident is used as a symbol of the collapse of materialistic façades and social pretensions. The reference to creams and cosmetics emphasize Mario's vanity and superficiality.

== "La Réponse de Mario" ==
A sequel to the hit "Mario" was recorded in 1987 under the title "La Reponse De Mario" (Mario's response). An answer from the target of the previous song where he gives his version of the story: according to him, it is rather the mature woman who comes to seek him, humiliates him in front of women of his age, forces him to be his lover and interferes in his studies.

== Credits ==
Musicians who participated in the recording of "Mario 1":

- Franco Luambo – songwriter, lead and spoken vocals, mi-solo guitar
- Madilu System – lead vocals
- Papa Noël Nedule – lead guitar
- Gégé Mangaya – rhythm guitarist
- Decca Mpudi – bass guitar
- Nado Kakoma – drums
- Dessoin Bosuma – congas
