= Super Mario Bros. 2 (disambiguation) =

Super Mario Bros. 2 is the 1988 North American sequel to Super Mario Bros. for the Nintendo Entertainment System.

Super Mario Bros. 2 may also refer to:

- Super Mario Bros.: The Lost Levels, the 1986 original, Japan-exclusive sequel to Super Mario Bros. with the same name as the North American sequel; later re-released outside Japan as The Lost Levels in Super Mario All-Stars for the Super Nintendo Entertainment System
- New Super Mario Bros. 2, the 2012 second handheld title in the New Super Mario Bros. series and the third game in the series
- Mario Bros. II, a 1987 Commodore 64 port and sequel of the 1983 LCD Game & Watch game Mario Bros. (which features gameplay unrelated to the platforming Mario Bros. games)

== See also ==
- Super Mario Bros. (disambiguation)
