= Inline (slot car) =

Type of slot car

In the model car hobby, an inline car is a type of slot car or other motorized model car in which the motor shaft runs lengthwise down the chassis, perpendicular to the driven axle (usually the rear). Power is transmitted through a pinion to a crown gear on the axle, or through bevel gears.

The word also refers to the longitudinally-mounted motor or the motor arrangement of such a car.

Of the main motor arrangements for slot cars, the inline is the most common type.

Common Slot Car Motor Arrangements.

Common Slot Car Motor Arrangements.

Schematic diagrams of common chassis layouts. The vertical-shaft Pancake motor is seen end-on, with the shaft pointing toward the reader.

The inline motor has been powering cars since the earliest days of the slot car hobby, when individual craftsmen in the mid-1950s were installing small model railroad motors into converted static models or handbuilt bodies to race on the first club tracks. In 1957, Scalextric, one of the first two commercial lines of modern-style slot cars and track, used inline motors to power its pioneering cars.

== See also ==
- Sidewinder – Transverse-motored slot car
- Anglewinder – Angle-motored slot car
- Pancake – Vertical-motored slot car
- Slot car – Technical information and history of the hobby
- de:Modellauto-Rennsport – German language Wiki slot car page
- Slot car racing – The competitive hobby, organizations, etc.
