= Nintendo Mini =

Nintendo Mini may refer to:

- Nintendo Mini Classics, a video game series by Nintendo
- NES Classic Edition (known as Nintendo Classic Mini in Europe and Australia), a video game console by Nintendo
