= Anglewinder =

Anglewinder is a type of slot car or motorized model car in which the motor shaft runs at an angle to the driven axle (usually the rear) and drives it through a bevel or other angled gear arrangement. It is a development of the sidewinder, or transverse motor, in which the motor shaft is parallel to the driven axle and power is transmitted through spur gears or a belt. The anglewinder arrangement allows use of a slightly longer motor than a pure sidewinder. It also moves the motor's weight forward in the car, which some racers believe improves handling.

In general, the sidewinder and anglewinder are less common arrangements than the inline motor, in which the shaft is perpendicular to the driven axle, and drives it with bevel gears or a pinion and crown gear, and historically at least, less common than the pancake motor, in which the shaft is vertical and power is carried to the axle by a chain of gears through a pinion and crown arrangement.

Common Slot Car Motor Arrangements.

Common Slot Car Motor Arrangements.

The four common chassis layouts for slot cars. The flat, vertical-shaft Pancake motor is seen end-on, with the shaft pointing toward the reader.

== See also ==
- Sidewinder - Transverse-motored slot car
- Inline - Longitudinally-motored slot car
- Pancake - Vertical-motored slot car
- Slot car - Technical information and history of the hobby
- de:Modellauto-Rennsport - German language Wiki slot car page
- Slot car racing - The competitive hobby, organizations, etc.
