= Sidewinder (slot car) =

Sidewinder is a type of slot car or motorized model car characterized by a motor shaft that runs parallel to the driven axle, typically the rear. Power transmission can occur via spur gears, or occasionally through a belt, friction, or direct drive. The term "sidewinder" also describes the transversely mounted motor in such vehicles.

A similar type of slot car that has the motor shaft mounted at an angle to the driven axle is the anglewinder. In general, the sidewinder and anglewinder are less common arrangements than the inline motor, in which the shaft is perpendicular to the driven axle and drives it with bevel gears or a pinion and crown gear. Historically, they are also less common than the pancake motor, in which the shaft is vertical, and power is carried to the axle by a chain of gears to a pinion and crown arrangement. Because they require more space between the drive wheels, the sidewinder and anglewinder arrangements are more common in 1:32, and especially 1:24, than in the smaller scales.

The sidewinder and to an extent the anglewinder configurations are often seen as superior for slot racing cars. This is because when accelerating, the reverse torque of the motor transfers weight to the front of the vehicle, and therefore the guide that keeps it on the track. This allows the slot racer to accelerate through corners. There is also a further advantage as, if dynamic braking is used, the reverse torque of the motor then transfers weight to the rear wheels, which invariably are the dominant grip wheels on a slot car. Conversely the reverse torque effect on inline motor configurations transfers weight from side to side and destabilises the car.

Schematic diagrams of common chassis layouts:

Common slot-car motor arrangements

Not so common slot-car motor arrangements

The flat, vertical-shaft pancake motor is seen end-on, with the shaft pointing toward the reader.

These 1914 Lionel slot cars used a direct-drive sidewinder motor

Use of the sidewinder drive goes back to the first commercially available slot cars. Some of Lionel's original slot car models of 1911–1914 used a type of sidewinder drive. Victory Industries used a sidewinder motor in their 1957 VIP line of 1:32 cars. This brand debuted at the same time as the famous Scalextric line and shares with Scalextric the honor of being the first modern manufactured slot-car system.

== See also ==
- Anglewinder - Angle-motored slot car
- Inline - Longitudinally-motored slot car
- Pancake - Vertical-motored slot car
- Slot car - Technical information and history of the hobby
- Slot car racing - The competitive hobby, organizations, etc.
- Mini 4WD - Sidewinder example
