= Nintendo Classic Mini =

Nintendo Classic Mini can refer to:

- NES Classic Edition, known as the Nintendo Classic Mini: Nintendo Entertainment System in Europe and Australia
- Super NES Classic Edition, known as the Nintendo Classic Mini: Super Nintendo Entertainment System in Europe and Australia

== See also ==
- Nintendo Mini Classics, a series of LCD games released in 1998
