= Pancake (slot car) =

Motor used in slot cars

The pancake motor, as used in slot cars, is a type of electric motor, which has a flat commutator and vertical shaft. It was a feature of the highly successful Aurora HO slot cars of the 1960s and 1970s. The motor was not a separate unit; instead, its individual elements - magnets, armature, commutator and brushes - fit into recesses in the blocky chassis. The power was carried by a chain of spur gears along the top of the chassis, to a pinion which drove a crown gear at the axle. Like most slot car motors, the Aurora pancakes ran on low voltage direct current.

The term 'pancake' is also loosely used to refer to a car or chassis which has such a motor.

Common Slot Car Motor Arrangements.

Common Slot Car Motor Arrangements.

The Pancake motor (far right) is seen end-on, with the shaft pointing toward the reader. The last spur gear has a small pinion gear on its underside, engaging the axle's crown gear.

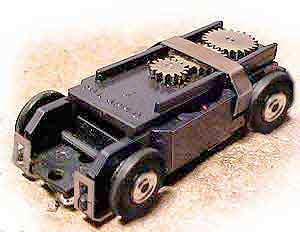
An Aurora "Thunderjet 500" HO chassis and integral pancake motor, 1963-1971.

History

In 1963, Aurora introduced the now-legendary Thunderjet 500 motor, an innovative design by British-American engineer Derek Brand. The Thunderjet was intended as a high-performance, high-reliability replacement for Aurora's successful but finicky vibrator motor. Its two-inch (50 mm) unitized chassis, containing a wide, flat motor-armature, was strikingly different from the conventional inline motors of its HO competitors. It was nicknamed the pancake motor because of the armature's shape.

The Thunderjet could outperform contemporary inlines primarily because the vertical-shaft layout allowed the bulky motor magnets to be mounted to the front and rear, which left the full width of the chassis for the armature and windings. Inline motors require side-mounted magnets, limiting the size of both armature and magnets. The extra torque of the pancake motor's oversized armature more than made up for the friction losses in its complex power train.

Another appeal of the Thunderjet and its amazing Pancake motor is that it can be easily taken apart by simply removing the brass gear plate clip and lifting off the plate. Racers could service the motor, or modify it with numerous factory repair and hop up parts. This gave birth to third party manufacturers building hop up parts and special tools. Racers could change the gear ratio of the car by changing the crown (On the rear axle) gear and the pinion gear. Silver plated electrical parts like armatures, brushes and pickup shoes were an upgrade to improve the conductivity of the motor. Aluminum, brass or plastic wheels were more precision and the car drove smoother, as well as accepting wider soft rubber or silicone racing tires.

The pancake motor and their Thunderjet and A/FX chassis, have frequently been revived by a host of other companies, as recently as 2020, the A/FX Magnatraction chassis with an extra traction magnet, and detailed bodies were reproduced under the name Auto World by Round 2 LLC. (5) Loyal groups of enthusiasts, a surplus of new old stock cars, chassis, original parts, and hop up parts, plus those 3rd party parts still being produced today, social media groups, and online auction sites, have kept these cars and Pancake motors in use continuously from the mid 1960's to present. Some build their own custom track layouts, including city street circuits, or countryside road circuit with scenery, some combined with an electric train layout. Others race in competition at the few remaining commercial HO scale tracks.

The Aurora Thunderjet (or T-jet as it is informally called) was probably the best-selling slot car in history. Faller (Germany) produced it for sale in Europe, and competing companies could not match the speed and reliability of Brand's pancake design. The Thunderjets and their improved versions, the AFX (originally A/FX), sold in the tens of millions, completely dominating the HO market for over a decade, By the early-1970s Tyco's inline motors had become sophisticated enough to challenge Aurora's pancake cars for the HO market. In 1975, Aurora introduced a high-performance inline model, the G-Plus. By 1983, Aurora ceased operation ending the pancake motor era.

Perhaps because armature space was never at a premium in the larger bodies, the pancake-style motor has seldom been seen in 1:32 or 1:24 scale cars, though Aurora did use the design in its short-lived line of 1:48 scale slot cars. Since 2002, the pancake motor is found primarily in the reproductions of the 1960s and '70s Aurora HO chassis marketed by Johnny Lightning, then Auto World.

== See also ==
- Inline - Longitudinally-motored slot car
- Sidewinder - Transverse-motored slot car
- Anglewinder - Angle-motored slot car
- Slot car - Technical information and history of the hobby
- de:Modellauto-Rennsport - German language Wiki slot car page
- Slot car racing - The competitive hobby, organizations, etc.
