= The Legend of Zelda LCD games =

Video games

Several LCD games based on the video game series The Legend of Zelda have been released. The first, Zelda (Game & Watch), released in 1989, was developed and manufactured by Nintendo; later LCD games were licensed to other developers. The Legend of Zelda game watch (1989) is a wristwatch game produced by Nelsonic Industries as part of their Nelsonic Game Watch series. Zelda no Densetsu: Kamigami no Triforce (Note: Japanese: ゼルダの伝説 神々のトライフォース) is a fighting game produced by Epoch Co. for the Barcode Battler II, (Note: Japanese: バーコードバトラーII) and was released only in Japan.

== Game & Watch: Zelda ==
Zelda
- Cover of the Zelda Game & Watch
- Developer: Nintendo Research & Development 1
- Publisher: Nintendo
- Platforms: Game & Watch, Nintendo Mini Classics
- Release: Game & Watch: NA: August 1989; Mini Classics: NA: 1998
- Genre: Action-adventure
- Mode: Single-player

The Zelda Game & Watch (model number ZL-65) is a multi-screen Game & Watch system developed by Nintendo and released in North America in 1989. Its gameplay was heavily inspired by Nintendo Entertainment System game Zelda II: Adventure of Link, and it featured an original story described in the manual.

Unlike the other LCD games, this was made by Nintendo and appeared on a Nintendo platform. The handheld console would be Nintendo's penultimate release before the release of the Game Boy (the last being Mario the Juggler).

=== Gameplay ===
Players control Link and fight through labyrinth chambers on the Game & Watch's lower screen. In the labyrinth chambers, Link faces Poe-like Ghosts, up to four Stalfos, and a Moblin-like Goblin mini-boss. Stalfoses and Ghosts cannot be defeated and must be dodged and blocked with the shield respectively. The Goblin must be killed in order to complete the lower-screen labyrinth. Once the Labyrinth is complete, stairs appear and the action shifts to the Dragon's Lair in the upper screen. Here Link battles a dragon on the right hand side of the screen while avoiding its fire and tail attacks. The left hand side of the screen displays the dungeon map and items such as the Tomahawk item—unique to this game—that Link gains while fighting the dragon. Upon defeating the dragon, the game starts again with quicker enemies and retaining the player's high score. This Game & Watch game also features a continue button that allows players to continue the game in the event of the player's death.

=== Plot ===
Eight unruly dragons are creating havoc in the world. After they kidnap Princess Zelda, it is up to Link to defeat them and rescue the princess. The dragons have imprisoned Zelda behind a seal that requires all 8 pieces of the Triforce to unlock. After defeating each dragon, Link gains one piece of the triforce.

=== Development and release ===
The Zelda Game & Watch was developed by Gunpei Yokoi and Nintendo R&D1.

=== Reception ===
Zelda is thought to have pushed the limits of what is possible on the Game & Watch LCD format, though the gameplay is far simpler than the NES original. The game was noted in particular by Famitsu as having achieved the excitement and role-playing game-feel of the original series, but the game was criticized for being too easy if the player attained too many power-ups during play. Retro Gamer rated it Number 5 in their "Perfect Ten Games" for Game & Watch, noting that "it did capture the feel of the world it was played in".

=== Ports and re-releases ===
In 1998, Toymax Inc. was licensed to make the Mini Classics series, keychain-sized remakes of the Game & Watch series, one of them being Zelda. It has a significantly smaller screen size. This keychain version, along with Oil Panic and Donkey Kong, was only released in Europe. By early 2007, Stadlbauer and It's Outrageous! began distributing the Mini Classics version in select locations within the United States, using art from A Link to the Past and Four Swords Adventures.

In October 2002, Nintendo included a port of the game as a hidden unlockable extra in Game & Watch Gallery 4 for the Game Boy Advance. Due to limitations of the GBA hardware, the visuals were changed. To fit everything on-screen at once, the screen where the action is not taking place is reduced to about two-thirds of that of the original height.

== The Legend of Zelda (Game Watch) ==
The Legend of Zelda
- The Legend of Zelda game watch box
- Developer: Nelsonic Industries
- Publisher: Nelsonic Industries
- Platform: Nelsonic game watch
- Release: NA: October 5, 1989; PAL: May 1992
- Genre: Action-adventure
- Mode: Single-player

The Legend of Zelda game watch is a multi-purpose wristwatch released by Nelsonic Industries in 1989 (re-released for European markets by Zeon in 1992) as part of their Game Watch line. It tells the time and allows players to play a game. It runs on one battery, size #364 (black watch) or #392 (red watch). The game is based on the NES's original The Legend of Zelda, and was manufactured in black, red, white and pink colors.

=== Gameplay ===
The player controls Link as he defeats enemies in caves to retrieve pieces of the Triforce. The game consists of four levels with four cavernous rooms each. In each cave, Link has to collect a boomerang and sword to defeat several enemies. Defeating all of the enemies in the cave grants Link a key to the next room which, on entering, causes Link to lose all of his weapons so that he can collect them again in the new cave. Once all enemies in the fourth cave are killed, the Dragon—the level's boss—appears. After Link defeats the Dragon, a Triforce fragment appears, giving him access to the next level. After collecting all four pieces of the Triforce, the game ends.

=== Plot ===
Plot details for the game are scant to nonexistent. According to the manual, Link enters a cave where he is immediately attacked by Iron Balls, Ferocious bats, and fire breathing Dragons. After obtaining weapons to defeat the enemies presented in each of the 4 caves per level, Link finds a key and fights the fire-breathing Dragon that serves as the boss of the level. When the Dragon is defeated he leaves Link with a piece of the Triforce. After progressing through all 4 levels, Link collects all 4 pieces of Triforce and wins.

=== Reception ===
The game was well received by critics for its stylishness as an article of clothing, but the game was considered to have been largely unsuccessful in evoking the original NES title. While the game was praised for its ability to give the illusion of multiple screens, the gameplay was criticized for its simplicity and the game as a whole was found to be "unrelated to its namesake" and generally "very poor". Positive aspects touched on by reviewers included the game's relatively low price and its portability.

== Zelda no Densetsu: Kamigami no Triforce (Barcode Battler II) ==
Zelda no Densetsu: Kamigami no Triforce
- Cover art for Zelda no Densetsu: Kamigami no Triforce (Barcode Battler II)
- Developer: Epoch Co.
- Publisher: Epoch Co.
- Platform: Barcode Battler II
- Release: JP: 1992
- Genre: Fighting
- Mode: Single-player

In 1992, Epoch Co. was licensed to print a series of Nintendo-themed cards for their Barcode Battler II platform. Card sets were printed with both Mario and Zelda themes. Functioning similarly to an LCD e-Reader, the Barcode Battler II requires players to swipe barcodes printed on cards across a visual input in order to enter characters, enemies, items, and spells into the console. The Zelda no Densetsu: Kamigami no Triforce set features 30 software-only cards, (Note: Japanese: 専用カードソフト) and is based on the SNES's original The Legend of Zelda: A Link to the Past.

=== Gameplay ===
Played in the C2 mode on Barcode Battler II, Zelda no Densetsu: Kamigami no Triforce set allows the player to play as either Warrior or Wizard. After choosing the hero card (either "Link" or "Link(Magic)"), the player scans it into the Barcode Battler II where its stats are recorded and displayed on the LCD screen. For each battle, the players choose an enemy and swipe it in to fight against the hero. The battle is conducted based on an algorithm within the Barcode Battler, and the results of the fight are displayed in new character stats on the LCD screen. If the enemy is defeated, the enemy card is discarded and the next enemy card is swiped in. At any point between fights, the player may choose to swipe in and discard one of the ten item cards. Item cards provide a variety of benefits to the hero including boosting weapon stats, restoring life, and increasing defensive stats. Discarded item cards may be returned to the player from the discard pile upon defeating a Wizard enemy. After all other enemies are defeated, the player must swipe the "Ganon" card to fight the final boss. If Ganon is defeated, the player has won.

=== Plot ===
Ganon has transformed the sacred land into the "World of Darkness" and is now plotting to take over the "World of Light" (i.e. Hyrule). To achieve this end, the evil priest Agahnim strives to sacrifice the daughters of the seven sages to break the seal holding Ganon in check.

Link must venture through the Worlds of Light and Darkness to defeat Ganon. Along the way numerous puzzles and monsters await.

=== Reception ===
Both the Zelda no Densetsu card set and the Mario card set were released as Nintendo-licensed special-edition cards for the Barcode Battler II. The system itself was popular in Japan, inspiring the creation of a comic book series as well as the commission of products for Falcom and NTV.

== Game & Watch: The Legend of Zelda ==
Game & Watch: The Legend of Zelda
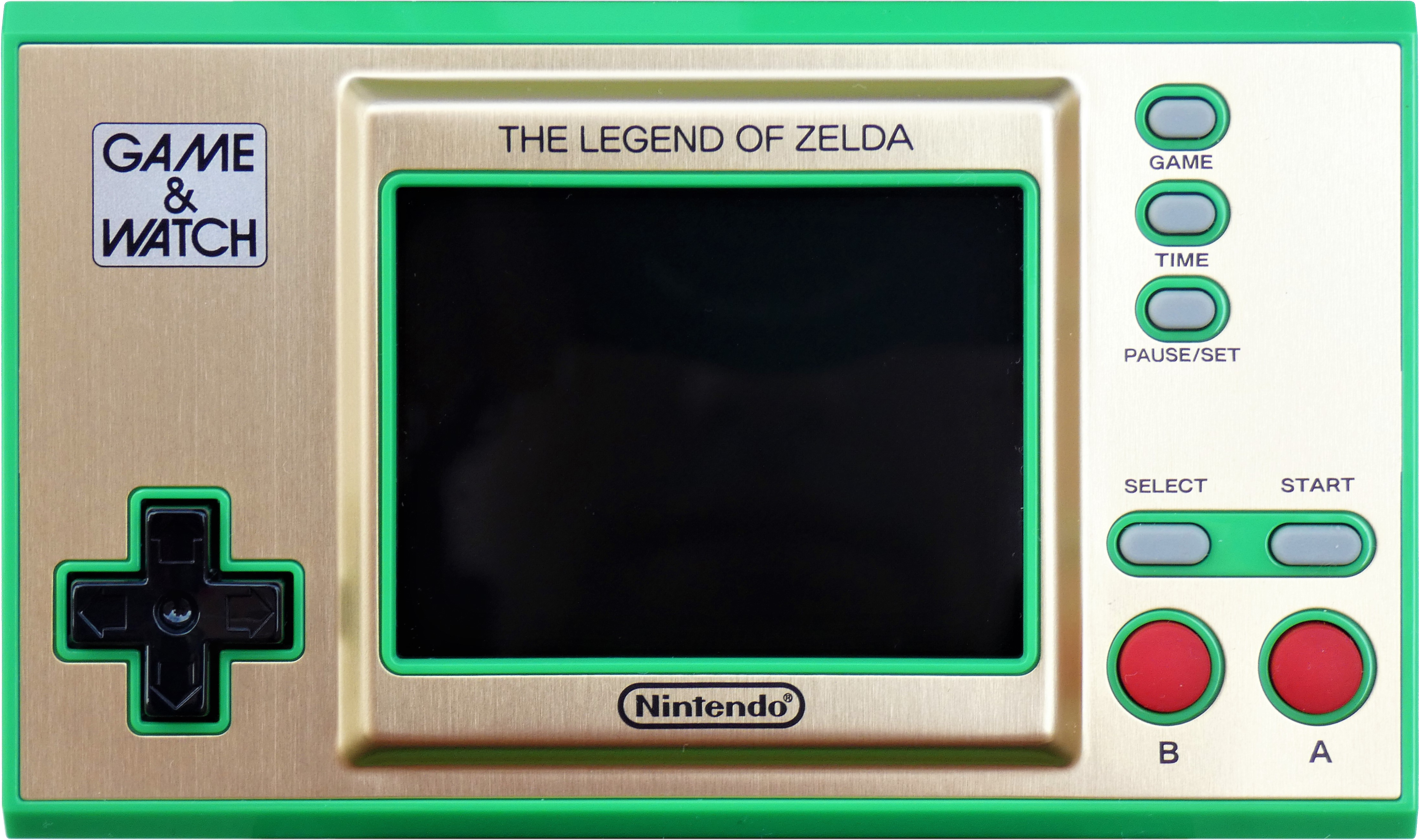
- Developer: Nintendo
- Publisher: Nintendo
- Composers: Koji Kondo; Akito Nakatsuka; Kazumi Totaka; Minako Hamano; Kozue Ishikawa
- Series: The Legend of Zelda
- Platform: Game & Watch
- Release: WW: November 12, 2021
- Genre: Action-adventure
- Mode: Single-player

Nintendo released the limited edition Game & Watch: The Legend of Zelda unit in 2021 as part of their celebrations of the franchise's 35th anniversary. This unit features a full-color pixel screen unlike prior Game & Watch systems. It comes with four games, including fully playable NES/Famicom versions of both the Japanese and international variants of The Legend of Zelda and Zelda II: The Adventure of Link, the Game Boy version of Link's Awakening in various languages, and a new Zelda-themed variant of Vermin in which the original character's head has been replaced with that of Link. It is unrelated to Game & Watch: Zelda, and contains none of that game's content.

The size and shape of the external hardware is similar to the original Game & Watch Wide Screen series, but with the addition of a cross-shaped D-pad like the one featured in the Game & Watch: Zelda. This unit was released on November 12, 2021. The Game & Watch has a similar concept to the Game & Watch: Super Mario Bros., but it instead has four games and unlike the Mario one, it has a timer in addition to the clock feature, a hidden game difficulty for the Game and Watch Game, and it bears an emblem on the back of the handheld in the shape of the Triforce, which lights up when powered on.

The game is powered by a STM32H7B0VBT6 microcontroller, which includes an ARM Cortex-M7 core.
