= Nintendo Mini Classics =

Series of LCD games licensed by Nintendo

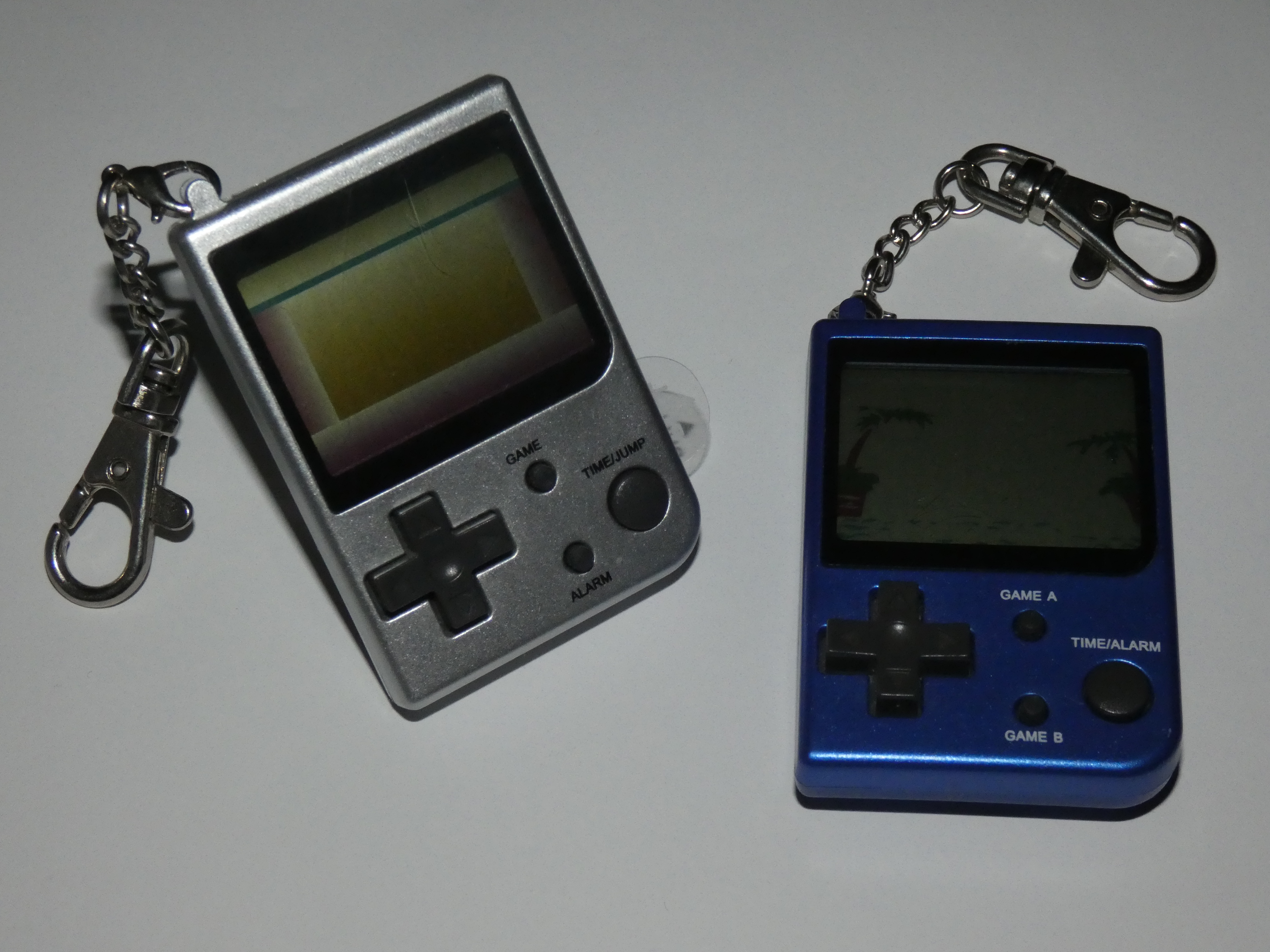
Super Mario Bros. and Parachute models

Nintendo Mini Classics are a series of small LCD games licensed by Nintendo in 1998. Most games in the series are reissues of Game & Watch titles, but the series does include titles that were not from the original Game & Watch line, like Spider-Man, Carrera and Yu-Gi-Oh!.

== Design ==
Each Mini Classics unit is designed to resemble a miniaturized Game Boy. Units typically have a D-pad and three buttons. A large action button is also used for setting the alarm, and two smaller buttons typically marked "Game A" and "Game B" but could also serve different functions depending on the game. A keychain comes attached to the top left-hand corner but can be removed. Most units also have a stand on the back. Some games, however, do not have a stand, particularly the Dual-screen releases such as Oil Panic and Donkey Kong. Similar to the Game and Watch, the Nintendo Mini Classics units have alarm clock features. Each unit is powered by two 11.6x4.2 mm button cell batteries (AG13/LR44/L1154/386/301/186), which are packaged with the Nintendo Mini Classic.

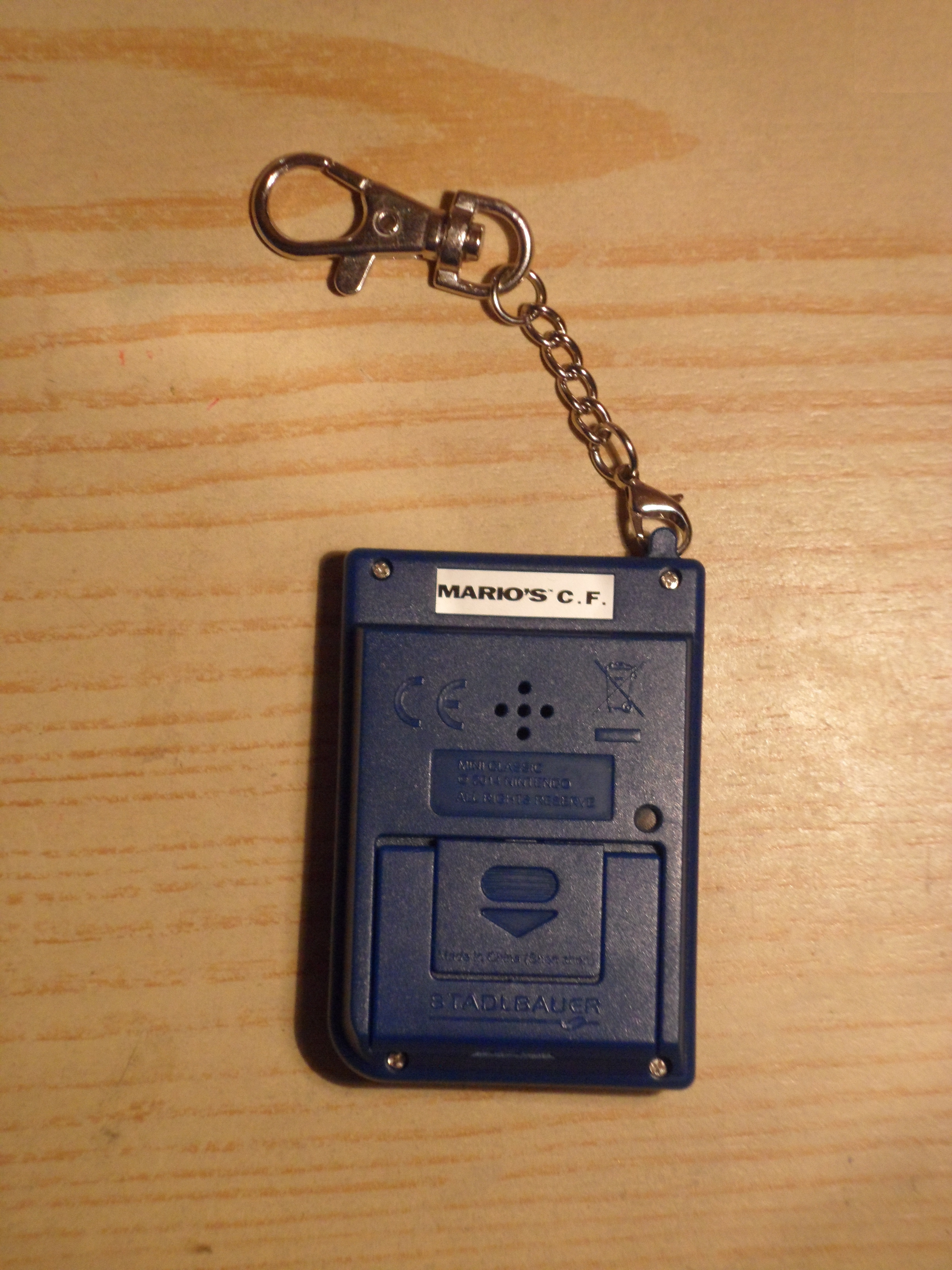
The back of a Mario's Cement Factory Mini Classics system

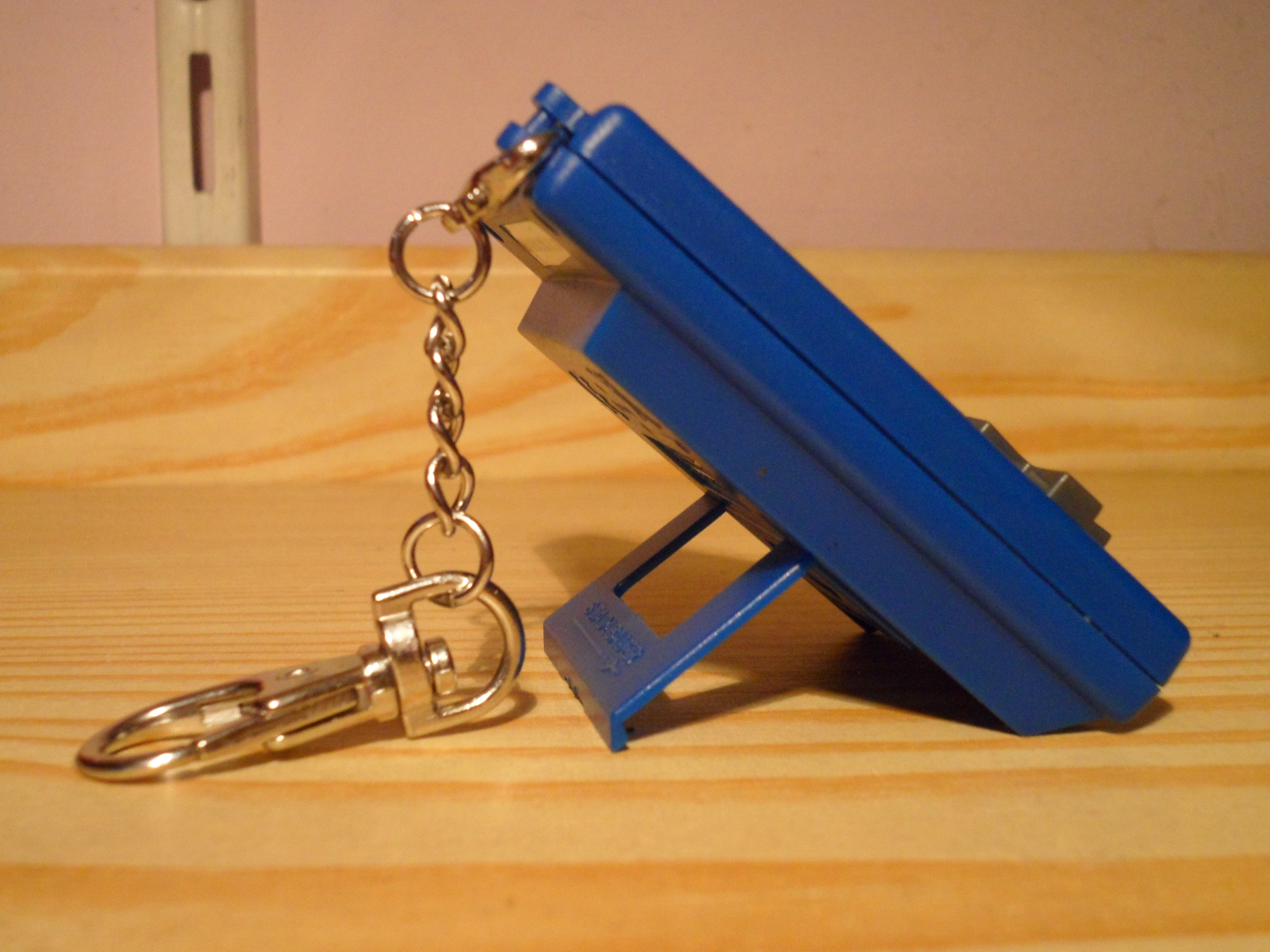
The stand on the back of a Nintendo Mini Classics system

== Games ==
=== Game & Watch reissues ===
- Donkey Kong (Dual-Screen)
- Donkey Kong Jr.
- Fire
- Mario's Cement Factory
- Octopus
- Oil Panic (Dual-Screen) (Europe exclusive)
- Parachute
- Snoopy Tennis
- Super Mario Bros.
- Zelda (Dual-Screen)

=== Original titles ===
- Carrera (a racing game branded by the slot car manufacturer Carrera)
- Harry Potter and the Goblet of Fire (Europe exclusive)
- The Smurfs (Europe exclusive)
- Soccer
- Spider-Man
- Star Trek: Beam Me Up! (Europe exclusive)
- Star Trek: The Next Generation (Dual Screen) (Europe exclusive)
- Sudoku (Europe exclusive)
- Tetris (Europe exclusive)
- UEFA Euro 2008 (Europe exclusive)
- Yu-Gi-Oh!

== Colors ==
Some of the Mini Classics models, particularly the often-reissued Mario and Donkey Kong titles, have undergone several different color changes since the original 1998 releases, mostly due to multiple companies working with Nintendo to make and distribute the titles. Some titles have also been given new color-tinted LCD displays since then. The companies that help distribute them are also responsible for the programming for their versions of the titles, which is why some might sound and behave differently.

=== Octopus ===
- Toymax: light blue case (1999)
- Stadlbauer: Translucent blue case (1998, 2014)

=== Fire ===
- Toymax: Red case (1999)
- Stadlbauer: Translucent red case (2014)

=== Donkey Kong ===
- Take 2: Cyan case (2007)

=== Donkey Kong Jr. ===
- Toymax: dark green case (1998)
- MGA: yellow-green case (2000)
- It's Outrageous: yellow case with color LCD (2007)
- Stadlbauer: yellow-orange case (2014)

=== Mario's Cement Factory ===
- Stadlbauer: Translucent Yellow Case with Grey D-Pad (1998) and Blue Case (1998)
- Vivid Imaginations: yellow case (1998)
- Toymax: yellow case (1999)
- MGA: grey case/dark blue case with white D-pad (2000)
- Take 2: transparent yellow case (2002)
- It's Outrageous: dark blue case (2007)
- Marks and Spencer: silver case (2007)
- Stadlbauer: blue case (2014)

=== Super Mario Bros. ===
- Stadlbauer: silver case/blue case/smaller pack with green case (1998)
- Toymax: silver case (1998)
- MGA: blue case (2000)
- It's Outrageous: green case with color LCD (2007)
- Stadlbauer: silver case (2014)

=== The Smurfs ===
- Take 2: transparent blue-green case (2001)

=== Snoopy Tennis ===
- Stadlbauer: white case (2014)

== Distributors ==
- Stadlbauer, maker of the Nintendo Mini Classics, principal distributor of the titles in Europe, exclusive distributor in former Eastern Bloc.
- Zappies Ltd, exclusive distributor of the Mini Classics in United Kingdom.
- Take-Two Interactive, distributor of the Mini Classics in parts of Europe. The only known distributor of Oil Panic and the games based on Star Trek: The Next Generation.
- Toymax, first American distributor of the Mini Classics. The first wave released in 1998 consisted of Super Mario Bros., Donkey Kong Jr., Fire, and Parachute. Octopus and Mario's Cement Factory were issued shortly thereafter in 1999. The packaging and an insert included for the last two games indicate that Snoopy Tennis apparently was also released in that time, but a Toymax-branded version of the game has yet to be discovered.
- MGA Entertainment: after the Toymax releases, MGA reissued Super Mario Bros., Donkey Kong Jr., and Mario's Cement Factory in the USA beginning in 2000.
- It's Outrageous, the third distributor of the Mini Classics in the United States. The company reissued Super Mario Bros., Donkey Kong Jr., and Mario's Cement Factory again, and introduced several of the newer Mini Classics to America, including Donkey Kong, Zelda, Soccer, Spider-Man, and Carrera.
- Carrera, current distributor of the Mini Classics in the United States since 2014.
- Playtronic, former distributor of Mini Classics in Brazil.
- Candide, current distributor of the Mini Classics in Brazil. 5 titles were released, all of them are the It's Outrageous versions. The games are Super Mario Bros., Donkey Kong Jr., Soccer, Mario's Cement Factory, and Carrera.
- Lukas Toys, exclusive distributor in Poland.
- Beosoft, exclusive distributor in Federal Republic of Yugoslavia.

== Sales ==
More than 10 million Nintendo Mini Classics were sold by Stadlbauer.

== Notes ==
- The US version of Carrera has both Stadlbauer and It's Outrageous branding. Both companies' logos are on the packaging, and Stadlbauer's is on the unit itself. This is presumably because Carrera was originally designed for the European market (where Stadlbauer, not It's Outrageous, is the main distributor), where 1/32 slot cars (the Carrera company's main product) are much more popular than they are in the United States.

== See also ==
- Game & Watch
- Game & Watch Gallery
