= Slot.it Challenge =

Slot.it Challenge is a UK slot racing championship sponsored by Slot.it and Pendle Slot Racing. It has been held since 2006 between April and November.

== Format ==
The format of the championship has not changed since its inception. With the race always held on a Sunday, that Saturday is used as timed practice for visiting drivers, with home drivers not allowed to practice that day. The hosting venue also holds a meal at the most popular and closest hotel to the track on the Saturday evening after practice. During the race, every contestant drives a three-minute stint in every lane. These laps are then totaled to give an overall position, and these positions are used to determine what lane a driver will be in for the step-up finals. The winning driver after the step-ups is awarded fifty points, with the second driver taking forty-nine points, etc. The scoring regime was the same for juniors until the end of the 2008 season; thereafter, juniors' winning points were reduced to twenty, with the second junior taking nineteen points, and so on.

At the end of the season, if a driver has completed all events, his worst round will be erased. A driver competing in all but one event keeps all his points.

== Venues ==
The starting venue since 2007, Pinewood only held one event on its "old" track its first year. The track got a new 105' gloss surface track in 2008. Pinewood's main features are a very short start, a high-speed banked 180 degree corner, and a challenging section at the top of the track. In 2007, the winning pace was 24.4 laps within the three minutes. However, by 2010, the winning pace was up to 28.7 laps within the three minutes, giving an average lap time increase of 1.1 seconds per 3 minutes.

== 2006 ==
Seniors top three

Position	Name	North Staffs	Hamilton	Preston	Pendle	Wolverhampton	Total
1	Neil Hirst		45	50	50	50	195
2	Ross McKie	45	50	48	49		192
3	Jim Brown	43		46	48	49	186

Juniors top three

Position	Name	North Staffs	Hamilton	Preston	Pendle	Wolverhampton	Total
1	Nathanial Rigg	49	50	49		50	198
2	Luke Brandwood	50		50	49	49	198
3	Steven Osbourne	48	48	48	50		194
