= Slot car =

Slot-guided powered model car

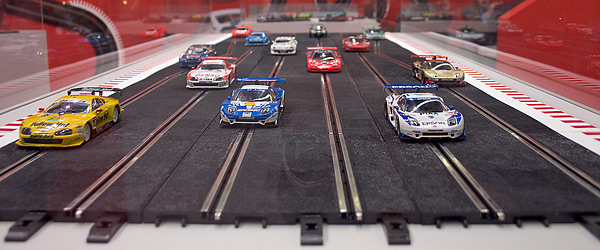
Modern commercially made slot cars and track. Ninco, 1:32 scale

A slot car or slotcar is a powered miniature automobile or other vehicle that is guided by a groove or slot in the track on which it runs. A pin or blade extends from the bottom of the car into the slot. Though some slot cars are used to model highway traffic on scenic layouts, the great majority are used in the competitive hobby of slot car racing (or slot racing).

== Description ==
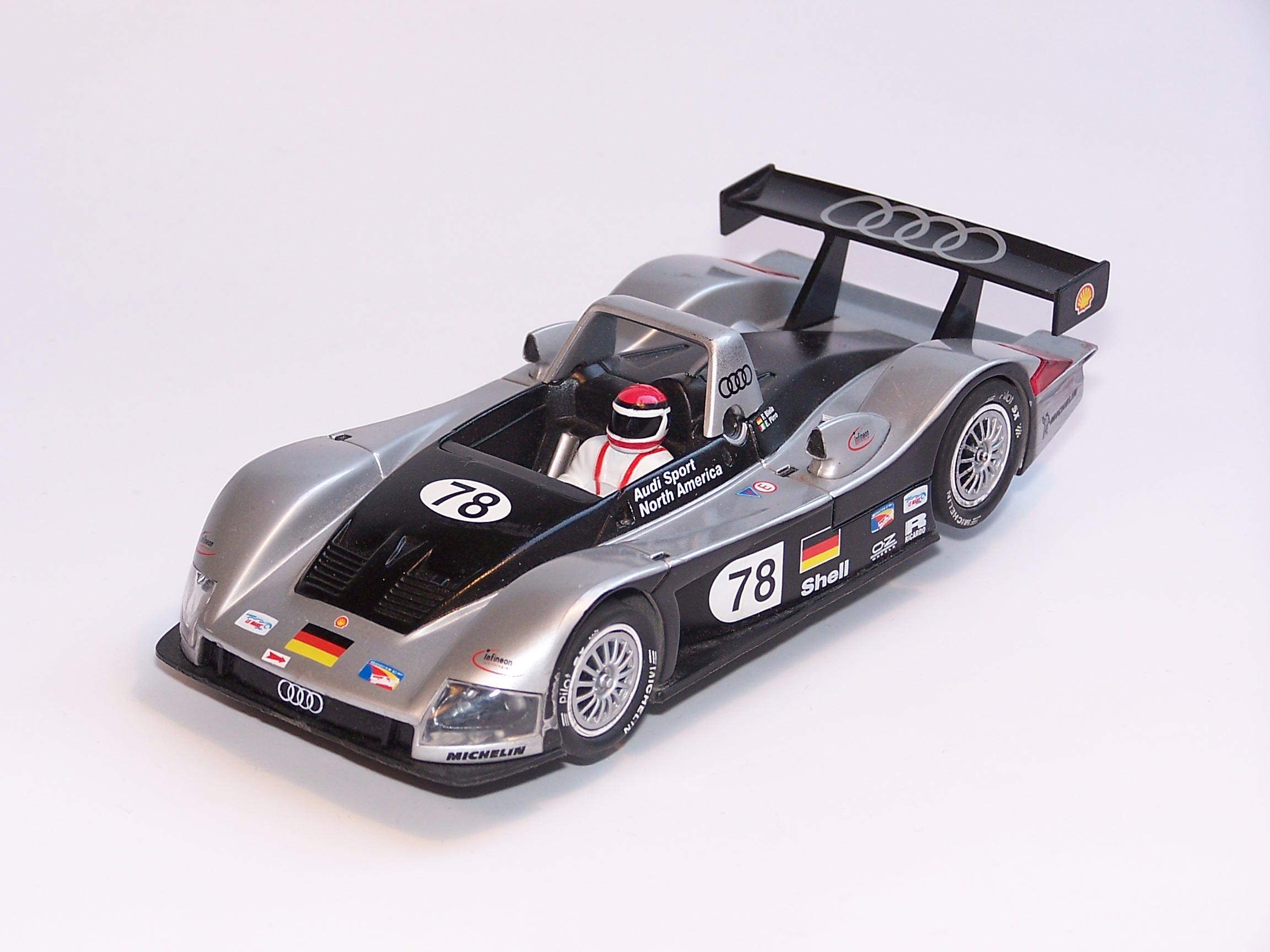
A typical, 1:32 scale, Audi R8R slot car by Carrera

Slot cars are usually models of actual automobiles, though some have bodies purpose-designed for miniature racing. Most enthusiasts use commercially available slot cars (often modified for better performance), others motorize static models, and some "scratch-build", creating their own mechanisms and bodies from basic parts and materials.

Drivers generally use a hand-held controller to regulate a low-voltage electric motor hidden within the car. Traditionally, each car runs on a separate lane with its own guide-slot (though recently developed digital technology can allow cars to share and change lanes). The challenge in racing slot cars comes in taking curves and other obstacles as fast as possible without causing the car to lose its grip and spin sideways, or to 'deslot', leaving the track altogether.

Some enthusiasts, much as in model railroading, build elaborate tracks, sculpted to have the appearance of a real-life racecourse, including miniature buildings, trees, and people. Hobbyists whose main goal is competition often prefer a track unobstructed by scenery. Model motorcycles, trucks and other vehicles that use the guide-slot system are also generally included under the loose classification of "slot car."

== Operation ==
Typical electrical circuit of a 1:24 or 1:32 slot car track

The diagram on the right shows the wiring of a typical 1:24 or 1:32 slot car setup. Power for the car's motor is carried by metal strips next to the slot, and is picked up by contacts alongside the guide flag (a swiveling blade) under the front of the slot car. The voltage is varied by a resistor in the hand controller. This is a basic circuit, and optional features such as braking elements or electronic control devices are not shown. Likewise, the car's frame or chassis has been omitted for clarity.

HO slot cars work on a similar principle, but the current is carried by thin metal rails that project barely above the track surface and are set farther out from the slot. The car's electrical contacts, called "pickup shoes", are generally fixed directly to the chassis, and a round guide pin is often used instead of a swiveling flag.

Today, in all scales, traction magnets are sometimes used to provide downforce to help hold the car to the track at higher speeds, though some enthusiasts believe magnet-free racing provides greater challenge and enjoyment and allows the back of the car to slide or "drift" outward for visual realism.

== Scale ==
Models of the Ford GT, in 1:24, 1:32 and nominal HO scales are shown. The 1960s-era HO model has been widened to accept the mechanism.

There are three common slotcar scales (sizes): 1:24 scale, 1:32 scale, and so-called HO size (1:87 to 1:64 scale). They are also commonly written as 1/24, 1/32, 1/87 and 1/64. Usual pronunciation is "one twenty-fourth", "one thirty-second", and so on, but sometimes "one to twenty-four", "one to thirty-two".

- 1:24 scale cars are built so that one unit of length (such as an inch or millimetre) on the model equals 24 units on the actual car. Thus, a model of a Jaguar XK-E (185 inches or 4.7 m overall length) would be 7.7 inches (20 cm) long in 1:24 scale. 1:24 cars require a course so large as to be impractical for many home enthusiasts, so most serious 1:24 racing is done at commercial or club tracks.
- 1:32 scale cars are smaller and more suited to home-sized race courses, but they are also widely raced on commercial tracks, in hobby shops or in clubs. This scale is the most popular in Europe, and is equivalent to the old #1 gauge (or "standard size") of toy trains. A Jaguar XK-E would be about 5.8 inches (15 cm) in 1:32 scale.
- HO-sized cars vary in scale. Because they were marketed as model railroad accessories, the original small slot cars of the early 1960s very roughly approximated either American and European HO scale (1:87) or British OO scale (1:76). As racing in this size evolved, the cars were enlarged to take more powerful motors, and today they are often 1:64 or larger in scale; but they still run on track of approximately the same width, and are generically referred to as HO slot cars. They are usually not accurate scale models, since the proportions of the tiny bodies must often be stretched to accommodate a standard motor and mechanism. The E-Jaguar scales out to 2.1 inches (5.3 cm) long in 1:87 and 2.9 inches (7.4 cm) in 1:64). Although there is HO racing on commercial and shop-tracks, probably most HO racing occurs on home racetracks.

In addition to the major scales, slot cars have been commercially produced in 1:48 scale and 1:43 scale, corresponding to O gauge model trains. 1:48 cars were promoted briefly in the 1960s, and 1:43 slot car sets are generally marketed today (2007) as children's toys. So far, there is little organized competition in 1:43, but the scale is gaining some acceptance among adult hobbyists for its affordability and moderate space requirements. The E-Jaguar is 4.3 inches (11 cm) long in 1:43.

== History ==
The earliest known commercial slotcars (Lionel Corp., 1912) which appeared on the cover of the 1913 and 1914 Lionel catalogs

The first commercial slot cars were made by Lionel and appeared in their catalogs from 1912, drawing power from a toy train rail sunk in a trough or wide slot between the rails. They were surprisingly similar to modern slot cars, but independent speed control was available only as an optional extra. Production was discontinued after 1915. Sporadically over the next forty years, several other electrically powered commercial products came and went. Although a patent was registered as far back as March 1936 for a slot car, until the late 1950s, nearly all powered toy vehicles were guided by raised rails, either at the wheels (railroad-style), or at the lane center, or edge.

By the late 1930s, serious craftsmen/hobbyists were racing relatively large (1:16 to 1:18 scale) model cars, powered by small internal combustion engines, originally with spark-ignition, later with glow plug engines. For guidance, the cars were clamped to a single center rail, or tethered from the center of a circular track, then they were started and let go for timed runs. There was no driver control of either the speed or steering, so "gas car" racing was largely a mechanic's hobby. In the 1940s hobbyists in Britain began to experiment with controllable electric cars using handbuilt motors, and in the 1950s using the small model train motors that had become available. In 1954, the Southport Model Engineering Society in the UK was challenged by a patent-holder for using rail-guided gas-car exhibitions to raise funds, so, as a replacement, the members constructed an electric racecourse, a groundbreaking six-lane layout nearly 60 feet long, for 1:32 rail-guided cars, which is widely considered to be the progenitor of electric rail- and slot-racing. In 1955–1956, several clubs in the UK and US, inspired by the Southport layout, were also racing electric cars guided by center rails, and soon after, by slots in the track surface. The term "slot car" was coined to differentiate these from the earlier "rail cars". As the member-built club layouts proliferated, the relative advantages of rail and slot were debated for several years, but the obtrusive appearance of the rails and their blocking of the car's rear wheels when sliding through corners were powerful disadvantages. New clubs increasingly chose the slot system. By 1963, even the pioneer rail-racing clubs had begun to switch to slots.

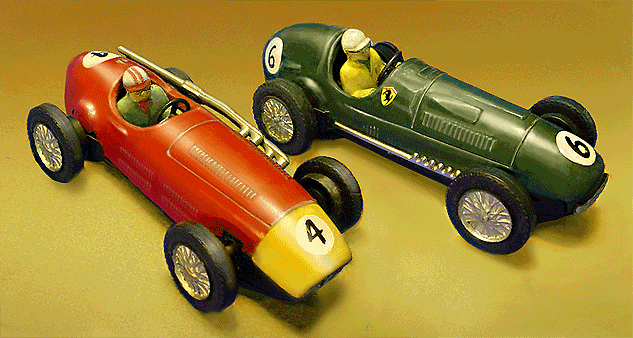
Here are very early Scalextric slot car models in 1:30 scale, circa 1957. These metal-bodied racers were electrified versions of Scalex clockwork cars, and are among the first commercially offered slot cars of the modern era. They represent the Maserati 250F (left) and the Ferrari 375 Grand Prix cars.

In 1957, Minimodels converted its Scalex 1:30 (later, 1:32) clockwork racers to electricity, creating the famous Scalextric line of slot-guided models, and Victory Industries introduced the VIP line, both companies eventually using the new plastic-molding technologies to provide controllable slot racers with authentic bodies in 1:32 scale for the mass market. Both lines included versatile sectional track for the home racer - or the home motorist; VIP produced sports cars and accessories slanted toward a "model roadways" theme, while Scalextric more successfully focused on Grand Prix racing.

As Scalextric became an instant hit, American hobbyists and manufacturers were adapting 1:24 car models to slots, and British-American engineer Derek Brand developed a tiny vibrator motor small enough to power model cars roughly in scale with HO and OO electric trains. In 1959, Playcraft division of Mettoy produced these in the UK, and a year later, Aurora Plastics Corp. released HO vibrator sets with huge success in the US. The tiny cars fascinated the public, and their cost and space requirements were better suited to the average consumer than the larger scales. In only a year or two, Scalextric's 1:32 cars and Aurora's "Model Motoring" HO line had set off the "slot car craze" of the 1960s.

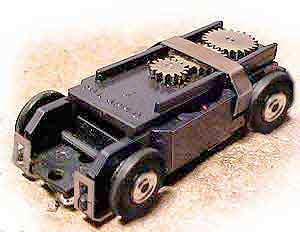
An Aurora "Thunderjet-500" HO chassis and motor, 1963–1971

The slot car craze was largely a U.S. phenomenon, but, commercially, it was a huge one. In 1963, after a million and a half had been produced, Aurora replaced the trouble-prone vibrator cars with an innovative flat-commutator ("pancake") motor, also created by Brand, and what is probably the best-selling slot car in history, the Aurora Thunderjet-500 was born. Faller produced it for sale in Europe, and competing companies tried in vain to match the speed and reliability of Brand's design. The Thunderjets and their improved versions, the AFX, sold in the tens of millions, completely dominating the HO market for almost a decade, until challenged by Tyco cars in the early 1970s.

By the late 1970s the slot car boom was well over, the model train tie-ins and miniature motoring concepts largely forgotten, and the market returned to the more serious racing hobbyist, with local and national racing organizations evolving to set standards and rules for different classes of competition. Technological innovation brought much higher speeds in all scales, with faster motors, better tires, and traction magnets to hold the cars down in curves, though some of the 1960s enthusiasts thought that slot racing had become too specialized for the casual hobbyist, and fondly remembered the more primitive cars of their youth as not as fast, but more fun.

In the 1990s, computer design and methods of printing on 3-D objects helped create much more detailed and authentic models than the simple shapes and rudimentary graphics of the slot car boom. In addition, newly manufactured replicas of Aurora's HO slot cars of the 1960s and 1970s appeared on the market and consumers gained the option of racing either the modern high-tech wonder cars or the more basic designs of an earlier time. In 2004, the Digital Command Control (DCC) systems, which had revolutionized model railroading in the 1990s, began to appear in 1:32 slot cars, offering the ability to race multiple cars per lane with more realistic passing.

In 2012, Hong Kong Chinese inventor Mak Wing Kwong introduced the "Dynamic Motion Express" slot car system. The DMX track has a series of parallel slots, allowing drivers to choose lanes on the inside, middle, or outside of the raceway, passing or blocking other racers. DMXslot cars have a rotating mechanism underneath each car with four pins that retract and protrude as the driver commands the car to move left or right. The car disengages its pin with one lane's slot, moves to one side or the other, and reinserts a pin in the new lane's slot.

== Developments ==
A digital track is shown (SCX, 1995). Digital technology allows cars to change lanes at crossing points and passing-lane sections.

A number of technological developments have been tried over the years to overcome the traditional slot car's limitations. Most lasted only a few years, and are now merely historical curiosities. Around 1962, AMT's Turnpike system used multiple electrical pickups within the slot to allow drivers to control, to a limited extent, the steering of special 1:25 cars.

In the late 1960s the Arnold Minimobil system, also marketed as the Matchbox Motorway, used a long hidden coil, powered by track-side motors, to move die-cast or plastic cars down the track via a slot and detachable pin. Cars in different lanes could race, but cars in the same lane moved at the same speed, separated by a fixed distance.

Also in the 1960s Eldon Industries, Inc. produced 1:32 scale slot cars and sets with a lane change system for analogue cars branded Selectronc that used lane change sections with a dedicated lane change controller. The cars and transformer used diodes to separate the control signals from the hand controllers that allowed for both cars to run independently in the same lane. In the mid and late 1970s several manufacturers including Aurora, Lionel, and Ideal introduced slotless racing systems that theoretically allowed cars to pass one another from the same lane. Most used a system of multiple power rails that allowed one car to speed up momentarily and move to the outside to pass. Though briefly successful as toy products, none of these systems worked well enough to be taken up by serious hobbyists.

In 2004, a number of traditional slot car manufacturers introduced digital control systems, which enable multiple cars to run in the same lane and to change lanes at certain points on the course. Digitally coded signals sent along the power strips allow each car to respond only to its own controller. In addition, manufacturers have used the slot track system to allow the racing of a variety of unusual things, including motorcycles, boats, airplanes, spacecraft, horses, fictional and cartoon vehicles, snowmobiles, and futuristic railroad trains.

== Tracks ==
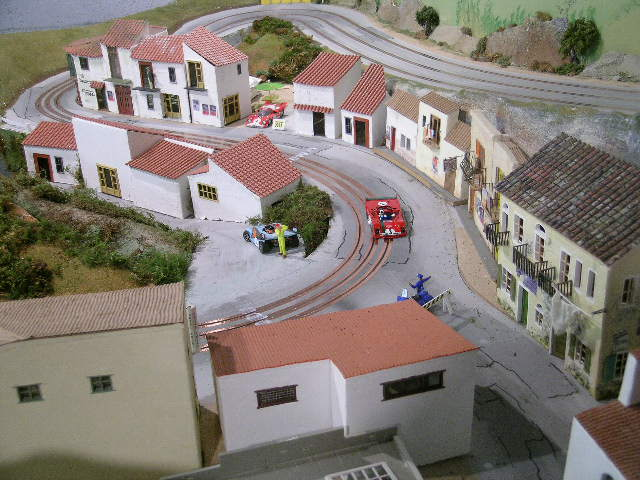
Three-lane routed track inspired by the Targa Florio held in Sicily

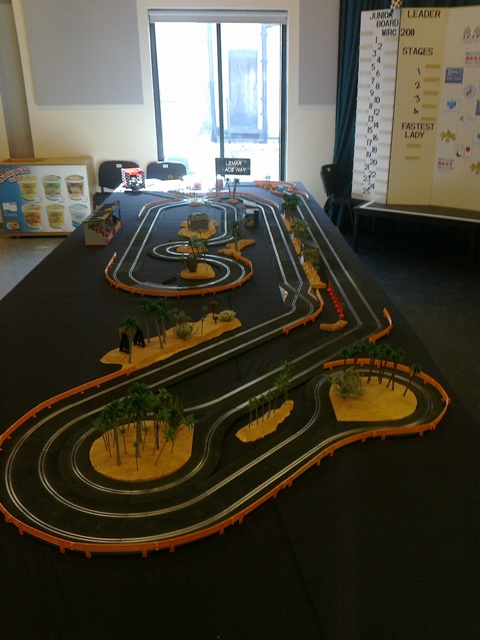
Plastic track created for a charity event

The first sectional slot tracks from Scalextric and VIP were molded rubber and folded metal, respectively, but modern slot tracks fall into two main categories: plastic tracks and routed tracks. Plastic tracks are made from the molded plastic commercial track sections. Sectional track is inexpensive and easy to assemble, and the design of the course can be easily changed. The joints between the sections, however, make a rough running surface, prompting the derisive term "clickety-clack track". The many electrical connections cause voltage drop and contribute to more frequent electrical problems. For a permanent setup, the joints can be filled and smoothed, and the power rails soldered together or even replaced with continuous strips, but the surface is seldom as smooth as a good routed track.

Routed tracks have the entire racecourse made from one or a few pieces of sheet material (traditionally chipboard or MDF, but sometimes polymer materials) with the guide-slots and the grooves for the power strips cut directly into the base material using a router or CNC machining. That provides a smooth and consistent surface, which is generally preferred for serious competition.

== Electrical equipment ==
Types of Slot Car Controllers (L to R, from top): Telegraph key; Thumb button; Wheel or dial rheostat; Carbon disc plunger; Rheostat plunger; Full grip; Pistol grip rheostat; Electronic controller

Power for most slot car tracks comes from a power pack. Power packs contain a transformer, which reduces high voltage house current to a safe 12 to 20V, depending on car type) and usually a rectifier, which changes AC to DC, for cooler running and simpler motors. High-capacity lead-acid batteries are sometimes used for hobby slot cars. Toy race sets may use dry cell batteries at 3 to 6 volts.

Controllers ("throttles") vary car speed by modulating the voltage from the power pack. They are usually hand-held and attached by wires to the track. Besides speed control, modern racing controllers usually feature an adjustable "brake", "coast", and "dial-out". Braking works by temporarily connecting the rails together by a switch (or via a resistor for reduced braking); that converts the car's motor into a generator, and the magnetic forces that turned the motor are now slowing it down. Coast allows a certain amount of power to continue to the track after the driver has "let-off" (which would otherwise cut all power to the car). A dial-out allows the driver to limit the maximum power that can reach the car.

The early rail-car tracks used telegraph keys, model-train rheostats and other improvised means to control car speed. The first commercial race sets (1957) used handheld controllers with a thumb-button; like the telegraph key, these were either on or off, requiring the driver to "blip" the throttle for intermediate speeds. Later versions had an intermediate speed, and one late version used a buzzer mechanism to provide full-range speed control.

From 1959 to about 1965, most HO slot sets had a table-mounted controller with a miniature steering wheel or simple dial-knob operating a rheostat (variable resistor), which gave precise control throughout the car's speed range. This type could be left on a particular speed setting, making it very suitable for model highway layouts, but they were awkward for racing. Around 1960, handheld rheostats began to appear. Most early examples had vertical, thumb-operated plungers with the rheostat in the grip. Aurora had a plunger design in which a stack of carbon/silicon discs replaced the rheostat. Less common styles included a horizontal thumb-plunger and a full-grip squeeze controller. In 1965, Russkit introduced the trigger-operated pistol grip controller. The pistol grip quickly became the standard rheostat-controller style both for race sets and serious hobbyists, and has remained so to the present day. Control is by the index finger, and the heat-generating rheostat is above the grip for comfort and effective ventilation.

For good response, rheostats must be matched to the particular cars involved. To race different classes of cars, several controllers with different resistance ratings are often required. In the 1970s, electronic additions to the rheostat controllers became popular, which allowed them to be tuned to the particular car being raced. Some modern electronic controllers dispense with the rheostat altogether, and can be used for all classes and types of car. Digital slot cars generally use a controller that is trigger operated, though the rheostat housing is replaced by a slim bulge containing the electronics.

On most tracks, a driver will plug or clip his personal controller to his lane's "driver's station", which has wired connections to the power source and track rails. Modern controllers usually require three connections - one to the power terminal of the driver's station (customarily white), one to the brake terminal (red), and one to the track terminal (black). Conventional slot car tracks are wired in one of two ways: with the power terminal connected to the power source positive and the brake terminal negative (called "positive gate"), or the other way around ("negative gate"). Resistance type controllers can be used with either positive or negative track wiring, most electronic controllers can only be used with one or the other, although a few electronic controllers feature a switch that adapts them for either gate configuration.

== Competition ==
Slot car racing ranges from casual get-togethers at home tracks, using whatever cars the host makes available, to very serious competitions in which contestants painstakingly build or modify their own cars for maximum performance and compete in a series of races culminating in national and world championships. For information on types of formal competition, racing organizations, standards, etc., see slot car racing.

== See also ==
- Armature (electrical engineering)
- Inline; Pancake; Sidewinder; Anglewinder–types of slot car motors and motor arrangements
- Mini 4WD
- Radio-controlled car
- Rail transport modelling
- Tether car–gasoline-powered model cars which also run on guided tracks
- List of model car brands
