= Carrera (slot car brand) =

German slot car brand

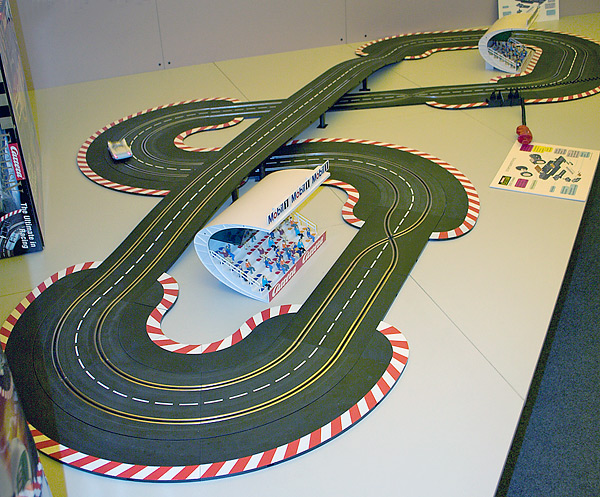
Carrera-Bahn, 1:24 scale, in 2005

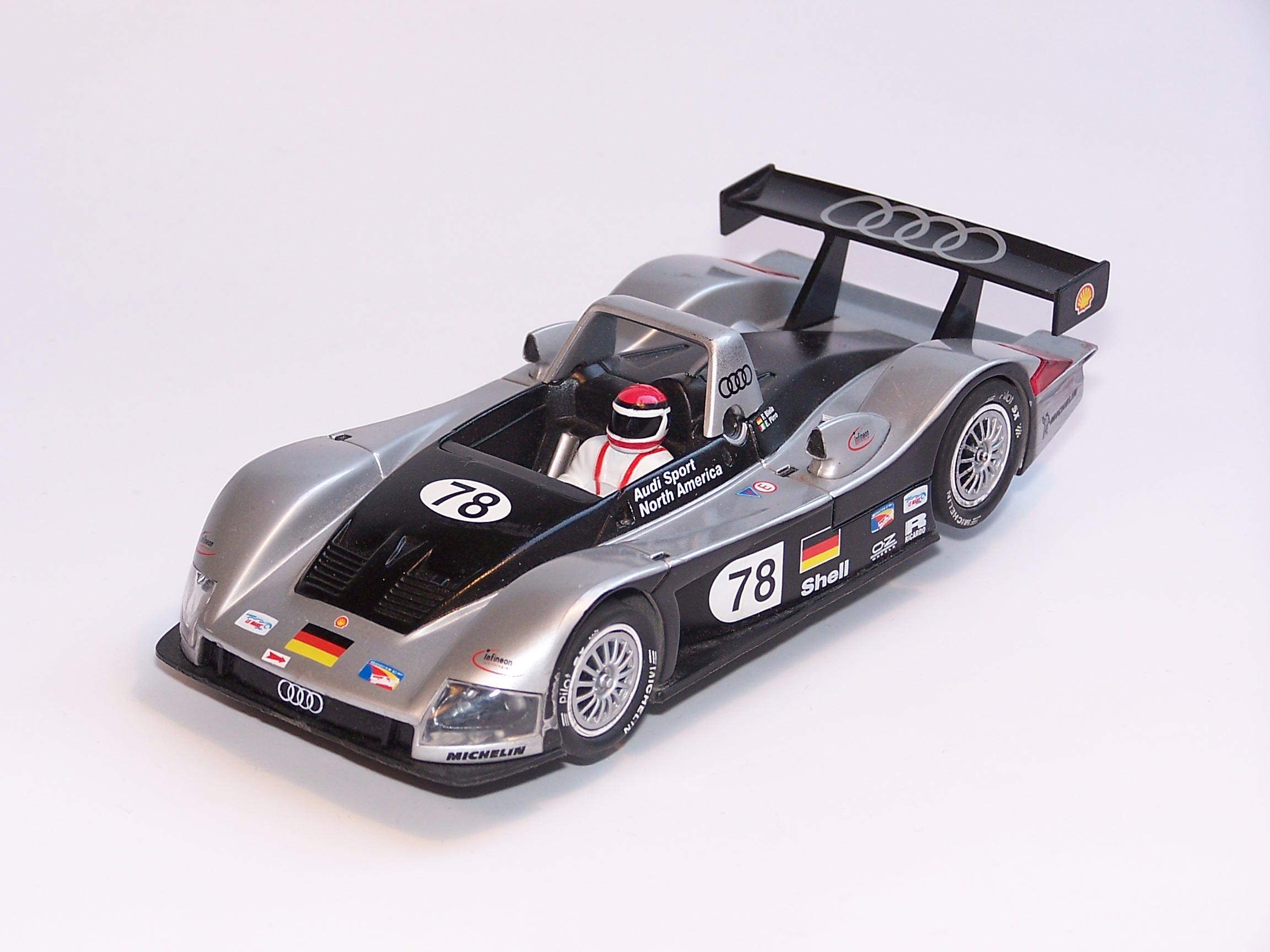
Carrera model of an Audi R8R

Carrera is a slot car brand introduced in the early 1960s by Josef Neuhierl GmbH & Co. KG based in the Franconian town of Fürth, Germany. The name Carrera was inspired by the Porsche Carrera models which took their name from the Carrera Panamericana road race.

Carrera dominated the German markets in the 1960s and 1970s, due to using an additional third wire, and effective marketing, also at the nearby Nuremberg International Toy Fair.

In 1970, Carrera offered 1:24, 1:32 and 1:60 scales for slot cars, and the slot-free "Servo" systems which allowed cars to switch lanes, guided by the guard rails on the outside. Due to the many systems offered, and fewer customers (Generation X), Neuhierl had to sell his company in 1985, and committed suicide. The new owners sold rather cheap products.

In 1999, the Stadlbauer Group from Salzburg, Austria took over. Following the restructuring of Carrera, Stadlbauer company relaunched "Carrera 124" line as a premium product range Carrera Exclusiv. In 2001 "Carrera Go!!!", developed as an action track developed for beginners and the young, was released to the market. Carrera is all about innovation and quality which marked the creation of a smaller scale 1:43. The traditional 1:32 scale, Carrera Evolution, was integrated with new Digital 132 technology. The function of Digital 132 technology is to allow a maximum of six vehicles to overtake each other at high speeds on both analogue and digital racetracks.

For over 40 years in the business, the company has worked closely with the State Trade Agency in Nürnberg who check that Carrera’s lines of products meet the required safety standards. The modern Carrera sports a whole host of authentic top license deals. These include Ferrari, Porsche, Audi, Lamborghini, BMW, Bentley, Nissan, Ford, Subaru, Dodge, Nintendo and NASCAR. On January 1, 2005, the company opened its own subsidiary in the United States, "Carrera of America Inc", in addition to its subsidiary companies in France (since 2006) and in Poland and Hungary.

In 2006, Carrera organized its very first Carrera World Championship and another championship in 2007 until the spring of 2008. September 2007 was the start of the Carrera World Championship at the International Motor Show in Frankfurt.

In 2019, the Stadelbauer GmbH has been acquired by investment group Quantum Capital Partners (QCP). They took over operations of Revell in 2018.
