= Slot car racing =

Type of miniature auto racing

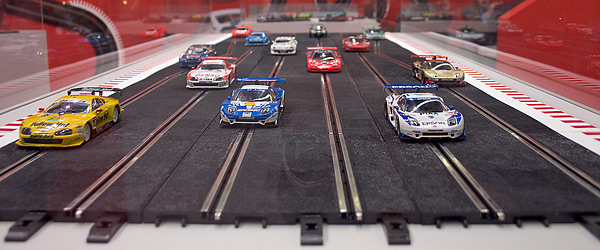
Modern commercially made slot cars and track. Ninco, 1:32 scale.

Slot car racing (also called slotcar racing or slot racing) is the competitive hobby of racing with powered miniature cars (or other vehicles) which are guided by grooves or slots in the track on which they run.

Slot cars are usually models of actual automobiles, though some have bodies purpose-designed for miniature racing. Most enthusiasts use commercially available slot cars (often modified for better performance), others motorize static models, and some "scratch-build," creating their own mechanisms and bodies from basic parts and materials.

Slot car racing ranges from casual get-togethers at home tracks, using whatever cars the host makes available, to very serious competitions in which contestants painstakingly build or modify their own cars for maximum performance and compete in a series of races culminating in a national championship. Some hobbyists, much as in model railroading, build elaborate tracks, sculpted to have the appearance of a real-life racecourse, including miniature buildings, trees and people, while the more purely competitive racers often prefer a track unobstructed by scenery.

Slot car racing was a popular fad in the 1960s, with sales reaching $500 million annually, including 3,000 public courses in the United States alone. The fad sputtered out by the start of the 1970s as amateurs felt squeezed out at races and stayed home in additions to competitions against the radio-controlled car market.

== Common slot car scales ==
There are three common slotcar scales used for competition:

1. 1:24 scale or 1/24, cars are the largest slot cars commonly raced. A typical 1:24 car might be 7 to 8 inches (18 to 20 centimetres) long. 1:24 cars require a course so large as to be impractical for many home enthusiasts, so most serious 1:24 racing is done at commercial or club tracks.
2. 1:32 scale or 1/32, cars are smaller and more suited to home-sized race courses but they are also widely raced on commercial tracks, in hobby shops or in clubs. A 1:32 car averages 5 to 6 inches (13 to 15 centimetres).
3. HO scale, a generalized size, originally 1:76-1:87, now usually closer to 1:64 scale. Cars vary in size, running from 1:87 (generally the older cars) to 1:64 in scale; but they all run on track of approximately the same width, and are generically referred to as HO slot cars. A typical car is from 2.5 to 3.5 inches (6.4 to 8.9 centimetres). Though there is HO racing on commercial and shop-tracks, probably most HO racing occurs on home racetracks.

In addition to the major scales, 1:43 in 2006 slot car sets are generally marketed as children's toys. So far, there is little organized competition in 1:43, but the scale is gaining some acceptance among adult hobbyists for its affordability and moderate space requirements. An average car would be 4.3 in (11 cm).

== Slot car tracks for competition ==
Many home racetracks are made from the injection molded-plastic snap together track sections found in race sets; these courses are known as "Plastic Tracks or "Click Tracks."

Shop and club tracks used for competition (especially in 1:32 and 1:24 scales) are usually hand built "Routed Tracks" in which the guide slots for the entire racecourse are routed into one or a few large pieces of sheet material (such as chipboard or Medium-density fibreboard) providing a smooth and consistent surface.

Competition tracks are usually laid out as road courses with many turns, though ovals and "tank tread" (trapezoidal) ovals are also fairly common. On a road course or oval, each car and each lane is generally marked with "lane tape" of a distinguishing color, allowing the corner marshals (officials) to return cars that have spun off the track to the proper lane.

Generally, tracks for formal competition may have banked corners and may bridge one section over another, but may not otherwise use "trick" configurations. Home tracks often include special features to increase the drama and/or challenge of racing, such as slots that wiggle or squeeze the lanes together, bumps, airborne jumps, or uneven surfaces, but these are typically called "toy" tracks and are not used for competition.

A different segment of the hobby is slot car drag racing on a long straight strip of track. In HO size, these dragstrips are often a scale quarter-mile.

1:24 Scale tracks used for competition are generally 6-8 lane routed tracks with either wooden or flexible plastic retaining walls. The tracks are usually located in commercial or purpose-built racing centres. Most of the tracks used in the USRA regional and national events are either original American Raceways (AMF) commercial tracks or variations of these designs made from original blueprints. Tracks used in other countries, including those used for the ISRA World Championships are often more recent designs. Generally tracks used for regional or national competition have an epoxy or polymer painted surface with recessed braided electrical contacts. In USRA Division 1, the use of traction-enhancing compounds on the racing surface ("glue" or "goop") may be applied to the racing surface by the competitors.

One type of 1:24 commercial track is the "Blue King" (155-foot lap length) which is the track that is recognized for world records in 1:24 racing The 2017 world record qualifying lap is held by Brad Friesner at 1.347 seconds, which computes to 78.45 mph. The "King" track segments are "named" starting from the main straight in an anti-clock wise direction: bank, chute, deadman (corner), finger, back straight, 90 (corner), donut (corner), lead-on, and top-turn. Generally the "King" tracks are used for wing-car racing, where un-banked "flat" tracks of various designs are used for scale racing. An example of a championship "flat" track is the Gary Gerding designed track installed in July 2007 at Mid-America Raceway and Hobbies near Aurora, IL (the site of the 2009 USRA Division 2 National Championships)and the 2010 ISRA world championships.

Another example of a 1:24 scale track is called the "Engleman Grandstand". It is 220-foot in lap length and eight lanes wide. It is a favorite for fast cars with its long straights and high deep bank. One can be found still in operation in Rock Hill, South Carolina at The Slot Car Cave. There is another at Scale Model Supplies in Saint Paul, Minnesota.

1:32 Scale competition is generally run on the same routed tracks as 1:24, at least in the USA.

HO Scale competition tracks are typically between 60 and 100 ft in length and 4 to 6 lanes wide. Plastic tracks, often modified for improved performance, are more common in HO competition than in the larger scales, as is the use of large home courses for formal racing.

'Dirty' tracks - these tracks are mainly used for rally and raid.

Slotcar during a rally race

== Electrical (power) standards for competition ==
1:24 racing is usually at 14 volts for qualifying and 12 volts under racing conditions. 1:32 racing is between 12 and 16 volts depending on type of car. Most HO rules require tracks to provide voltage between 18.5 and 19.0 volts, and at least 5 amperes per lane. Certain European 1:24 racing events use 18.2 to 19.0 volts DC.

Many tracks use banks of lead-acid batteries to produce sufficient high amp DC power, but in recent years, relatively inexpensive high-quality electronically regulated power supplies have become more popular to achieve consistent and clean power.

== Competition formats ==
Several race formats are employed in competition as time allows. The quickest to run is called round robin, which can be run in either of two ways. The first (and least common) way is begin with one driver on one lane of the track, a segment usually consisting of 2 minutes is run in which the driver attempts to complete as many laps as they can.

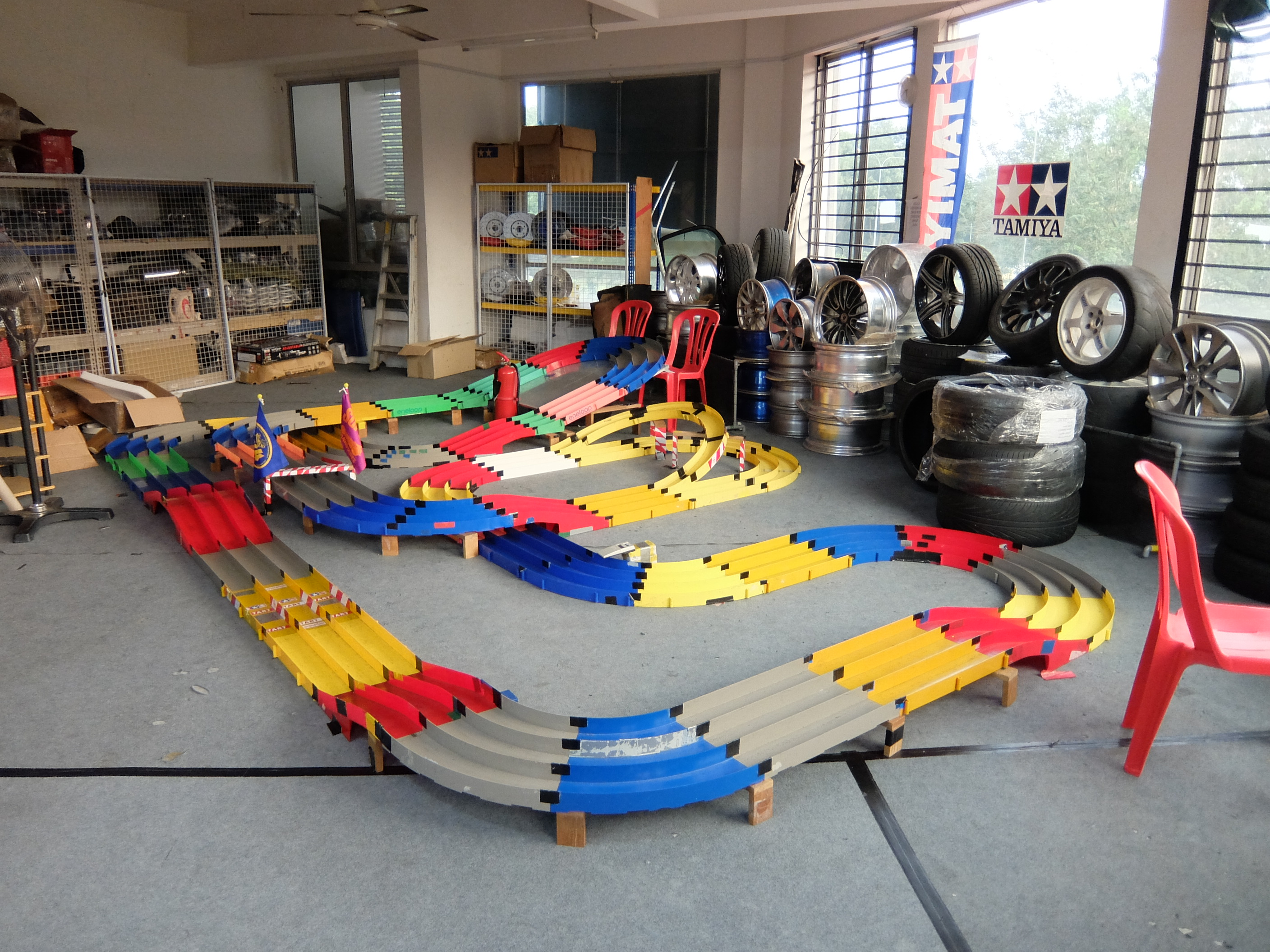
Modern commercially made Tamiya cars and track. 1:32 scale.

The second (and most common) way to run a round robin is to have four drivers (or as many as there are lanes) start at a time, and rotate through all the lanes, before being replaced by the next set of drivers. This is known as a "heat" or "consi". Often a small amount of practice time (usually 30 seconds) will be given to the drivers prior to the start of each heat. If there are an odd number of drivers such that they are not wholly divisible into the number of lanes, one of two measures is taken: either a heat is run with one or more positions unfilled, or a heat is run with extra drivers, with a "sit-out" position. After all drivers have run their heat, placement is determined by total laps completed.

Often round robins are modified to include a "main" and sometimes also a "last-chance" heat. When run with a main, the round robin is run as normal, but at the end the top competitors (as many as there are lanes) run an extra heat. This heat is usually longer (3 to 5 minutes per segment, 1.5 "pit" time, and 1 minute practice before the heat). At the end the drivers are re-placed based on the new lap totals.

Last-chance heats are similar to mains. The top competitors (number of lanes minus one) from the round robin move into the main, and the runners-up (as many as there are lanes) are moved into the last chance heat. The last chance heat is run before the main, and is usually run with the same time parameters as the other heats. At the end, the top competitors from the last-chance are re-placed based on their new lap totals (though never lower than a competitor that didn't make the last-chance), and the winner of the heat moves into the final position in the main.

Bracketed formats are usually reserved for national events, and include qualifying, elimination consis, semifinals, and a main.

When the segment time has elapsed, a small amount of time, usually one minute, is given for the driver to switch lanes, perform any necessary maintenance to his car, and return his car to its resting position (albeit in a different lane). At the same time, the next driver in the succession moves into the first lane, placing his car at the starting position. When a driver completes all the lanes, his total laps and final position are recorded. This continues until all drivers have completed all lanes. Lap totals are compared to determine placement.

Most racing organisations allow a "track call" (where the power is turned off) for a situation where a race car is in the wrong lane. This is also referred to as a "rider" and is considered to be a dangerous and unfair situation. Track calls are also sometimes used in the event that a car flies off the table and cannot be located by a marshal.

== Slot racing organizations ==
1:24 scale racing organizations There are many different local, regional, national, and international organizations for 1:24 scale slot cars. 1:24 scale is primarily raced at commercial slot car raceways. The largest US organisation, holding two Divisional USA National Championship events every year, is the USRA: United Slot Racers Association established in January 1968. The International Slot Racing Association (ISRA) sanctions a World Slot Car Racing Championship in a different country every year.

The USRA is the organizer of the USRA National Championship for Division 1 and Division 2 racing. The USRA also sanctions the "Wing Car Worlds" when it is held in the United States.

The National Slot Car Scale Racing Association is known as NSCSRA. It was formed in 1989 for the purpose of promoting "Fair and Equal Racing for all" who enjoy slot cars as a hobby. The rules were established in 1989 to insure the fair and equal racing concept for all participants. Up to four times a year NSCSRA holds a Championship for various classes including Vintage Scale Racing, Flexi and Unlimited Racing.

1:32 scale racing organizations The International Slot Racing Association (ISRA) sanctions a World Slot Car Racing Championship in a different country every year.

In 2004, the True Scale Racing Federation (TSRF) was established by former pro 1:24 racer Phillipe de Lespinay with the goal being to establish a North American "true scale" 1:24 and 1:32 North American racing series. The TSRF concept is very similar to full-scale "spec" racing where only TSRF approved equipment can be used for competition. Many other countries have national organisations, for example the British Slot Car Racing Association (BSCRA) have been running national championships since 1964.

HO organizations There are two large HO racing organizations in the US: HOPRA (the HO Professional Racing Association) and UFHORA (the United Federation of HO Racers Association). Each hosts a national competition annually, usually in July. There are many statewide organizations running under HOPRA and/or UFHORA rule sets.

"The Fray In Ferndale" boasts the largest turnout of any slot car race in the world. The highly competitive race is held yearly, in March, and more than 100 individuals and 16 teams show up to race on 8 tables. This is the race that determines the direction that the hobby takes. The race has been held since 1997.

Unlike 1:24 scale tracks, HO race tracks can be small enough to fit in common basements. Therefore, most state organizations run some, if not most, of their series on home tracks as opposed to hobby shop tracks. Additionally, home tracks are often used for national competition.

HO Scale oval racing is very popular in the Northeastern United States. The cars are molded to look like Dirt Modifieds and Sprint Cars. The Sprint Cars and Dirt Modified cars are raced on oval tracks with 4 to 8 lanes.

== USA competition classes ==
=== 1:24 racing classes ===
Most 1:24 racing series use some variation of the USRA Division 1 or Division 2 rules. The USRA rules have their roots in the NCC rules of the early 1970s which were written with the goal of making a number of under-classes in slot racing to allow more diversity in competition.

=== USRA division 1 ===
- a) Spec-15: Amateur only
- b) GP-12: Amateur and Expert
- c) International 15 (15A): Amateur and Expert
- d) Cobalt 12/15: Amateur and Expert
- e) Group 27: Amateur and Expert
- f) Group 27 Light: Restricted single class of Group 27 racing
- g) Group 7 (open): Semi-Pro and Pro

There is also a class in its genesis called "One Motor Open" that is similar to Group 7 with the difference being that motor changes after tech are not allowed.

=== USRA division 2 ===
- a) Group 10 Stock Car
- b) JRL
- c) GTP
- d) GT-1
- e) GT-12
- f) C-12e
- g) 1/32 F-1 Eurosport
- h) 1/32 Eurosport
- i) 1/24 Eurosport

=== USRA division 3: (proposed) ===
- a) Nostalgia Can-Am
- b) Vintage NASCAR
- c) Nostalgia F1
- d) Nostalgia LeMans Coupe
- e) Can-Am Pro (anglewinder)

Note: in spite of the USRA not yet recognizing "Division 3", independent sanctioning bodies on the east and west coasts have been organizing and hosting Nostalgia Can-Am and Nostalgia F1 races.

=== Formula-2000 ===
F-2000 is raced primarily in the Midwest; it is a variation of the USRA Division 1 rules with the prime exception being traction/braking "glue" is not allowed to be applied to the racing surface by participants. Motor changes once the race has started are not allowed, and there are other rules restrictions intended to reduce the cost of participation.

Other international organisations such as the IMCA and ISRA have their own classifications and technical regulations.

=== 1:32 racing classes ===
Many types of races exist for 1:32 racing classes.

- Speed
- Rally - world rally cars, production, super 1600, ...
- Raid - T1, T2, T3, T4, T5

To note that in rally and raid races it is frequent to include 'dirty' races, e.g. snow or dirt.

=== HO racing classes ===
HOPRA and UFHORA run similar classes and similar rules for those classes. General rules specify the size of the car and anything else that pertains to all classes.

- Superstock (HOPRA and UFHORA): Cars may have at most four magnets (two to drive the motor and two "traction" magnets for additional downforce). All magnets must be ceramic. Motors must be stock, and may be balanced and/or trued (referred to as "hot-stock").
- Modified (HOPRA): Also known as "ceramic modified" is the same as superstock above, but the motor is unrestricted and the chassis may be sanded.
- Modified (UFHORA): Cars may have at most four magnets (2 to drive the motor and 2 "traction" magnets for additional downforce). Motor magnets must be ceramic, traction magnets may be polymer. Motor must have a resistance of no less than 3.0 Ω on each pole.
- Polymer Modified (HOPRA)/Restricted Open (UFHORA): Cars may have at most four magnets (two to drive the motor and two "traction" magnets for additional downforce). All magnets may be polymer. Motor is unrestricted. Chassis may be sanded. Shunt wires may be used.
- Unlimited (UFHORA and HOPRA): No restrictions. Custom chassis permitted. Six neodymium magnets are usually employed.
- T-Jet Super Stock (AKA Fray-style): Aurora Thunderjet chassis with no traction magnets, modified by motor magnets, changing axles, front and rear wheels and tires, and the body. Limited modifications are allowed.

== In the UK ==
The main governing body of UK slot racing is BSCRA, which is responsible for the organisation of most UK slot racing events. The current chairman is Mark Witham. The association organises three national championships: The 1/32- and 1/24-scale nationals plus a club team championship with production challenge. The association also organises the British open championships for both scales. There are also a number of Area-based competitions as well as newcomer orientated competitions to get them out of their club. However Ninco, HO and Scalex Racing are run by their own council and not affiliated with BSCRA.

BSCC (British Slot Car Club) HQ is at Millstream Raceway, Ringwood, Hampshire and is the UK's largest slot racing centre with 2 × 8-lane Ogilvie Custom Tracks, including the mega 205' 8-lane BSCC Daytona Speedway. Millstream has been the world's largest customer of Ogilvie Custom Tracks and is about to take delivery of their 11th track based on the famous Ogilvie Super-8. BSCC host the British Wing Car Championships.

== Current standings ==
ISRA 2024 World Driver Rankings

| Ranking | Driver | Country |
|---|---|---|
| 1st | Dominykas Budrys | (Lithuania) LTU |
| 2nd | Vladimir Horky | (Czech Republic) CZE |
| 3rd | Frantisek Poledna | (Czech Republic) CZE |
| 4 | Jaroslav Recek | (Czech Republic) CZE |
| 5 | Raivis Jansons | (Latvia) LVA |
| 6 | James Cleave | (United Kingdom) GBR |
| 7 | Luca Sbrana | (Italy) ITA |
| 8 | Piero Castricone | (Italy) ITA |
| 9 | Daniel Blomqvist | (Sweden) SWE |
| 10 | Jiri Karlik | (Czech Republic) CZE |

ISRA

The 2025 ISRA World Championships will be held in Czech Republic.

== See also ==
- Powertrack
- Slot.it Challenge
