= Taro Kudo =

Japanese video game designer and composer

Taro Kudo 工藤 太郎
- Occupations: Video game designer, Video game music Composer and Sound Designer
- Years active: 1991–present

Taro Kudo (工藤 太郎, Kudō Tarō) is a Japanese video game designer and video game music composer. He is best known for his work on the Mario role-playing games. He began his career working for Konami and Square in the 1990s, then joined fellow ex-Square designers at Love-de-Lic in 1996, where he designed UFO: A Day in the Life. Kudo worked as company director for Vanpool prior to its disestablishment.

== Ludography ==
Year	Game	Role(s)
1991	Super Castlevania IV	Music
1992	Axelay	Music
1993	Akumajō Dracula (X68000)	Music
1996	Super Mario RPG	Event designer
1997	Moon: Remix RPG Adventure	Game designer, music
1999	UFO: A Day in the Life	Game designer
2001	Endonesia	Game designer
2003	Mario & Luigi: Superstar Saga	Mini-games
2006	Freshly-Picked Tingle's Rosy Rupeeland	Director
2008	Let's Pilates	Director
2009	Irozuki Tincle no Koi no Balloon Trip	Game designer
2012	Dillon's Rolling Western	Voice of Dillon
2012	Paper Mario: Sticker Star	Director, scenario
2013	Dillon's Rolling Western: The Last Ranger	Voice of Dillon
2014	Super Smash Bros. for Nintendo 3DS / Wii U	Voice of Dillon
2015	Chibi-Robo! Zip Lash	Producer
2016	Paper Mario: Color Splash	Director, scenario
2018	Dillon's Dead-Heat Breakers	Voice of Dillon
2018	Super Smash Bros. Ultimate	Voice of Dillon
2020	Paper Mario: The Origami King	Event director, scenario
2023	Super Mario RPG	Event director, writing
2024	Paper Mario: The Thousand-Year Door	Text editing, event supervisor
2025	Metroid Prime 4: Beyond	Japanese Script Writer
