= Risa Tabata =

Video game producer

- 田端里沙
- Born: Osaka, Japan
- Education: Osaka University of Foreign Studies
- Occupations: Video game producer, Production coordinator
- Years active: 2001-present
- Employer: Nintendo
- Notable work: Metroid Prime; Donkey Kong Country; Paper Mario

Risa Tabata (Japanese: 田端里沙, Hepburn: Tabata Risa) is a Japanese video game producer and production coordinator working at Nintendo.

== Career ==
Tabata was born in Osaka and graduated from Osaka University of Foreign Studies as a liberal arts student majoring in Chinese. After graduating, she applied to Nintendo with the intent of doing clerical work at the company, influenced by her experience of playing Famicom games with her younger brother back in middle school. Upon being hired in April 2001, Tabata would instead find herself as part of Nintendo Entertainment Analysis and Development, despite lacking any knowledge of game design at the time, and immediately assigned to be the production coordinator for Metroid Prime, assisting with communication between the Japanese Nintendo team and the Austin, Texas-based Retro Studios alongside senior Nintendo employee and producer Kensuke Tanabe.

Following this, Tabata would continue to work on externally-developed Nintendo projects as an assistant producer and production manager under Tanabe, most notably on subsequent Metroid Prime games, as well as entries in the Donkey Kong Country and Paper Mario series.

On Paper Mario: Color Splash, Tabata served as a co-producer. She helped shape the game's thematic focus on color and its distinctive visual style inspired by paper textures. Tabata explained that the idea originated from a colleague whose children were interested in painting, and the team sought to use the Wii U’s HD capabilities and touchscreen to enhance gameplay through a card based combat system. Tabata emphasized the game’s puzzle-solving elements, the strategic use of limited resources in battle, and the inclusion of real-world objects for humorous contrast. As her first Paper Mario title, she aimed to bring fresh ideas and humor, working closely with localization teams to adapt jokes for different audiences and enhance the emotional depth of the story, particularly through the character Huey.

For the next installment, Paper Mario: The Origami King, Tabata continued her role in steering the creative direction of the series by advocating for new gameplay ideas and visual themes. She collaborated with Intelligent Systems to introduce the concepts of origami and confetti as the central theme aiming to surprise players. Inspired by Nintendo’s design philosophy to innovate with each installment, Tabata contributed the origami concept, envisioning characters like Princess Peach transformed into folded paper forms.

Following the announcement of Tanabe's retirement in January 2026, he stated should another Metroid Prime game be greenlit, Tabata would likely succeed his role.

== Ludography ==
Year	Game	Credit(s)	Ref.
2002	Metroid Prime	Coordinator	
2004	Metroid Prime 2: Echoes	Assistant producer, coordinator	
2004	WarioWare: Touched!	Voice acting	
2005	Tottoko Hamtaro Nazonazo Q: Kumonoue no? Jou	Supervisor	
2007	Metroid Prime 3: Corruption	Assistant producer, coordinator	
2008	Captain Rainbow	Assistant producer	
2009	New Play Control! Metroid Prime	Assistant producer, coordinator	
2009	PictureBook Games: Pop-Up Pursuit	Assistant producer	
2009	Punch-Out!!	Assistant producer	
2009	New Play Control! Chibi-Robo!	Coordinator	
2009	Metroid Prime: Trilogy	Assistant producer, coordinator	
2009	PictureBook Games: The Royal Bluff	Assistant producer	
2009	Eco Shooter: Plant 530	Coordinator	
2010	Donkey Kong Country Returns	Assistant producer	
2010	Snowpack Park	Coordinator	
2011	Sakura Samurai: Art of the Sword	Coordinator	
2012	Dillon's Rolling Western	Coordinator, supervisor	
2013	Game & Wario	Directing support, game design	
2013	Nintendoji	Assistant producer	
2013	Dillon's Rolling Western: The Last Ranger	Coordinator, supervisor	
2013	Chibi-Robo! Photo Finder	Assistant producer	
2014	Donkey Kong Country: Tropical Freeze	Assistant producer	
2015	Chibi-Robo! Zip Lash	Assistant producer, chief director	
2016	Paper Mario: Color Splash	Assistant producer	
2018	Dillon's Dead-Heat Breakers	Assistant producer, coordinator	
2020	Paper Mario: The Origami King	Assistant producer	
2022	Mario Strikers: Battle League	Project management	
2023	Metroid Prime Remastered	Assistant producer	
2023	WarioWare: Move It!	Project management	
2024	Paper Mario: The Thousand-Year Door	Producer	
2024	Luigi's Mansion 2 HD	Project management	
2025	Donkey Kong Country Returns HD	Original game supervisor	
2025	Metroid Prime 4: Beyond	Assistant producer, progress management	
