= Also sprach Zarathustra =

1896 symphonic poem by Richard Strauss

- Tone poem by Richard Strauss
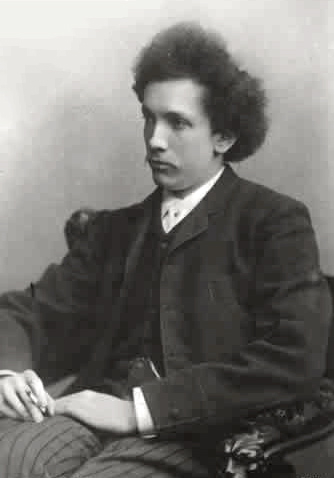
- Strauss in 1894
- Opus: 30
- Based on: Nietzsche's philosophical novel
- Composed: 1896
- Duration: 33 minutes
- Scoring: Large orchestra

Premiere
- Date: 27 November 1896
- Location: Frankfurt
- Conductor: Richard Strauss

Also sprach Zarathustra, Op. 30 (German: [ˈalzo ʃpʁaːx t͡saʁaˈtʊstʁa], Thus Spoke Zarathustra or Thus Spake Zarathustra) is a tone poem by the German composer Richard Strauss, written in 1896 and inspired by Friedrich Nietzsche's 1883–1885 philosophical work of the same name. Strauss conducted its first performance on 27 November 1896 in Frankfurt. A typical performance lasts approximately 33 minutes.

The initial fanfare – titled "Sonnenaufgang" ("Sunrise") in the composer's programme notes – became well and widely known after its repeated use as the main musical theme in Stanley Kubrick's 1968 film 2001: A Space Odyssey. Thereafter, Eumir Deodato's hit jazz-funk adaptation of the piece won the 1974 Grammy Award for Best Pop Instrumental Performance.

== Instrumentation ==
The work is orchestrated for piccolo, 3 flutes (3rd doubling piccolo), 3 oboes, English horn, clarinet in E♭, 2 clarinets in B♭, bass clarinet in B♭, 3 bassoons, contrabassoon, 6 horns in F and E, 4 trumpets in C and E, 3 trombones, 2 tubas, timpani, bass drum, cymbals, triangle, glockenspiel, bell on low E, organ, and strings: 2 harps, violins I, II (16 each), violas (12), cellos (12), and double basses (8) (with low B string).

== Structure ==
"Sunrise"
Opening fanfare

The piece is divided into nine sections played with only three definite pauses. Strauss named the sections after selected chapters of Friedrich Nietzsche's novel Thus Spoke Zarathustra:

1. "Sonnenaufgang" (Sunrise)
2. "Von den Hinterweltlern" (Of the Backworldsmen)
3. "Von der großen Sehnsucht" (Of the Great Longing)
4. "Von den Freuden und Leidenschaften" (Of Joys and Passions)
5. "Das Grablied" (The Song of the Grave)
6. "Von der Wissenschaft" (Of Science and Learning)
7. "Der Genesende" (The Convalescent)
8. "Das Tanzlied" (The Dance Song)
9. "Nachtwandlerlied" (Song of the Night Wanderer)

These selected chapters from Nietzsche's novel highlight major moments of the character Zarathustra's philosophical journey in the novel. The general storylines and ideas in these chapters were the inspiration used to build the tone poem's structure.

The "dawn" motif

The piece starts with a sustained double low C on the double basses, contrabassoon and church organ. This transforms into the brass fanfare of the Introduction and introduces the "dawn" motif (from "Zarathustra's Prologue", the text of which is included in the printed score) that is common throughout the work; the motif includes three notes, in intervals of a fifth and octave, as C–G–C (known also as the Nature-motif). On its first appearance, the motif is a part of the first five notes of the natural overtone series: octave, octave and fifth, two octaves, two octaves and major third (played as part of a C major chord with the third doubled). The major third is immediately changed to a minor third, which is the first note played in the work (E♭) that is not part of the overtone series.

"Of the Backworldsmen" begins with cellos, double-basses and organ pedal before changing into a lyrical passage for the entire section.

"Of the Great Longing" introduces motifs that are more chromatic in nature.

"Of Joys and Passions", in C minor, marks the first subject theme of the work's allegro (exposition) proper.

The strings prevail in "The Song of the Grave", in which some would say the second subject theme, in B minor, starts.

The following portion of the piece can be analyzed as a large development section. "Of Science and Learning" features an unusual fugue beginning at measure 201 in the double-basses and cellos, which consists of all twelve notes of the chromatic scale. Measure 223 contains one of the few sections in the orchestral literature where the basses must play a contra B (the lowest B on a piano), which is only possible on a 5-string bass or (less frequently) on a 4-string bass with a low-B extension.

The development continues in "The Convalescent". By the end of this section, there is a prolonged retransition over the dominant of C major.

Back in C major, "The Dance Song" marks the recapitulation. It features a very prominent violin solo throughout the section. Later in this section, elements from "The Song of the Grave" (the second subject theme) are heard in the work's original key.

"Song of the Night Wanderer" marks the coda of the tone poem. It begins with 12 strikes of midnight. The end of the "Song of the Night Wanderer" leaves the piece half-resolved, with high flutes, piccolos and violins playing a B major chord, while the lower strings pluck a C.

One of the major compositional themes of the piece is the contrast between the keys of B major, representing humanity, and C major, representing the universe. Because B and C are adjacent notes, these keys are tonally dissimilar: B major uses five sharps, while C major has none.

== World riddle theme ==
There are two opinions about the world riddle theme. One is that the fifth/octave intervals (C–G–C^{8va}) constitute the World riddle motif. The other is that the two conflicting keys in the final section represent the World riddle (C–G–C B–F♯–B^{8va}), with the unresolved harmonic progression being an unfinished or unsolved riddle: the melody does not conclude with a well-defined tonic note as being either C or B, hence it is unfinished. The ending of the composition has been described:

But the riddle is not solved. The tone-poem ends enigmatically in two keys, the Nature-motif plucked softly, by the basses in its original key of C—and above the woodwinds, in the key of B major. The unsolvable end of the universe: for Strauss was not pacified by Nietzsche's solution.

— Essay from Old and Sold.com

Neither C major nor B major is established as the tonic at the end of the composition.

== Notable performances and recordings ==
The French premiere was on 22 January 1899, under the baton of Strauss himself, with the Orchestre Lamoureux in Paris. That same concert, Strauss also conducted pieces from Lohengrin and Die Meistersinger von Nürnberg, both by Wagner, as well as Beethoven's seventh symphony.

The first recording was made in 1924 with Max von Schilling and the Staatskapelle Berlin and the first electrically recorded version was made in 1935 with Serge Koussevitzky and the Boston Symphony Orchestra. In 1944, Strauss conducted the Vienna Philharmonic in an experimental high fidelity recording of the piece, made on a German Magnetophon tape recorder. This was later released on LP by Vanguard Records and on CD by various labels. Strauss's friend and colleague, Fritz Reiner, made the first stereophonic recording of the music with the Chicago Symphony Orchestra in March 1954 for RCA Victor. In 2012, this recording was added to the Library of Congress's National Recording Registry 2011 list of "culturally, historically, or aesthetically important" American sound recordings. Thus Spake Zarathustra by the Philharmonia Orchestra conducted by Lorin Maazel reached No. 33 in the UK chart in 1969. The recording of the opening fanfare used for the film 2001: A Space Odyssey was a 1959 recording performed by the Vienna Philharmonic and conducted by Herbert von Karajan.

== In popular culture ==
- Elvis Presley used the opening theme as entrance music during live performances from 1971-1977. Notable examples include the 1973 Aloha from Hawaii concert, which was broadcast via satellite to a global audience and sold-out shows at New York's Madison Square Garden.
- In 1979 film Moonraker the hunt trumpet plays the first notes of the theme in the hunting scene at Hugo Drax's mansion.
- The BBC used the theme in its television coverage of the Apollo space missions.
- Brazilian musician Eumir Deodato's jazz-funk styled arrangement of the opening fanfare Sunrise theme, titled "Also Sprach Zarathustra (2001)", reached No. 2 on the Billboard Hot 100 U.S. popular music sales charts in 1973, No. 3 in Canada, and No. 7 on the UK Singles Chart. Deodato's version won the 1974 Grammy Award for Best Pop Instrumental Performance.
- Retired professional wrestler and pop culture personality Ric Flair used several versions of the opening fanfare as his entrance theme for the majority of his 50-year in-ring career.
- As of January 10, 2026, the American band Phish has performed this theme 277 times since its live debut July 16, 1993, at The Mann Center for the Performing Arts in Philadelphia, including 17 times at the New York City arena Madison Square Garden.
- Ray Conniff recorded a version entitled Bah Bah Conniff Sprach (Zarathustra) for his 1973 album You Are the Sunshine of My Life.
- American rock band Blink-182 has long used the theme as their concert opener.
- The song is an integral part of the University of South Carolina Gamecocks football team's pregame field entrance.
- It was used during the climactic scene of the animated film WALL-E (2008), when the Captain of the Axiom finally gets his ability to walk again and powers down the autopilot.
- It has been used at the start of the 24 Hours of Le Mans since 2010 and more recently at the start of any race of FIA World Endurance Championship and European Le Mans Series.
- It was parodied in Paper Mario: Sticker Star and Paper Mario: Color Splash, both when the fan is used in battle. It was also used again in Paper Mario: The Origami King when the fan rose up in the background after Mario completes a puzzle in Bonehead Island.
- It was used twice in Greta Gerwig's 2023 film Barbie, first in an opening scene that parodies "The Dawn of Man" sequence from 2001: A Space Odyssey, and again as part of the score cue "Ken Makes a Discovery."
- The "Sunrise" portion was cited by film editor Myron Kerstein as the inspiration for the final score extension that concludes "Defying Gravity," the cliffhanger finale of Wicked (2024), the first of Universal Pictures' two-part film adaptation of the stage musical of the same name. After Elphaba's battle cry, which usually ends the song, the score extension plays the "Unlimited" motif (based on the first four notes of "Over the Rainbow") in Strauss' triumphant style, followed by a powerful final note utilizing the timpani hits.

== Arrangements ==
In 2023, Edition Peters issued a chamber ensemble (16 or 18 musicians) adaptation of Also sprach Zarathustra, arranged by Germán García Vargas.
