= Chibi-Robo! Zip Lash =

2015 video game

- Game icon
- Developers: Skip Ltd.; Vanpool
- Publisher: Nintendo
- Directors: Jun Tsuda; Keita Eto; Risa Tabata
- Producers: Kensuke Tanabe; Taro Kudo; Hiroshi Suzuki
- Designers: Yuki Watanabe; Takamasa Saitou
- Programmer: Hironori Ahiko
- Artist: Akira Katsuta
- Composers: Hirofumi Taniguchi; Kiyoshi Hazemoto; Soshiro Hokkai
- Series: Chibi-Robo!
- Platform: Nintendo 3DS
- Release: JP: October 8, 2015; NA: October 9, 2015; EU: November 6, 2015
- Genre: Platform
- Mode: Single-player

Chibi-Robo! Zip Lash (Note: Known in Japan as Nagenawa Akushon! Guruguru! Chibi-Robo! (なげなわアクション！ぐるぐる！ちびロボ！; Lasso Action! We are Going Around! Chibi Robo!)) is a 2015 platform game developed by Skip Ltd. and Vanpool and published by Nintendo for the Nintendo 3DS. It is the fifth installment in the Chibi-Robo! series, and the second Chibi-Robo! game for the 3DS after Chibi-Robo! Photo Finder (2014). Zip Lash players control the character Chibi-Robo, a robot that is tasked with roaming the world and defending its natural resources from a fleet of invading aliens. Chibi-Robo is equipped with a cord and plug with which he can attack enemies and get to inaccessible places. Throughout the levels, the player can find collectibles such as big coins, Chibi-Tots, and snacks that are based on real-world brands.

The game is distinguishable from the previous installments in the Chibi-Robo! series, which uses elements from the adventure genre. The decision to shift genres was taken in the hope of expanding the franchise's fanbase in the US, and to assist mechanics developed for the game. Developers chose the character Chibi-Robo to create a game that suited him, as well as to be commercially successful. The snack collectibles were included into the game to give scale to Chibi-Robo and to be recognizable to the player. While wanting to further develop the character for future games, developers feared this could be the last installment of the series if sales did not meet expectations.

Zip Lash was a commercial failure and received mixed reviews from critics with praise for the visuals, sound, and overall charm but criticism for its level design, controls, and gameplay mechanics, with many calling the game unoriginal and uninspired. Zip Lash is currently the most recent game in the series and is believed to be the last, with the series developer, Skip Ltd., dissolving in 2020.

== Gameplay ==
Chibi-Robo in the first level of the first world in the game, Oceania, preparing to launch his whip-lash at an enemy in front of him, by swinging it in circles

Unlike the first three games in the series, Chibi-Robo! Zip Lash is a side-scrolling platformer rather than an adventure platformer. The player takes control of the robot Chibi-Robo with the goal of reaching the end of the level, which is signified by an unidentified flying object (UFO). Chibi-Robo has a multi-functional power cord, one of whose main functions is the Whip Lash; when using the cord he swings the plug which can be used to grab surfaces and items or to attack enemies. By attaching the plug to orange surfaces on walls and ceilings, Chibi can swing or grapple with his cord to reach inaccessible places. The Whip Lash can also be performed in the air; holding the action can cause the player to briefly hover. The cord's other main function is Zip Lash, in which Chibi-Robo charges up and releases the cord at a distance and ricochets of wall; Zip Lash is used for puzzle solving and reaching high-up, inaccessible locations.

In every level, the player can collect orbs known as Boost-Balls, which are either red or blue and extend the cord; the red orbs extend Whip Lash and blue orbs extend Zip Lash. The cord's length is reset when the player completes the level. Chibi-Robo is dependent on watts, a type of power supply. Besides the plug, Chibi-Robo can also perform a roll to travel through narrow passages. While playing levels, Chibi-Robo's battery life is depleted, causing the player to restart the level if it reaches 0. The player is required to recharge the battery using plug sockets that are scattered around the levels.

=== Abilities ===
In addition to standard plug sockets, some levels include sockets that give Chibi-Robo elemental abilities. Red sockets allow Chibi-Robo to melt obstacles and enemies with fire and blue sockets give him the ability to freeze enemies and freeze water. Other levels grant Chibi-Robo access to vehicles the player can control through a large, automated section of levels, such as a wakeboard, a skateboard and a submarine. To help Chibi-Robo when in trouble, the player can buy a spare battery that refills the player's battery and an emergency rocket that can save the player from a bottomless pit. These items are automatically activated an can be purchased in either the Chibi-House or in vending machines found within the levels. The Chibi-Robo amiibo figure can be used within any level that grants the player "Super Chibi-Robo", a powered-up version of Chibi-Robo that has an increased battery life and maximum power-cord length.

=== Setting and collectables ===
In Zip Lash, the player traverses seven worlds that are represented as Oceania, North Africa, the Caribbean, Europe, North America, the South Pole, and Asia. Each world, excluding Asia, contains six levels and a boss battle. The levels are displayed in a ring on a 2D map; the player can navigate between them via Chibi-Robo's spaceship, which is called the Chibi-House and acts as the game's hub world. The Chibi-House also allows players to purchase helpful, in-level items. The Chibi-House can also be used to increase Chibi-Robo's watts supply. By collecting trash that appears in levels and returning it to the Chibi-House, the player can convert the trash into watts, which can power plug sockets in levels. The Chibi-Robo amiibo can be used in the Chibi-House, allowing the player to unlock a toy capsule machine. The player can spend in-game currency to purchase collectable figurines.

At the end of each level, the player is tasked with hitting one of three UFOs that are colored bronze, silver, and gold. The color of the UFO determines the number of chances the player gets to spin the "Destination Wheel", which is the game's method of level progression. The player must spin a roulette wheel to see their next destination. Players can purchase new tiles with coins found in the level to replace some of the coins on the wheel so the player can rig the wheel to be more favorable. Once the player completes all six side-scrolling levels, the world's boss battle opens up and the wheel determines the difficulty of the boss.

Small, gold coins called Moolah act as the in-game currency. Levels contain collectibles: Chibi-Tots are small versions of Chibi-Robo that try to avoid the player; Big Coins are large versions of Moolah; and snacks that resemble real-world, international brands such as Utz Chips, Pocky, and Mentos. Snacks can be traded for costumes when the player interacts with a toy, one of which appears in each world. Blue aliens that appear within completed levels require the player to return them to their UFO. If successful, the alien rewards the player with a Miiverse code for a costume for Chibi-Robo to wear.

== Plot ==
Chibi-Robo is cleaning the exterior of a space station when his companion Telly reminds him to take a break. During the break, Chibi-Robo watches television and discovers many of the Earth's natural resources have vanished because of invading aliens. The pair are suddenly disturbed by a cluster of aliens, who are known as Gyorians and are traveling toward Earth. Chibi-Robo and Telly set off in the "Chibi House" to combat the alien invasion. During the adventure, Chibi-Robo travels to locations across the Earth to reclaim the stolen natural resources and defeat the alien robots that guard their locations.

Chibi-Robo and Telly travel to Antarctica, where the aliens' mothership is located. Chibi-Robo destroys the mothership but a large, glowing ball escapes from the wreckage and heads toward a metropolitan city in Asia. The ball then changes into a large monster named "The Mega-Mech Menace" and starts to wreak havoc. To combat the monster, Telly and Chibi construct a giant named "Giga Chibi-Robo"; the two giants fight each other until Chibi-Robo deactivates the monster and destroys it, prompting both Chibi and Telly to return to the station.

== Development ==
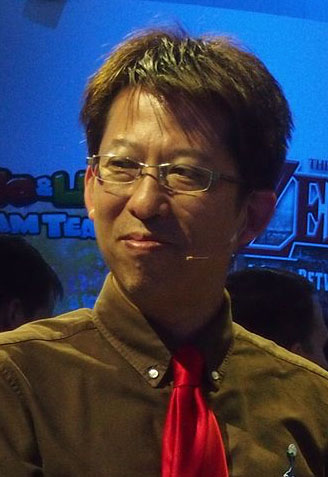
Kensuke Tanabe, producer of the Chibi-Robo! series since its creation

Chibi-Robo! Zip Lash, the fifth game in the Chibi-Robo series, was developed by Skip Ltd. with help from Vanpool, Inc. Series producers Kensuke Tanabe and Hiroshi Suzuki, and series newcomer Taro Kudo produced Zip Lash, and Risa Tabata was an assistant producer and chief director in the game. Keita Eto representing Skip Ltd. and Jun Tsuda, representing Vanpool directed the game. Tsuda had worked with Tanabe on Paper Mario: Sticker Star, Dillon's Rolling Western and its sequel. The game's lead designers include Yuki Watanabe and Shingo Kabaya, artist Akira Katsuta, and programmer Hironori Ahiko. Hirofumi Taniguchi is credited for being the game's sound lead; with Kiyoshi Hazemoto and Soshiro Hokkai also working on sound.

Following the inability to gain a wider audience with earlier Chibi-Robo! games, developers were tasked with making a new game that could make the series more popular in the US. In discussions with Skip Ltd., developers were tasked with focusing on action gameplay, suggesting "getting his cord and moving it over his head". The developers did not want the gameplay to revolve around jumping, as does the Super Mario series, and instead opted to focus on the cord-and-plug aspect of Chibi-Robo's design. To appeal to a wider audience, the developers decided to switch from 3D to 2D gameplay to implement the "whip and swing" mechanic suggested by Skip. Tabata stated to USGamer 3D gameplay would be more complex and they wanted the gameplay to be accessible to younger audiences. Developers did not want to make to make levels too difficult for players, while adding unique gameplay elements in each levels. In the same interview, Tabata said the "whip and swing" mechanic was developed around what the mechanic could do for the player, which led to the idea of ricocheting the cord. Speaking with Nintendo World Report at E3 2015, Tanabe stated they used other platforming games such as the Donkey Kong series as reference for judging terrain and level difficulty. Tabata also said Donkey Kong Country Returns and Tropical Freeze were used to influence camera movement in Zip Lash's levels.

Both Tanabe and Tabata have expressed interest in making new games for the Chibi-Robo! series; Tabata hoped to return to the adventure-type gameplay of earlier games in the series. In an interview with The Verge, Tanabe said if the game did not sell well, it would be the last entry of the series. According to Tanabe in 2015:

To be honest, this might be the last chance for us. I've continually thought about ways to build this into mainstream success, we've challenged ourselves in assorted ways along those lines, but I can't say that we've found the answer yet.

=== Characters and world design ===
Developers chose to portray the character Chibi-Robo as attractively as possible rather than creating a new character that could be commercially successful. The developers wanted to look at the role of Chibi-Robo from a "different perspective", with Chibi's role being on a much-larger scale than that of earlier games; Chibi is now saving the people of the world. The game was not created with a coherent series timeline in mind, opting instead to use Citrusoft, a company established in previous games, to tie Chibi into the world. However, they still wanted to keep some of the characteristics of Chibi-Robo, such as his role as a garbage cleaner. Throughout the game, Chibi interacts with a series of toys that appear within the levels. The toys were an idea of Skip Ltd., and were intended to move when people are not present; Toby, a toy airplane, was used to demonstrate the concept in the E3 demo.

The idea to include real-world snack brands in the game stemmed from a need to compare the size of Chibi-Robo with the world around him. The development team wanted to include another form of collectible in the game. Risa Tabata stated developers originally considered using landmarks such as the Statue of Liberty or the Pyramids as references but it was felt the landmarks would be too big in comparison with Chibi's size. Instead, developers chose to use snacks because they are common everywhere and would make people happy to see. Tanabe said a challenge of using snack brands was persuading companies to grant permission for the brand's use. For the US and European versions of the game, the respective branches of Nintendo contacted to the companies. For the Japanese version, however, Tabata was solely responsible for getting permission from more than thirty companies across the country.

=== Promotion and release ===
The game's first official announcement was made during an online presentation called "Nintendo Direct Micro", an edition of Nintendo Direct that was streamed on June 1, 2015. (Note: Zip Lash was originally presented in a standard edition of Nintendo Direct in Japan the day before.) The game was scheduled for release in October that year and was announced alongside an accompanying amiibo. Zip Lash was later featured in Nintendo's "Digital Event" presentation for E3 2015 and a playable demo was available at Nintendo's E3 booth. The game was launched in Japan on October 8, 2015, and in North America the following day. A demo was released in Europe later that month, and the full game was released in Europe on November 6.

Tabata stated the developers wanted to create an amiibo figure that would match the game. They aimed to make the figure appear within the game and to provide the ability to save the figure's data, allowing players to build it as they wish. At the game's launch outside Japan, the Chibi-Robo amiibo could only be made available by bundling it with the game. In Japan at launch, and on November 30 in Europe and North America, the amiibo was sold separately and exclusively by Amazon. Fifty-six other Nintendo-released amiibo are compatible with the game.

== Reception ==
Reception

Aggregate scores
Aggregator	Score
GameRankings	60.27% (Note: Based on 33 reviews.)
Metacritic	59/100 (Note: Score based on 50 reviews)
OpenCritic	12% recommended (Note: Score based on 42 reviews)

Review scores
Publication	Score
Destructoid	5.5/10
Eurogamer	6/10
Game Informer	7/10
GameRevolution	3/5
GameSpot	4/10
IGN	5/10
Nintendo Life	6/10
Nintendo World Report	8/10
Pocket Gamer	2.5/5
Shacknews	7/10
The Guardian	3/5
USgamer	2.5/5
VentureBeat	73/100

According to review aggregator website Metacritic, Chibi-Robo! Zip Lash received "mixed reviews"; Metacritic rated it 59/100 based on 50 reviews. On OpenCritic, 12% of critics recommended the game based on 42 reviews. Most critics found the game to be underwhelming and forgettable. Nintendo Life described the game as "fun but unexciting", noting it was a solid platformer but was quite unmemorable compared to other games of the same genre.

Throughout the reviews, critics' views on the game's controls were mixed. Some reviewers said the Zip Lash mechanic is a good idea and worked well with most levels. Others said the controls are poor, unresponsive, slow, and underused. Mark Brown of Pocket Gamer wrote the controls of the whip, which uses the d-pad, feel uncooperative and sluggish, saying it "lacked the finesse of other grappling hook games like Umihara Kawase and Bionic Commando".

Most critics found problems with multiple gameplay elements; many derided the Destination Wheel, saying the idea was annoying and unneeded; according to Destructoid the idea is pointless and the game has forced replayability, calling the concept of the "Boss Wheel" an annoyance. The vehicles' pacing and respawning were criticized too, where reviewers described the gameplay as being slow and boring, and panned the sections for the lack of checkpoints that causes the entire section to be restarted. Game Informer's Jeff Cork said the vehicles have exaggerated momentum and awkward controls, and that they drag on for far too long.

Reviewers also criticized the levels, which many said have a unique style but are generic and bland, making the game forgettable. Many critics said the levels' range of difficulty is inconsistent; VentureBeat said the game has a ranging level quality. Some reviews said the game has underused the levels' surroundings and has "no real sense of scale" compared to Chibi-Robo's height. Eurogamer, however, said the game's platforming elements are pleasant and challenging enough for playing.

While the game's mechanics received mixed responses, critics such as Peter Brown from GameSpot said it has well-designed boss battles that are visually appealing and fun to fight. One of the most positive aspect of Zip Lash was Chibi-Robo himself. Critics said the robot's cute appeal is a big driving force for the game and helps make most boring experiences slightly more memorable. This was attributed to the amiibo figure as well, with Kotaku citing it as the best part of the game and describing the figure as "cute".

=== Sales ===
In Japan, more than 14,000 copies of Chibi-Robo! Zip Lash were sold at launch, placing it ninth in the country's video-game sales charts in its week of release. In the United Kingdom, it failed to appear in the top-40-selling 3DS games, being outsold by releases such as Mario Kart 7. Because of this, Thomas Whitehead of Nintendo Life assessed Zip Lash to be a commercial failure.

=== Legacy ===
Due to Chibi-Robo! Zip Lash's critical and commercial failure, it is considered the final game in the series; As of 2022, Skip Ltd. has not made any games since 2015. In August 2020, it was widely speculated the company had closed down, citing evidence such as a HTTP 403 error when opening the company website, the CEO's removal of the website from his Twitter profile, and new occupation of the company's building.

In January 2018, Nintendo tweeted a picture of "Fiery Chibi-Robo"; Chibi-Robo being depicted on fire. This led to speculation that a Nintendo Direct would follow and a new Chibi-Robo game was going to be announced. The following day, a "Nintendo Direct Mini" was released without mention of a new Chibi-Robo game. The image of "Fiery Chibi-Robo" has become a meme in the Nintendo community as representation of excitement for a Nintendo Direct.
