= Kensuke Tanabe =

Japanese video game developer

- 田邊 賢輔
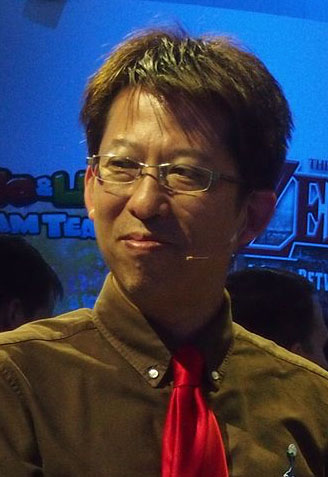
- Tanabe at E3 2013
- Born: January 26, 1963 (age 63); Ikeda, Osaka, Japan
- Education: Osaka University of Arts
- Occupations: Video game producer, designer
- Employer(s): Nintendo (1986–2026); Winning Entertainment Group (2026-present)
- Notable work: Super Mario; The Legend of Zelda; Metroid Prime; Chibi-Robo! Donkey Kong; Luigi's Mansion; Paper Mario
- Title: Manager at Nintendo SPD Production Group No. 3 (2004–2015); Manager at Nintendo EPD Production Group No. 6 (2015–2019); Senior Officer at Nintendo EPD (2019–2026); Chief Creative Officer at Winning Entertainment Group (2026-present)

Kensuke Tanabe (田邊 賢輔, Tanabe Kensuke; born January 26, 1963) is a Japanese video game producer and designer who has worked for Nintendo since 1986 until 2026 and is currently part of Winning Entertainment Group since August 2026.

== History ==
After he had graduated from the Visual Concept Planning Department of Osaka University of Arts, he decided to enter the video game industry, and joined Nintendo in April 1986.

At first, Tanabe was part of the Entertainment Analysis and Development division. He directed the platform games Yume Kōjō: Doki Doki Panic and Super Mario Bros. 2, and worked on the scripts for the action-adventures The Legend of Zelda: A Link to the Past and The Legend of Zelda: Link's Awakening. In 2003, Tanabe moved to the Software Planning and Development division, where he became the manager of Production Group No. 3. Since then, he has become a producer, and has managed and overseen the development of externally developed first party Nintendo video games, such as Metroid Prime, Donkey Kong Country, Paper Mario, Chibi-Robo and other series.

In 2019 he was promoted as Senior Officer at the division Nintendo EPD, continuing his work as producer alongside his division role.

In January 2026, Tanabe announced that Metroid Prime 4: Beyond was the last Nintendo game he would be working on, with a concurrent announcement confirming fellow producer Risa Tabata to be his successor.

In September 2026 it was confirmed by Tanabe's LinkedIn that he is now working as Chief Creative Officer (CCO) on Winning Entertainment Group since August of 2026.

== Ludography ==
Year	Game	Credit(s)
1987	Yume Kojo: Doki Doki Panic	Director, course design
1988	Super Mario Bros. 2	Director, course design
1988	Super Mario Bros. 3	Course design
1991	The Legend of Zelda: A Link to the Past	Scenario writer
1993	The Legend of Zelda: Link's Awakening	Scenario writer
1994	Stunt Race FX	Map design
1994	Kirby's Dream Course	Map design
1994	Donkey Kong Country	Additional support
1995	Kirby's Avalanche	Nintendo staff
1995	Kirby's Dream Land 2	Map design
1995	Kirby's Block Ball	Supervisor
1996	Super Mario RPG	Screenplay advisor
1996	Kirby Super Star	Advisor
1996	Star Wars: Shadows of the Empire	Japanese text translation
1996	BS Super Mario USA Power Challenge	Original design
1998	The Legend of Zelda: Ocarina of Time	Script Support
1999	Pokémon Snap	Supervisor
2000	Kirby 64: The Crystal Shards	Assistant manager
2001	Hamtaro: Ham-Hams Unite!	Advisor
2001	Super Mario Advance	Supervisor
2001	Magical Vacation	Advisor
2002	Cubivore: Survival of the Fittest	Supervisor
2002	Hamtaro: Ham-Ham Heartbreak	Advisor
2002	Eternal Darkness: Sanity's Requiem	Supervisor
2002	Metroid Prime	Co-producer
2003	GiFTPiA	Supervisor
2003	Hamtaro: Rainbow Rescue	Advisor
2004	Paper Mario: The Thousand-Year Door	Supervisor
2004	Metroid Prime 2: Echoes	Producer
2005	Star Fox: Assault	Project management
2005	Kirby: Canvas Curse	Producer
2005	Chibi-Robo!	Producer
2005	Geist	Producer
2005	Battalion Wars	Producer
2005	Metroid Prime Pinball	Producer
2005	Super Mario Strikers	Producer
2005	Tottoko Hamtaro Nazo Nazo Q Kumonoue no ? Jou	Producer
2006	Mother 3	Producer
2006	Magical Starsign	Producer
2006	Freshly-Picked Tingle's Rosy Rupeeland	Producer
2006	Mario vs. Donkey Kong 2: March of the Minis	Producer
2006	Custom Robo Arena	Producer
2006	Kirby: Squeak Squad	Producer
2006	Excite Truck	Producer
2006	Metroid Prime Hunters	Producer
2007	Super Paper Mario	Producer
2007	Mario Strikers Charged	Producer
2007	Chibi-Robo!: Park Patrol	Producer
2007	Theta	Producer
2007	Battalion Wars 2	Producer
2007	Metroid Prime 3: Corruption	Producer
2008	Super Smash Bros. Brawl	Producer
2008	Captain Rainbow	Producer
2008	Mystery Case Files: MillionHeir	Producer
2008	Kirby Super Star Ultra	Producer
2009	Picross 3D	Producer
2009	Picturebook Games: Pop-Up Pursuit	Producer
2009	Bonsai Barber	Producer
2009	Punch-Out!!	Producer
2009	Mario vs. Donkey Kong: Minis March Again!	Producer
2009	Okaeri! Chibi Robo! Happy Richie Dai Souji	Producer
2009	Irodzuki Tingle no Koi no Balloon Trip	Producer
2009	Rock N' Roll Climber	Producer
2009	Metroid Prime: Trilogy	Producer
2009	Art Academy	Producer
2009	Picturebook Games: The Royal Bluff	Producer
2009	Excitebike: World Rally	Producer
2009	Eco Shooter: Plant 530	Producer
2009	A Kappa's Trail	Producer
2009	Excitebots: Trick Racing	Producer
2010	Aura-Aura Climber	Associate producer
2010	Mario vs. Donkey Kong: Mini-Land Mayhem!	Producer
2010	Donkey Kong Country Returns	Producer
2011	Pilotwings Resort	Producer
2011	Mystery Case Files: The Malgrave Incident	Producer
2011	Kirby Mass Attack	Senior producer
2011	Freakyforms: Your Creations, Alive!	Producer
2011	Pushmo	Producer
2012	Kirby's Dream Collection	Producer
2012	Art Academy: Lessons for Everyone!	Producer
2012	Freakyforms Deluxe: Your Creations, Alive!	Producer
2012	Crashmo	Producer
2012	Dillon's Rolling Western	Producer
2012	Paper Mario: Sticker Star	Producer
2012	Sing Party	Producer
2013	Luigi's Mansion: Dark Moon	Special advisor
2013	Game & Wario	Directing support, game design
2013	Dillon's Rolling Western: The Last Ranger	Producer
2013	Mario and Donkey Kong: Minis on the Move	Producer
2013	Donkey Kong Country Returns 3D	Producer
2013	Chibi-Robo! Photo Finder	Producer
2014	Donkey Kong Country: Tropical Freeze	Producer
2015	Kirby and the Rainbow Curse	Producer
2015	Mario vs. Donkey Kong: Tipping Stars	Supervisor
2015	Chibi-Robo! Zip Lash	Producer
2015	Mario & Luigi: Paper Jam	Supervisor
2016	Mini Mario & Friends: Amiibo Challenge	Producer
2016	Metroid Prime: Federation Force	Producer
2016	Paper Mario: Color Splash	Producer
2018	Dillon's Dead-Heat Breakers	Producer
2018	WarioWare Gold	Producer
2018	Luigi's Mansion	Producer
2019	Luigi's Mansion 3	Producer
2020	Paper Mario: The Origami King	Producer
2021	WarioWare: Get It Together!	Producer
2022	Mario Strikers: Battle League	Producer
2023	Metroid Prime Remastered	Producer
2023	WarioWare: Move It!	Producer
2024	Luigi's Mansion 2 HD	Producer
2025	Donkey Kong Country Returns HD	Original game supervisor
2025	Metroid Prime 4: Beyond	Producer, scan text writer

Non-gaming credits

2021	Super Nintendo World	Creative director
