= Vanpool (company) =

Japanese video game developer

Vanpool, Inc.
- Native name: 株式会社バンプール
- Type: Private
- Industry: Video games
- Founded: 1999
- Defunct: May 31, 2023; 3 years ago
- Fate: Dissolved
- Headquarters: Shinjuku, Tokyo, Japan
- Products: See games
- Website: http://www.vanpool.co.jp/

Vanpool, Inc. was an independent Japanese video game, music software, computer software and toy developer. Its employees included Taro Kudo and Kazuyuki Kurashima, both of whom worked for the independent game developer Love-de-Lic. The company was primarily known for its work on the Dillon's Rolling Western and Kirby series. Vanpool shut down on May 31, 2023.

== Games ==
=== Games Developed ===
Year	Title	Publisher	Platform	Notes
2001	Endonesia	Enix	PlayStation 2	
2002	Coloball 2002	Enterbrain	PlayStation 2	
2006	Freshly-Picked Tingle's Rosy Rupeeland	Nintendo	Nintendo DS	
2007	I am a Fish	Kemco	Mobile phones	
2007	Let's Yoga	Konami	Nintendo DS	
2007	Let's Pilates	Konami	Nintendo DS	
2009	Dekisugi Tingle Pack	Nintendo	Nintendo DS (DSiWare)	
2009	Irozuki Tingle no Koi no Balloon Trip	Nintendo	Nintendo DS	
2011	Wii Play: Motion	Nintendo	Wii	Wind Runner Mini-game
2012	Dillon's Rolling Western	Nintendo	Nintendo 3DS	
2013	Dillon's Rolling Western: The Last Ranger	Nintendo	Nintendo 3DS	
2015	Chibi-Robo! Zip Lash	Nintendo	Nintendo 3DS	Co-developed with Skip Ltd.
2018	Dillon's Dead-Heat Breakers	Nintendo	Nintendo 3DS	
2019	Super Kirby Clash	Nintendo	Nintendo Switch	Co-developed with HAL Laboratory
2020	Kirby Fighters 2	Nintendo	Nintendo Switch	Co-developed with HAL Laboratory
2023	Kirby's Return to Dream Land Deluxe	Nintendo	Nintendo Switch	Co-developed with HAL Laboratory

=== Development Assistance ===
Year	Title	Developer	Publisher	Platform	Notes
2003	Mario & Luigi: Superstar Saga	AlphaDream	Nintendo	Game Boy Advance	Mini-Games
2005	Red Ninja: End of Honor	Tranji Studios	Vivendi Universal Games	PlayStation 2	Music
2008	Magician's Quest: Mysterious Times	Aquria	Konami	Nintendo DS	Music
2009	3°C	COOL&WARM Inc.	Kemco	Wii (WiiWare)	Music
2009	Little King's Story	Cing/Town Factory	Marvelous Entertainment	Wii	Sound/Voice Clips
2009	PostPet DS	AlphaDream	Marvelous Entertainment	Nintendo DS	Music
2010	Livly Garden	Brownie Brown	Marvelous Entertainment	Nintendo DS	Music
2012	Paper Mario: Sticker Star	Intelligent Systems	Nintendo	Nintendo 3DS	Direction and script
2022	Kirby and the Forgotten Land	HAL Laboratory	Nintendo	Nintendo Switch	Background modeling and programming assistance
