= Endonesia =

2001 video game

- Japanese box art
- Developer: Vanpool
- Publisher: Enix
- Designer: Taro Kudou
- Artist: Kazuyuki Kurashima
- Composer: Hirofumi Taniguchi
- Platform: PlayStation 2
- Release: JP: May 31, 2001
- Genre: Adventure
- Mode: Single-player

Endonesia (Note: Japanese: エンドネシア) is an adventure video game developed by Vanpool and published by Enix for the PlayStation 2. It was released only in Japan on May 31, 2001. It is Vanpool's debut game.

== Gameplay ==
The player takes on the role of a 5th-grade boy who is accidentally warped to a fictional island called Endonesia. The protagonist must communicate with the island's 50 sealed gods in order to return home. The boy does so by obtaining several abilities called Emo powers, which draw on his emotions, and the emotions of those around him. The game features day and night cycles as well as days of the week, with the island stuck in a 10-day time loop.

== Development ==
Endonesia was developed by Vanpool, which is composed of former members of Love-de-Lic. The game's instruction manual was made similar to a travel pamphlet. Titled Endonesia Airlines, it includes a map, photographs of food and wildlife from the game, and a letter of welcome to the island.

== Release and reception ==
Reception

Review score
Publication	Score
Famitsu	9/10, 8/10, 8/10, 7/10

Endonesia was released in Japan for the PlayStation 2 on May 31, 2001. It sold 9,757 copies during its first week of sale in Japan.

== See also ==
- List of PlayStation 2 games
