= Freakyforms: Your Creations, Alive! =

Video game for the Nintendo 3DS

- Retail packaging artwork for Freakyforms Deluxe, released for PAL region territories.
- Developer: Asobism
- Publisher: Nintendo
- Director: Hiroshi Moriyama
- Producer: Kensuke Tanabe
- Composer: Kohei Matsuoka
- Platform: Nintendo 3DS
- Release: JP: September 7, 2011; WW: November 10, 2011; Deluxe Edition: EU: July 28, 2012; AU: September 13, 2012; NA: November 5, 2012; Nintendo eShop: EU: August 17, 2012; AU: September 13, 2012; NA: November 5, 2012; JP: April 10, 2013
- Genre: Simulation
- Modes: Single player, multiplayer (Deluxe edition only)

Freakyforms: Your Creations, Alive! (Note: known in Japan as Ikimono Zukuri: Crea-toy (いきものづくり クリエイトーイ, Ikimono Zukuri: Kurieitōi)) is a video game developed by Asobism and published by Nintendo for the Nintendo 3DS handheld system. Released via the Nintendo eShop store in 2011, Freakyforms lets players create their own characters, named "Formees", for use in the game.

An expanded edition, Freakyforms Deluxe: Your Creations, Alive!, was released in 2012 both digitally and in retail. The game received generally mixed reviews from critics.

== Gameplay ==
Screenshot of a blue bear Formee, in the creating room.

In Freakyforms, players must first create an on-screen character, known as a "Formee". Formees are created using various shapes placed however the player decides. After the character is completed, players use the touch screen to navigate the Formee throughout the game world. As the player explores, they are asked to complete assigned tasks within a given time limit, such as collecting a number of items, eating certain items or assisting other characters. With continued play, additional features are unlocked, such as using the handheld's augmented reality features to take pictures of their creations in a real-world setting. Users may share their Freakyforms content by using the Nintendo 3DS system's StreetPass feature or by creating QR codes that can be scanned using the system's outer cameras.

== Deluxe edition ==
An enhanced retail version of the game titled Freakyforms Deluxe: Your Creations, Alive! launched in Europe on July 28, 2012, and in North America on November 5, 2012. This new version adds features such as the multiplayer mode where players make Formees together and explore dungeons. The software was released as a digital download on Nintendo eShop in Europe on August 17 and in Australia on September 13, while the original Freakyforms software was removed the day before. The original game was also replaced with the Deluxe edition in the North American eShop on the day the Deluxe edition was released. The game was also released in Japan as a Nintendo eShop-only game (Note: Ōmori! Ikimono Zukuri: Crea-toy (大盛り！ いきものづくり クリエイトーイ, Ōmori! Ikimono Zukuri: Kurieitōi)) on April 10, 2013, while the original Freakyforms software was removed the day before.

== Reception ==
=== Freakyforms: Your Creations, Alive! ===
Freakyforms: Your Creations, Alive!

Aggregate score
Aggregator	Score
Metacritic	68/100

Review scores
Publication	Score
Edge	6/10
GamePro	3/5
GamesMaster	66%
IGN	6/10
Jeuxvideo.com	14/20
NGamer	70%
Nintendo Life	7/10
Nintendo World Report	8.5/10
Official Nintendo Magazine	89%
Pocket Gamer	3.5/5

The original Freakyforms received "average" reviews according to the review aggregation website Metacritic. Lucas Thomas of IGN said that while the game's creation functions are "fairly well done", the developers then "surrounded it with this weird, tossed-together collection of desperate ideas that don't ever really feel like a cohesive game." In Nintendo Life's review, Thomas Whitehead said Freakyforms was "a title that can give hours of childish pleasure", even though "repetitive exploration segments and control issues are negatives for anyone."

=== Freakyforms Deluxe ===
Freakyforms Deluxe: Your Creations, Alive!

Aggregate score
Aggregator	Score
Metacritic	63/100

Review scores
Publication	Score
Gamekult	4/10
GamesMaster	65%
GamesTM	7/10
IGN	5/10
Jeuxvideo.com	11/20
NGamer	65%
Nintendo Life	7/10
Nintendo Power	6/10
Official Nintendo Magazine	80%
Pocket Gamer	3/5
Metro	5/10

Freakyforms Deluxe received a bit more mixed reviews than the original according to Metacritic.
