= Let's Yoga =

2007 video game

- North American version cover art
- Developer: Vanpool
- Publisher: Konami
- Platform: Nintendo DS
- Release: JP: July 5, 2007; EU: November 16, 2007; NA: April 29, 2008
- Genre: Fitness game
- Mode: Single-player

Let's Yoga (どこでもヨガ, Doko Demo Yoga) is a fitness video game developed by Vanpool and published by Konami for the Nintendo DS. It was released in Japan on July 5, 2007, Europe on November 16, 2007, and in North America on April 29, 2008.

Let's Yoga features 25 main yoga lessons for the user to complete, and functions as an interactive yoga workout guide for the player. The game was released concurrently with Let's Pilates, a game also developed by Vanpool. It has received a 76.67% from GameRankings.

== Gameplay ==
The game demonstrates a pose on the upper screen while the lower screen allows the player to pause the demonstration at any time.

The player begins by creating a profile for the game, after which the player is given basic information and background about Yoga. The game then unlocks the first set of workouts for the player; in an effort to keep players at yoga levels equivalent to their abilities, the game asks the player to self-judge whether they are ready to progress to the more difficult yoga poses based on user-submitted results. Let's Yoga includes options for shorter sets of yoga poses if the player lacks the time to do the main longer sessions. The game also includes yoga poses to complete in office chairs during times the player might be restricted to a desk.

When the player selects a Yoga pose, the game offers voice and video instructions to the player to direct their pose. The game does not offer a preview of the selected yoga pose before starting. The game requires the player to enter in information about their completed exercises as the game has no way of measuring whether the user actually completed the exercises or not.

== Reception ==
Let's Yoga received mostly positive reviews from critics, who were impressed by its detailed yoga instructions; the game received a 76.67% from review aggregate site GameRankings.

IGN's Daemond Hatfield stated that the game would appeal to those who already had experience with Yoga as the game lacked traditional game mechanics. PALGN's Evan felt that the game was an outstanding complement to Wii Fit, although he noted that it "... isn't going to appeal to everyone."
