= Coloball 2002 =

2002 video game

- Developer(s): Vanpool
- Publisher(s): Enterbrain
- Artist(s): Kazuyuki Kurashima
- Composer(s): Hirofumi Taniguchi, Masanoff Adachi
- Platform(s): PlayStation 2
- Release: JP: June 27, 2002
- Genre(s): Turn-based strategy
- Mode(s): Single-player, multiplayer

Coloball 2002 (Note: Japanese: コロボール2002, Hepburn: Corobaru 2002) is a turn-based strategy role-playing video game for the PlayStation 2. The game was developed by Vanpool and published by Enterbrain exclusively in Japan on June 27, 2002. The title Coloball is short for "Colosseum Ball," and although the game is touted as a sports adventure game, it is most similar to an RPG board game.
