= Axelay =

1992 video game

- North American box art
- Developer: Konami
- Publisher: Konami
- Producer: Kazumi Kitaue
- Designer: Noritoshi Kodama
- Programmer: Hideo Ueda
- Artist: Kazuhiro Namba
- Composer: Taro Kudo
- Platform: Super NES
- Release: JP: 11 September 1992; NA: September 1992; EU: 30 September 1993
- Genre: Scrolling shooter
- Mode: Single-player

Axelay (Note: Japanese: アクスレイ, Hepburn: Akusurei) is a 1992 scrolling shooter developed and published by Konami for the Super Nintendo Entertainment System. Set in the fictional solar system Illis where an alien empire known as "Armada of Annihilation" invades its planets including the Earth-like Corliss (Mother), players take control of the titular D117B space fighter craft as a last resort to stop the alien invasion by recovering its lost weaponry. The gameplay mainly consist of both vertical-scrolling and horizontal-scrolling stages in the same vein as Konami's own Life Force, with players choosing three different weapon-types that increase in number as they progress through the game.

Headed by Super Castlevania IV producer Kazumi Kitaue, Axelay was developed by most of the same team that would later go on to form Treasure, the creators of Gunstar Heroes. It is regarded by publications as a classic of the shoot 'em up genre, garnering praise for its visuals, music and an advanced selection of weapons available at the time.

The game has since been re-released through download services for Nintendo consoles. A sequel, Axelay 2, was planned but never materialized.

== Gameplay ==

Top: Vertical gameplay
Bottom: Horizontal gameplay

Axelay is a scrolling shooter similar to Konami's own Life Force where players take control of the D117B space fighter craft as a last resort to stop the Armada of Annihilation by recovering its lost weaponry through six stages, each with a boss at the end that must be fought before progressing any further. The gameplay varies quite a bit from that of traditional 2D scrolling shooters. Rather than collecting weapon power-up items from defeated enemies in order to obtain more advanced weapons, players earns new weapons as they advance in the game instead. There are three weapon types with which the fighter is outfitted at the start of a stage: a standard weapon, a special weapon and a bomb or missile. Players may freely switch between each of these weapon types during a level. At the end of each level, a new choice of one of these types of weapons is added to the ship's armory and players are given the ability to modify their fighter to suit the needs of the next level. Examples of weapons include multiple-way shot, vulkan cannon, and spread bombs. Similar to Life Force, levels transition between vertical and horizontal scrolling layouts, forcing the player to select weapons that will be most effective for each level.

Each selectable weapon in Axelay also operate like shields. The game eschews the standard one-hit-kill model prevalent in space shooters, instead simply disabling the currently selected weapon and reducing the player to a weak default version of that weapon type. Sustaining a second hit while using a weakened weapon will destroy the player's ship. However, directly colliding into an enemy will still destroy the ship instantly. The title uses various visual effects in both the top-down and side-scrolling stages. In the top-down stages, enemies and objects are warped as they come into view to produce a pseudo-3D effect, in addition to parallax scrolling effects.

Axelay uses a respawn system where their ship immediately starts at the location they died at. Getting hit by enemy fire or colliding against solid stage obstacles will result in losing a life and once all lives are lost, the game is over though players have the option to continue playing via a limited number of credits. Although there is an ending, the game loops back to the first stage after completing the last stage, with each one increasing the difficulty and enemies fire denser bullet patterns.

== Plot ==
The plot of Axelay varies between regions. The game takes place in the fictional planetary system known as Illis. Once a peaceful system, it was invaded by an alien empire known as the Armada of Annihilation, taking over the planets of the Illis system including the Earth-like Corliss (Mother in the Japanese version). As a last resort against the alien forces, the D117B fighter is sent out to recover its lost weaponry and put a stop to the invasion. Having traversed the cloud covered Cumuluses, the space colony Tralieb, the largely populated Urbanite, the watery Cavern, and Sector 3 Lava Planet, the Axelay D117B fighter makes its way to the fortress of Armada of Annihilation and completes its mission.

== Development and release ==
Axelay was designed by a group of Konami employees that would later go on to found Treasure, the creators of Gunstar Heroes. Kazumi "Mr." Kitaue served as producer with Hideo "Dreamer" Ueda, S. Tamate and Kazuhiko "König" Ishida serving as programmers. Tsunenari "Boncharu" Yada and "Furiten" Nagisa Tsuchiya acted as designers with Toshiharu Furukawa and M. "Kagenin Sasaki" Suzuki gave additional support during development, while artist Kazuhiro "PD." Namba created the pixel art. Former Konami Kukeiha Club composer Taro Kudo scored the soundtrack, however the music for the second stage boss ("Cosmic Dance!") was remixed by Masanori "M.C." Adachi and the ending music was composed by Akira "AKI" Souji, though Souji is not credited as such in the game. Other people also collaborated in its development. Ueda stated that one of the enemies in the last stage previously appeared in other shoot 'em up games by Konami such as Life Force and MX5000, as his then-president at Konami liked the enemy's attack.

Axelay was first released in Japan by Konami on 11 September 1992. The game was originally intended to be a Japanese exclusive but was given an international release in response to numerous letters from consumers and critics. Later in that month it was released in North America and the following year in Europe. The North American cover art was illustrated by Tom Dubois. The soundtrack was released on a single 22-song disc published by King Records on 21 October 1992, while the tracks "Unkai" and "Colony" were included on the Konami All Stars 1993 and the Perfect Selection Konami Shooting Battle II compilation discs respectively. The title was re-released on the Wii's Virtual Console service in Australia and North America in 2007 and later in Japan in 2008. It has since been re-released for the Wii U's eShop service across all regions in 2015.

== Reception ==
Reception

Aggregate score
Aggregator	Score
GameRankings	81.14%

Review scores
Publication	Score
AllGame	4.5/5
Electronic Gaming Monthly	9/10, 9/10, 9/10, 8/10
Famitsu	7/10, 4/10, 6/10, 6/10
GamesMaster	80%
Nintendo Power	3.775/5
Official Nintendo Magazine	92%
Super Play	85%
Total!	(UK) 81%, (DE) 2-
Bad Influence!	93%
Control	77%, 84%
Electronic Games	81%
N-Force	93%
Nintendo Game Zone	91/100
SNES Force	90%
Super Action	91%
The Super Famicom	75/100
Super Gamer	91%
Super Pro	91/100

According to Famitsu, Axelay sold 2,482 copies in its first week on the market and 4,625 copies during its lifetime in Japan. The Japanese publication Micom BASIC Magazine ranked the game fourteenth in popularity in its December 1992 issue, and it received a 22.79/30 score in a 1993 readers' poll conducted by Super Famicom Magazine, ranking among Super Famicom titles at the number 50 spot. Its visual effects combined with what was then seen as an advanced selection of weapons available, as well as the music score, made Axelay into a popular shooter for the SNES. The game received generally favorable reception from critics, holding a rating of 81.14% based on seven reviews according to review aggregator GameRankings. GamePro's Dr. Dave praised the game's inventive weapons, range of challenge for players of differing abilities, and the fact that the player starts the game already with three fully charged weapons. Nintendo Power praised the game's graphics but noted that its head-on perspective takes time getting used to.

=== Accolades ===
Axelay is considered by some publications as a classic of its genre. Super Play listed it number 36 on its list of the top 100 SNES games of all time in 1996. The following year, it was listed as number 91 on Electronic Gaming Monthly's 100 best games of all time in their 100th issue, which cited its Mode 7 effects, the boss visuals, and the strategy involved in choosing the weapons loadout before each level. The website ScrewAttack called it the #6 best 2D shooter. Nintendo Power magazine later called it the #18 best game on the SNES. Axelay was included as one of the titles in the 2010 book 1001 Video Games You Must Play Before You Die. In 1995, Total! ranked Axelay 88th on their "Top 100 SNES Games." IGN rated Axelay 55th in its Top 100 SNES Games. They praised the game calling it "A visual stunner on the SNES" and felt that the unique application of the Mode 7 made Axelay feel like two games in one.

=== Retrospective reviews ===
Retrospective assessments

Review scores
Publication	Score
GameSpot	(Wii) 7.5 / 10
IGN	(Wii) 7.5 / 10
Nintendo Life	(Wii)
USgamer	(Wii U) 4 / 5

Retrospective reviewers praised the game as well. Both IGN and GameSpot gave the Virtual Console re-release of Axelay a 7.5 out of 10. Nintendo Life gave the game a score of 80 out of 100.

== Legacy ==
After finishing Axelay two times consecutively on the highest difficulty level, a message promising Axelay 2 appeared but the planned sequel never materialized due to low sales of the first game. The Axelay D117B fighter makes an appearance in Konami's Airforce Delta Strike as an unlockable aircraft.
