= Freshly-Picked Tingle's Rosy Rupeeland =

2006 video game

Freshly-Picked: Tingle's Rosy Rupeeland
- European box art
- Developer: Vanpool
- Publisher: Nintendo
- Director: Taro Kudo
- Producer: Kensuke Tanabe
- Composer: Masanori Adachi
- Series: The Legend of Zelda
- Platform: Nintendo DS
- Release: JP: September 2, 2006; EU: September 14, 2007
- Genre: Adventure
- Mode: Single-player

Freshly-Picked: Tingle's Rosy Rupeeland (Note: Japanese: もぎたてチンクルのばら色ルッピーランド, Hepburn: Mogitate Chinkuru no Barairo Ruppīrando) is a 2006 adventure game developed by Vanpool and published by Nintendo for the Nintendo DS. It stars Tingle, a character who has appeared in several games in The Legend of Zelda series starting from Majora's Mask for the Nintendo 64.

Freshly-Picked Tingle's Rosy Rupeeland was released in Japan in September 2006, and in Europe in September 2007. It was commercially successful in Japan, selling 234,862 units by the end of 2007.

== Gameplay ==
Screenshot of gameplay. The Nintendo DS's dual screens are often used to display a tall view of an area, combining the two screens to display one image.

The objective of Freshly-Picked: Tingle's Rosy Rupeeland is to continually build up a tower found under a spring to the west of Tingle's house. To do this, the player must feed Rupees into the tower. Subsequent gameplay is built upon finding as much money as possible, but also mixed with traditional The Legend of Zelda dungeon adventuring and puzzle elements. Among this, however, is a shallow bargaining system for interacting with non-player characters (NPCs), as items and information must be bought via offering what the player thinks is a suitable price. If the price is too low, the player may not receive anything, but if the price offered is too high they may be needlessly spending too much.

Dungeons within Tingle's Rosy Rupeeland are found on each of the game's three continents, and are a necessity to complete the game. By completing a dungeon, the player receives what are typically the biggest Rupee rewards and by defeating the end-of-dungeon bosses they receive one of five gems. Even if the player has successfully built the tower to its tallest height, they must have collected all the gems to access the final location. Accessing these dungeons is limited by the height of the tower, as certain areas can only be accessed once the tower is a certain height, and thus after the player has donated enough Rupees into it.

Tingle can collect items along his journey, selling them later for profit or using them to aid support characters or other NPCs. Items can be mixed together to create different variations. These are made via the boiling pot in Tingle's home, where the player uses the stylus to stir the mixture. Other items can be used to decorate the top floor of Tingle's house, and completing the game allows the player to change Tingle's clothing.

Whenever the player enters a new location within Tingle's Rosy Rupeeland, the player will receive an incomplete map. By filling in and completing the map, via circling (with the stylus) points of interest which are not shown on it, the player can then show the map to an old woman in the nearby port town and receive a fixed sum of money. By selling the completed map, however, the player loses access to the map until they buy it back from the woman.

Although completing dungeons can be likened to that in The Legend of Zelda series, the combat is very different. Instead of having a large amount of direct input into the battles, within Tingle's Rosy Rupeeland the player engages an enemy, at which point both Tingle and the enemy character turn into a ball of dust as they fight. Then the player can either tap the screen to rally support for Tingle, or use the buttons to move the fight around the screen.

Although Tingle's Rupee count depletes as he fights with an enemy, successfully defeating one results in receiving Rupees and rare items. By engaging multiple enemies in battles by moving the dust cloud over them, the amount of rewards multiply, though Tingle loses more Rupees early on in the battle.

Furthermore, to assist Tingle in battles, the player can acquire bodyguards as support characters to help him in combat and dungeons. Bodyguards are found in "Bodyguard Salons", there are thirty of these characters in all, and they must be bargained with for them to help. These characters come in small, medium and large sizes, reflecting their combat abilities.

== Plot ==
Freshly-Picked Tingle's Rosy Rupeeland features three continents divided into eleven islands. Each island is themed differently and sometimes contains its own dungeon or else it has a central puzzle the player must complete.

The game follows an alone and lazy 35-year-old man's transformation into his green-clothed fairy persona. The story starts when one day a voice calls the main character (whose name is chosen by the player) from his home to a spring west of his house. There, Uncle Rupee, an old man with a Rupee-shaped head, appears and offers him a life in a paradise called Rupeeland if he continues to feed Rupees to the Western Pool: if enough Rupees are fed, the tower found under the pool will grow upwards towards the sky, and Tingle will be able to enter Rupeeland. He accepts the offer and Uncle Rupee transforms him so that Rupees become his source of life: in fact, if unfortunately he loses all the rupees without preserving even one, he will die; moreover, Uncle Rupee gives him the name "Tingle", making him forget his own.

As Tingle builds the tower and explores the various lands defeating enemies and bosses, it becomes increasingly clear that Uncle Rupee is motivated by a purely greedy and selfish intent, is appropriating all the money collected by Tingle and wants to have total domination on Rupeeland. After Tingle completes the last task, Uncle Rupee, now completely addicted to the power of the rupees and furious that Tingle won't give them to him anymore, engages in a fight against him.

After defeating Uncle Rupee there are two possible endings, and they depend on whether or not Tingle has collected all the Rupee Goods scattered across the various lands:

- Bad ending: Tingle doesn't find all the Rupee Goods and goes to Rupeeland, where he begins to live in the wildest luxury and idleness, becoming incredibly greedy and therefore not so different from Uncle Rupee.
- Good ending: Tingle finds all the Rupee Goods. Peace finally returns to the world and Tingle returns to his former life. Also, rupees start raining from the sky to the happiness of the people who collect them.

== Development ==
Freshly-Picked Tingle's Rosy Rupeeland was announced in October 2005 under the title Tingle RPG. It was later released on September 2, 2006 in Japan and in Europe on September 14, 2007. It was never released in North America.

== Reception ==
Reception

Aggregate score
Aggregator	Score
GameRankings	66.25% (16 reviews)

Freshly-Picked Tingle's Rosy Rupeeland has received mostly positive reviews from the few outlets which have reviewed it. Official Nintendo Magazine gave the game a score of 76%, praising the game's uniqueness, humour and "fantastically stylised graphics", but criticizing it for dull dungeon design and a poor battle system. Nintendo Life praised the game as well, noting the boss battles in particular to be surprising and exciting, though they noted that the game can start to wear after a while, as some aspects were "repetitive and/or annoying".

In its first week of release, it sold more than 45,000 units in Japan. It was the 57th best-selling game of 2006 in Japan, selling 207,525 units. It was the 478th best-selling game of 2007, selling 21,295 units in that year for a total of 234,862 units as of 2007. IGN ranked the cover art the scariest cover art in gaming.

== Legacy ==
Super Smash Bros. Brawl includes stickers based on artwork from the game, and the game itself is referenced in Tingle's trophy description. However, the game is referred to as "Tingle's Rupeeland". A sequel, Irodzuki Tingle no Koi no Balloon Trip, was released for the Nintendo DS in Japan.
