= Paper Mario: Color Splash =

2016 video game

- Developer: Intelligent Systems
- Publisher: Nintendo
- Directors: Naohiko Aoyama; Taro Kudo
- Producer: Kensuke Tanabe
- Designers: Yukio Morimoto; Shingo Igata
- Programmer: Junya Kadono
- Artists: Masahiko Nagaya; Hidemi Yamaguchi
- Writer: Taro Kudo
- Composers: Takeru Kanazaki; Shigemitsu Goto; Fumihiro Isobe
- Series: Paper Mario
- Platform: Wii U
- Release: NA/EU: October 7, 2016; AU: October 8, 2016; JP: October 13, 2016
- Genres: Action-adventure, role-playing
- Mode: Single-player

Paper Mario: Color Splash (Note: Known in Japan as Paper Mario Color Splash (Japanese: ペーパーマリオ カラースプラッシュ, Hepburn: Pēpā Mario: Karā Supurasshu)) is a 2016 role-playing video game developed by Intelligent Systems and published by Nintendo for the Wii U console. It is the fifth installment in the Paper Mario series, within the larger Mario franchise. The story follows Mario and his new ally, Huey, on a quest to save Prism Island and rescue Princess Peach from Bowser.

Color Splash contains elements of the action-adventure and role-playing (RPG) genres. Players control Mario as he traverses levels made to look like craft materials, reaching endpoints and retrieving each Big Paint Star through linear gameplay. Mario is equipped with a paint hammer, which is used to solve coloring-themed puzzles and collect awards in levels. In turn-based combat phases, Mario uses a selection of cards that endow him with attacks and other abilities.

Nintendo's vision for the Paper Mario series following Paper Mario: Sticker Star was to differentiate it from their other RPG Mario series, Mario & Luigi. The development team focused on puzzle-solving and comedic elements and, to make each game different from one another, emphasized an overarching gimmick. The paint theme was conceived by Atsushi Isano, the director for Intelligent Systems, and developed to take advantage of the Wii U GamePad. A card-based battle system was implemented to use the GamePad touchscreen to sort, paint, and flick cards. The artists focused on making the paper textures as realistic as possible.

Color Splash was announced via a Nintendo Direct in March 2016 and released worldwide in October 2016. Upon its announcement, it drew controversy for continuing an action-adventure and gimmick-oriented format introduced in Sticker Star. On release, however, it received praise for its graphics, soundtrack, comedic writing, and improved dialogue. Conversely, the combat system and its lack of RPG elements were criticized, much like its predecessor, although some critics cited improvements to its structure. The game was followed by Paper Mario: The Origami King for the Nintendo Switch in 2020.

== Gameplay ==
Paper Mario: Color Splash has elements of both action-adventure and role-playing genres. This follows the template established by the previous entry in the series, Paper Mario: Sticker Star. The player controls a two-dimensional version of Mario using the Wii U GamePad, and follows Mario as he explores a paper-craft world designed to look like craft materials. The main objective is to retrieve the missing six Big Paint Stars stolen by Bowser, all of which occupy a different portion of the world. Players traverse through a world map containing stages; the goal of each is to reach the Mini Paint Star at the end. Upon reaching a Mini Paint Star for the first time, the player unlocks access to new stages. Some stages contain multiple Mini Paint Stars.

Mario (center) strikes a colorless flower with his paint hammer. In the top left is a paint meter display, showing how much paint is available.

In these stages, Mario can collect items and coins, talk to non-player characters (NPC), and complete puzzles and platforming challenges. He can consult Huey, Mario's ally, for assistance. Mario is equipped with a paint hammer, which can fill in colorless spots found throughout the world. Upon filling in the spots, Mario is awarded items such as coins. The hammer uses Mario's supply of paint, which comes in red, blue, and yellow varieties, which can be obtained by striking objects with the hammer. The type of area the player is filling in determines the color and amount of paint used. If the player collects "hammer scraps", they can increase the maximum amount of paint they can carry. Another ability, called the "cutout", allows Mario to reach otherwise inaccessible areas in stages. To use the ability, the player traces a dotted line on the GamePad's touchscreen, causing part of the environment to peel off, exposing secrets and new areas.

While exploring, the player will trigger a battle sequence when they encounter an enemy. Depending on how the player collided with the enemy, they will either deal or take damage immediately. The combat system in Color Splash is a turn-based battle system; the player's possible attacks are represented by cards the player can either collect from stages and defeated enemies, or purchase from shops with the in-game currency of coins. Cards can be used to attack enemies; they can also be painted to increase their strength. They range from basic jump and hammer attacks to "Thing" cards that resemble real-world objects, such as a fire extinguisher. The type of card determines the amount and color of paint to use, as well as how Mario attacks the enemy. The cards can also be used for defensive purposes, such as preventing some damage or healing Mario. Players choose, paint and sort cards with the GamePad's touchscreen. Enemy attacks will damage Mario, and the game is over once Mario loses all of his health. If the player defeats all the enemies in the encounter, the player returns to the stage and is rewarded with a random assortment of coins, cards, paint, and hammer scraps.

== Plot ==
Mario and Princess Peach receive a letter from Prism Island, which they discover is a Toad that was drained of its color and folded into a letter shape. They sail to Prism Island to investigate, where the three travelers find the island's town deserted, noticing colorless spots and objects. The fountain in the center of the island is dry, missing its famed Big Paint Stars. A vault appears in the fountain, containing a paint can. After Mario tries to open it, the can is revealed to be Huey, Prisma Fountain's guardian. Huey explains the fountain is usually powered by six Big Paint Stars, which supply the island with infinite paint and color. Mario agrees to help Huey recover the Big Paint Stars. While Mario further scouts the island, Peach is kidnapped by Bowser.

Mario traverses six areas to retrieve the Big Paint Stars while helping the local Toads. Mario also fights various enemies, including the Koopalings who serve as bosses. As Mario collects the Big Paint Stars, each one incrementally tells the duo about their memories of an attack on Port Prisma. Once Mario recovers all six Big Paint Stars, they learn that Bowser attempted to dye his shell a rainbow color using the Prisma Fountain but inadvertently mixed all the colors together, creating black paint, a toxic substance that possessed him and transformed him into "Black Bowser". He proceeded to summon his army to steal the Big Paint Stars and drain the color from Prism Island. The duo also discovers that Bowser was the one who sent them the color-drained Toad in order to coax them to come to Prism Island.

With the Big Paint Stars, and later joined by Luigi, the group reaches Black Bowser's Castle. Upon entering, they find that Bowser is mass-producing weaponized black paint in a factory, aiming to paint the world black. Mario and Huey then halt the factory's operations. The duo defeat Black Bowser, rescue Peach, and destroy the factory; that destruction causes the castle to fall apart in the process. Peach, Mario, and Luigi escape, but Huey stays to stop the black paint and absorbs the castle. Huey flies into space, taking the black paint far away from Prism Island, and then sacrificing himself in the process. In a post-credits scene, if the player has fulfilled certain requirements, Huey falls back into Prisma Fountain.

== Development ==
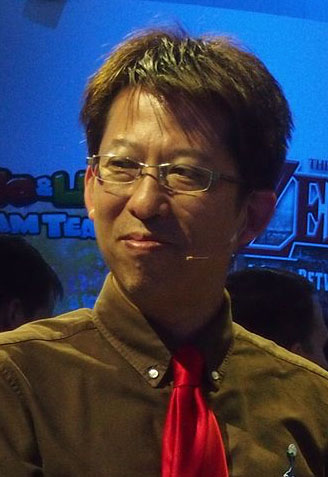
Kensuke Tanabe, the producer of the Paper Mario series since 2006

Paper Mario: Color Splash was developed by Nintendo and Intelligent Systems. Due to the poor reception of the previous game, Paper Mario: Sticker Star, Nintendo kept its negative feedback in mind during the development process. The focus of the Paper Mario series shifted toward the action-adventure genre with the introduction of Sticker Star, and Nintendo conceived the notion that the Mario & Luigi series would replace Paper Mario as the Mario franchise's RPG series. This was confirmed by co-producer Risa Tabata at E3 2016, in an interview with Kotaku's Stephen Totilio. She also noted how the Paper Mario series will focus more on "puzzle-solving [and] humor" over its gameplay elements. In addition to the genre shift, some gameplay elements were altered to address criticisms of the previous games. For example, the storyline added additional layers to improve its complexity by focusing on the relationship between Mario and his allies; the card system also had more depth via a larger inventory and a new hint system, due to critics expressing frustration with its extreme limitations in Sticker Star.

=== Design and characters ===
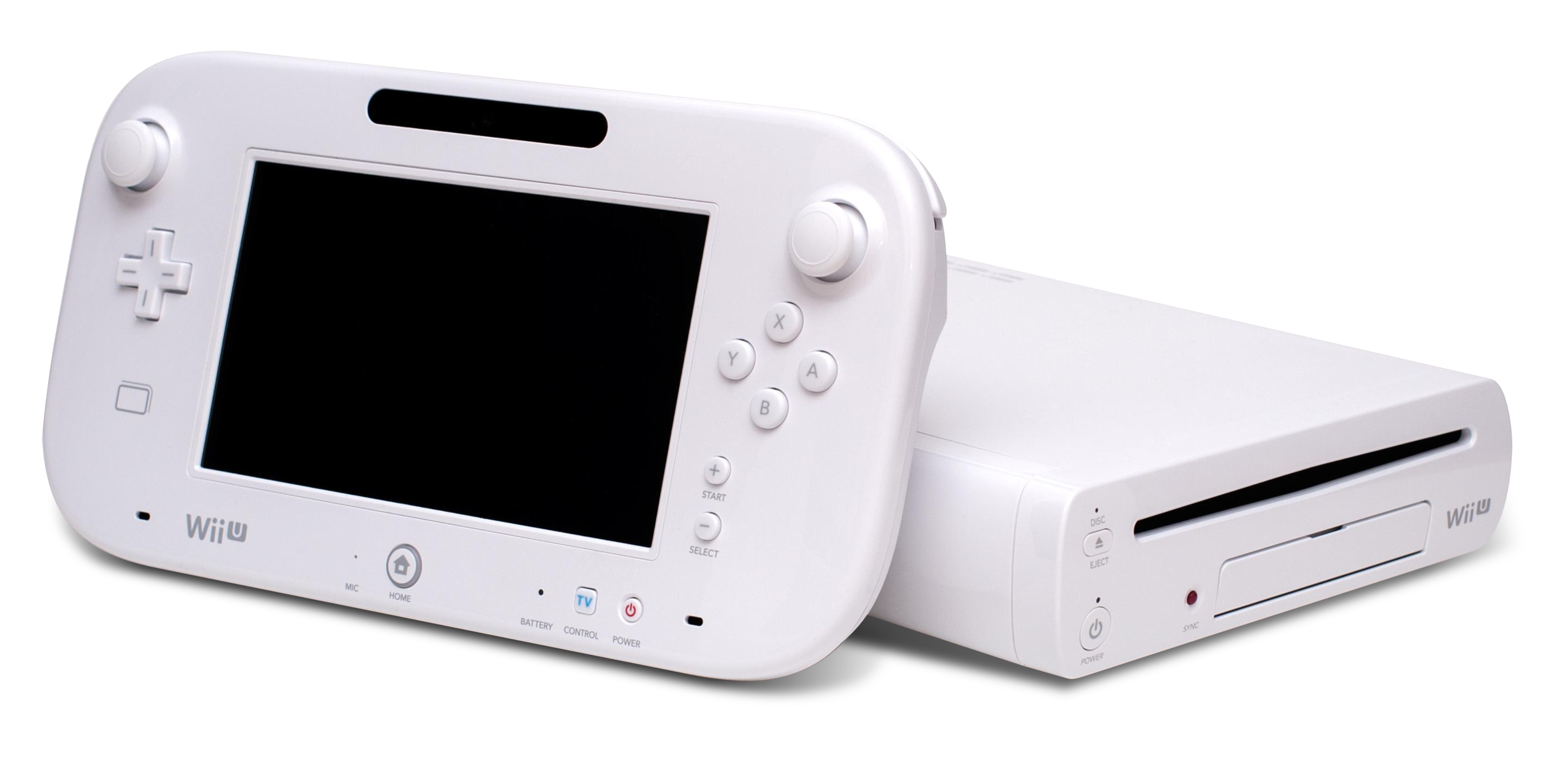
Color Splash was created to express new control experiences specific to the Wii U.

Producer Kensuke Tanabe explained that the idea of repainting the world originally came from director of production, Atsushi Ikuno, in 2012. Ikuno was inspired by watching his children having fun while painting, a new hobby they picked up. Ikuno told Tanabe about the story, and Tanabe pitched the idea to Intelligent Systems, the developers behind the Paper Mario series. According to Tanabe, a lot of trial and error was required before coloring with a hammer felt comfortable. Tabata explained that because the Wii U hardware was more powerful than previous Nintendo consoles such as the Nintendo 3DS, the artists were able to make realistic in-game paper. A paper-like art style was achieved by using different textures of paper for different environments; the staff purchased and reviewed different types of paper to determine which style expressed papercraft the most. Thing cards were created to create a visual distinction from the paper-like graphics, to be used for comedic effect.

"Mario is not an IP that I created. From the position of someone borrowing the IP, I think it's only natural to show respect to the person who created it, and let that feeling of respect guide us. So when Miyamoto-san, the father of Mario, asks us "could you make a game with only characters from the Mario family?", I think it's only natural for us to give it our best shot. In other words, we are not currently thinking about returning to old NPCs."

— Producer Kensuke Tanabe, Game Informer interview

The combat system was developed to take advantage of the unique controls on the Wii U touchscreen. With a larger touchscreen, it allowed the developers to implement the card-based battle system so it could be controlled directly from the screen; this was not possible in Sticker Star, as the 3DS's touchscreen was too small. A system where the player could sort through cards on the gamepad and fling them onto the screen using the touchscreen was also implemented; the development team found the use of player interaction to be entertaining. Tabata also explained that the amount of cards the player can hold were limited to make players think strategically. Multiplayer and Miiverse functionality were ultimately never considered. The game did not use a typical RPG system but instead focused on puzzle-solving, with most of the character upgrades focused on increased paint capacity. Overall, combat was designed to be an additional hindrance rather than one the game's main focal point, according to Tanabe.

Shigeru Miyamoto, the lead designer of the Mario franchise, insisted that only characters previously instated in the franchise should be used for the game, and no new ones would be used. Former Nintendo CEO Satoru Iwata suggested that the philosophy of development was to limit options to help bring out more creativity. This led the team to create various Toads with multiple color schemes to represent their different personalities. When creating characters, major emphasis went toward Toads and other familiar characters in the franchise, while still keeping variety and interest. According to Tabata, the character itself does not matter as long as their personality is adequately expressed through character dialog. Taro Kudo was the lead writer; Tabata expressed pride in Kudo's work, stating how he was good at coming up with jokes and story design. Tabata also noted that during playtesting "there really were people who cried at the end". Instead of translating the game from Japanese to English for release, most of the one-off jokes were re-written so they would make more sense and appeal to English markets.

== Release ==
Paper Mario: Color Splash was announced as a 2016 release during a Nintendo Direct presentation on March 3, 2016. Upon its reveal, Color Splash received negative reception from fans of the series, who criticized the game for its aesthetic similarities to Sticker Star and the decision to continue the action-adventure formula that Sticker Star introduced. Soon after the announcement of Color Splash, a petition on Change.org was created calling for the game's cancellation along with the Nintendo 3DS game Metroid Prime: Federation Force. Nick Pino of TechRadar called the petition "a frightening example of how quickly, and harshly, we judge games we know next to nothing about." Kate Gray, also from TechRadar, noticed the game seemed focused on collectibles rather than plot. Stephen Totilo of Kotaku believed the Paper Mario series was "in the midst of an identity crisis" and that it faced redundancy because it was one of two Mario role-playing series, the other being Mario & Luigi. When questioned about Color Splash's genre at E3 2016, Tabata reaffirmed that it was an action-adventure game and that Mario & Luigi will continue to fill the niche of Mario role-playing games.

The game was released worldwide on October 7, 2016, and was available for pre-purchase on the Nintendo eShop on September 22, 2016. However, it was quickly discovered that Nintendo of America had accidentally made the full game available two weeks before its intended launch date. Nintendo later pulled the pre-load option from the North American eShop, but people who downloaded the game were able to keep their copies. Color Splash sold 20,894 copies in its first week of release in Japan, and 37,093 copies the following month. By the end of 2017, Japanese sales totalled to 86,000.

== Reception ==
Reception

Aggregate scores
Aggregator	Score
Metacritic	76/100
OpenCritic	58% recommend

Review scores
Publication	Score
Famitsu	35/40
Game Informer	8.5/10
GameSpot	7/10
GamesRadar+	3.5/5
Giant Bomb	2/5
IGN	7.3/10
Nintendo Life	8/10
Polygon	6.5/10
USgamer	3.5/5
VentureBeat	90/100

=== Reviews ===
Paper Mario: Color Splash received "generally favorable reviews" according to review aggregator website Metacritic, scoring a 76/100 on the site. Fellow review aggregator OpenCritic assessed that the game received strong support, being recommended by 58% of critics. In Japan, four critics from Famitsu gave Color Splash a total score of 35 out of 40. The game was nominated for "Favorite Video Game" in the 2017 Kids' Choice Awards, but lost to Just Dance 2017.

Many critics appreciated the game's written dialogue and comedic moments. Game Informer's Ben Reeves commented that the game was full of "belly-laugh moments" that paired well with its obscure plot points. He felt the combination of these made certain moments in the game unforgettable. Nintendo Life's Conor McMahon considered the writing to be a major increase in quality in comparison to Sticker Star, saying that the "scenes and interactions brim with humour, charm and imagination, making it an absolute joy to discover new people and places as you progress." GamesRadar+ reviewer Alex Jones considered the writing one of Color Splash's redeeming qualities. Terry Schwartz of IGN called Huey "endearing" and became emotionally attached to the character as the game progressed. However, they felt the story was generic in comparison to previous Paper Mario games, and was reminiscent of a Super Mario plot instead of being a memorable narrative. The characters, specifically the use of Toads, had mixed reception; although Miguel Concepcion of GameSpot applauded the comedic dialogue given by the Toads and their varied personalities, Conversely, Dan Ryckert of Giant Bomb disliked how every character was a Toad, and their individual traits failed to keep them individually unique.

The game's graphics and papercraft worldbuilding received similar positive opinions. Miguel Concepcion noted how the transition to HD graphics made the paper-like visuals even more appealing than Sticker Star and praised the unique ways paper was used for worldbuilding elements, such as toilet paper and wrapping paper, and the interesting puzzle opportunities via overworld manipulation. Jones called the visuals of Color Splash "the purest distillation of the original Paper Mario style yet". They likened them to the Wii U games Yoshi's Woolly World and Kirby and the Rainbow Curse.

The use of the hammer and paint received generally positive comments. Ryckert enjoyed the use of the paint mechanic and had the urge to paint everything in each world to full completion, and although Concepcion found early levels of the game slow to progress due to the very limited amount of paint that the hammer could hold, the problem became redundant as paint storage increased. The Cutout ability, in comparison, was poorly received. Concepcion and Jones found the ability to be an unnecessary addition for only being used in out-of-the-way and tedious instances. Although Jason Hidalgo, writing for the Reno Gazette-Journal, found the new gameplay features to be a well-functioning and purposeful addition, they felt they would come off as too difficult to use for younger audiences.

In-game combat was heavily criticized, for reasons including its necessity and pacing among others. Reeves felt that the game fixed the limited feeling of available cards in comparison to the sticker gimmick that Sticker Star introduced, and how combat was simplistic yet strategic. and Jones saw a risk-reward concept in the format alongside tactical puzzle-solving. However, the latter found combat to be repetitive, and having to sort and select cards for every enemy encounter became incommodious and avoided battling enemies when possible. McMahon and VentureBeat's Dennis Scimecaen considered the battle difficulty to be too low and tedious to hold interest. Caty McCarthy of Polygon saw little reason to continue participating in combat after the first five hours of gameplay for similar reasons. Ryckert commented that "just about everything in Color Splash is instantly likable", but felt that the combat phases dragged down the experience. In a negative review, rating a 2/5, Ryckert considered the use of the Wii U GamePad clumsy, and overall an unnecessary gimmick. In addition, they found combat to be completely unnecessary altogether due to its circular nature. They noted how the player purchases cards with coins that can be used in battle, and combat rewards the player with more coins; "with that system in place, why would anyone ever want to encounter an enemy in the field?" Commenting on Thing cards, Jones and Scimecaen enjoyed how they brought a unique way of defeating enemies, although backtracking to find them became increasingly frustrating.

=== Retrospective ===
Much like Sticker Star reception, reviewers compared Color Splash negatively to the first games in the series, Paper Mario (2000) and The Thousand-Year Door (2004), due to the loss of RPG elements. Reeves decided that although the game is "almost unrecognizable as an RPG", it was still entertaining in its own right and should appeal well to old fans of the series. He, alongside McCarthy, also believed that some lost RPG mechanics, such as character growth via managing character levels and statistics in-battle, made completing battles feel less rewarding, and felt the urge to avoid battles entirely when possible. Schwartz believed that the game was an overwhelming improvement from Sticker Star, but its favoritism toward gimmicks still caused it to fall short of the old RPG-oriented Paper Mario games. USgamer analyzed Nintendo's decision of the genre change, and declared that "it's probably more a case of Nintendo just being Nintendo" who attempted to surprise the player audience instead of making similar games over and over. They still reminisced on old characters from the series in comparison to Huey, however, and called the new take on combat "more of a chore for players rather than a pleasure".

== See also ==
- Mario & Luigi: Paper Jam
- List of Mario role-playing games
