= Paper Mario: The Origami King =

2020 video game

- Developer: Intelligent Systems (Note: Additional work by Tose)
- Publisher: Nintendo
- Director: Masahiko Nagaya
- Producers: Kensuke Tanabe; Atsushi Ikuno
- Designers: Yukio Morimoto; Shingo Igata
- Programmer: Tadao Nakayama
- Artists: Isamu Kamikokuryo; Benoit Ferrière
- Writer: Taro Kudo
- Composers: Yoshito Sekigawa; Shoh Murakami; Yoshiaki Kimura; Hiroki Morishita; Fumihiro Isobe
- Series: Paper Mario
- Platform: Nintendo Switch
- Release: July 17, 2020
- Genres: Role-playing, action-adventure
- Mode: Single-player

Paper Mario: The Origami King (Note: Known in Japan as Paper Mario: Origami King (Japanese: ペーパーマリオ オリガミキング, Hepburn: Pēpā Mario: Origami Kingu)) is a 2020 role-playing video game developed by Intelligent Systems and published by Nintendo for the Nintendo Switch console. Following Paper Mario: Color Splash (2016), it is the sixth game in the Paper Mario series, which is part of the larger Mario franchise. The story follows Mario and his friends as he sets out on a journey to prevent the Mushroom Kingdom from being transformed into origami. To do so, Mario must free Princess Peach's castle from five decorative streamers that extend across the kingdom.

The Origami King features cross-genre gameplay, blending elements of action-adventure, role-playing (RPG), and puzzle games. Controlling Mario, the player explores a large overworld and fights enemies in a turn-based style that uses a ring-based puzzle system. In combat, enemies are scattered on a circle stylized like a dartboard separated into four rings and additional columns. The player can rotate the rings horizontally and vertically to organize the enemies into patterns that result in being able to clear them more quickly.

The Origami King's development team emphasized innovation to a greater extent than previous games in the series. Anticipating an inability to satisfy every fan, Intelligent Systems gravitated towards creating entirely new concepts. Origami and confetti were used as new variants of paper-themed concepts. The developers changed the traditional linear gameplay to an open world format and used enemies uninvolved with the Mario franchise. Nintendo intended to announce the game at E3 2020 as part of the 35th anniversary of Super Mario Bros. (1985), but due to the cancellation of the expo, the game was revealed separately from the anniversary celebrations.

The game received generally positive reviews, with critics praising its writing, design, characters, music, and game mechanics. However, it was criticized for straying from the series' original role-playing style, as well as its cast lacking original character designs that previous entries had. Reception of the combat system was mixed, with some praising its innovation and others faulting its lack of difficulty and purpose. The game had sold three million copies by September 2020, two months after release, making it the fastest-selling game in the series and also one of the best-selling games on the Nintendo Switch. The game was nominated for three awards and was listed among the best games of 2020 by multiple critics.

== Gameplay ==
The Origami King is a cross-genre video game, containing elements from action-adventure, RPG, and puzzle games. The player controls a two-dimensional paper version of Mario and explores a linear open world designed to look like paper and cardboard. The player's goal is to destroy five decorative origami streamers created by King Olly, the game's main antagonist. Throughout the game, the player sets out to follow each of five streamers, which occupy wide open areas for exploration. These areas contain puzzles the player will need to complete to proceed.

Along the way, Mario can collect coins used to purchase items for use in combat, and hidden treasures to display at a museum. Among these hidden collectibles are Toads, which are either folded into origami or creased and crumpled. Mario can interact with non-player characters, some of which will join the player's party temporarily and can assist Mario in combat or interact with obstacles in the overworld. In certain areas of the game, Mario can use an ability known as the "1000-Fold Arms", that can tear back parts of the paper environment to reveal secrets. Mario can fill holes in the environment using a bag of confetti.

The player rotates rings to line up the enemies. If done correctly, the player receives an attack bonus.

The player fights enemies using a turn-based battle system. When Mario encounters one or more enemies in the overworld, the game transitions to a battle screen. During battle, Mario stands at the center of a dartboard-like arena divided into four ring-shaped sections with 12 radial slots; each enemy occupies a different slot. At the start of the player's turn, they can slide the rings horizontally or vertically to position enemies so that several of them can be attacked at once. The player is allotted a limited amount of time and number of rotations. Once the player has finished shifting the enemies, they can attack with a hammer, which targets enemies in a two-by-two section of the grid adjacent to the center, or with boots, which target a one-by-four line of enemies. The player can use items with varying power to attack enemies, or increase their heart points. Their attack power is boosted during a turn if the number of enemies targeted is maximized. If the player needs additional help, any Toads Mario saves from being folded will either deal some damage or help with the puzzle by partially rotating the rings. The amount of help they provide varies based on how much money Mario gives them. Any remaining enemies will then attack Mario before the game switches back to the player's turn. If the player wins the battle, they are awarded coins.

Boss battles follow a similar pattern of ring-style combat but place the enemy in the center and Mario on the outside. Players can rotate the rings horizontally or vertically; arrows on the ground mark the path Mario is going to follow. Mario starts with the arrow placed in front of him and will follow the rings until reaching an endpoint, which are attack tiles or magic circle tiles. The player can activate battle tiles by passing over them, while magic circle tiles need to be activated by passing an "ON" tile. Additional items are scattered on vacant tiles, such as health points and coins. To defeat each boss, the player must follow specific rules. These vary depending upon the enemy Mario is fighting. For example, the Earth Vellumental has five exposed body parts, and Mario needs to attack each one and cause them to retract before being able to do major damage.

== Plot ==
Princess Peach invites Mario and Luigi to an Origami Festival near her castle in Toad Town, which has mysteriously been abandoned. When they enter Peach's Castle to find where everyone went, they discover that she has been turned into origami and brainwashed by King Olly, a sentient origami figure. Having met a similar fate, many of Bowser's minions have been transformed into origami enemies called Folded Soldiers. Bowser has been folded and stapled into a square. Mario rescues Olly's sister Olivia (who was imprisoned for her betrayal) and eventually Bowser, and the three attempt to escape. However, Olly wraps the castle in five multicolored streamers and rips it off its foundations, transporting it to a nearby volcano. Mario, Olivia, and Bowser barely escape but a streamer strikes them, causing them to separate. Landing in Whispering Woods, a forest near Toad Town, Mario and Olivia find many of the Toads have been folded into origami by the Folded Soldiers. They rescue Luigi, who sets off to find the key to Peach's Castle.

Mario and Olivia must follow and destroy each streamer until they reach the end. At the end of the red streamer, they discover Colored Pencils, a member of Olly's "Legion of Stationery", a group of six anthropomorphic office supplies working for him, five of which guard each streamer. The two head to unravel the blue streamer, and along the way, they meet an amnesiac Bob-omb without a fuse that Olivia nicknames Bobby. Celebratory fireworks are launched after they defeat Rubber Band and clear the blue streamer, causing Bobby to regain his memory.

The three head to Scorching Sandpaper Desert to unravel the yellow streamer but soon encounter Olly, who blocks the path with a giant boulder, trapping Olivia under it. To save her, Mario and Bobby travel to the ocean liner The Princess Peach, where Bobby retrieves an item which is later revealed to be a fuse. He lights it so he can sacrifice himself to destroy the boulder pinning Olivia. A distraught Olivia breaks down, but Mario is able to cheer her up.

After defeating Hole Punch, Tape, and Scissors, clearing the yellow, purple, and green streamers, they rescue Bowser from Scissors before the three head to Peach's Castle. Luigi returns, sadly claiming he could not find the key, but soon discovers that it was stuck in his kart. As they enter, Olly refolds Peach's Castle into the Origami Castle; the trio, excluding Luigi, traverse through it, defeating Stapler and returning Bowser to his original form.

The three confront King Olly, who reveals he has folded 999 paper cranes, one away from the 1,000 needed to grant him ultimate power to create his origami kingdom and turn all Toads into blank paper. He says that his hatred of Toads comes from the Origami Craftsman who created him by using a forbidden "Fold of Life" technique, which Olly himself later used to bring Olivia to life. However, the Craftsman wrote words on Olly's paper, which Olly took as a disrespect of the art. A fight ensues, and Mario, Olivia, and Bowser defeat Olly.

As he dies, Olly apologizes for his actions. Olivia reads the writing on his body, which reveals the Toad was only giving Olly his blessing to rule as King. Olly realizes his mistake, and at his request, Olivia folds him into the 1,000th crane after his death. She uses her ultimate wish to undo all the origami King Olly has folded, which includes herself. The game closes with a celebration of the Origami Festival.

== Development ==
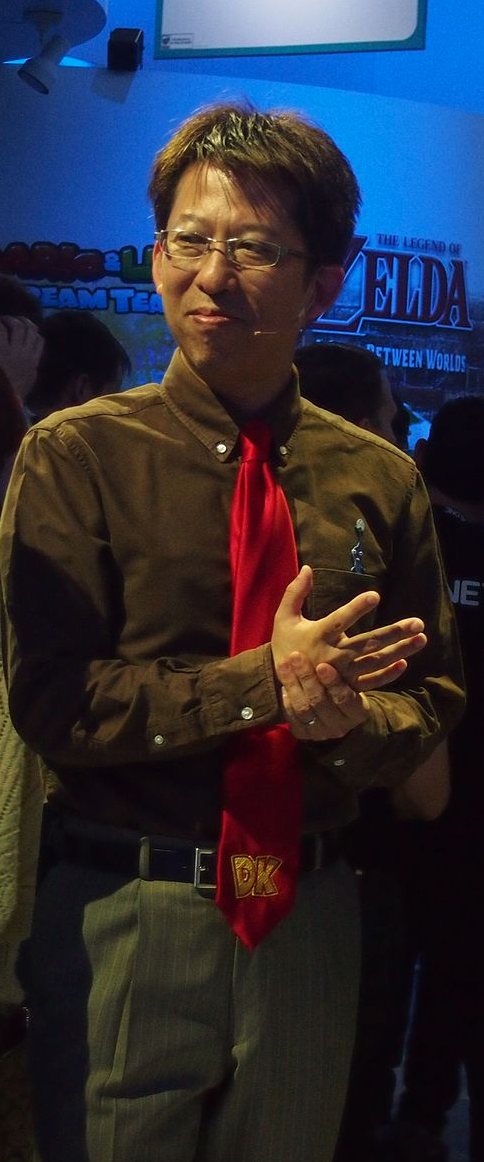
Kensuke Tanabe, supervisor and producer of the franchise since Paper Mario: The Thousand-Year Door

Intelligent Systems, the creators behind the earlier Paper Mario games, developed The Origami King. Tose contributed to design and audio. While Shigeru Miyamoto was involved initially with the Paper Mario series, producer Kensuke Tanabe claimed he was barely involved in its creation, and that Nintendo gave the developers "almost complete control" over the game's direction. Producers also included Atsushi Ikuno and assistant producer Risa Tabata. Masahiko Nagaya served as the lead director, who originally worked as an artist for Paper Mario: Color Splash. Lead designers also included Yukio Morimoto and Shingo Igata, programmer Tadao Nakayama, artists Isamu Kamikokuryo and Benoit Ferrière, and writer Taro Kudo. The lead composers and sound designers were Yoshito Sekigawa, Shoh Murakami, Yoshiaki Kimura, Hiroki Morishita, and Fumihiro Isobe. According to Eurogamer, Nintendo had intended to announce the game at E3 2020 as part of a presentation celebrating the Super Mario series' 35th anniversary.

Nintendo's Kensuke Tanabe, the game's producer, said he, "challenge[d himself] to create something new" by innovating different concepts than those used in other games in the series. He explained that The Origami King's gameplay differed from Color Splash because he did not believe in repeating identical concepts from a previous game. He would use the same concept, but would develop it until it eventually reached its maximum potential. To establish a new non-Mario direction for the game, confetti and origami became The Origami King's two major themes. Tanabe thought of paper-based ideas that had not been used in the series, and came up with origami, while Intelligent Systems had the idea for confetti.

=== Characters ===
Since the release of Paper Mario: Sticker Star, new characters in the Paper Mario series could not be modified versions of existing characters, such as a change in age or gender, and any original characters had to have had no previous involvement with the Mario universe. Character designs went through a critical review by Nintendo's intellectual property team, although the designers were allowed to give Toads different outfits. On June 12, 2020, Nintendo released another trailer revealing partners that will join Mario on his adventure and help complete tasks, such as aiding in combat. Although the feature had remained absent from the games since Sticker Star, critics were still disappointed that the allies did not seem to have much functionality; some were hoping for partners that would help solve puzzles and progress in skill alongside Mario.

Tanabe intended the origami Princess Peach to have an inhuman aura which he used to appeal to a more adult audience. He visualized her approaching Mario while she turned into an origami form; the game's opening sequence eventually used this action. To ensure characters would still be recognizable in their origami form, the artists analyzed each character to determine "whether a side-on or front-on view would be best to bring out their individuality". They created real-life mock-ups to make sure the in-game forms would be similarly realistic.

"The Paper Mario series is all about paper. We came up with the idea of office supplies when we were thinking about various motifs that are related to paper but are not anti-origami. We found that the somewhat strange-looking real-life representation of office supplies without adding human features to them could work well as a visual hook for the game. In the end, 'normal' isn't necessarily exciting, is it?"

— Producer Kensuke Tanabe, 2020 PC Games interview

The Legion of Stationery is an example of the concept of having characters not involved with the Mario franchise. The developers chose "objects that everyone will have interacted with at some point in their lives" for these roles. Tanabe referenced his childhood to develop these characters imagining what their weaknesses would be based on their function, such as hitting the backside of the hole punch during its boss battle to knock out previously punched paper. He also conceptualized their attacks based on childhood imagination and how children pretend what objects could do. For example, colored pencils act as missiles in-game because of their shape.

Mario's first partner conceptualized for the game was Bobby. He was conceived with the intention of providing more memorable events tied to specific areas, rather than having a complicated story. The Origami King established characters that would appear alongside Mario and Olivia as the game progressed. Bobby's character arc, particularly his sacrifice, received critical praise. Destructoid writer James Herd listed him as one of the best Nintendo characters of all time, bemoaning that he has not gotten more attention from fans. Game Rant writer Joshua Duckworth listed Bobby as one of the best video game characters of 2020, feeling that he was a more complex character than on the surface and made a "major impact" on the story. Nintendo Life writer Gavin Lane considered his sacrifice one of the best Nintendo moments of 2020, praising the writers and localization team for the work they put into him. Writing for Gizmodo, Beth Elderkin praised Bobby's character as "funny, charming, and adorable," discussing how his backstory caused her to break out into tears and how she grew even more upset at his sacrifice. She noted how impressive it was that a game with such simple concepts could make such an effective character as Bobby. In an interview with Video Games Chronicle, Tanabe claimed Bobby became just as memorable as Olivia.

Deciding upon other additional characters, Tanabe added "we chose the characters that would be the best fit for the events in each stage of the game". Bowser Jr. "was an exception"; the team added him as a character before they had figured out what role he would play because Masahiko Nagaya, an Intelligent Systems director, "had strong feelings about including a storyline where a son sets out to save his father".

When developing Olivia, the creators aimed to give her as much personality as possible. Tanabe said most characters that aid the protagonist tend to be guides or teachers and have little personality. He wanted to have a female character with as much of an outgoing personality as possible. He modeled her on "a certain Japanese actress". Initially it took a lot of effort to write her dialogue, but toward the end of development, it became rather easy. Tanabe felt she was almost "writing her own lines".

=== Design ===
The world design and the game's locations were created before the writers produced any dialogue. During the development of a scene, and the events that were unique to each section, the creators determined the emotion these should evoke in the player such as "astonishment or enthusiasm". They decided whether a scene should be shown as a "cutscene, dialogue or as a playable mini-game". The creators worked closely with Nintendo as they produced the game's many mini games so that the rules and the degree of difficulty matched the game's intended "emotional flow".

"I'm not opposed to the fans' opinions. However, I view my game development philosophy as separate from that. If we used the same gameplay system wanted by the fans again and again, we wouldn't be able to surprise them or deliver new gameplay experiences. We always try our best to exceed expectations in surprising ways."

— Producer Kensuke Tanabe, 2020 Eurogamer.de interview

Tanabe spoke with the director of Color Splash, Naohiko Aoyama, who wanted "a battle system in which the enemies surround Mario to attack from all sides". They collaborated to form the game's ring-based combat, and Tanabe later implemented the idea of being able to slide enemies across the circles. He compared the idea to a Rubik's Cube saying, "it worked well. That is the moment I was convinced we'd be able to build our battle system." To demonstrate his idea for boss battles, Tanabe "drew concentric circles on a whiteboard, put mock-ups of some panels using magnets with arrows and other things drawn on them". He noted boss battles were designed to be "the opposite of regular battles" and worked with Tabata to simulate how the battles would work in-game, then proposed the idea to Intelligent Systems.

The Origami King uses open world navigation, as opposed to the linear-based style of previous Mario games. Tanabe recalled the design team were "careful [...] to make sure there is always something in the player's field of vision to catch their attention". When asked if they had considered using a party-based system in The Origami King like the first three Paper Mario games, Tanabe replied that he never considered the idea. "[W]e chose the characters that would be the best fit for the events in each stage of the game". He felt that having partners exclusive to certain areas "create[s] more memorable moments".

Responding to criticism over the game's lack of several RPG elements, Tanabe commented on the difficulty of being able to satisfy fans who prefer the RPG genre. Not wanting to ignore casual players, he implemented several puzzle solving elements hoping to satisfy the franchise's core fans. He explained that "players need to guess the weak points of bosses based on their characteristics and search for the solution to defeat them, otherwise they won't be able to win these battles. This is an adventure game after all, so it wouldn't be right if the battles didn't also have some kind of puzzle solving element!" When asked if he was aware of the criticisms of the previous games, Tanabe replied that he could not address every fan suggestion. Instead, he challenged himself to move towards new and innovative concepts, and focus on them so a large audience can enjoy them. He said he had not decided whether the series will return to the original RPG style.

=== Promotion and release ===
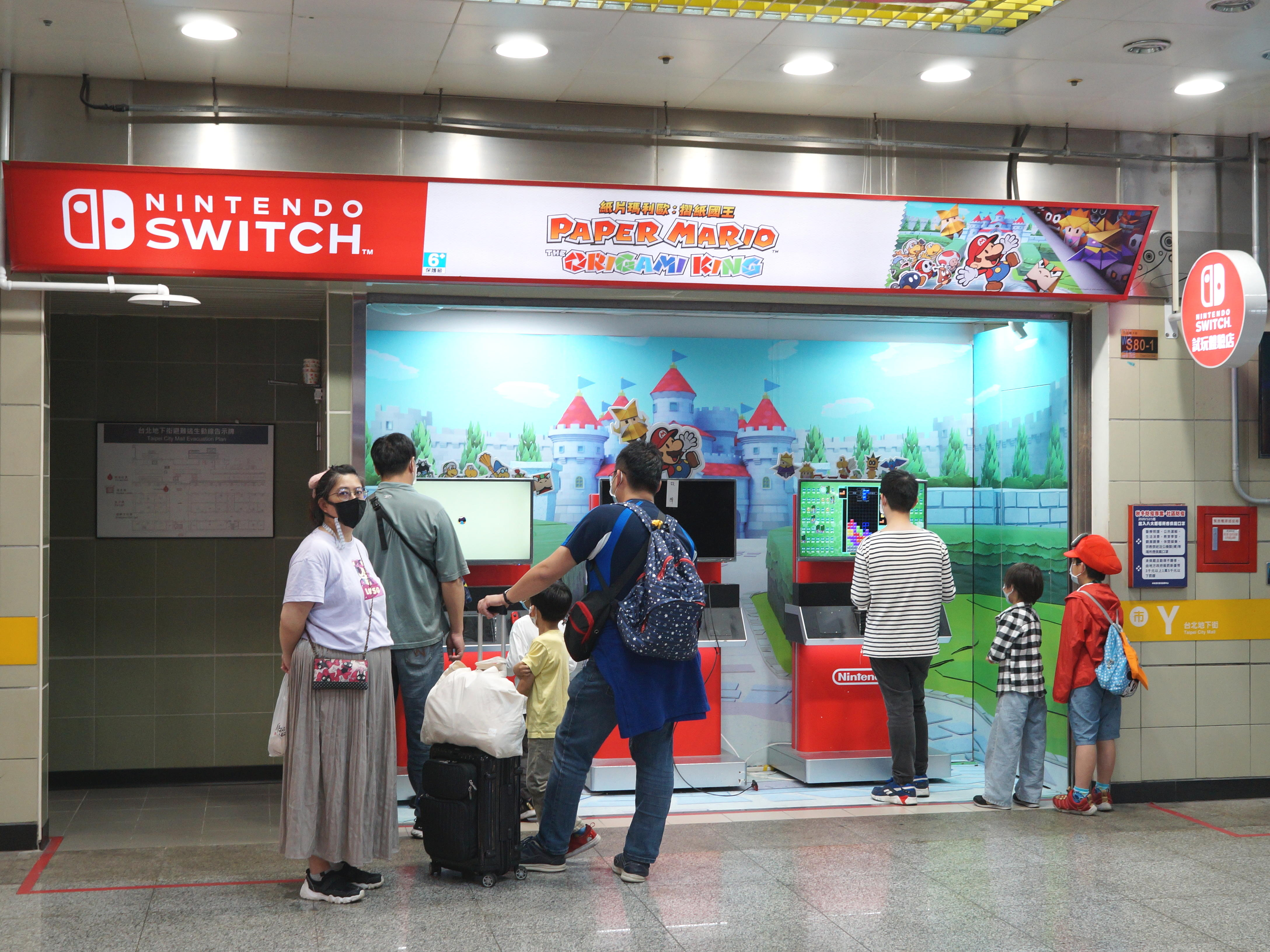
A demo booth for The Origami King at a mall in Taipei, Taiwan in 2021

The game was leaked online a week prior to the game's launch, where players started spreading unannounced content, such as other characters and dialogue, with other people playing the game using PC emulators. Nintendo released a trailer announcing The Origami King on May 14, 2020, alongside promotional pamphlets produced exclusively for Japan, before they released the game on July 17. The trailer announcement, released on YouTube, appeared without the traditional two-day notice that Nintendo had given previously. VentureBeat wrote that the sudden announcement came because Nintendo was still adjusting to the transition of having employees working from home with the COVID 19 pandemic. Alongside the physical copy, pre-purchases of the game at the Nintendo UK store came with a bonus pack of origami sheets and magnets. After release, players discovered multiple glitches in the game that prevented the player from progressing; Nintendo resolved these on August 5. On August 28, Nintendo added Olivia, King Olly, and Origami Princess Peach as collectible spirits in Super Smash Bros. Ultimate.

In the game, the first trapped Toad Mario and Olivia discover complains that they have been poorly treated. The character says, "What do they have against Toads! It's not fair! Toads have rights! This is Toad abuse!" When translated into Traditional Chinese and Simplified Chinese, the quotes about rights and freedom were removed and replaced with, "Return the smooth appearance to Toads! Give back the easy life to Toads!", referring to his paper body. People who responded to the discovery on Twitter considered the change "unspeakably strange", and some wondered if Nintendo had made these changes because of the Hong Kong national security law. The original poster of the comment has received some criticism from people arguing that China could not have interfered and the translation could be a pun. Nintendo released no comments about the situation.

== Reception ==
Reception

Aggregate scores
Aggregator	Score
Metacritic	80/100
OpenCritic	63% recommend

Review scores
Publication	Score
4Players	88/100
Electronic Gaming Monthly	3/5
Famitsu	9/10, 9/10, 9/10, 9/10
Game Informer	7.75/10
GameSpot	8/10
GamesRadar+	4.5/5
Hardcore Gamer	4/5
IGN	7/10
Nintendo Life	8/10
The Guardian	4/5
USgamer	4/5
VentureBeat	85/100

=== Reviews ===
Paper Mario: The Origami King received "generally favorable reviews", according to review aggregator website Metacritic. The website calculated an 80/100 score based upon 114 reviews. Fellow review aggregator OpenCritic assessed that the game received strong approval, being recommended by 63% of critics.

Critics praised the game for its unique writing, appreciating each character's unique, comedic dialogue. Some critics praised Olivia in particular for her personality and humor. Bobby has received critical attention for his role in the game. Beth Elder of Gizmodo noted the strength of storytelling in video games; she said they "can make us truly connect with their characters". Electronic Gaming Monthly praised each Toads' witty dialogue, noting how it kept the overall hunt fresh. However, Suriel Vazquez's GameSpot review criticized the game's character designs for being less charming than early entries in the series.

In addition, critics praised the world design and mechanics for their innovation. Many of them enjoyed the paper-style worldbuilding, saying it topped the game off and paired well with the storyline. The game's linear open world design was compared to the likes of The Legend of Zelda series. Some critics appreciated how the world is interactive, with characters, collectible treasures, and that it seems there is something interactive almost everywhere. Critics found it fun to explore and discover hidden Toads in the environment, calling the experience entertaining on its own. Reviewers called the soundtrack calming and catchy and appreciated the gradual change during progression throughout each world.

The game was praised for its design and concept, but criticized for dropping the role-playing elements present in previous Paper Mario titles. Critics indicated that the game was a new and unique experience, but thought the action-adventure style of gameplay did not reach the heights of previous games, such as Paper Mario: The Thousand-Year Door. The game was commonly criticized for lacking an experience point (XP) system. ESPN's Sean Morisson missed the "satisfying progression" from XP, but considering other good concepts from the game, was split on "whether it mattered all that much."

The combat mechanics' reception was mixed. Many reviewers described the fighting style as innovative, a fun twist on basic formats, with boss battles being particularly praised. GameSpot called the new combat system clever, stating how it "[turned] the series' Achilles' heel into one of its biggest strengths". Multiple reviewers from Famitsu enjoyed the combat, appreciating how the style was a strong puzzle element. However, several critics judged the combat to be unrewarding, and at times, either frustrating or lacking any challenge. Although Cam Shea of IGN thought the new concept was innovative, he felt the combat lacked meaning, an inconvenience rather than challenging. Chris Kohler agreed in his review on Kotaku, appreciating how the reward of coins sometimes made battles worth it, but that they did not amount to much compared to XP.

=== Sales ===
The Origami King launched at number two in the United Kingdom behind Ghost of Tsushima, and sold 109,092 physical copies in its first week in Japan, making it the second best-selling game in the nation. The game placed third on the July 2020 NPD charts, setting a launch month sales record for the series, and doubling the physical launch sales of Super Paper Mario in the U.S. In July 2020, the game became the bestselling Nintendo Switch game on Amazon. By December 31, 2020, the game had sold 3.05 million copies, becoming the fastest selling game in the series and one of the best-selling games on the Switch. By March 31, 2021, the game has sold 3.12 million copies. As of December 31, 2021, the game has sold 3.34 million copies. As of December 31, 2022, the game has sold 3.47 million copies.

=== Awards and nominations ===
In 2020, the game was nominated for Best Family Game and Nintendo Game of the Year categories in the Golden Joystick Awards, but lost to Fall Guys and Animal Crossing: New Horizons respectively. In addition, the game lost to New Horizons in the Best Family Game category in The Game Awards. VentureBeat, Polygon, Kotaku, and EGM listed the game as one of the best releases of 2020. Nintendo Life and IGN rated the game among the best Nintendo exclusives of 2020. The game was one of the best RPGs of 2020 by score, according to GameSpot. In 2023, CNET listed the game as one of the best RPGs on the Nintendo Switch.

Year	Award ceremony	Category	Result	Ref.
2020	2020 Golden Joystick Awards	Best Family Game	Nominated	
2020	2020 Golden Joystick Awards	Nintendo Game of the Year	Nominated	
2020	The Game Awards 2020	Best Family Game	Nominated	

== See also ==
- Paper Mario (video game)
- Mario & Luigi: Paper Jam
