= Ripened Tingle's Balloon Trip of Love =

2009 video game

Irozuki Tingle no Koi no Balloon Trip
- Developer: Vanpool
- Publisher: Nintendo
- Director: Jun Tsuda
- Producer: Kensuke Tanabe
- Composers: Masanori Adachi; Tomoko Sano; Kiyoshi Hazemoto
- Series: The Legend of Zelda
- Platform: Nintendo DS
- Release: JP: August 6, 2009
- Genre: Adventure
- Mode: Single-player

Irozuki Tingle no Koi no Balloon Trip (いろづきチンクルの恋のバルーントリップ, Irozuki Chinkuru no Koi no Barūn Torippu; lit. "Color Changing Tingle's Balloon Trip of Love" or "Ripened Tingle's Balloon Trip of Love") is a 2009 adventure game developed by Vanpool and published by Nintendo for the Nintendo DS exclusively in Japan. It is the sequel to Freshly-Picked Tingle's Rosy Rupeeland (2006) and a spin-off of The Legend of Zelda series.

== Overview ==
The game's storyline starts with an ordinary 35-year-old man who watches a direct sales program on television and orders a book said to make its readers popular among women. When the man opens the book, he gets sucked into a picture book world. In this world, he becomes Tingle, wearing a green costume. Tingle meets three characters that accompany him on his journey to escape the world: Kakashi the scarecrow, Buriki the tin robot woman, and Lion the lion. These characters are inspired by the Scarecrow, the Tin Woodman, and the Cowardly Lion from The Wonderful Wizard of Oz, respectively.

The player has to solve many puzzles that require use of the different abilities of Tingle's three partners. Kakashi lacks intelligence, but is small and therefore able to get into small places. Buriki is very intelligent, but heartless, and can cleverly solve puzzles Tingle's other partners can't. The party's last member, Lion, is more powerful than the other two partners, but cowardly. Many of the actions in the game are performed via the stylus. Another central gameplay element is the romantic interaction with five different female characters. The player has to find the right words during the dialogues and to give Tingle's love interests the best fitting items to win their favor. This is necessary for continuing the adventure. To complete the game, Tingle must have some degree of a relationship with all of the girls. Unlike its predecessor, Irozuki Tingle no Koi no Balloon Trip is completely touch screen controlled, except for a small dungeon mini-game segment, in which a control pad may be purchased.

== Development ==
Irozuki Tingle no Koi no Balloon Trip was developed by Vanpool, the company that also created Freshly-Picked Tingle's Rosy Rupeeland. A first hint at the game appeared in an issue of the Japanese magazine Famitsu published in June 2009. It contained a teaser advertisement depicting a tiny picture of Tingle along with a line of text saying Yōsei? (ようせい?, lit. "Fairy?"). Nintendo opened a teaser website on June 12, hinting at an then-upcoming Nintendo DS game starring Tingle. Another issue of Famitsu published in late June revealed that actually two Tingle-centric titles were teased, the DSiWare application Dekisugi Tingle Pack and the Nintendo DS game Irodzuki Tingle no Koi no Balloon Trip. The latter game was released on August 6 in Japan.

=== Fan translation ===
An English fan translation patch for the game was released on January 1, 2018 after five years of development.

== Reception ==
Famitsu awarded Irozuki Tingle no Koi no Balloon Trip a score of 34 out of 40. It was the 9th best-selling game in Japan during the week of its release, selling 33,498 units. The following week it placed 9th again with 17,956 copies sold. In August 2009, the game sold 70,544 units in total, placing 10th in the Japanese sales charts for that month.
