= Tingle (The Legend of Zelda) =

Fictional character

- Tingle and The Legend of Zelda character
- Tingle in Hyrule Historia
- First game: The Legend of Zelda: Majora's Mask (2000)
- Created by: Takaya Imamura
- Voiced by: Hironori Miyata (2003–2008); Kazuyuki Kurashima (2007)

Tingle (Note: Japanese: チンクル, Hepburn: Chinkuru; also romanized as Tincle and Chinkle in Japanese materials.) is a recurring character in The Legend of Zelda series, designed by Takaya Imamura. He first appeared in Majora's Mask, where he is a map salesman who wants to become a fairy. He has since appeared in several installments, including The Wind Waker, where he provides maps to help Link find pieces of the Triforce. He has gone on to be the star of Freshly-Picked Tingle's Rosy Rupeeland, where his origin as Tingle is shown as him tasked with collecting as many Rupees as possible. He also appears in its sequel Irozuki Tingle no Koi no Balloon Trip, where he is transported into a storybook and has to enter into relationships with women in order to escape.

== Concept and creation ==
Tingle was created by Takaya Imamura for The Legend of Zelda: Majora's Mask, a game designer at Nintendo EAD, doing so in a "very relaxed manner." Imamura was intending for him to have a creepy design, and hoped that he would continue to appear in more games. He is a 35-year-old man who is obsessed with the "forest fairies" known as the Kokiri and dresses up in a green costume. The Legend of Zelda producer Eiji Aonuma explained that Tingle had been designed as a way for the player to access maps in Majora's Mask. He wanted such a character to have humor to them, and wanted him to be the one to make the maps as well as sell them. He noted that someone flying with a balloon would be seen as strange, so they leaned into that with his design and characterization. Aonuma compares Tingle not wanting to grow up and wearing green to Peter Pan, also noting that he is not gay. He is also known for his catchphrase: "Tingle, Tingle! Kooloo-Limpah!" (チンクル、チンクル! クルリンパー！, Chinkuru, Chinkuru! Kururinpa!). The word "kururinpa" is used by Japanese people when they spin their finger around and point to someone, indicating that they may be a crazy person.

Tingle was included in The Wind Waker due to Imamura's involvement in the game's development. Game designer Mari Shirakawa commented on how she was initially unsettled by Tingle, but grew to find him "adorable," talking about how "hate can slowly turn to love" and how if someone did not care about Tingle at all, they would neither feel love nor hate. She felt that people who hate him must care about him, a notion that caused them to begin development of Tingle's own game, Freshly-Picked Tingle's Rosy Rupeeland. She stated that he is not a "typical Nintendo character," allowing him to say and do things that typical Nintendo characters would not. Tingle was going to star in a horror game before it was cancelled.

== Appearances ==
Tingle made his debut in the Nintendo 64 game Majora's Mask. Throughout Link's adventure, he helps Link navigate Termina by selling him maps of various areas. His father operates the pictograph contest at the Woodfall Swamp, and is ashamed by his son's behavior. Tingle's other major appearance is in The Wind Waker, where Link frees Tingle from prison and is given the Tingle Tuner as a reward, which allows a second player to play as Tingle on the Game Boy Advance. In the Wii U remake, Tingle gives Link the Tingle Bottle instead, which can be used to post on Miiverse. In both versions, Tingle gives Link a map to Tingle Island, and can be found for the rest of the game on this island. He deciphers the charts needed to haul the Triforce Shards from the ocean floor, with the number of charts reduced in the remake. He is accompanied by his brother, Ankle, and a man named David Jr. who is made to work by Tingle. His brother, Knuckle, also can appear, though only through use of the Tingle Tuner.

He appears in various minor roles across the series, including Oracle of Ages, Four Swords Adventures, and The Minish Cap. He is also referenced in Phantom Hourglass, Spirit Tracks, and Skyward Sword. In Breath of the Wild and Tears of the Kingdom Link is able to collect and wear a Tingle outfit, which gives him a night speed bonus and makes other characters afraid of Link. Furthermore, Tingle appears as a playable character in Hyrule Warriors via the Majora's Mask DLC pack. Tingle appears in Cadence of Hyrule as a non-playable character who helps the player navigate the Lost Woods.

Tingle's first starring role was in the spin-off title game known as Freshly-Picked Tingle's Rosy Rupeeland for the Nintendo DS. It tells the story of Tingle becoming who he is after meeting a character known as Uncle Rupee, who encourages him to obtain wealth by any means necessary. The game was released in Europe and Japan, but went unreleased in North America despite a survey polling North American respondents whether they would be interested in it. In its sequel Irozuki Tingle no Koi no Balloon Trip, a regular man is sucked into a magical book and turned into Tingle, and has to establish relationships with women in order to escape. He is the star of Tingle's Balloon Fight DS, a rebranded and updated version of Balloon Fight, and Dekisugi Tingle Pack, a DSiWare application that includes several different minigames.

Outside of The Legend of Zelda and Tingle series, he appears in Super Smash Bros. Melee and Super Smash Bros. Ultimate as part of the Great Bay stage, as well as an Assist Trophy in Brawl and Super Smash Bros. for Nintendo 3DS and Wii U. In those games, he threw out a large amount of items that could quickly be grabbed by all of the fighters, though may also do nothing instead. He also appears as a trophy in those games, the former based on Majora's Mask and the latter two based on The Wind Waker. Tingle also appears in Super Mario Maker as one of the unlockable "Mystery Mushroom" outfits.

== Impact and reception ==
Outside of Japan, Tingle received an overwhelmingly negative reception, compared to notoriously criticized Star Wars character Jar Jar Binks by GamesRadar+. The editors at IGN, in an article titled "Die, Tingle, Die!", did not like Tingle, in part because his role in The Wind Waker was an integral part of "tedious fetch quests", a sentiment shared by PALGN writer Matt Keller, who felt he was the weakest element of the game. When development for Twilight Princess began, IGN staff hoped that game directors Shigeru Miyamoto and Eiji Aonuma would not include the character, saying "we're not going to stand for him in another Zelda game". Fan distaste for Tingle ultimately led to his exclusion from Twilight Princess, though the character Purlo was meant as a reference to Tingle, with the idea of his representing how a realistic Tingle would work. Nintendo World Report writer Pedro Hernandez suggested that Tingle did not become a disliked character until The Wind Waker, suggesting that him getting his own series and being "weird and flamboyant" contributed to his negative reception. He felt that Tingle was proof of just how much a minor character in The Legend of Zelda can be "so captivating." Commenting on the negative reception, Kensuke Tanabe expressed interest in making another Tingle game, hoping that he could turn him into a beloved character among western fans.

Despite his negative reception, he has developed a cult following in Japan. Writer Kyle Hilliard, however, despite finding him strange, regarded him as one of the most endearing characters in The Wind Waker. The Gamer writer Cian Maher called him one of the "most contentious" characters in the series, noting how he had the popularity to get multiple games starring himself, but also strongly disliked, citing IGN's "Die, Tingle, Die!" campaign. Maher considered him "one of Nintendo's most fascinating and ambitious characters," calling him designer Takaya Imamura's "magnum opus." Due to Tingle's continued absence as a character in the Zelda series, he is a common gamers' meme and in-joke, with the question of "Where's Tingle?" being a recurring joke around the time of Zelda title releases.
