= Dillon's Dead-Heat Breakers =

2018 video game

- Developer: Vanpool
- Publisher: Nintendo
- Director: Jun Tsuda
- Producer: Kensuke Tanabe
- Designers: Jun Taniguchi; Kota Ikarashi
- Programmer: Yohei Fukuda
- Artists: Shinji Usui; Shingo Kabaya
- Composer: Kiyoshi Hazemoto
- Series: Dillon
- Platform: Nintendo 3DS
- Release: JP: April 26. 2018; NA: May 24, 2018; EU: May 25, 2018; AU: May 26, 2018
- Genres: Action, tower defense
- Mode: Single-player

Dillon's Dead-Heat Breakers (Note: Dillon's Dead-Heat Breakers (ザ・デッドヒートブレイカーズ, Za Deddo Hīto Bureikāzu; "The Dead Heat Breakers")) is a 2018 action video game developed by Vanpool and published by Nintendo for the Nintendo 3DS. It was released in Japan in April 2018, with English releases in North America, Europe, and Australia the following month, with the North American version being limited as digital-only. A sequel to Dillon's Rolling Western, it takes place in a post-apocalyptic world and features Dillon, an anthropomorphic armadillo who must defend frontier villages from walking rock-like monsters. The player is included in the game's cast as their Mii avatar in the form of an "Amiimal" with added animal features from various species. It received mixed reviews from critics, who most greatly criticized its repetitiveness.

== Plot ==
The game has a darker setting compared to its predecessors, changing its world to be post-apocalyptic. From their home base in The City, Dillon and a band of mercenaries help defend smaller towns and other locations from the Grock invasion.

== Gameplay ==
The game is a combination of tower defense and action elements. The player must defend against walking rock monsters called Grocks. Mercenaries and the player's avatar use guns to fight the monsters from towers while the player controls Dillon and dashes around the map to fight the monsters one on one.

The Grocks have several stages in their invasion process - once they finish attacking on land, their mothership transforms them into vehicles that race around the roadways of the map. In the third phase, the Grocks become superpowered and charge directly at the base.

== Development ==
The game's setting was changed away from Western-themed to post-apocalyptic because it was seen as more of a familiar setting to modern audiences. Its producer, Kensuke Tanabe, said it drew inspiration from Mad Max and was originally only going to be a racing game, but the old gameplay was later combined with the new.

== Reception ==
Reception

Aggregate scores
Aggregator	Score
Metacritic	69/100 (Note: Score based on 29 reviews)
OpenCritic	40% recommend (Note: Score based on 25 reviews)

Review scores
Publication	Score
Destructoid	75/100
GameSpot	6/10
Nintendo World Report	8.5/10

Dillon's Dead-Heat Breakers received "mixed or average" reviews according to review aggregator Metacritic, with 40% of critics recommending the game according to OpenCritic. Neal Ronaghan of Nintendo World Report rated the game 8.5/10, saying that while the game was greatly improved from its predecessors, its pace was overly slow. CJ Andriessen of Destructoid rated it 75/100, calling it a "solid adventure through and through", but criticizing the existence of a game-breaking bug on release. He also stated that the process of mission preparation was "arduous" and the game's economy "baffling". Daniel Starkey of GameSpot rated the game 6/10, saying that while it was "action-packed", the controls were "perplexing" and the combat and day-night cycle were repetitive. He stated that "it's a competent and fun little outing that's almost perfectly suited for kids".
