= Paper Mario: Sticker Star =

2012 video game

- North American packaging artwork
- Developers: Intelligent Systems; Vanpool
- Publisher: Nintendo
- Directors: Naohiko Aoyama; Taro Kudo
- Producers: Kensuke Tanabe; Toshiyuki Nakamura
- Designers: Yukio Morimoto; Toshitaka Muramatsu
- Programmer: Junya Kadono
- Writer: Taro Kudo
- Composer: List of composers: Masanobu Matsunaga Shoh Murakami Yasuhisa Baba Hiroki Morishita Saki Kurata Yoshito Sekigawa Masanori Adachi Kiyoshi Hazemoto Tomoko Sano Kosei Muraki Hiroaki Hanaoka
- Series: Paper Mario
- Platform: Nintendo 3DS
- Release: NA: November 11, 2012; JP: December 6, 2012; EU: December 7, 2012; AU: December 8, 2012
- Genres: Action-adventure, role-playing
- Mode: Single-player

Paper Mario: Sticker Star (Note: Japanese: ペーパーマリオスーパーシール, Hepburn: Pēpā Mario Sūpā Shīru; known in Japan as Paper Mario: Super Seal) is a 2012 role-playing video game developed by Intelligent Systems and published by Nintendo for the Nintendo 3DS. Following Super Paper Mario (2007), it is the fourth installment in the Paper Mario series and part of the larger Mario franchise; it is the first game in the series released on a handheld console. The story follows Mario and a new ally named Kersti as they travel across the Mushroom Kingdom to retrieve the six Royal Stickers scattered by Bowser.

Unlike previous Paper Mario games, Sticker Star uses a distinct papercraft visual style, which is heavily incorporated into its gameplay mechanics. Sticker Star introduces stickers, which are littered throughout the game world and serve as single-use items or power-ups, aiding the player in turn-based battles against enemies or in solving puzzles. Game designer and producer Shigeru Miyamoto insisted that gameplay should be distinct from previous Paper Mario games, which led to Sticker Star placing greater emphasis on gameplay and combat, with less focus on story. Allies alongside Mario were cut due to complications with sticker mechanics, and there was a large decrease in characters with unique designs.

Sticker Star was released in November 2012 in North America, and December 2012 in other regions. It received generally favorable reviews, with praise for its graphics, writing, and strategy. Criticism targeted its unbalanced difficulty in combat, lack of traditional role-playing game elements, minimal story, and abundance of identical Toads instead of the original fictional races the series had been known for. Reception for the sticker mechanics was mixed. Despite a generally positive reception from critics, it is looked at generally unfavorably by the Paper Mario fandom for its diversions to the formula which they felt drove the series downwards in future entries. A sequel, Paper Mario: Color Splash, which carried over many ideas introduced in Sticker Star, was released for the Wii U in October 2016.

== Gameplay ==
Mario explores the first level of the game. A Worn-Out Jump sticker is seen attached to a wall.

Sticker Star features a similar visual style to its predecessors. The player controls a paper cutout version of Mario in a 3D papercraft world, with landscapes ranging from snowy areas and forests to volcanoes represented as the Mushroom Kingdom. The story focuses on Mario's efforts to retrieve the six Royal Stickers that have been scattered by Bowser after he attacked the annual Sticker Fest. Mario is accompanied by Kersti, a sticker fairy, who bestows upon Mario the power of stickers.

Mario attacks a Goomba using a Jump sticker in battle. Mario's stats and available attacks are determined by collecting stickers.

A major facet of Sticker Star's gameplay is the use of collectible stickers, which are used to gain abilities to progress through the game. The player collects stickers that are found and peeled off from various areas in the environment. Additionally, the player can purchase stickers using coins or receive them from non-playable characters (NPC). The player has limited inventory space, with larger stickers taking up more room. Stickers are used both in combat and for interacting with the environment. The player can enter a state called "Paperization", which will lay the screen down flat to reveal additional secrets not visible regularly. Real-world objects can be found, known in-game as "Things", such as baseball bats and scissors, that can be turned into special types of stickers called "Thing Stickers", which are often needed to solve puzzles in the overworld. For example, a Fan Thing Sticker can be placed in strategic areas in the environment and, when activated, creates wind that moves or destroys obstacles.

As in previous games, combat in Sticker Star takes place in turn-based battles which are initiated when Mario comes into contact with enemies in the overworld. The player's available attacks are determined by the stickers on hand from their inventory. For example, possession of the Jump sticker can be used to attack an enemy by jumping on it. Certain kinds of attacks are required depending on the enemy being fought; an enemy wearing a spiked helmet cannot be jumped on and must instead be attacked using a different kind of sticker, like a hammer. Thing Stickers are used to inflict more damage on enemies, and certain types of Thing Stickers are required to make boss battles easier. Each sticker is removed from play after one use, making it necessary for the player to consistently collect new stickers. The player increases their maximum health points (HP) and other stats through collection of HP-Up hearts, which give Mario five more health points and stronger attacks.

== Plot ==
Every year, the Sticker Comet lands in the Mushroom Kingdom, and those who wish on it have a good chance of their wish being granted by the Royal Stickers that reside within the comet. Mario attends the Sticker Fest, a festival held in the city of Decalburg to celebrate the Sticker Comet's arrival; where Princess Peach presents the comet on stage. There, as the Toads all prepare their wishes, Bowser interrupts the celebration and breaks the comet into six parts, the Royal Stickers, scattering them over the Kingdom, with one falling on Bowser's head; Mario tries to stop him, but fails and is knocked unconscious. He is later awakened by Kersti, a sticker assistant, who is tasked with granting the wishes made to the Sticker Comet. After cleaning up Bowser's mess in Decalburg, Mario and Kersti depart to search for the first of the Royal Stickers.

Mario and Kersti traverse six areas to retrieve each of the six Royal Stickers. Each Royal Sticker is guarded by a boss, and upon defeating each, a cutscene shows how the boss received the Royal Sticker and what their motivation was. Megasparkle Goomba took the first Royal Sticker as a crown and calls himself a king; Tower Power Pokey was sealed by Kamek; Gooper Blooper was a music-lover uncontrollably releasing poison; Mizzter Blizzard wanted to control winter in order to never melt; a large Piranha Plant known as Petey Piranha simply accidentally ate his Sticker.

After collecting each Royal Sticker, the duo enters Bowser's Castle and eventually confront Bowser. During the final battle, Kersti sacrifices herself to give Mario sticker powers in order to defeat Bowser. Upon defeat, Bowser drops the last Royal Sticker. Mario uses his wish to restore peace to the Mushroom Kingdom and restore the Sticker Comet, resurrecting Kersti in the process. The credits roll over a parade for the Sticker Comet.

== Development ==
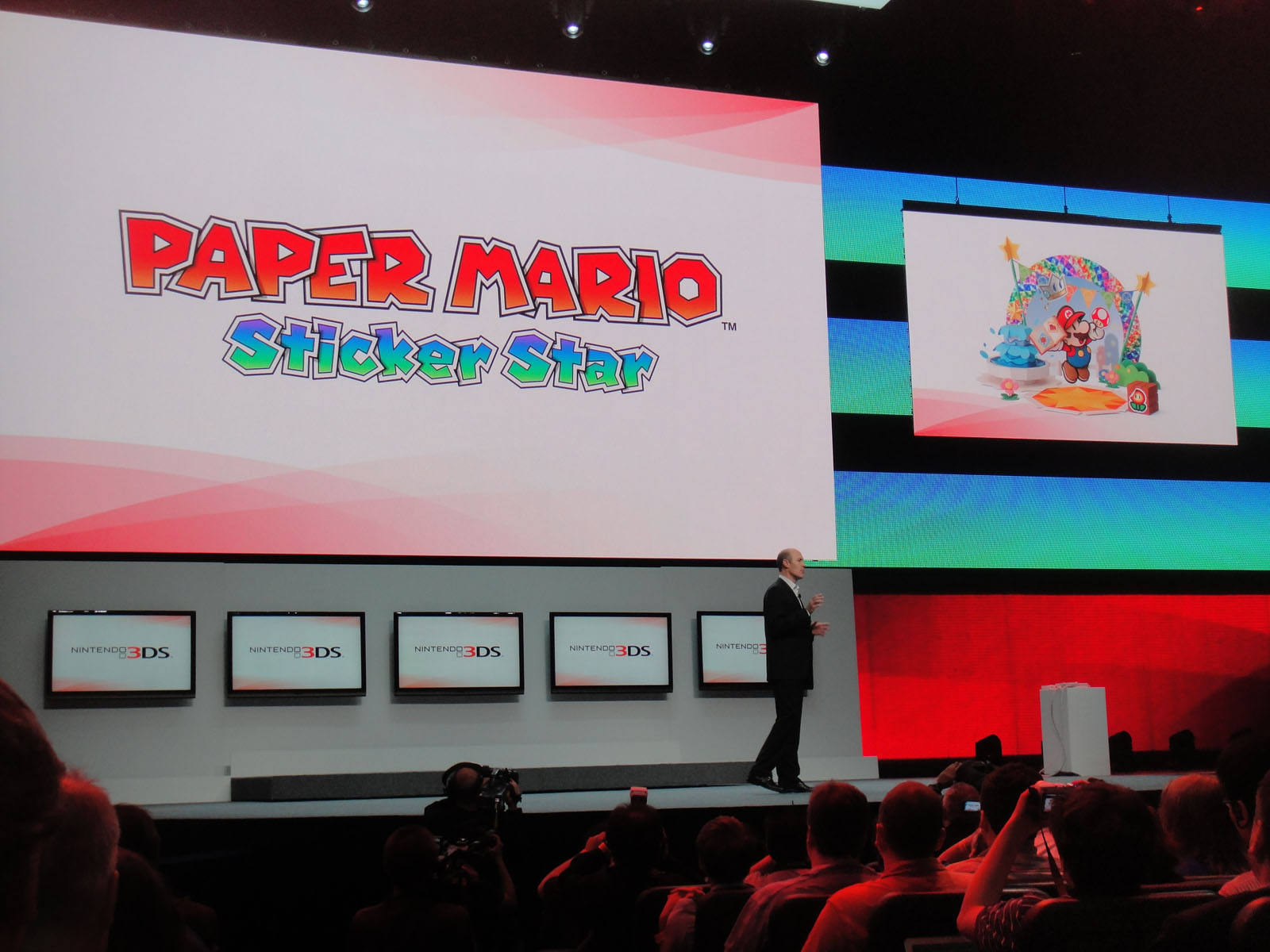
Sticker Star being presented at E3 2012

Sticker Star was announced at E3 2010 under the tentative title Paper Mario, demonstrated in trailer form. Few details about the new Paper Mario title were given outside of additional trailers that were released at Nintendo World 2011 and E3 2011. The game was announced as Sticker Star during Nintendo's E3 2012 press conference, alongside New Super Mario Bros. 2 and Luigi's Mansion: Dark Moon, with a release window sometime during the 2012 holiday season. A live gameplay demonstration by Nintendo of America localization manager Nate Bihldorff, one of the writers for Sticker Star's English text, was later shown at the Nintendo 3DS Showcase event, which heavily detailed and elaborated on the sticker-focused gameplay. Nintendo announced that the game would be distributed both physically as a Nintendo 3DS cartridge or downloadable via Nintendo eShop.

=== Scenario ===
The partner system prevalent in previous Paper Mario titles was removed by the developers because it often conflicted with the sticker-focused gameplay and mechanics. Additionally, the developers were asked by Shigeru Miyamoto to "complete [the game] with only characters from the Super Mario world." Miyamoto asked the developers to change the gameplay and battles, as he considered them to be too similar to The Thousand-Year Door. He requested the developers to greatly de-emphasise the game's story, saying that "It's fine without a story, so do we really need one?" Producer Kensuke Tanabe further elaborated on how less than one percent of players found the storyline in Super Paper Mario interesting, according to a survey on Club Nintendo. Taro Kudo, the game's lead writer, determined that the game did not need a complex story to "drive the action". As a Nintendo 3DS title, Sticker Star was intended to be played in short bursts; the episodic narrative and the world map and level system were implemented so that players could easily stop and resume play at any time.

=== Characters ===
In developer interviews for the 2020 title Paper Mario: The Origami King, Tanabe stated that starting with Sticker Star, they were told by Nintendo that they were not allowed to graphically represent Toads with individual characteristics such as age or gender. Due to this, focus was shifted much more towards text, as it allowed the developers to express personality. In a 2012 interview of "Iwata Asks", Satoru Iwata suggested that traits and personality were rather a product of function and gameplay.

== Reception ==
Reception

Aggregate score
Aggregator	Score
Metacritic	75/100

Review scores
Publication	Score
1Up.com	A−
Destructoid	8/10
Edge	8/10
Electronic Gaming Monthly	6.5/10
Eurogamer	7/10
Famitsu	36/40
Game Informer	8.75/10
GameSpot	7.5/10
GamesRadar+	4.5/5
IGN	8.3/10
Nintendo Life	8/10
Nintendo World Report	7.5/10
Official Nintendo Magazine	83%
VentureBeat	68/100

Sticker Star received "generally favorable reviews", according to review aggregator Metacritic. In Japan, four critics from Famitsu gave the game a total score of 36 out of 40, with each critic giving the game a 9 out of 10. The game sold 402,000 copies in Japan in 2012. As of March 31, 2013, the game has 1,970,000 worldwide sales. The Academy of Interactive Arts & Sciences awarded Sticker Star with "Handheld Game of the Year" during their 16th Annual D.I.C.E. Awards ceremony.

The introduction of stickers received mixed reception; critics liked the strategy of managing stickers on hand. Philip Kollar of Polygon called the combat engaging, and like how each battle had its own gimmick that invoked logic deduction. Conversely, Jeff Grubb of VentureBeat criticized the use of stickers due to a lack of inventory space, being forced to hold onto certain stickers for later, and constant backtracking to retrieve unobtainable stickers. Jeremy Parish of 1UP praised Sticker Star's playability, saying that it "goes a long way to offset the moments at which your forward momentum grinds to a halt and you're forced to traipse through old haunts for some arbitrary fetch quest." The use of Things received negative reception, criticized for being out of place and their function in game being a necessity. They were considered one of the game's weaknesses, criticized for inevitable backtracking and only having one solution for each puzzle.

Graphics and worldbuilding were praised, and were compared to the likes of Super Mario 3D Land. The game was noted as being just as unique as previous games in the franchise, with Electronic Gaming Monthly stating how the "3D-effect only enhances the visuals further". The characters were also praised for their charm and "offbeat" naturalism, however they were also criticized for lack of variety in visual design as well as the abundance of Toads instead of the diverse fictional races the series had been known for.

Many critics reacted negatively to the removal of multiple role-playing game (RPG) elements, including the lack of character progression with experience points (XP). GamesRadar+ liked the change from traditional RPG content, but believed there was "not enough of an RPG for genre buffs". Additionally, critics were disappointed in the minimal story, but the comedic writing was praised; Paste reviewer Casey Malone believed the game "stands out as genuinely funny compared to most other games".

Other complaints came from a lack of difficulty in standard combat. Critics found regular encountered battles to have little to no difficulty at all, with Eurogamer reviewer Rich Stanton believing that he "[wasn't] killed by a normal enemy once". On the contrary, boss battles were considered overly difficult, being called a "nightmare", "ridiculous", and "inevitable".
