= Eco Shooter: Plant 530 =

2009 video game

- Developer: Intelligent Systems
- Publisher: Nintendo
- Platform: Wii (WiiWare)
- Release: JP: November 24, 2009; NA: December 21, 2009; EU: January 29, 2010
- Genre: Light-gun shooter
- Modes: Single-player, multiplayer

Eco Shooter: Plant 530, known as 530 Eco Shooter (530 エコシューター, 530 Eko Shūtā) in Japan and Europe, is a light-gun shooter video game developed by Intelligent Systems and published by Nintendo for the Wii's WiiWare service. It was first released in Japan on November 24, 2009, and later released in North America on December 21, 2009 and in Europe on January 29, 2010.

== Gameplay ==
Eco Shooter: Plant 530 is a light-gun shooter where players utilize the Wii Zapper to shoot down robots made of metal cans. Each shot requires a set amount of Gun Energy, which can be obtained by vacuuming up energy spheres, defeating enemies or destroying oil drums; the vacuum can overheat if the button is held for too long. Shooting targets in succession is counted as combos. Each level ends with the player facing a special boss character. A challenge mode is available after clearing the game's three chapters, in which the Gun Energy does not refill automatically in-between chapters.

== Reception ==
Reception

Aggregate score
Aggregator	Score
Metacritic	56/100

Review scores
Publication	Score
Eurogamer	5/10
IGN	7/10
Jeuxvideo.com	10/20
NGamer	40%
Nintendo Life	7/10
Official Nintendo Magazine	40%
Teletext GameCentral	6/10

The game received "mixed" reviews according to the review aggregation website Metacritic. Sean Aaron of Nintendo Life praised the graphics, novel concept and the game's utilization of the Wii Zapper, but criticized its extremely short length. Keza MacDonald of Eurogamer was less positive, noting its lack of variety and short length to be detrimental to the game's experience.
