= Dillon's Rolling Western =

2012 video game

- Developer: Vanpool
- Publisher: Nintendo
- Director: Jun Tsuda
- Producer: Kensuke Tanabe
- Artist: Shingo Kabaya
- Composer: Kiyoshi Hazemoto
- Series: Dillon
- Platform: Nintendo 3DS
- Release: February 22, 2012
- Genres: Action-adventure, tower defense

Dillon's Rolling Western, known in Japan as The Rolling Western (ザ・ローリング・ウエスタン, Za Rōringu Uesutan), is a downloadable video game developed by Vanpool and published by Nintendo for the Nintendo 3DS. It is the first game in the Dillon series. Released exclusively through the system's Nintendo eShop online storefront, the game features Dillon, an anthropomorphic armadillo who must defend frontier villages from walking rock-like monsters. Dillon's Rolling Western combines elements of 3D exploration, action sequences and tower defense and was first unveiled at E3 2011 as The Rolling Western.

On February 14, 2013, Nintendo announced via a Nintendo Direct in North America that the game was to be followed up by a sequel to be released in the following April, entitled Dillon's Rolling Western: The Last Ranger.

On September 13, 2017, Nintendo of Japan announced via a Nintendo Direct a new installment for the Nintendo 3DS called The Dead Heat Breakers (ザ・デッドヒートブレイカーズ, Za Deddo Hīto Bureikāzu). On March 8, 2018 via a Nintendo Direct, the game was revealed to be localized as Dillon's Dead-Heat Breakers. The game was released on April 26, 2018 in Japan, and was later released on May 24 in North America and May 25 in Europe. It is the first game in the series to receive a physical release, but only in Japan and Europe. In North America, it remains a Nintendo eShop exclusive, like the previous installments.

The game's protagonist, Dillon, is featured in the games Super Smash Bros. for Nintendo 3DS and Wii U and Super Smash Bros. Ultimate as an Assist Trophy.

== Gameplay ==
Dillon, an armadillo, is a ranger charged with protecting villages from nightly invasions of walking rock-like monsters called Grocks. The Grocks attack the villages to feed on Scrogs, the residents' livestock. While Dillon is able to attack Grocks by rolling into them, the Grocks can sometimes outnumber Dillon. Thus, the villages have established defense towers that can be outfitted with weapons that will attack Grocks whenever they are in range. To get guns, Dillon must buy them, and sometimes he may have to build the gun tower first. In order to improve the villages' defenses, Dillon must collect materials by exploring mines and defeating Grocks; the materials can then be used to build stronger doors for the village. The stronger a door is, the more difficult it is for a Grock to get in.

== Reception ==
Reception

Aggregate score
Aggregator	Score
Metacritic	65/100

Review scores
Publication	Score
Destructoid	4/10
Edge	5/10
Game Informer	8/10
GamesMaster	42%
IGN	8/10
NGamer	62%
Nintendo Life	7/10
Nintendo World Report	5.5/10
Official Nintendo Magazine	87%
Pocket Gamer	3.5/5
Metro	4/10

The game received "mixed" reviews according to the review aggregation website Metacritic.
