= Dillon's Rolling Western: The Last Ranger =

2013 video game

- Developer: Vanpool
- Publisher: Nintendo
- Director: Jun Tsuda
- Producer: Kensuke Tanabe
- Composer: Kiyoshi Hazemoto
- Series: Dillon
- Platform: Nintendo 3DS
- Release: JP: April 10, 2013; NA: April 11, 2013; PAL: June 27, 2013
- Genres: Action-adventure, tower defense

Dillon's Rolling Western: The Last Ranger, known in Japan as The Rolling Western: Saigo no Yōjinbō (ザ・ローリング・ウエスタン 最後の用心棒, Za Rōringu Uesutan: Saigo no Yōjinbō), is a downloadable video game developed by Vanpool and published by Nintendo for the Nintendo 3DS. It is the sequel to the video game Dillon's Rolling Western released a year earlier on the Nintendo 3DS.

== Gameplay ==
Similar to the first game, the game features the armadillo ranger Dillon, traveling from town to town with his sidekick Russ. The towns are periodically under attack by walking rocklike monsters called Grocks, which Dillon must intercept and prevent from eating the sheeplike Scrogs.

The gameplay is separated into three phases. First Dillon can collect resources and treasures on the outskirts of town, using whatever he can find to fortify walls of the town, build and repair towers, and generate new Scrogs. Dillon's sidekick Russ informs players at the end of the day where the second phase begins. In this phase, Dillon must roll into the Grocks attacking the town, which opens up a battle screen that sees him taking down smaller monsters and bosses one by one. When all of the rock monsters are gone the third phase of the game begins, where Dillon can enter the town's saloon to take on side-quests, review the results of the day, and save the game.

== Reception ==
Reception

Aggregate score
Aggregator	Score
Metacritic	68/100

Review scores
Publication	Score
Destructoid	7.5/10
Game Informer	7.75/10
GameRevolution	7/10
GamesMaster	60%
IGN	6.7/10
Nintendo Life	6/10
Nintendo World Report	8.5/10
Official Nintendo Magazine	66%
Pocket Gamer	3/5

Like the first game, the game received "average" reviews according to the review aggregation website Metacritic.

Jonathan Holmes of Destructoid praised the setting, performance and controls of the game, but found it to be repetitive and overly simplistic at times. Lucas M. Thomas of IGN criticized the lack of innovation compared to the previous game, as well as the bad A.I. pathfinding and simplistic minigames. Philip J Reed of Nintendo Life praised the setting and the lighthearted story of the game, but criticized the lack of improvements compared to the first game, and compared the game to a "game-length DLC" which offers "exactly the same experience" as the first game with none of the original faults addressed.
