= List of DSiWare games =

This is a list of games and applications, collectively known as DSiWare, for the Nintendo DSi handheld game console, available for download via the DSi Shop and unplayable on earlier DS models. An update released for the Nintendo 3DS in June 2011 added support for the Nintendo eShop service, which contained nearly the entire DSi Shop library of DSiWare games at the time, with the exception of certain games and applications. DSiWare games and applications typically have animated icons, but some of them, such as Bejeweled Twist, have static icons. The DSi Shop ceased activity on March 31, 2017. Despite the fact that the DSiWare games and apps on the Nintendo eShop were not affected, they became publicly unavailable due to the eShop's closure on March 27, 2023. The last DSiWare software title was WarioWare: Touched! DL which was released in the United States on March 31, 2016.

== Games ==
There were 632 games released on the DSiWare platform.

Title	Publisher	Japan	North America	Europe	Australia
1001 BlockBusters	Selectsoft	Unreleased	October 13, 2011	March 8, 2012	Unreleased
1001 Crystal Mazes Collection	Teyon	Unreleased	May 3, 2010	December 10, 2010	Unreleased
101 Dolphin Pets	Teyon	Unreleased	January 31, 2011	February 11, 2011	Unreleased
101 MiniGolf World	Teyon	Unreleased	March 15, 2010	December 17, 2010	Unreleased
101 Pinball World	Teyon	Unreleased	January 12, 2012	August 9, 2012	Unreleased
101 Shark Pets	Teyon	Unreleased	July 5, 2010	January 21, 2011	Unreleased
16 Shot! Shooting Watch	Hudson Soft	April 28, 2010	June 14, 2010	July 9, 2010	July 9, 2010
18th Gate	Circle Entertainment	Unreleased	Unreleased	October 18, 2012	October 18, 2012
1950s Lawn Mower Kids	Zordix	Unreleased	November 3, 2011	September 1, 2011	September 1, 2011
1st Class Poker & BlackJack	GameOn	Unreleased	March 22, 2012	March 15, 2012	Unreleased
24/7 Solitaire	GameOn	Unreleased	July 12, 2010	June 25, 2010	Unreleased
200V Mahjong Challenge Spirits	Tasuke	September 9, 2009	Unreleased	Unreleased	Unreleased
21: Blackjack	Digital Leisure	Unreleased	November 15, 2010	December 1, 2011	Unreleased
2Puzzle It: Fantasy	Neuland Multimedia	Unreleased	Unreleased	July 7, 2011	Unreleased
3 Heroes Crystal Soul	Circle Entertainment	Unreleased	Unreleased	Unreleased	February 23, 2012
3-bun Tenkatouitsu: Bakumatsu Quiz-Hen	GAE	September 22, 2010	Unreleased	Unreleased	Unreleased
3-pun Tenkatouitsu: Higashinippon Sengoku Quiz-Hen	GAE	February 24, 2010	Unreleased	Unreleased	Unreleased
3-pun Tenkatouitsu: Nishinippon Sengoku Quiz-Hen	GAE	February 24, 2010	Unreleased	Unreleased	Unreleased
3,2,1...WordsUp!	GameOn	Unreleased	July 5, 2012	August 2, 2012	Unreleased
3450 Algo	Comolink	March 16, 2011	Unreleased	Unreleased	Unreleased
3D Mahjong	GameOn	Unreleased	August 16, 2010	August 20, 2010	Unreleased
3D Twist & Match	Sanuk Games	Unreleased	August 16, 2010	May 23, 2011	Unreleased
4 Travellers: Play French	Agenius Interactive	Unreleased	July 12, 2010	July 16, 2010	July 16, 2010
4 Travellers: Play Spanish	Agenius Interactive	Unreleased	March 8, 2010	March 12, 2010	March 5, 2010
40-in-1 Explosive Megamix	Nordcurrent	Unreleased	January 19, 2012	February 9, 2012	Unreleased
5 in 1 Mahjong	cerasus.media	Unreleased	March 14, 2011	March 18, 2011	Unreleased
5 in 1 Solitaire	Digital Leisure	Unreleased	February 1, 2010	July 16, 2010	Unreleased
505 Tangram	Cosmigo	May 1, 2013	February 7, 2011	July 7, 2011	Unreleased
7 Card Games	cerasus.media	Unreleased	April 12, 2010	Unreleased	Unreleased
90's Pool	Cinemax	Unreleased	March 9, 2012	August 9, 2012	Unreleased
99Bullets	EnjoyUp Games	May 30, 2012	May 23, 2011	July 21, 2011	Unreleased
99Moves	EnjoyUp Games	Unreleased	January 31, 2013	July 4, 2013	Unreleased
99Seconds	EnjoyUp Games	Unreleased	May 31, 2012	July 12, 2012	Unreleased
A Fairy Tale	Lemon Team	Unreleased	Unreleased	Unreleased	June 30, 2011
A Kappa's Trail	Nintendo	December 9, 2009	June 14, 2010	Unreleased	Unreleased
A Topsy Turvy Life: The Turvys Strike Back; Are? DS ga Sakasa desu kedo. Gyaku Shooting^{JP}	Tecmo	February 3, 2010	May 31, 2010	June 11, 2010	Unreleased
A Topsy Turvy Life: Turvy Drops; Are? DS ga Sakasa desu kedo. Sakasa Drops^{JP}	Tecmo	February 3, 2010	May 17, 2010	June 4, 2010	Unreleased
Aahh! Spot the Difference; Atta! Spot the Difference^{JP}	Tecmo	October 3, 2012	March 1, 2012	March 22, 2010	Unreleased
Absolute Baseball at Sports! Pro Yakyuu 2010^{JP}	TASUKE	June 9, 2010	April 4, 2011	Unreleased	Unreleased
Absolute BrickBuster at Enta! Block Kuzushi^{JP}	TASUKE	April 21, 2010	July 26, 2010	Unreleased	Unreleased
Absolute Chess atChess Challenge Spirits^{JP}	TASUKE	January 13, 2010	August 9, 2010	Unreleased	Unreleased
Absolute Reversi at Enta! Taisen Reversi^{JP}	TASUKE	May 26, 2010	August 23, 2010	Unreleased	Unreleased
Abyss (Note: Not available on 3DS eShop)	EnjoyUp Games	May 26, 2010	August 23, 2012	Unreleased	Unreleased
Academy: Checkers	Gamelion	Unreleased	October 27, 2011	October 20, 2011	Unreleased
Academy: Chess Puzzles	Gamelion	Unreleased	October 4, 2012	December 27, 2012	Unreleased
Academy: Tic-Tac-Toe^{NA} Academy: Tic-Tac-Toe - Noughts and Crosses^{EU, PAL}	Gamelion	Unreleased	October 18, 2010	October 15, 2010	October 15, 2010
Accel Knights: Imashi ga Tame Ware wa Tsurugi o Toru	ArtePiazza	October 6, 2010	Unreleased	Unreleased	Unreleased
Ace Mathician	Circle Entertainment	Unreleased	Unreleased	Unreleased	August 2, 2012
Advanced Circuits	BiP media	Unreleased	Unreleased	Unreleased	June 11, 2010
Adventure in Vegas: Slot Machine	Gamelion	March 6, 2013	November 8, 2010	January 7, 2011	January 7, 2011
Afterzoom^{NA} Micro no Seimeitai^{JP}	Abylight	July 14, 2011	July 21, 2011	October 15, 2010	Unreleased
Ah! Heaven	Circle Entertainment	Unreleased	February 7, 2013	April 4, 2013	Unreleased
Ah! Nikakutori	Acute Entertainment, Inc.	March 17, 2010	Unreleased	Unreleased	Unreleased
Ai... Sengoku Spirits EX: Gunshiden	TASUKE	April 13, 2011	Unreleased	Unreleased	Unreleased
Ai... Sengoku Spirits EX: Moushouden	TASUKE	May 11, 2011	Unreleased	Unreleased	Unreleased
Ai... Sengoku Spirits EX: Shukunden	TASUKE	April 13, 2011	Unreleased	Unreleased	Unreleased
Ai...Sengoku Spirits Gaiden: Hideyoshi-Hen	TASUKE	May 19, 2010	Unreleased	Unreleased	Unreleased
Ai...Sengoku Spirits Gaiden: Kenshin-Hen	TASUKE	June 2, 2010	Unreleased	Unreleased	Unreleased
Ai...Sengoku Spirits Gaiden: Nobunaga-Hen	TASUKE	May 19, 2010	Unreleased	Unreleased	Unreleased
AiRace	QubicGames	Unreleased	April 12, 2010	May 14, 2010	May 14, 2010
AiRace: Tunnel	QubicGames	Unreleased	January 25, 2010	April 2, 2010	April 2, 2010
Airport Mania: First Flight	Lemon Team	Unreleased	Unreleased	Unreleased	June 16, 2011
Airport Mania: Non-Stop Flights	Lemon Team	Unreleased	Unreleased	Unreleased	July 14, 2011
Aishite Iruka: Aisarete Iruka	Starfish	July 21, 2010	Unreleased	Unreleased	Unreleased
Aitakute Monkey	Starfish	April 20, 2011	Unreleased	Unreleased	Unreleased
Akumu no Youkai Mura	Sonic Powered	July 27, 2011	Unreleased	Unreleased	Unreleased
Alien Puzzle Adventure	Mastertronic	Unreleased	Unreleased	Unreleased	January 14, 2011
All-Star Air Hockey	Skyworks Interactive	Unreleased	January 31, 2011	Unreleased	Unreleased
AlphaBounce	Mad Monkey Studio	Unreleased	April 12, 2010	April 9, 2010	April 9, 2010
Alt-Play: Jason Rohrer Anthology	Sabarasa	Unreleased	January 3, 2011	December 31, 2010	Unreleased
Amakuchi! Dairoujou	Kawamoto Sangou	October 14, 2009	Unreleased	Unreleased	Unreleased
American Popstar: Road to Celebrity; Idol * Nights^{JP} Pop Superstar: Road to Celebrity^{EU}	Gameloft	February 24, 2010	May 25, 2009	May 22, 2009	May 22, 2009
Amida's Path	Collavier	Unreleased	August 14, 2014	Unreleased	Unreleased
Amoebattle	Intrinsic Games	Unreleased	May 3, 2012	Unreleased	Unreleased
Ancient Tribe	Circle Entertainment	Unreleased	June 28, 2010	January 28, 2011	Unreleased
Animal Color Cross	Little Worlds Studio	Unreleased	June 28, 2010	May 28, 2010	Unreleased
Animal Puzzle Adventure	Arc System Works	June 24, 2009	January 4, 2010	January 4, 2010	August 6, 2010
Anonymous Notes: Chapter 1 - From the Abyss^{NA} Anonymous Notes: Daiishou - From the Abyss^{JP}	Sonic Powered	February 10, 2010	April 4, 2011	September 8, 2011	Unreleased
Anonymous Notes: Chapter 2 - From the Abyss^{NA} Anonymous Notes: Dainishou - From the Abyss^{JP}	Sonic Powered	March 31, 2010	May 2, 2011	September 22, 2011	Unreleased
Anonymous Notes: Chapter 3 - From the Abyss^{NA} Anonymous Notes Dai-San-Shou: From the Abyss^{JP}	Sonic Powered	June 20, 2012	December 20, 2012	Unreleased	Unreleased
Anonymous Notes: Chapter 4 - From the Abyss^{NA} Anonymous Notes Dai-Yon-Shou: From the Abyss^{JP}	Sonic Powered	December 11, 2013	June 26, 2014	Unreleased	Unreleased
Ante Up: Texas Hold'em	MonkeyPaw Games	Unreleased	January 24, 2011	Unreleased	Unreleased
Antipole	Saturnine Games	Unreleased	July 21, 2011	December 29, 2011	December 29, 2011
Anyohaseyo! Kankokugo World Puzzle	IE Institute	July 14, 2010	Unreleased	Unreleased	Unreleased
Arcade Bowling	Skyworks Interactive	Unreleased	November 16, 2009	Unreleased	Unreleased
Arcade Hoops Basketball	Skyworks Interactive	Unreleased	December 28, 2009	Unreleased	Unreleased
Arctic Escape	Teyon	November 14, 2012	February 21, 2011	March 18, 2011	Unreleased
Armada	Zoo Games	Unreleased	October 18, 2010	Unreleased	Unreleased
Armageddon Operation Dragon	EnjoyUp Games	Unreleased	May 2, 2013	June 20, 2013	Unreleased
Army Defender	Mindscape	Unreleased	December 7, 2009	November 20, 2009	Unreleased
Arrow of Laputa	ArtePiazza	November 24, 2011	Unreleased	Unreleased	Unreleased
Art of Ink	Sabarasa	Unreleased	April 11, 2011	June 14, 2012	Unreleased
Art Style: Aquite^{EU, AUS} Aquia^{NA}	Nintendo	December 24, 2008	April 5, 2009	April 3, 2009	April 2, 2009
Art Style: Base 10^{NA} Code^{EU, AUS}	Nintendo	December 24, 2008	July 6, 2009	April 3, 2009	April 2, 2009
Art Style: Boxlife^{EU, AUS, NA} Hacolife^{JP}	Nintendo	February 25, 2009	June 22, 2009	July 10, 2009	July 10, 2009
Art Style: Digidrive^{NA} Art Style: Intersect^{EU, AUS}	Nintendo	November 4, 2009	November 16, 2009	October 2, 2009	October 2, 2009
Art Style: PiCTOBiTS^{NA} Pictopict^{EU, AUS}	Nintendo	January 28, 2009	May 18, 2009	May 22, 2009	May 22, 2009
Art Style: Precipice^{NA} Kubos^{EU, AUS}	Nintendo	February 25, 2009	August 3, 2009	June 5, 2009	June 5, 2009
Art Style: Zengage^{NA} Nemrem^{EU, AUS}	Nintendo	January 28, 2009	July 20, 2009	May 29, 2009	May 29, 2009
Artillery: Knights vs. Orcs	KRITZELKRATZ 3000 GmbH	Unreleased	Unreleased	July 28, 2011	Unreleased
Asphalt 4: Elite Racing	Gameloft	August 5, 2009	July 6, 2009	June 12, 2009	June 12, 2009
at Enta! Taisen Hanafuda: Koi Koi Kassen	TASUKE	May 26, 2010	Unreleased	Unreleased	Unreleased
at Enta! Taisen Igo	TASUKE	April 21, 2010	Unreleased	Unreleased	Unreleased
at Enta! Taisen Mahjong 2	TASUKE	March 24, 2010	Unreleased	Unreleased	Unreleased
at Enta! Taisen Shogi 2	TASUKE	March 24, 2010	Unreleased	Unreleased	Unreleased
at Kanji Jukugo Game: Kanjukuken Kanshuu	TASUKE	February 24, 2010	Unreleased	Unreleased	Unreleased
at Shogi: Challenge Spirits	TASUKE	October 7, 2009	Unreleased	Unreleased	Unreleased
at Sports! Koushien 2010	TASUKE	June 9, 2010	Unreleased	Unreleased	Unreleased
at Sports! Pro Yakyuu 2011	TASUKE	June 29, 2011	Unreleased	Unreleased	Unreleased
Atama o Yokusuru Anzan DS: Zou no Hana Fuusen	Shingakusha	January 20, 2010	Unreleased	Unreleased	Unreleased
Aura-Aura Climber	Nintendo	November 10, 2010	February 22, 2010	October 1, 2010	October 1, 2010
Ball Fighter	Teyon	Unreleased	December 7, 2009	July 2, 2010	Unreleased
Battle of Giants: Dinosaurs Fight for Survival^{NA} Combat of Giants: Dinosaurs Fight for Survival^{EU}	Ubisoft	Unreleased	March 15, 2010	April 16, 2010	April 16, 2010
Battle of Giants: Dragons Bronze Edition^{NA} Combat of Giants: Dragons - Bronze Edition^{EU}	Ubisoft	Unreleased	November 2, 2009	October 23, 2009	October 23, 2009
Battle of Giants: Mutant Insects Revenge^{NA} Combat of Giants: Mutant Insects - Revenge^{EU, AUS}	Ubisoft	Unreleased	October 28, 2010	October 18, 2010	June 18, 2010
Battle of the Elements	EnjoyUp Games	Unreleased	November 24, 2011	March 15, 2012	Unreleased
Battle Reel Series 01: Reelgun	Rokumendo	November 10, 2010	Unreleased	Unreleased	Unreleased
Battle Reel Series 02: Ao Zakura Okita-Hen	Rokumendo	November 10, 2010	Unreleased	Unreleased	Unreleased
Beach Party Craze	Alawar Entertainment	Unreleased	June 16, 2011	Unreleased	Unreleased
Beauty Academy	Tivola	Unreleased	March 10, 2011	Unreleased	Unreleased
Bejeweled Twist	PopCap Games	December 22, 2010	January 18, 2010	February 25, 2011	February 25, 2011
Big Bass Arcade	Big John Games	Unreleased	May 16, 2011	Unreleased	Unreleased
Bird & Beans; Pyoro^{EU}	Nintendo	December 24, 2008	April 5, 2009	April 3, 2009	April 2, 2009
BlayzBloo: Super Melee Brawlers Battle Royale	Aksys Games	January 27, 2010	August 2, 2010	Unreleased	Unreleased
Blockado-Puzzle Island	Bitfield GmbH	Unreleased	August 18, 2011	Unreleased	Unreleased
Bloons	Hands-On Mobile	Unreleased	May 3, 2010	May 28, 2010	Unreleased
Bloons TD	Digital Goldfish Ltd.	Unreleased	November 10, 2011	December 8, 2011	Unreleased
Bloons TD 4	Digital Goldfish Ltd.	Unreleased	November 29, 2011	March 21, 2013	Unreleased
Boardwalk Ball Toss	Skyworks Interactive	Unreleased	June 30, 2011	Unreleased	Unreleased
Bomberman Blitz	Hudson Soft	October 7, 2009	November 9, 2009	November 6, 2009	November 6, 2009
Bookstore Dream	CIRCLE Ent.	Unreleased	Unreleased	Unreleased	September 13, 2012
Boom Boom Squaries	Gamelion Studios	Unreleased	January 28, 2011	February 7, 2011	Unreleased
Bounce & Break	Enjoy Gaming Ltd.	Unreleased	May 3, 2010	May 7, 2010	Unreleased
Box Pusher	Cosmigo	Unreleased	February 23, 2012	February 23, 2012	Unreleased
Brain Age Express: Arts & Letters^{NA} A Little Bit of... Dr. Kawashima's Brain Training: Arts Edition^{UK, AUS}	Nintendo	December 24, 2008	August 10, 2009	October 23, 2009	October 23, 2009
Brain Age Express: Math^{NA} A Little Bit of... Dr. Kawashima's Brain Training: Maths Edition^{UK, AUS}	Nintendo	December 24, 2008	April 5, 2009	June 19, 2009	June 19, 2009
Brain Age Express: Sudoku^{NA} A Little Bit of... Dr. Kawashima's Brain Training: Sudoku^{EU, AUS}	Nintendo	April 22, 2009	August 17, 2009	July 24, 2009	July 24, 2009
Brain Drain	Enjoy Gaming Ltd.	Unreleased	June 28, 2010	May 14, 2010	Unreleased
Break Tactics	Agetec	August 4, 2010	September 22, 2011	June 6, 2013	Unreleased
Bridge	Cosmigo	Unreleased	September 15, 2011	August 25, 2011	Unreleased
Bugs'N'Balls	EnjoyUp Games	Unreleased	September 29, 2011	November 17, 2011	Unreleased
Bunbun Squares	Teyon	January 9, 2013	Unreleased	Unreleased	Unreleased
Cake Ninja	Cypronia	Unreleased	December 29, 2011	December 15, 2011	Unreleased
Cake Ninja 2	Cypronia	Unreleased	November 1, 2012	November 8, 2012	Unreleased
Cake Ninja: XMAS	Cypronia	Unreleased	December 20, 2012	November 8, 2012	Unreleased
California Super Sports	Cypronia	Unreleased	May 16, 2013	July 4, 2013	Unreleased
Candle Route peakvox: Route Candle!^{JP}	Teyon	December 14, 2011	July 12, 2012	July 26, 2012	Unreleased
Car Jack Streets	Tag Games	Unreleased	March 15, 2010	March 19, 2010	Unreleased
Card Hero: Speed Battle Custom	Nintendo	July 29, 2009	Unreleased	Unreleased	Unreleased
Castle Conqueror; ARC Style: Totsugeki! Castle Attacker^{JP}	Arc System Works	November 17, 2010	September 13, 2010	March 18, 2011	March 18, 2011
Castle Conqueror Against	Circle Entertainment	Unreleased	December 8, 2011	December 2, 2011	Unreleased
Castle Conqueror Heroes	Circle Entertainment	Unreleased	Unreleased	Unreleased	December 22, 2011
Castle Conqueror Heroes 2	Circle Entertainment	Unreleased	Unreleased	Unreleased	June 20, 2013
Castle Conqueror Revolution	Circle Entertainment	Unreleased	Unreleased	Unreleased	December 1, 2011
Castle of Magic	Gameloft	December 16, 2009	November 23, 2009	December 18, 2009	December 18, 2009
Cat Frenzy	Teyon	Unreleased	May 3, 2012	June 7, 2012	Unreleased
Cave Story	Nicalis	November 22, 2011	November 29, 2010	Unreleased	Unreleased
Chess Challenge!	Digital Leisure	Unreleased	May 10, 2010	August 6, 2010	August 6, 2010
Christmas Wonderland	Virtual Playground	Unreleased	December 22, 2011	December 8, 2011	Unreleased
Christmas Wonderland 2	Virtual Playground	Unreleased	December 6, 2012	December 6, 2011	Unreleased
Chronicles of Vampires: Origins	Teyon	Unreleased	December 22, 2011	Unreleased	Unreleased
Chronicles of Vampires: The Awakening	Teyon	Unreleased	May 17, 2012	Unreleased	Unreleased
Chuck E. Cheese's Alien Defense Force	UFO Interactive Games	Unreleased	December 13, 2012	Unreleased	Unreleased
Chuck E. Cheese's Arcade Room	UFO Interactive Games	Unreleased	April 26, 2012	Unreleased	Unreleased
Chuugaku Kihon Eitango World Puzzle	IE Institute	June 24, 2009	Unreleased	Unreleased	Unreleased
Chuukara! Dairoujou	Kawamoto Sangou	September 7, 2011	Unreleased	Unreleased	Unreleased
Clash of Elementalists; Battle of Elemental^{JP}	Teyon	April 27, 2011	April 11, 2013	April 11, 2013	April 11, 2013
Clubhouse Games Express: Card Classics	Nintendo	January 28, 2009	April 27, 2009	October 30, 2009	October 30, 2009
Clubhouse Games Express: Family Favorites	Nintendo	December 24, 2008	September 7, 2009	November 6, 2009	November 6, 2009
Clubhouse Games Express: Strategy Pack	Nintendo	February 25, 2009	September 21, 2009	November 20, 2009	November 20, 2009
Color Commando	Circle Entertainment	Unreleased	April 25, 2013	May 9, 2013	Unreleased
Come On! Dragons	Circle Entertainment	Unreleased	Unreleased	Unreleased	November 1, 2012
Come On! Heroes	Circle Entertainment	Unreleased	Unreleased	Unreleased	January 19, 2012
Cosmo Fighters	Abylight	Unreleased	December 20, 2010	January 7, 2011	Unreleased
Cosmos X2	Saturnine Games	Unreleased	August 30, 2010	September 15, 2011	Unreleased
Crash-Course Domo	Nintendo	Unreleased	October 19, 2009	Unreleased	Unreleased
Crazy Cheebo: Puzzle Party	Cypronia	Unreleased	June 6, 2011	February 9, 2012	Unreleased
Crazy Chicken: Director's Cut	Teyon	Unreleased	November 7, 2013	October 24, 2013	Unreleased
Crazy Chicken: Pirates	Teyon	Unreleased	August 16, 2012	September 27, 2012	Unreleased
Crazy Golf	dtp entertainment	Unreleased	May 3, 2010	Unreleased	July 9, 2010
Crazy Hamster	Gamelion	Unreleased	August 11, 2011	Unreleased	Unreleased
Crazy Hunter	EnjoyUp Games	Unreleased	September 6, 2012	September 6, 2012	Unreleased
Crazy Pinball	dtp entertainment	Unreleased	Unreleased	Unreleased	July 23, 2010
Crazy Sudoku	dtp entertainment	Unreleased	Unreleased	Unreleased	June 4, 2010
Crazy Train	Floor 84 Studio	Unreleased	January 28, 2016	Unreleased	Unreleased
Crystal Adventure	Circle Entertainment	Unreleased	December 6, 2012	January 3, 2013	Unreleased
Crystal Caverns of Amon-Ra	Selectsoft	Unreleased	September 29, 2011	April 12, 2012	Unreleased
Crystal Monsters	Gameloft	Unreleased	Unreleased	July 26, 2010	July 30, 2010
Curling Super Championship	Cypronia	Unreleased	June 7, 2012	May 10, 2012	Unreleased
Cut the Rope	Chillingo	Unreleased	September 22, 2011	September 22, 2011	September 22, 2011
Cute Witch! Runner	EnjoyUp Games	Unreleased	July 25, 2013	October 17, 2013	Unreleased
Dairojo! Samurai Defenders; Karakuchi! Dairoujou^{JP}	Abylight	March 3, 2010	December 6, 2010	Unreleased	Unreleased
Dancing Academy	Tivola Publishing GmbH	Unreleased	Unreleased	March 25, 2011	Unreleased
Dark Void Zero	Capcom	Unreleased	January 18, 2010	March 5, 2010	March 5, 2010
Datamine	EnjoyUp Games	Unreleased	October 8, 2010	October 8, 2010	Unreleased
Date or Ditch	Gameloft	Unreleased	Unreleased	Unreleased	June 25, 2010
Decathlon 2012	Cinemax	Unreleased	July 26, 2012	July 26, 2012	Unreleased
Defense of the Middle Kingdom; ARC Style: San Goku Shi Tower Defense: Doushou Teppeki^{JP}	Aksys Games	July 28, 2010	September 5, 2011	Unreleased	Unreleased
Delbo	Neko Entertainment	March 31, 2010	June 23, 2011	June 23, 2011	June 23, 2011
Dentaku + TCG-You Tool: Duel Dentaku Custom	Tasuke	September 30, 2009	Unreleased	Unreleased	Unreleased
Devil Band - Rock the Underground	Circle Entertainment	Unreleased	Unreleased	Unreleased	June 7, 2012
Digger Dan & Kaboom	Virtual Playground	Unreleased	January 24, 2011	Unreleased	Unreleased
Disney Fireworks	Disney Interactive	Unreleased	March 29, 2010	Unreleased	Unreleased
Divergent Shift	Konami	Unreleased	August 16, 2010	Unreleased	December 17, 2010
DodoGo!	Neko Entertainment	Unreleased	April 26, 2010	March 4, 2010	April 30, 2010
DodoGo! Challenge	Neko Entertainment	Unreleased	Unreleased	Unreleased	November 26, 2010
DodoGo! Robo	Neko Entertainment	Unreleased	Unreleased	Unreleased	March 25, 2011
Don't Cross the Line; Kyoudaisei Higashida Taishi ga Kangaeta Puzzle: Hirameki Emusubi^{JP}	Aksys Games	November 4, 2009	June 7, 2010	Unreleased	Unreleased
Don't Feed the Animals	Electron Jump Games	Unreleased	April 26, 2010	Spring 2010	Unreleased
Doodle Fit	Gamelion Studios	Unreleased	December 22, 2011	January 12, 2012	Unreleased
DotMan	Agetec	Unreleased	September 8, 2011	November 29, 2012	Unreleased
Double Bloob	Bloober Team	Unreleased	December 1, 2011	January 26, 2012	Unreleased
Downtown Texas Hold'em	Electronic Arts	Unreleased	February 1, 2010	February 19, 2010	February 19, 2010
Dr. Mario Express^{NA} A Little Bit of... Dr. Mario^{EU, AUS}	Nintendo	December 24, 2008	April 20, 2009	May 1, 2009	May 1, 2009
Dracula: Undead Awakening	Chillingo Ltd.	Unreleased	March 8, 2010	Unreleased	February 26, 2010
Dragon Quest Wars	Square Enix	June 24, 2009	September 28, 2009	October 9, 2009	October 9, 2009
Dragon's Lair II: Time Warp	Digital Leisure	Unreleased	December 20, 2010	July 7, 2011	July 7, 2011
Dreamwalker	Code Mystics Inc.	Unreleased	June 6, 2011	Unreleased	Unreleased
Drift Street Express	Tantalus	Unreleased	March 22, 2010	Unreleased	August 13, 2010
Earth Saver: Inseki Bakuha Daisakusen	Tom Create	October 28, 2009	Unreleased	Unreleased	Unreleased
Earthworm Jim	Gameloft	June 23, 2010	May 10, 2010	Unreleased	April 23, 2010
Easter Eggztravaganza	Virtual Playground	Unreleased	February 28, 2013	February 28, 2013	Unreleased
EJ Puzzles: Hooked	Electron Jump Games	Unreleased	January 10, 2011	Unreleased	Unreleased
Elemental Masters	lbxgames	Unreleased	March 8, 2010	Unreleased	Unreleased
Escape the Virus: Shoot 'em Up! peakvox: Escape Virus - Shooter Pack^{JP}	Teyon	August 31, 2011	August 30, 2011	August 16, 2011	Unreleased
Escape the Virus: Swarm Survival peakvox: Escape Virus - Normal Pack^{JP}	Teyon	August 4, 2011	June 28, 2012	July 5, 2012	Unreleased
Escape Trick: Convenience Store; The Misshitsukara no Dasshutsu: Nankoku no Conveni^{JP}	Intense	October 27, 2010	November 17, 2011	April 19, 2012	Unreleased
Escape Trick: Ninja Castle; The Misshitsukara no Dasshutsu: Karakuri Yashiki^{JP}	Intense	July 21, 2010	September 22, 2011	December 15, 2012	Unreleased
Escape Trick: The Secret of Rock City Prison; The Misshitsukara no Dasshutsu: Prison Break^{JP}	Intense	March 24, 2010	April 11, 2011	November 24, 2012	Unreleased
Escapee GO!	Gevo Entertainment	Unreleased	January 25, 2010	Unreleased	Unreleased
Everyday Soccer; Arc Style: Everyday Football^{JP}	Arc System Works	June 16, 2010	September 20, 2010	Unreleased	December 17, 2010
Extreme Hangman	Gamelion	Unreleased	February 8, 2010	July 2, 2010	July 2, 2010
Extreme Hangman 2	Gamelion	Unreleased	July 14, 2011	Unreleased	October 6, 2011
Face Pilot	Nintendo	July 28, 2010	July 26, 2010	June 18, 2010	June 18, 2010
Famicom Wars DS: Lost Light	Nintendo	October 30, 2013	Unreleased	Unreleased	Unreleased
Fantasy Slots: Adventure Slots and Games	Big John Games	Unreleased	December 27, 2010	Unreleased	Unreleased
Farm Frenzy	Alawar Entertainment	Unreleased	July 7, 2011	Unreleased	Unreleased
Ferrari GT Evolution	Gameloft	June 9, 2010	April 26, 2010	May 21, 2010	May 21, 2010
Ferryman Puzzle	Engine Software	Unreleased	Unreleased	January 28, 2011	Unreleased
Fieldrunners	Subatomic Studios	Unreleased	February 8, 2010	Unreleased	June 11, 2010
Fire Panic	Playtainment	Unreleased	June 7, 2010	May 14, 2010	May 14, 2010
Flametail^{NA} Trailblaze: Puzzle Incinerator^{AUS, EU} Moyasu Puzzle Flametail^{JP}	Nintendo	January 26, 2010	June 7, 2010	September 10, 2010	September 10, 2010
Flight Control	Firemint	Unreleased	February 22, 2010	February 19, 2010	February 19, 2010
Flip the Core	Engine Software	Unreleased	June 28, 2012	July 19, 2012	Unreleased
Flipper	Xform	Unreleased	February 22, 2010	Unreleased	Unreleased
Flipper 2: Flush the Goldfish	Xform	Unreleased	January 26, 2012	Unreleased	Unreleased
Forgotten Legions	Cypronia	Unreleased	March 14, 2013	April 18, 2013	April 18, 2013
Foto Face: The Face Stealer Strikes	Electronic Arts	December 4, 2009	November 30, 2009	December 4, 2009	December 4, 2009
Frenzic	Two Tribes	Unreleased	November 26, 2010	November 29, 2010	Unreleased
Frogger Returns	Konami	Unreleased	May 17, 2010	May 17, 2010	Unreleased
Furry Legends	Gamelion Studios	October 31, 2012	October 13, 2011	November 3, 2011	Unreleased
Fuuun! Dairoujou Kai	Kawamoto Sangou	March 21, 2012	Unreleased	Unreleased	Unreleased
G.G Series AIR PINBALL HOCKEY	Genterprise	Unreleased	June 25, 2015	Unreleased	Unreleased
G.G Series ALL BREAKER	Genterprise	Unreleased	June 11, 2015	Unreleased	Unreleased
G.G Series ALTERED WEAPON	Genterprise	Unreleased	June 4, 2015	Unreleased	Unreleased
G.G Series ASSAULT BUSTER	Genterprise	Unreleased	June 4, 2015	Unreleased	Unreleased
G.G Series BLACK X BLOCK	Genterprise	Unreleased	June 4, 2015	Unreleased	Unreleased
G.G Series CHOU HERO OUGA 2	Genterprise	August 25, 2010	Unreleased	Unreleased	Unreleased
G.G Series CONVEYOR TOY PACKING	Genterprise	Unreleased	June 11, 2015	Unreleased	Unreleased
G.G Series COSMO RALLY	Genterprise	Unreleased	June 4, 2015	Unreleased	Unreleased
G.G Series D-TANK	Genterprise	Unreleased	March 21, 2011	Unreleased	Unreleased
G.G Series DARK SPIRITS	Genterprise	Unreleased	February 7, 2011	Unreleased	Unreleased
G.G Series DRIFT CIRCUIT	Genterprise	Unreleased	February 21, 2011	Unreleased	Unreleased
G.G Series DRIFT CIRCUIT 2	Genterprise	Unreleased	October 13, 2011	Unreleased	Unreleased
G.G Series DRILLING ATTACK!!	Genterprise	Unreleased	June 25, 2015	Unreleased	Unreleased
G.G Series ENERGY CHAIN	Genterprise	Unreleased	June 25, 2015	Unreleased	Unreleased
G.G Series EXCITING RIVER	Genterprise	Unreleased	June 4, 2015	Unreleased	Unreleased
G.G Series GREAT WHIP ADVENTURE	Genterprise	Unreleased	June 25, 2015	Unreleased	Unreleased
G.G Series HERO PUZZLE	Genterprise	Unreleased	June 4, 2015	Unreleased	Unreleased
G.G Series HORIZONTAL BAR	Genterprise	Unreleased	March 7, 2011	Unreleased	Unreleased
G.G Series NINJA KARAKURI-DEN	Genterprise	Unreleased	August 23, 2010	Unreleased	Unreleased
G.G Series NINJA KARAKURI-DEN 2	Genterprise	Unreleased	September 8, 2010	Unreleased	Unreleased
G.G Series NYOKKI	Genterprise	Unreleased	June 25, 2015	Unreleased	Unreleased
G.G Series RUN AND STRIKE	Genterprise	Unreleased	June 25, 2015	Unreleased	Unreleased
G.G Series SCORE ATTACKER	Genterprise	Unreleased	July 16, 2015	Unreleased	Unreleased
G.G Series SHADOW ARMY	Genterprise	Unreleased	June 11, 2015	Unreleased	Unreleased
G.G Series SUPER HERO OGRE	Genterprise	October 11, 2009	October 11, 2010	November 5, 2010	Unreleased
G.G Series THE HIDDEN NINJA KAGEMARU	Genterprise	Unreleased	June 11, 2015	Unreleased	Unreleased
G.G Series THE LAST KNIGHT	Genterprise	Unreleased	June 25, 2015	Unreleased	Unreleased
G.G Series THE SPIKY BLOWFISH!!	Genterprise	Unreleased	June 4, 2015	Unreleased	Unreleased
G.G Series THROW OUT	Genterprise	Unreleased	June 25, 2015	Unreleased	Unreleased
G.G Series VECTOR	Genterprise	Unreleased	July 16, 2015	Unreleased	Unreleased
G.G Series VERTEX	Genterprise	Unreleased	June 25, 2015	Unreleased	Unreleased
G.G Series WONDERLAND	Genterprise	Unreleased	May 28, 2015	Unreleased	Unreleased
G.G Series Z-ONE	Genterprise	Unreleased	September 16, 2009	Unreleased	Unreleased
G.G Series Z-ONE 2	Genterprise	Unreleased	June 23, 2010	Unreleased	Unreleased
Gaia's Moon	EnjoyUp Games	July 25, 2012	January 19, 2012	February 9, 2012	Unreleased
Galaxy Saver	G-STYLE	May 25, 2011	January 3, 2013	Unreleased	Unreleased
Game & Watch Ball	Nintendo	July 15, 2009	April 23, 2010	April 23, 2010	April 23, 2010
Game & Watch Chef	Nintendo	July 29, 2009	March 22, 2010	March 26, 2010	March 2010
Game & Watch Donkey Kong Jr.	Nintendo	August 19, 2009	April 19, 2010	April 23, 2010	April 23, 2010
Game & Watch Flagman	Nintendo	July 15, 2009	April 19, 2010	April 23, 2010	April 23, 2010
Game & Watch Helmet	Nintendo	July 29, 2009	April 5, 2010	April 9, 2010	April 2010
Game & Watch Judge	Nintendo	July 15, 2009	March 22, 2010	March 26, 2010	March 2010
Game & Watch Manhole	Nintendo	August 19, 2009	April 5, 2010	April 9, 2010	April 2010
Game & Watch Mario's Cement Factory	Nintendo	August 19, 2009	March 22, 2010	March 26, 2010	March 2010
Game & Watch Vermin	Nintendo	July 15, 2009	April 5, 2010	April 9, 2010	April 2010
Gangstar 2: Kings of L.A.	Gameloft	Unreleased	April 12, 2010	March 26, 2010	March 26, 2010
Gekitsui-Oh	Genki	March 17, 2010	Unreleased	Unreleased	Unreleased
Gene Labs	FrontLine Studios	Unreleased	November 1, 2010	Unreleased	Unreleased
Ginsei Tsume Shogi	SilverStar	March 16, 2011	Unreleased	Unreleased	Unreleased
Globulos Party	GlobZ	September 15, 2010	March 1, 2010	March 5, 2010	Unreleased
Glory Days: Tactical Defense	odenis studio	Unreleased	January 17, 2011	Unreleased	Unreleased
Glow Artistian	Powerhead Games	Unreleased	December 28, 2009	Unreleased	October 22, 2010
Go Fetch! Inusuki: Go Fetch!^{JP}	Agetec	December 22, 2010	November 15, 2010	Unreleased	Unreleased
Go Fetch! 2 Inusuki 2: Go Fetch!^{JP}	Agetec	July 13, 2011	August 4, 2011	Unreleased	Unreleased
GO Series: 10 Second Run	Gamebridge	Unreleased	September 20, 2010	Unreleased	Unreleased
Go Series: Captain Sub	Gamebridge	Unreleased	April 18, 2011	Unreleased	Unreleased
GO Series: Defence Wars	Gamebridge	Unreleased	October 25, 2010	Unreleased	Unreleased
GO Series: Earth Saver	Gamebridge	Unreleased	March 7, 2011	Unreleased	Unreleased
GO Series: Fishing Resort	Gamebridge	Unreleased	September 1, 2011	Unreleased	Unreleased
GO Series: Picdun	Gamebridge	Unreleased	June 6, 2011	Unreleased	Unreleased
GO Series: Pinball Attack!	Gamebridge	Unreleased	November 8, 2010	Unreleased	Unreleased
GO Series: Portable Shrine Wars	Gamebridge	Unreleased	July 28, 2011	Unreleased	Unreleased
GO Series: Tower of Deus	Gamebridge	Unreleased	May 9, 2011	Unreleased	Unreleased
GO Series: Undead Storm	Gamebridge	Unreleased	February 2, 2012	Unreleased	Unreleased
Go! Go! Island Rescue!	Connect2Media	Unreleased	Unreleased	Unreleased	October 29, 2010
Go! Go! Kokopolo	Tanukii Studios Ltd	May 30, 2012	August 11, 2011	August 4, 2011	Unreleased
Gold Fever	TikGames	Unreleased	Unreleased	Unreleased	February 4, 2011
Goony	Circle Entertainment	Unreleased	Unreleased	Unreleased	March 14, 2013
Goooooal America; Goooooal Europa 2012^{EU}	Cinemax	Unreleased	June 21, 2012	December 27, 2012	Unreleased
Guitar Rock Tour	Gameloft	Unreleased	August 17, 2009	July 31, 2009	July 31, 2009
Hachi-One Diver DS Story	SilverStar	March 17, 2010	Unreleased	Unreleased	Unreleased
Hachi-One Diver DS: Naruzou-kun Hasami Shogi	SilverStar	February 24, 2010	Unreleased	Unreleased	Unreleased
Hakokoro	AMZY	October 6, 2010	Unreleased	Unreleased	Unreleased
Halloween: Trick or Treat	Virtual Playground	Unreleased	October 27, 2011	October 27, 2011	Unreleased
Handy Hockey	ITL	July 7, 2010	Unreleased	Unreleased	Unreleased
Handy Mahjong	ITL	November 4, 2009	Unreleased	Unreleased	Unreleased
Happy Birthday Mart	Pixel Federation	Unreleased	July 19, 2010	Unreleased	Unreleased
Hard-Hat Domo	Nintendo	Unreleased	October 19, 2009	Unreleased	Unreleased
Hearts Spades Euchre	Cosmigo	Unreleased	June 30, 2011	Unreleased	Unreleased
Hell's Kitchen Vs.	Ludia	Unreleased	January 4, 2010	December 11, 2009	Unreleased
Hello Flowerz	Virtual Toys	Unreleased	Unreleased	Unreleased	June 25, 2010
Hero of Sparta	Gameloft	July 7, 2010	Unreleased	Unreleased	May 28, 2010
Hidden Expedition Titanic	MSL	Unreleased	Unreleased	Unreleased	February 6, 2014
High Stakes Texas Hold'em	Hudson Soft	Unreleased	Unreleased	Unreleased	January 1, 2010
Himitsu no Oooku	Hudson Soft	August 19, 2009	Unreleased	Unreleased	Unreleased
Hints Hunter	Circle Entertainment	Unreleased	August 2, 2010	March 29, 2012	Unreleased
Hooked on Bass Fishing	Gamebridge	Unreleased	December 5, 2013	December 5, 2012	Unreleased
Hospital Havoc	Hands-On Mobile	Unreleased	July 19, 2010	August 20, 2010	Unreleased
Hot and Cold: A 3D Hidden Object Adventure	Majesco	Unreleased	December 21, 2009	Unreleased	Unreleased
I Must Run!	Gamelion Studios	August 29, 2012	April 12, 2012	April 19, 2012	Unreleased
Ice Hockey Slovakia 2011	Cypronia	Unreleased	Unreleased	April 29, 2011	Unreleased
Ichimoudaijin! Neko King	Tom Create	October 7, 2009	Unreleased	Unreleased	Unreleased
Ide Yousuke’s Healthy Mahjong DSi	Nintendo	February 25, 2009	Unreleased	Unreleased	Unreleased
Ike! Ike!! Hamster	Tom Create	April 21, 2010	Unreleased	Unreleased	Unreleased
Ikibago	Neko Entertainment	Unreleased	Unreleased	Unreleased	May 6, 2011
Illustlogic	Hudson Soft	April 15, 2009	Unreleased	Unreleased	Unreleased
Illust Logic+ Nihon no Mukashi Banashi	Hudson Soft	September 30, 2009	Unreleased	Unreleased	Unreleased
Invasion of the Alien Blobs! Shunkan Tsubu Tsubu Tsubushi^{JP}	G-STYLE	March 3, 2010	November 29, 2012	Unreleased	Unreleased
iSpot Japan	EnjoyUp Games	Unreleased	February 16, 2012	August 30, 2012	Unreleased
Ivy the Kiwi? Mini	Bandai Namco Games	April 21, 2010	October 11, 2010	November 19, 2010	Unreleased
Jaseiken Necromancer: Nightmare Reborn	Hudson Soft	June 16, 2010	Unreleased	Unreleased	Unreleased
Jazzy Billiards	Arc System Works	January 11, 2010	January 11, 2010	January 11, 2010	September 3, 2010
JellyCar 2	Disney Interactive Studios	Unreleased	March 7, 2011	Unreleased	Unreleased
Jewel Keepers: Easter Island	Nordcurrent	Unreleased	July 7, 2011	July 7, 2011	Unreleased
Joshikou Dash	Mechanic Arms	March 21, 2012	Unreleased	Unreleased	Unreleased
Jump Trials; Shunkan Jump Kentei^{JP}	G-STYLE	July 14, 2010	November 15, 2012	Unreleased	Unreleased
Jump Trials Extreme; Motto! Shunkan Jump Kentei^{JP}	G-STYLE	December 21, 2011	December 27, 2012	Unreleased	Unreleased
Just Sing! 80s Collection	DTP Entertainment	Unreleased	July 14, 2011	June 23, 2011	Unreleased
Just Sing! Christmas Songs	Engine Software	Unreleased	December 4, 2009	December 13, 2009	Unreleased
Just Sing! Christmas Songs Vol. 2	DTP Entertainment	Unreleased	December 10, 2010	December 20, 2010	Unreleased
Just Sing! Christmas Songs Vol. 3	DTP Entertainment	Unreleased	December 15, 2011	November 24, 2011	Unreleased
Just Sing! National Anthems	DTP Entertainment	Unreleased	May 28, 2010	May 28, 2010	Unreleased
Kamenin Merchant!	Bandai Namco Games	December 2, 2009	Unreleased	Unreleased	Unreleased
Kart Krashers	Big John Games	Unreleased	September 27, 2012	Unreleased	Unreleased
Katamuku + Action: Katamukushon	Hi Corp	December 24, 2009	Unreleased	Unreleased	Unreleased
Katanuki	G-mode	November 25, 2009	Unreleased	Unreleased	Unreleased
Kemonomix	Rocket Studio	August 4, 2010	Unreleased	Unreleased	Unreleased
Kenshou Tsuki Puzzle IroIro: Gekkan Crossword House Vol. 1	Nintendo	May 27, 2009	Unreleased	Unreleased	Unreleased
Kenshou Tsuki Puzzle IroIro: Gekkan Crossword House Vol. 2	Nintendo	July 1, 2009	Unreleased	Unreleased	Unreleased
Kenshou Tsuki Puzzle IroIro: Gekkan Crossword House Vol. 3	Nintendo	July 29, 2009	Unreleased	Unreleased	Unreleased
Kenshou Tsuki Puzzle IroIro: Gekkan Crossword House Vol. 4	Nintendo	September 2, 2009	Unreleased	Unreleased	Unreleased
Kenshou Tsuki Puzzle IroIro: Gekkan Crossword House Vol. 5	Nintendo	September 30, 2009	Unreleased	Unreleased	Unreleased
Kenshou Tsuki Puzzle IroIro: Gekkan Crossword House Vol. 6	Nintendo	October 28, 2009	Unreleased	Unreleased	Unreleased
Knockout Peoples: Chotto Zankoku na Hakurankai	Barnhouse Effect	August 18, 2010	Unreleased	Unreleased	Unreleased
Korogashi Puzzle Katamari Damacy	Bandai Namco Games	March 25, 2009	Unreleased	Unreleased	Unreleased
Kouenji Joshi Soccer: Aru Seishun no Monogatari	Starfish SD	May 9, 2012	Unreleased	Unreleased	Unreleased
Kung Fu Dragon; Action Game: Tobeyo!! Dragon!^{JP}	Agetec	December 8, 2010	July 21, 2011	Unreleased	Unreleased
Kuniya Burete Sanga Ari: Hills and Rivers Remain	Square Enix	October 28, 2009	Unreleased	Unreleased	Unreleased
Kuuki Yomi DS	G-Mode	March 25, 2009	Unreleased	Unreleased	Unreleased
Legendary Wars: T-Rex Rumble	Interplay	Unreleased	Unreleased	Unreleased	November 12, 2010
Legends of Exidia	Gameloft	April 7, 2010	February 1, 2010	Unreleased	January 29, 2010
Let's Golf	Gameloft	March 10, 2010	March 1, 2010	Unreleased	February 12, 2010
Letter Challenge	Enjoy Gaming	Unreleased	September 12, 2013	Unreleased	Unreleased
Libera Wing	Pixel Federation	Unreleased	March 22, 2010	Unreleased	Unreleased
Link 'n' Launch	Nintendo	November 11, 2009	February 8, 2010	Unreleased	August 6, 2010
Littlest Pet Shop	Electronic Arts	Unreleased	Unreleased	Unreleased	December 18, 2010
Lola's Alphabet Train	BeiZ Ltd.	Unreleased	January 26, 2012	Unreleased	Unreleased
Lola's Fruit Shop Sudoku	BeiZ Ltd.	Unreleased	June 21, 2012	Unreleased	Unreleased
Looksley's Line Up^{NA} Tales in a Box: Hidden shapes in perspective!^{EU} Rittai Kakushie: Attakoreda (Hidden 3D Image: There It Is!)^{JP}	Nintendo	March 3, 2010	May 17, 2010	June 11, 2010	June 11, 2010
Maestro! Green Groove	Neko Entertainment	Unreleased	Unreleased	Unreleased	July 2, 2010
Magical Drop Yurutto	G-mode	July 29, 2009	Unreleased	Unreleased	Unreleased
Magical fantasista	G-mode	November 24, 2010	Unreleased	Unreleased	Unreleased
Magical Whip	Agetec	November 10, 2010	August 25, 2011	November 15, 2012	Unreleased
Magnetic Joe	Subdued Software	Unreleased	February 28, 2011	Unreleased	Unreleased
Mapmap! By Touchi Kentei	Spike	December 9, 2009	Unreleased	Unreleased	Unreleased
Mario vs. Donkey Kong: Minis March Again!	Nintendo	October 7, 2009	June 8, 2009	August 21, 2009	August 21, 2009
Match Up! Professor Lexis's Match Up!^{EU}	Digital Leisure	Unreleased	June 8, 2009	August 21, 2009	Unreleased
Me And My Dogs: Friends Forever	Gameloft	Unreleased	Unreleased	Unreleased	December 25, 2010
Mega Words	Digital Leisure	Unreleased	June 21, 2010	July 30, 2010	Unreleased
Metal Torrent; Aa Mujyou Setsuna^{JP}	Nintendo	September 2, 2009	May 24, 2010	May 7, 2010	May 7, 2010
Miami Nights: Life in the Spotlight	Gameloft	Unreleased	Unreleased	Unreleased	January 1, 2010
Mighty Flip Champs!	WayForward Technologies	Unreleased	June 1, 2009	November 27, 2009	November 27, 2009
Mighty Milky Way	WayForward Technologies	April 30, 2014	May 9, 2011	May 27, 2011	May 27, 2011
Mixed Messages	Activision	Unreleased	April 13, 2009	April 17, 2009	April 17, 2009
Model Academy	Activision	Unreleased	Unreleased	December 14, 2011	Unreleased
Moke Moke	G-STYLE	Unreleased	July 25, 2012	Unreleased	Unreleased
Monster Buster Club	Nordcurrent	Unreleased	February 28, 2011	March 4, 2011	Unreleased
Moto eXtreme	Chillingo	Unreleased	Unreleased	Unreleased	August 18, 2011
Move Your Brain: Rollway Puzzle	Assoria	Unreleased	February 1, 2010	January 8, 2010	Unreleased
Mr. Brain	Square Enix	May 27, 2009	Unreleased	Unreleased	Unreleased
Mr. Driller: Drill Till You Drop	Bandai Namco Games	February 25, 2009	April 5, 2010	April 16, 2010	April 16, 2010
Music on: Learning Piano	Abylight	Unreleased	August 30, 2010	September 24, 2010	Unreleased
Music on: Learning Piano Volume 2	Abylight	Unreleased	April 18, 2011	May 6, 2011	Unreleased
Music on: Playing Piano	Abylight	Unreleased	October 15, 2010	October 18, 2010	Unreleased
My Aquarium: Seven Oceans	Simulation	Unreleased	Unreleased	Unreleased	December 18, 2014
My Asian Farm	BiP media	Unreleased	Unreleased	Unreleased	August 11, 2011
My Australian Farm	BiP media	Unreleased	Unreleased	Unreleased	July 28, 2011
My Exotic Farm	BiP media	Unreleased	Unreleased	Unreleased	September 24, 2010
My Farm	BiP media	Unreleased	Unreleased	Unreleased	September 3, 2010
My Little Restaurant	QubicGames	Unreleased	Unreleased	Unreleased	June 3, 2011
Mysterious Stars: A Fairy Tale	Collavier	Unreleased	July 3, 2014	Unreleased	Unreleased
Mysterious Stars: The Samurai	Collavier	Unreleased	June 26, 2014	Unreleased	Unreleased
Mysterious Stars: The Singer	Collavier	Unreleased	June 19, 2014	Unreleased	Unreleased
Nae-ireun Taxiwang Daeguyeohaeng (King of Taxi Driver)	Cyberfront Korea	2011	Unreleased	Unreleased	Unreleased
Nandoku 500 Kanji Word Puzzle	IE Institute	January 20, 2010	Unreleased	Unreleased	Unreleased
Nazo no Minigame	Mechanic Arms	January 30, 2013	Unreleased	Unreleased	Unreleased
Need for Speed: Nitro-X	Electronic Arts	Unreleased	Unreleased	Unreleased	November 26, 2010
Neko Neko Bakery: Pan de Puzzle Nyo!	Mechanic Arms	December 19, 2012	Unreleased	Unreleased	Unreleased
Neko no Iru Tangram: Neko to Iyashi no Silhouette Puzzle	Jupiter Corporation	October 20, 2010	Unreleased	Unreleased	Unreleased
Neko Reversi	SilverStar	March 14, 2012	Unreleased	Unreleased	Unreleased
New English Training: Learning with Tempo - Advanced Edition; Rizumu de Kitaeru Atarashii Eigo Duke Native Kaiwa Hen^{JP}	Nintendo	May 27, 2009	Unreleased	February 5, 2010	Unreleased
New English Training: Learning with Tempo - Beginners Edition; Rizumu de Kitaeru Atarashii Eigo Duke Yasashii Kaiwa Hen^{JP}	Nintendo	May 27, 2009	Unreleased	February 5, 2010	Unreleased
Nintendoji	Nintendo	April 3, 2013	Unreleased	Unreleased	Unreleased
Noroi no Game: Chi	Square Enix	September 9, 2009	Unreleased	Unreleased	Unreleased
Noroi no Game: Goku	Square Enix	September 9, 2009	Unreleased	Unreleased	Unreleased
Number Battle; Chotto Suujin Taisen^{JP} Sujin Taisen: Number Battles^{EU}	Nintendo	January 28, 2009	August 14, 2009	January 25, 2010	Unreleased
Odekake Takorin	Mechanic Arms	February 12, 2014	Unreleased	Unreleased	Unreleased
Odekake! Earth Seeker	Enterbrain	June 23, 2011	Unreleased	Unreleased	Unreleased
Orion's Odyssey	Enjoy Gaming	Unreleased	December 12, 2013	Unreleased	Unreleased
Oscar in Movieland	Virtual Playground	Unreleased	February 8, 2010	April 2, 2010	April 2, 2010
Oscar in Toyland	Virtual Playground	Unreleased	September 14, 2009	August 28, 2009	September 14, 2009
Oscar in Toyland 2	Virtual Playground	Unreleased	February 14, 2011	January 14, 2011	January 14, 2011
Oscar's World Tour	Virtual Playground	Unreleased	July 28, 2011	August 11, 2011	August 11, 2011
Oshiete Darling	Starfish SD	April 28, 2010	Unreleased	Unreleased	Unreleased
Otegaru Puzzle Series: Yurie to Fushigi na Meikyuu	Arc System Works	February 23, 2011	Unreleased	Unreleased	Unreleased
Othello	Arc System Works	July 29, 2009	Unreleased	Unreleased	Unreleased
Otona no Nihonshi Puzzle	IE Institute	June 30, 2010	Unreleased	Unreleased	Unreleased
Otona no Sekaishi Puzzle	IE Institute	July 28, 2010	Unreleased	Unreleased	Unreleased
Panda Craze	TikGames	Unreleased	Unreleased	Unreleased	February 25, 2011
Panewa!	Jupiter Corporation	December 16, 2009	Unreleased	Unreleased	Unreleased
Paper Airplane Chase^{NA} Paper Plane^{EU, AUS}	Nintendo	December 24, 2008	April 27, 2009	April 3, 2009	April 2, 2009
Paul's Monster Adventure; Al to Harapeko Monster^{JP}	Agetec	March 24, 2010	December 20, 2010	Unreleased	Unreleased
Paul's Shooting Adventure; Adventure Kids: Pole no Bouken^{JP}	Agetec	July 14, 2010	November 1, 2010	Unreleased	Unreleased
Paul's Shooting Adventure 2 Adventure Kids 2: Paul no Daibouken^{JP}	Agetec	April 11, 2012	May 10, 2012	Unreleased	Unreleased
peakvox: MajiMajo	Fun Unit Inc	September 5, 2012	Unreleased	Unreleased	Unreleased
peakvox: Mew Mew Chamber	Fun Unit Inc	March 9, 2011	Unreleased	Unreleased	Unreleased
Peg Solitaire	Circle Entertainment	Unreleased	November 1, 2010	February 25, 2011	Unreleased
Penguin Patrol	Grab Games	Unreleased	April 5, 2012	Unreleased	Unreleased
Petz Kittens; Petz Nursery^{EU, AUS}	Ubisoft	Unreleased	July 19, 2010	September 17, 2010	September 17, 2010
Petz Catz Family; Petz Cat Superstar^{EU, AUS}	Ubisoft	Unreleased	October 1, 2010	October 1, 2010	October 1, 2010
Petz Dogz Family; Petz Dog Superstar^{EU, AUS}	Ubisoft	Unreleased	October 1, 2010	October 1, 2010	October 1, 2010
Petz Hamsterz Family; Petz Hamster Superstar^{EU, AUS}	Ubisoft	Unreleased	October 1, 2010	October 1, 2010	October 1, 2010
Phantasy Star Zero Mini	Sega	March 25, 2009	Unreleased	Unreleased	Unreleased
Photo Dojo^{EU, AUS, NA} Photo Fighter X^{JP}	Nintendo	December 16, 2009	May 10, 2010	March 19, 2010	March 19, 2010
PicDun	Intense	April 27, 2011	Unreleased	Unreleased	Unreleased
PictureBook Games: The Royal Bluff	Nintendo	September 16, 2009	October 26, 2009	December 11, 2009	December 11, 2009
Pinball Pulse: The Ancients Beckon	Nintendo	Unreleased	October 12, 2009	Unreleased	March 5, 2010
Pirates Assault	Circle Entertainment	Unreleased	Unreleased	Unreleased	April 5, 2012
Plants vs. Zombies	PopCap Games	Unreleased	March 14, 2011	May 6, 2011	May 6, 2011
Play & Learn Chinese	Selectsoft	Unreleased	November 17, 2011	Unreleased	Unreleased
Play & Learn Spanish	Selectsoft	Unreleased	August 4, 2011	Unreleased	Unreleased
Pocket Pack: Strategy Games	Mere Mortals	Unreleased	Unreleased	June 18, 2010	Unreleased
Pocket Pack: Words & Numbers	Mere Mortals	Unreleased	Unreleased	April 16, 2010	Unreleased
Ponjan	Takara Tomy	November 25, 2009	Unreleased	Unreleased	Unreleased
Poony to 20 no Asobi Ba	Beyond Interactive	September 15, 2010	Unreleased	Unreleased	Unreleased
Pop Island	Odenis Studio	Unreleased	December 7, 2009	March 12, 2010	Unreleased
Pop Island Paperfield	Odenis Studio	Unreleased	July 12, 2010	July 23, 2010	Unreleased
Pop Plus: Solo^{NA} Pop+ Solo^{AUS}	Nnooo	Unreleased	August 24, 2009	August 21, 2009	August 21, 2009
Prehistorik Man	Interplay	Unreleased	Unreleased	Unreleased	July 2, 2010
Primrose	Sabarasa	Unreleased	July 12, 2010	August 20, 2010	Unreleased
Pro Jumper! Guilty Gear Tangent!? ARC Style: Furo Jump!! Guilty Gear Gaiden!?^{JP}	Aksys Games	September 1, 2010	June 23, 2011	Unreleased	Unreleased
Pro-Putt Domo	Nintendo	Unreleased	October 19, 2009	Unreleased	Unreleased
Publisher Dream	Circle Entertainment	June 26, 2013	May 9, 2013	May 2, 2013	May 2, 2013
Pucca Noodle Rush	Bigben Interactive	Unreleased	Unreleased	December 18, 2011	Unreleased
Puffins: Let's Fish!	Other Ocean Entertainment	Unreleased	June 21, 2010	Unreleased	Unreleased
Puffins: Let's Race!	Other Ocean Entertainment	Unreleased	July 26, 2010	Unreleased	Unreleased
Puffins: Let's Roll!	Other Ocean Entertainment	Unreleased	April 26, 2010	Unreleased	Unreleased
Puzzle Fever	Korner Entertainment SL	Unreleased	July 27, 2011	Unreleased	Unreleased
Puzzle League Express^{NA, JP} A Little Bit of... Puzzle League^{EU, AUS}	Nintendo	January 28, 2009	August 31, 2009	July 17, 2009	July 17, 2009
Puzzle Quest: Challenge of the Warlords	1st Playable	Unreleased	Unreleased	Unreleased	March 6, 2014
Puzzle Rocks	Cinemax	Unreleased	Unreleased	September 8, 2011	Unreleased
Puzzle to Go: Planets and Universe	Tivola Publishing	Unreleased	Unreleased	November 18, 2012	Unreleased
Puzzle to Go: Wildlife	Tivola Publishing	Unreleased	Unreleased	February 19, 2010	Unreleased
Puzzler World XL	UFO Interactive Games	Unreleased	October 18, 2012	Unreleased	Unreleased
Quick Fill Q Anaume Puzzle Game Q^{JP}	Agetec	June 7, 2011	January 5, 2012	Unreleased	Unreleased
QuickPick Farmer	Dancing Dots	Unreleased	July 5, 2010	Unreleased	Unreleased
Quiz Ongaku no Jikan: Joysound Wii Super DX Senyou Kyoku Navi Dzuke	Hudson Soft	December 8, 2010	Unreleased	Unreleased	Unreleased
Rabi Laby	Agetec	September 1, 2010	March 14, 2011	December 27, 2012	Unreleased
Rabi Laby 2	Agetec	February 23, 2011	July 19, 2012	July 18, 2013	Unreleased
Radar War Series: Gunjin Shogi	WaiS	December 1, 2010	Unreleased	Unreleased	Unreleased
Rayman	Ubisoft	Unreleased	December 7, 2009	December 25, 2009	December 25, 2009
Real Crimes: Jack the Ripper	Virtual Playground	Unreleased	May 24, 2010	June 25, 2010	June 25, 2010
Real Football 2009 DsiWare^{EU, AUS} Real Soccer 2009 DsiWare^{NA}	Gameloft	Unreleased	May 11, 2009	April 24, 2009	April 24, 2009
Real Football 2010^{EU, AUS} Real Soccer 2010^{NA, JP}	Gameloft	May 26, 2010	February 15, 2010	March 5, 2010	March 5, 2010
Remote Racers	QubicGames	Unreleased	Unreleased	Unreleased	May 13, 2011
Retro Pocket	UFO Interactive Games	Unreleased	September 20, 2012	Unreleased	Unreleased
Rikishi	ArtePiazza	January 19, 2011	Unreleased	Unreleased	Unreleased
Road Racing: Uma no Suke 2012	Starfish SD	September 26, 2012	Unreleased	Unreleased	Unreleased
Robot Rescue	Teyon	September 22, 2010	November 16, 2009	November 12, 2010	November 12, 2010
Robot Rescue 2	Teyon	Unreleased	October 11, 2012	October 11, 2012	Unreleased
Rock-n-Roll Domo	Nintendo	Unreleased	October 19, 2009	Unreleased	Unreleased
Rocks N' Rockets	TikGames	Unreleased	Unreleased	Unreleased	December 3, 2010
RPG Dasshutsu Game	Intense	November 24, 2010	Unreleased	Unreleased	Unreleased
Rummikub	Engine Software	Unreleased	October 4, 2010	August 23, 2012	Unreleased
Sagittarius-A-Star	LukPlus	April 16, 2014	Unreleased	Unreleased	Unreleased
Saikyou Gensei Shogi	SilverStar	August 19, 2009	Unreleased	Unreleased	Unreleased
Saikyou Ginsei Igo	SilverStar	September 16, 2009	Unreleased	Unreleased	Unreleased
Sangoku Daifugou	SilverStar	July 14, 2010	Unreleased	Unreleased	Unreleased
Save the Turtles	Sabarasa	Unreleased	March 29, 2010	April 3, 2010	April 30, 2010
Scrabble Classic	Electronic Arts	Unreleased	February 15, 2010	Unreleased	Unreleased
Scrabble Slam	Electronic Arts	Unreleased	April 26, 2010	Unreleased	Unreleased
Scrabble Tools	Electronic Arts	Unreleased	July 19, 2010	Unreleased	Unreleased
Sea Battle; Kaisen Game: Radar War^{JP}	Teyon	June 23, 2010	April 24, 2014	Unreleased	Unreleased
Sengoku Tactics	AMZY	January 25, 2012	Unreleased	Unreleased	Unreleased
Sepas Channel	G-mode	September 29, 2010	Unreleased	Unreleased	Unreleased
Shantae: Risky's Revenge	WayForward Technologies	Unreleased	October 4, 2010	October 11, 2011	October 11, 2011
Shapo	TikGames	Unreleased	Unreleased	Unreleased	March 11, 2011
Shin Sangoku Mahjong: Kokushi Musou	SilverStar	September 15, 2010	Unreleased	Unreleased	Unreleased
Shirogane no Torikago: The Angels with Strange Wings	Starfish SD	December 12, 2012	Unreleased	Unreleased	Unreleased
Simply Mahjong	Engine Software B.V.	Unreleased	Unreleased	September 6, 2010	Unreleased
Simply Minesweeper	Engine Software B.V.	Unreleased	Unreleased	October 6, 2011	Unreleased
Simply Solitaire	Engine Software B.V.	Unreleased	Unreleased	March 28, 2011	Unreleased
Simply Sudoku	Engine Software B.V.	Unreleased	Unreleased	March 12, 2010	Unreleased
Slingo Supreme	Magellan Interactive	Unreleased	December 29, 2011	Unreleased	Unreleased
Smart Girl's Playhouse Mini	UFO Interactive	Unreleased	November 8, 2012	Unreleased	Unreleased
Snakenoid	Cinemax	Unreleased	Unreleased	February 5, 2010	Unreleased
Snakenoid Deluxe	Cinemax	Unreleased	Unreleased	May 24, 2011	Unreleased
Snapdots^{NA} Guruguru Logic^{JP}	Nintendo	December 2, 2009	October 18, 2010	Unreleased	Unreleased
Snowboard Xtreme	EnjoyUp Games	Unreleased	January 3, 2013	January 24, 2013	Unreleased
Sokomania	Cinemax	Unreleased	May 3, 2010	Unreleased	Unreleased
Sokomania 2: Cool Job	Cinemax	Unreleased	May 8, 2014	Unreleased	Unreleased
Solitaire Collection	Intense	February 6, 2013	Unreleased	Unreleased	Unreleased
Soul of Darkness	Gameloft	Unreleased	July 5, 2010	July 16, 2010	July 16, 2010
Space Ace	Digital Leisure	Unreleased	Unreleased	Unreleased	December 31, 2010
Space Invaders Extreme Z	Taito	November 4, 2009	Unreleased	Unreleased	Unreleased
Spaceball: Revolution	Virtual Toys	Unreleased	February 15, 2010	Unreleased	April 2, 2010
Spin Six; Kuru Kuru Action Kuru Pachi 6^{JP}	Nintendo	April 1, 2009	June 21, 2010	December 31, 2010	Unreleased
Spirit Hunters Inc: Light	Nnooo	Unreleased	Unreleased	Unreleased	November 22, 2012
Spirit Hunters Inc: Shadow	Nnooo	Unreleased	Unreleased	Unreleased	November 22, 2012
Spot It! Challenge	Big John Games	Unreleased	November 29, 2010	Unreleased	Unreleased
Spot It! Mean Machines	Big John Games	Unreleased	November 1, 2012	Unreleased	Unreleased
Spot the Difference; Atama IQ Panic^{JP}	Enjoy Gaming	September 28, 2011	October 25, 2010	October 22, 2010	Unreleased
Spotto!^{NA} Bird & Bombs^{EU, AUS} Neratte Spotto!^{JP}	Nintendo	November 25, 2009	February 15, 2010	February 26, 2010	February 26, 2010
Star Novels: Kono Haretasora no Shita de	Starfish	June 5, 2013	Unreleased	Unreleased	Unreleased
Star Novels: Shirogane no Torikago	Starfish	December 12, 2012	Unreleased	Unreleased	Unreleased
Starship Defense	Nintendo	February 10, 2010	January 18, 2010	December 18, 2009	December 18, 2009
SteamWorld Tower Defense	Image & Form	Unreleased	July 5, 2010	July 5, 2010	July 5, 2010
Subete ga Tsunagaru Kimochiyosa! Kotobashi-ru	Bandai Namco Games	November 10, 2010	Unreleased	Unreleased	Unreleased
Sudoku	Electronic Arts	Unreleased	October 26, 2009	2010	November 6, 2009
Sudoku 4Pockets 3600 Puzzles	4pockets.com	Unreleased	January 2010	January 2010	Unreleased
Sudoku Challenge	Digital Leisure	Unreleased	November 30, 2009	May 14, 2010	Unreleased
Sudoku Sensei	Hudson Soft	Unreleased	December 28, 2009	January 15, 2010	Unreleased
Sudoku Student^{NA} Sudoku 50! For Beginners^{EU, AUS, JP}	Hudson Soft	March 18, 2009	July 27, 2009	June 26, 2009	June 26, 2009
Super Swap	Teyon	Unreleased	June 21, 2010	January 7, 2011	Unreleased
Super Yum Yum Puzzle Adventures	Mastertronic	Unreleased	March 26, 2010	March 26, 2010	March 26, 2010
Supermarket Mania	G5 Entertainment	Unreleased	Unreleased	Unreleased	November 19, 2010
Surfacer+	Lexis Numerique	Unreleased	January 10, 2011	January 14, 2011	Unreleased
Surviving High School	Electronic Arts	Unreleased	April 26, 2010	April 3, 2010	April 30, 2010
System Flaw Recruit	Enjoy Gaming Ltd.	Unreleased	April 26, 2010	April 16, 2010	Unreleased
Telegraph Crosswords	Sanuk Games	Unreleased	June 14, 2010	Unreleased	Unreleased
Telegraph Sudoku & Kakuro	Sanuk Games	Unreleased	May 31, 2010	June 18, 2010	Unreleased
Tell Me Darling	Starfish SD	2011	Unreleased	Unreleased	Unreleased
Tetris Party Live	Hudson Soft	Unreleased	November 22, 2010	December 3, 2010	Unreleased
The Aquarium of Luck	MSL	Unreleased	Unreleased	November 10, 2011	Unreleased
The Cellar	Arc System Works	June 27, 2012	Unreleased	Unreleased	Unreleased
The Legend of Zelda: Four Swords Anniversary Edition	Nintendo	September 28, 2011	September 28, 2011	September 28, 2011	September 28, 2011
The Lost Town - The Dust	Circle Entertainment	Unreleased	Unreleased	Unreleased	August 4, 2011
The Lost Town - The Jungle	Circle Entertainment	Unreleased	Unreleased	Unreleased	August 16, 2012
The Misshitsukara no Dasshutsu: Gakkou-Hen	D3Publisher	December 24, 2009	Unreleased	Unreleased	Unreleased
The Misshitsukara no Dasshutsu iWare	D3Publisher	July 22, 2009	Unreleased	Unreleased	Unreleased
The Misshitsukara no Dasshutsu: Sky Tower Hen	D3Publisher	December 22, 2010	Unreleased	Unreleased	Unreleased
The Mysterious Case of Dr. Jekyll and Mr. Hyde	Joindots	Unreleased	December 3, 2015	October 15, 2015	Unreleased
The Oregon Trail	Gameloft	Unreleased	December 28, 2009	Unreleased	Unreleased
The Seller	Circle Entertainment	Unreleased	January 17, 2011	March 4, 2011	Unreleased
The Tower DS Classic	Nintendo	August 26, 2009	Unreleased	Unreleased	Unreleased
The Tower DS: Kougai Ekimae Ichiba ni Idome!! Kyodai Shopping Center Hen	Nintendo	October 21, 2009	Unreleased	Unreleased	Unreleased
The Tower DS: Ura Roji no Nitouchi ni Ichiryuu Hotel o Kensetsuseyo!! Hen	Nintendo	September 30, 2009	Unreleased	Unreleased	Unreleased
Thorium Wars	Big John Games	Unreleased	October 5, 2009	October 8, 2010	Unreleased
Topoloco	Abstraction Games	Unreleased	July 5, 2012	July 12, 2012	Unreleased
Torida: Chicken Tabi Shindan	G-mode	September 30, 2009	Unreleased	Unreleased	Unreleased
Touch de Manzai! Megami no Etsubo DL	Collavier	May 1, 2013	Unreleased	Unreleased	Unreleased
Touch de Oboeru Hyakunin-Isshu: Chotto DSi Shigureden	Nintendo	November 4, 2010	Unreleased	Unreleased	Unreleased
Touch Solitaire; 2-in-1 Solitaire^{EU} Solitaire DSi^{JP}	Nintendo	January 28, 2009	January 11, 2010	September 11, 2009	September 11, 2009
Trajectile^{NA} Reflect Missile^{JP, AUS, EU}	Nintendo	January 4, 2010	January 4, 2010	November 27, 2009	November 27, 2009
Treasure Hunter X Fall in the Dark^{JP}	Agetec	April 21, 2010	December 14, 2011	August 29, 2013	August 29, 2013
Trollboarder	Enjoy Gaming	Unreleased	July 21, 2011	April 8, 2012	Unreleased
True Swing Golf Express; A Little Bit of... Nintendo Touch Golf^{EU}	Nintendo	Unreleased	February 1, 2010	November 13, 2009	November 13, 2009
TURN: The Lost Artifact	Creative Patterns	Unreleased	August 9, 2010	Unreleased	Unreleased
Ubongo	Korner Entertainment SL	Unreleased	April 25, 2011	Unreleased	Unreleased
Uchimakure! Touch de Chameleon	Tom Create	June 30, 2010	Unreleased	Unreleased	Unreleased
Uchuu o Kakeru Shoujo Shooting	ITL	November 25, 2009	Unreleased	Unreleased	Unreleased
Ugoite Asobu Boxing	Genki	July 28, 2010	Unreleased	Unreleased	Unreleased
Uno	Gameloft	December 9, 2009	December 21, 2009	November 20, 2009	November 20, 2009
Unou to Sanou ga Kousa Suru: UraNoura	Tom Create	July 29, 2009	Unreleased	Unreleased	Unreleased
Valet Parking 1989	Zordix	Unreleased	May 30, 2011	April 21, 2011	April 22, 2011
Viking Invasion	BiP media	Unreleased	November 2, 2009	October 16, 2009	October 16, 2009
VT Tennis	Virtual Toys	Unreleased	March 1, 2010	April 3, 2010	April 30, 2010
Wakugumi: Monochrome Puzzle	Mitchell^{JP} Nintendo^{PAL}	April 1, 2009	Unreleased	Unreleased	October 16, 2009
WarioWare: Snapped!^{EU, AUS, NA}	Nintendo	December 24, 2008	April 5, 2009	April 3, 2009	April 3, 2009
WarioWare: Touched! DL	Nintendo	March 17, 2016	March 31, 2016	March 31, 2016	March 31, 2016
Whack-A-Friend	Agetec	Unreleased	May 9, 2011	Unreleased	Unreleased
White-Water Domo	Nintendo	Unreleased	October 19, 2009	Unreleased	Unreleased
Wizard Defenders	Teyon	Unreleased	December 27, 2012	Unreleased	Unreleased
Wonderful Sports Bowling	Genki	October 27, 2010	Unreleased	Unreleased	Unreleased
Word Searcher	Digital Leisure	Unreleased	January 11, 2010	Unreleased	Unreleased
Word Searcher 2	Digital Leisure	Unreleased	January 3, 2011	Unreleased	Unreleased
Word Searcher 3	Digital Leisure	Unreleased	May 16, 2011	Unreleased	Unreleased
Word Searcher 4	Digital Leisure	Unreleased	December 8, 2011	Unreleased	Unreleased
WordJong Arcade	Magellan Interactive	Unreleased	December 15, 2011	Unreleased	Unreleased
Working Dawgs: A-Maze-ing Pipes	Big John Games	Unreleased	November 15, 2012	Unreleased	Unreleased
Working Dawgs: Rivet Retriever	Big John Games	Unreleased	April 18, 2013	Unreleased	Unreleased
World Poker Tour: Texas Hold 'Em	Hands-On Mobile	Unreleased	May 24, 2010	Unreleased	Unreleased
X-Scape^{NA} 3D Space Tank^{EU, AUS} X-Returns^{JP}	Nintendo	June 30, 2010	May 28, 2010	July 16, 2010	July 16, 2010
Yummy Yummy Cooking Jam	Virtual Toys	Unreleased	Unreleased	Unreleased	September 25, 2009
Zacross	Mechanic Arms	March 19, 2014	Unreleased	Unreleased	Unreleased
Zenonia	Gamevil	December 24, 2010	December 27, 2010	December 24, 2010	December 24, 2010
Zimo: Mahjong Fanatic; Mahjong Puzzle: Zimo^{JP}	Agetec	October 12, 2011	June 16, 2011	Unreleased	Unreleased
Zombie Skape	EnjoyUp Games	Unreleased	December 13, 2012	January 17, 2013	Unreleased
Zoo Frenzy	Gameloft	April 14, 2010	February 15, 2010	Unreleased	February 26, 2010
Zoonies: Escape from Makatu	Kiloo	Unreleased	August 18, 2011	April 29, 2011	April 29, 2011

== Applications ==
There are 181 applications released on DSiWare.

Title	Publisher	Japan	North America	Europe	Australia
6 in 1 Dictionary with Camera Function^{NA} Dictionary 6 in 1 with Camera Function	Nintendo	October 7, 2009	Unreleased	September 4, 2009	September 4, 2009
ACT Series: Tango Chou Nicchuu-hen	Digital Media Lab	November 11, 2009	Unreleased	Unreleased	Unreleased
ACT Series: Tango Chou Nichiei-hen	Digital Media Lab	January 27, 2010	Unreleased	Unreleased	Unreleased
ACT Series: Tango Chou Nikkan-hen	Digital Media Lab	January 27, 2010	Unreleased	Unreleased	Unreleased
Anata no Kyuu o Check Kanken Mini Test	IE Institute	December 22, 2010	Unreleased	Unreleased	Unreleased
Animal Crossing Calculator	Nintendo	February 25, 2009	May 4, 2009	June 5, 2009	June 5, 2009
Animal Crossing Clock	Nintendo	April 1, 2009	May 4, 2009	June 5, 2009	June 5, 2009
Anne's Doll Studio: Antique Collection; Atelier Deco la Doll Antique^{JP}	Gamebridge	December 26, 2012	June 26, 2014	June 26, 2014	Unreleased
Anne's Doll Studio: Gothic Collection; Atelier Deco la Doll Gothic^{JP}	Gamebridge	April 28, 2010	January 19, 2012	January 19, 2012	Unreleased
Anne's Doll Studio: Lolita Collection; Atelier Deco la Doll Lolita^{JP}	Gamebridge	December 22, 2010	June 26, 2014	June 26, 2014	Unreleased
Anne's Doll Studio: Princess Collection; Atelier Deco la Doll Princess^{JP}	Gamebridge	April 27, 2011	June 26, 2014	June 26, 2014	Unreleased
Anne's Doll Studio: Tokyo Collection; Atelier Deco la Doll^{JP}	Gamebridge	December 16, 2009	April 12, 2012	April 12, 2012	Unreleased
Aquarium with Clock	LukPlus	February 24, 2010	Unreleased	Unreleased	Unreleased
Art Academy: First Semester	Nintendo	November 18, 2009	September 14, 2009	December 25, 2009	December 25, 2009
Art Academy: Second Semester	Nintendo	November 18, 2009	September 28, 2009	January 8, 2010	January 8, 2010
Artist ni Narou! Kigaru ni Sketch	Ertain	April 28, 2010	Unreleased	Unreleased	Unreleased
Artist ni Narou! Minna no Nurie Inu-Hen	Ertain	December 16, 2009	Unreleased	Unreleased	Unreleased
Artist ni Narou! Minna no Nurie Joukyuu-Hen	Ertain	January 13, 2010	Unreleased	Unreleased	Unreleased
Artist ni Narou! Minna no Nurie Musha-Hen	Ertain	February 3, 2010	Unreleased	Unreleased	Unreleased
Artist ni Narou! Minna no Nurie Neko-Hen	Ertain	January 6, 2010	Unreleased	Unreleased	Unreleased
Artist ni Narou! Minna no Nurie Shokyuuhen	Ertain	December 9, 2009	Unreleased	Unreleased	Unreleased
Atsumeru Egaocho	Nintendo	April 22, 2009	Unreleased	Unreleased	Unreleased
Biorhythm	Cinemax	Unreleased	December 17, 2010	January 10, 2013	Unreleased
Calculator	Cinemax	Unreleased	Unreleased	Unreleased	May 20, 2011
Chara Pasha! Cinnamon Roll	Nippon Columbia	January 12, 2011	Unreleased	Unreleased	Unreleased
Chara Pasha! Hello Kitty	Nippon Columbia	December 8, 2010	Unreleased	Unreleased	Unreleased
Chara Pasha! Kaiten Muten Maru	Nippon Columbia	September 14, 2011	Unreleased	Unreleased	Unreleased
Chara Pasha! Kikansha Thomas	Nippon Columbia	December 15, 2010	Unreleased	Unreleased	Unreleased
Chara Pasha! My Melody	Nippon Columbia	March 2, 2011	Unreleased	Unreleased	Unreleased
Chara Pasha! SpongeBob	Nippon Columbia	January 19, 2011	Unreleased	Unreleased	Unreleased
Chiri Quiz Shougakusei	IE Institute	August 10, 2011	Unreleased	Unreleased	Unreleased
Chotto DS Bungaku Zenshuu: Sekai no Bungaku 20	Nintendo	February 25, 2009	Unreleased	Unreleased	Unreleased
Chuugaku Eijukugo Kihon 150-Go Master	IE Institute	September 30, 2009	Unreleased	Unreleased	Unreleased
Chuugaku Eitango Kihon 400-Go Master	IE Institute	August 26, 2009	Unreleased	Unreleased	Unreleased
City Transport Map - Volume 1	Nintendo	January 28, 2009	August 7, 2009	August 7, 2009	August 7, 2009
City Transport Map - Volume 2	Nintendo	January 28, 2009	August 7, 2009	August 7, 2009	August 7, 2009
Dekisugi Tincle Pack	Nintendo	June 24, 2009	Unreleased	Unreleased	Unreleased
Did It Myself ABC123	Powerhead Games	Unreleased	August 9, 2009	Unreleased	Unreleased
Discolight	Kaasa Solution	Unreleased	November 8, 2010	May 21, 2010	Unreleased
Dokodemo Wii no Ma	Nintendo	May 1, 2009	Unreleased	Unreleased	Unreleased
Dragon Quest Monsters: Battle Road Victory: Senyou Color Code Scanner	Square Enix	July 15, 2010	Unreleased	Unreleased	Unreleased
DS Kokoro Merie	Nintendo	April 7, 2010	Unreleased	Unreleased	Unreleased
Faceez; Atamago^{JP}	Gamebridge	August 24, 2011	February 22, 2010	April 9, 2010	April 9, 2010
Faceez: Monsters! Atamago Monsters^{JP}	Gamebridge	October 19, 2011	March 28, 2011	February 18, 2011	Unreleased
Flashlight	Kaasa Solution	Unreleased	October 25, 2010	March 19, 2010	March 19, 2010
Flipnote Studio	Nintendo	December 24, 2008	August 12, 2009	August 14, 2009	August 14, 2009
Flips: More Bloody Horowitz	Electronic Arts	Unreleased	May 17, 2010	May 21, 2010	May 21, 2010
Flips: Silent but Deadly	Electronic Arts	Unreleased	Unreleased	May 7, 2010	May 7, 2010
Flips: The Bubonic Builders	Electronic Arts	Unreleased	March 8, 2010	Unreleased	March 5, 2010
Flips: The Enchanted Wood	Electronic Arts	Unreleased	Unreleased	Unreleased	March 19, 2010
Flips: The Folk of the Faraway Tree	Electronic Arts	Unreleased	Unreleased	June 4, 2010	June 4, 2010
Flips: Terror in Cubicle Four	Electronic Arts	Unreleased	March 1, 2010	Unreleased	February 19, 2010
Flips: The Magic Faraway Tree	Electronic Arts	Unreleased	Unreleased	May 28, 2010	May 28, 2010
Ganbaru Watashi no Osaifu Ouendan	Nintendo	April 1, 2009	Unreleased	Unreleased	Unreleased
Genius Personal: Ei-Wa Rakubiki Jiten	Nintendo	January 13, 2010	Unreleased	Unreleased	Unreleased
Genius Personal: Wa-Ei Rakubiki Jiten	Nintendo	January 13, 2010	Unreleased	Unreleased	Unreleased
Goku Birei Aquarium: Sekai no Sakana to Iruka: Kujira-Tachi	Collavier	June 12, 2013	Unreleased	Unreleased	Unreleased
Hajimete no Mojirenshuu	Kounan Denki Seisakujo	July 7, 2010	Unreleased	Unreleased	Unreleased
Hello Kitty no Minna no Nurie	Collavier	July 20, 2011	Unreleased	Unreleased	Unreleased
Hellokids Vol. 1: Coloring and Painting	BiP Media	Unreleased	May 16, 2011	April 15, 2011	Unreleased
Hip Hop King Rytmik Edition	Cinemax	Unreleased	Unreleased	Unreleased	February 11, 2011
Hirameki Egara Shiritori	Kounan Denki Seisakujo	June 22, 2011	Unreleased	Unreleased	Unreleased
Hobo Ka no Kenkō Techō	Nintendo	April 21, 2010	Unreleased	Unreleased	Unreleased
Hobonichi Rosenzu 2009	Nintendo	January 28, 2009	Unreleased	Unreleased	Unreleased
Hobonichi Rosenzu 2010: Zenkoku 7 Area + Shinkansen Map	Nintendo	February 3, 2010	Unreleased	Unreleased	Unreleased
I am in the Movie	Circle Entertainment	Unreleased	March 27, 2014	April 17, 2014	Unreleased
Inchworm Animation	Flat Black Films	Unreleased	Unreleased	Unreleased	September 20, 2012
Jam Space: PocketStudio	HB Studios Multimedia	Unreleased	December 13, 2010	Unreleased	Unreleased
Jibun Detsukuru: Nintendo DS Guide	Nintendo	November 17, 2010	Unreleased	Unreleased	Unreleased
Jukugo Quiz	IE Institute	September 14, 2011	Unreleased	Unreleased	Unreleased
Kaite Oboeru: Eigo Tangochō	Nintendo	March 17, 2010	Unreleased	Unreleased	Unreleased
Kaite Oboeru: Shashin Tangochō	Nintendo	March 17, 2010	Unreleased	Unreleased	Unreleased
Kakitori Rekishi Shougakusei	IE Institute	July 13, 2011	Unreleased	Unreleased	Unreleased
Keisan 100 Renda	IE Institute	October 24, 2009	Unreleased	Unreleased	Unreleased
Kigaru ni Oekaki Koubou	Collavier	September 14, 2011	Unreleased	Unreleased	Unreleased
Kokoro no Health Meter: Kokoron	T&S Ltd.	September 8, 2010	Unreleased	Unreleased	Unreleased
Koneko no Ie: Kirishima-ke to Sanbiki no Koneko	WorkJam	March 3, 2010	Unreleased	Unreleased	Unreleased
Koukou Eijukugo Kihon 200-Go Master	IE Institute	October 24, 2009	Unreleased	Unreleased	Unreleased
Koukou Eijukugo Kihon 400-Go Master	IE Institute	October 24, 2009	Unreleased	Unreleased	Unreleased
Koumin Quiz Shougakusei	IE Institute	August 3, 2011	Unreleased	Unreleased	Unreleased
Kyōkara Hajimeru Facening: KaoTre Mini 1 – Sukkiri Chōkao Course	Nintendo	September 9, 2009	Unreleased	Unreleased	Unreleased
Kyōkara Hajimeru Facening: KaoTre Mini 2 – Sutekina Egao Course	Nintendo	September 9, 2009	Unreleased	Unreleased	Unreleased
Kyōkara Hajimeru Facening: KaoTre Mini 3 – Wakawakashī Kao Course	Nintendo	September 9, 2009	Unreleased	Unreleased	Unreleased
Kyōkara Hajimeru Facening: KaoTre Mini 4 – Me to Kuchi no Kenkō Course	Nintendo	September 9, 2009	Unreleased	Unreleased	Unreleased
Kyōkara Hajimeru Facening: KaoTre Mini 5 – Kao no Refresher Course	Nintendo	September 9, 2009	Unreleased	Unreleased	Unreleased
Kyou wa Nan no Hi? Hyakka: Hyakkajiten Mypedia Yori	IE Institute	February 24, 2010	Unreleased	Unreleased	Unreleased
Let's Create! Pottery	Infinite Dreams	Unreleased	August 25, 2011	June 28, 2012	Unreleased
Little Twin Stars to Minna no Nurie	Collavier	December 21, 2011	Unreleased	Unreleased	Unreleased
Mahoujin to Image Keisan	IE Institute	July 1, 2009	Unreleased	Unreleased	Unreleased
Mainichi Sodateru Nikki Calendar	IE Institute	November 4, 2009	Unreleased	Unreleased	Unreleased
Make Up & Style	Cypronia	Unreleased	July 7, 2011	January 12, 2012	Unreleased
Mario Calculator	Nintendo	February 25, 2009	June 15, 2009	July 3, 2009	July 3, 2009
Mario Clock	Nintendo	April 1, 2009	June 15, 2009	July 3, 2009	July 3, 2009
Master of Illusion Express: Deep Psyche^{NA, AUS} A Little Bit of... Magic Made Fun: Deep Psyche^{EU}	Nintendo	December 24, 2008	April 20, 2009	May 8, 2009	May 8, 2009
Master of Illusion Express: Funny Face^{NA, AUS} A Little Bit of... Magic Made Fun: Funny Face^{EU}	Nintendo	December 24, 2008	April 5, 2009	May 1, 2009	May 1, 2009
Master of Illusion Express: Matchmaker^{NA, AUS} A Little Bit of... Magic Made Fun: Matchmaker^{EU}	Nintendo	April 22, 2009	December 14, 2009	December 4, 2009	December 4, 2009
Master of Illusion Express: Mind Probe^{NA, AUS} A Little Bit of... Magic Made Fun: Mind Probe^{EU}	Nintendo	April 1, 2009	November 30, 2009	December 25, 2009	December 25, 2009
Master of Illusion Express: Psychic Camera^{NA, AUS} A Little Bit of... Magic Made Fun: Psychic Camera^{EU}	Nintendo	May 27, 2009	December 28, 2009	December 18, 2009	December 18, 2009
Master of Illusion Express: Shuffle Games^{NA, AUS} A Little Bit of... Magic Made Fun: Shuffle Games^{EU}	Nintendo	December 24, 2008	April 13, 2009	May 15, 2009	May 15, 2009
Meikyō Kokugo Rakubiki Jiten	Nintendo	November 25, 2009	Unreleased	Unreleased	Unreleased
Missy Mila: Twisted Tales	Planet Nemo Productions	Unreleased	Unreleased	January 21, 2011	Unreleased
Moji to Koe de Tanoshiku Kaiwa: Speech Support DS	Wacom IT	March 30, 2011	Unreleased	Unreleased	Unreleased
Motto Me de Unou o Kitaeru Sokudoku Jutsu Light	MileStone Inc.	September 14, 2011	Unreleased	Unreleased	Unreleased
Music on: Acoustic Guitar	Abylight	Unreleased	Unreleased	Unreleased	September 10, 2010
Music on: Drums	Abylight	Unreleased	Unreleased	Unreleased	December 24, 2010
Music on: Electric Guitar	Abylight	Unreleased	Unreleased	Unreleased	November 26, 2010
Music on: Electronic Keyboard	Abylight	Unreleased	June 14, 2010	June 4, 2010	Unreleased
Music on: Retro Keyboard	Abylight	Unreleased	July 12, 2010	June 25, 2010	July 12, 2010
My Melody to Minna no Nurie	Collavier	December 28, 2011	Unreleased	Unreleased	Unreleased
myDiary	Nnooo	Unreleased	Unreleased	Unreleased	September 17, 2010
myNotebook: Blue	Nnooo	Unreleased	Unreleased	Unreleased	November 20, 2009
myNotebook: Carbon	Nnooo	Unreleased	Unreleased	Unreleased	August 27, 2010
myNotebook: Green	Nnooo	Unreleased	Unreleased	Unreleased	December 18, 2009
myNotebook: Pearl	Nnooo	Unreleased	Unreleased	Unreleased	August 27, 2010
myNotebook: Red	Nnooo	Unreleased	Unreleased	Unreleased	December 4, 2009
myNotebook: Tan	Nnooo	Unreleased	Unreleased	Unreleased	October 9, 2010
myPostcards	Nnooo	Unreleased	2010	April 23, 2010	April 23, 2010
MySims Camera	Electronic Arts	Unreleased	September 21, 2009	September 17, 2009	September 18, 2009
Nagameru Dake de Kashikoku nareru! Mojipittan Shiritori Tokei	Bandai Namco Games	February 25, 2009	Unreleased	Unreleased	Unreleased
Nari-Chara: Katekyoo Hitman Reborn!	Bandai Namco Games	January 27, 2010	Unreleased	Unreleased	Unreleased
Nari-Chara: Naruto Shippuden	Bandai Namco Games	January 20, 2010	Unreleased	Unreleased	Unreleased
"New Ace Touch! English - Korean Dictionary"	Nintendo	2011	Unreleased	Unreleased	Unreleased
"New Ace Touch! Korean - English Dictionary"	Nintendo	2011	Unreleased	Unreleased	Unreleased
Nintendo 3DS Transfer Tool	Nintendo	July 6, 2011	July 6, 2011	July 7, 2011	June 7, 2011
Nintendo Countdown Calendar	Nintendo	Unreleased	September 20, 2010	Unreleased	November 19, 2010
Nintendo DSi Browser	Nintendo	November 1, 2008	April 5, 2009	April 3, 2009	April 1, 2009
Nintendo DSi Camera	Nintendo	November 1, 2008	April 5, 2009	April 3, 2009	April 2, 2009
Nintendo DSi Instrument Tuner	Nintendo	September 2, 2009	March 29, 2010	Unreleased	Unreleased
Nintendo DSi Metronome	Nintendo	September 2, 2009	March 29, 2010	Unreleased	Unreleased
Nintendo DSi Sound	Nintendo	November 1, 2008	April 5, 2009	April 3, 2009	April 2, 2009
Otegaru Shashin Memo	Kounan Denki Seisakujo	November 4, 2010	Unreleased	Unreleased	Unreleased
Otoa no Tame no Keisan Training DS	IE Institute	August 5, 2009	Unreleased	Unreleased	Unreleased
Otona no Tame no Renjuku Kanji	IE Institute	May 19, 2010	Unreleased	Unreleased	Unreleased
Petit Computer; Puchicon mkII^{JP}	Gamebridge	March 14, 2012	July 19, 2012	July 25, 2013	Unreleased
Photo Clock	Nintendo	January 28, 2009	May 25, 2009	October 9, 2009	October 9, 2009
Photo Stand Tsuki: Ban-Bro DX Radio	Nintendo	April 1, 2009	Unreleased	Unreleased	Unreleased
Picture Perfect Pocket Stylist; Hair Salon: Pocket Stylist^{EU}	Gamebridge	Unreleased	July 9, 2010	May 2, 2011	Unreleased
Pocket Rububu: Hokkaido	Nintendo	July 29, 2009	Unreleased	Unreleased	Unreleased
Pocket Rurubu: Izu Hakone	Nintendo	February 24, 2010	Unreleased	Unreleased	Unreleased
Pocket Rurubu: Kobe	Nintendo	December 24, 2009	Unreleased	Unreleased	Unreleased
Pocket Rurubu: Kyoto	Nintendo	May 27, 2009	Unreleased	Unreleased	Unreleased
Pocket Rurubu: Nagoya	Nintendo	December 24, 2009	Unreleased	Unreleased	Unreleased
Pocket Rububu: Okinawa	Nintendo	July 29, 2009	Unreleased	Unreleased	Unreleased
Pocket Rurubu: Osaka	Nintendo	October 21, 2009	Unreleased	Unreleased	Unreleased
Pocket Rurubu: Shinshū	Nintendo	February 24, 2010	Unreleased	Unreleased	Unreleased
Pocket Rurubu: Tokyo	Nintendo	May 27, 2009	Unreleased	Unreleased	Unreleased
Pocket Rurubu: Yokohama Kamakura	Nintendo	October 21, 2009	Unreleased	Unreleased	Unreleased
Puchicon	SmileBoom	March 9, 2011	Unreleased	Unreleased	Unreleased
Renjuku Kanji Chuugakusei	IE Institute	April 28, 2010	Unreleased	Unreleased	Unreleased
Renjuku Kanji Shougaku 1 Nensei	IE Institute	December 16, 2009	Unreleased	Unreleased	Unreleased
Renjuku Kanji Shougaku 2 Nensei	IE Institute	January 20, 2010	Unreleased	Unreleased	Unreleased
Renjuku Kanji Shougaku 3 Nensei	IE Institute	February 3, 2010	Unreleased	Unreleased	Unreleased
Renjuku Kanji Shougaku 4 Nensei	IE Institute	March 10, 2010	Unreleased	Unreleased	Unreleased
Renjuku Kanji Shougaku 5 Nensei	IE Institute	March 10, 2010	Unreleased	Unreleased	Unreleased
Renjuku Kanji Shougaku 6 Nensei	IE Institute	April 10, 2010	Unreleased	Unreleased	Unreleased
Rhythm Core Alpha	SoftEgg	Unreleased	August 9, 2010	January 21, 2011	January 21, 2011
Rhythm Core Alpha 2	SoftEgg	Unreleased	June 20, 2013	August 15, 2013	August 15, 2013
Rika Quiz Shougakusei: Seibutsu Chigaku Hen	IE Institute	September 7, 2011	Unreleased	Unreleased	Unreleased
Rytmik	Cinemax	June 23, 2010	Unreleased	May 7, 2010	May 7, 2010
Rytmik Retrobits	Cinemax	Unreleased	Unreleased	Unreleased	November 3, 2011
Rytmik Rock Edition	Cinemax	Unreleased	Unreleased	Unreleased	November 5, 2010
Rytmik World Music	Cinemax	Unreleased	Unreleased	Unreleased	September 4, 2014
Sakurai Miho no Kouun no Megami Therapy Uranai	WaiS	February 16, 2011	Unreleased	Unreleased	Unreleased
Sekai Tanken: Kokki World Map	ISP	December 9, 2009	Unreleased	Unreleased	Unreleased
Sekai Tanken: Kokki World Map 2012	ISP	July 11, 2009	Unreleased	Unreleased	Unreleased
Sekai Tanken: Kokki World Map 3	ISP	August 28, 2013	Unreleased	Unreleased	Unreleased
Shikakui Atama o Maru Kusuru, Mekuri Calendar DS	IE Institute	September 30, 2009	Unreleased	Unreleased	Unreleased
Sleep Clock	Nintendo	October 7, 2009	Unreleased	October 29, 2010	October 29, 2010
Sokuren Keisan: Nanmon-hen	IE Institute	April 13, 2011	Unreleased	Unreleased	Unreleased
Sokuren Keisan: Shougaku 1 Nensei	IE Institute	September 22, 2010	Unreleased	Unreleased	Unreleased
Sokuren Keisan: Shougaku 2 Nensei	IE Institute	September 29, 2010	Unreleased	Unreleased	Unreleased
Sokuren Keisan: Shougaku 3 Nensei	IE Institute	November 4, 2010	Unreleased	Unreleased	Unreleased
Sokuren Keisan: Shougaku 4 Nensei	IE Institute	November 4, 2010	Unreleased	Unreleased	Unreleased
Sokuren Keisan: Shougaku 5 Nensei	IE Institute	December 15, 2010	Unreleased	Unreleased	Unreleased
Sokuren Keisan: Shougaku 6 Nensei	IE Institute	January 12, 2011	Unreleased	Unreleased	Unreleased
Sparkle Snapshots	Nintendo	April 22, 2009	November 2, 2009	January 1, 2010	December 25, 2009
Sukusuku Native Eigo Nikki Calendar	IE Institute	May 26, 2010	Unreleased	Unreleased	Unreleased
Tsukutte Utau: Saru Band	Nintendo	April 28, 2010	Unreleased	Unreleased	Unreleased
Ugoite Asobu Diet	Genki	July 14, 2010	Unreleased	Unreleased	Unreleased
Uso Hakken Utsuwa: Kokoronouchi o Nozoichao	Genki	February 10, 2010	Unreleased	Unreleased	Unreleased
Utsushite Jikkan! Diet Memo	Bandai Namco Games	August 5, 2009	Unreleased	Unreleased	Unreleased

== See also ==
- List of Nintendo DS games
- List of WiiWare games
