= Chee-Chai Alien =

2001 video game

- Developer: Creatures
- Publisher: Creatures
- Director: Hirokazu Tanaka
- Platform: Game Boy Color
- Release: JP: February 27, 2001
- Genre: Action
- Mode: Single-player

Chee-Chai Alien (ちっちゃいエイリアン, Chitchai Eirian; "Tiny Alien") is a video game developed by Creatures, Inc. and released on the Game Boy Color in Japan on February 27, 2001. It was designed and developed by Hirokazu Tanaka.

It utilizes the Game Boy Color's infrared port and has a built-in rumble feature. It is compatible with the Game Boy Printer. Because the game must use the Game Boy Color's IR sensor, the game will display an error screen when inserted in a Game Boy or a Game Boy Advance, being one of the only Game Boy Color games that the GBA does not support.

Players use the infrared sensor on the Game Boy Color to find artificial light sources, to which the Game Pak responds by rumbling. The game comes with a "spectrum communicator", a plastic device that can be attached to the Game Boy Color to enhance the sensitivity of the infrared sensor. However, even with the attachment, the game still struggled to detect light sources.

== Legacy ==
The Game Boy Advance game Nonono Puzzle Chalien, also developed by Creatures, was spun off from Chee-Chai Alien. One of the minigames from Nonono Puzzle Chalien was then spun off as the DSiWare title Spin Six, developed by Zener Works. Spin Six is the only one of the three to be released outside Japan.
