= Zack Parrish =

American video game composer (born 1983)

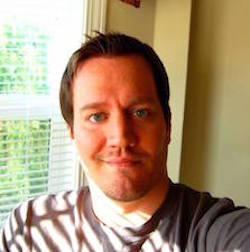

Background information
- Born: Stephen Zachary Parrish; November 8, 1983 (age 42); Woodland, North Carolina, U.S.
- Genres: Video game
- Occupations: Composer, Programmer
- Instruments: Piano, alto saxophone
- Years active: 2003–present
- Website: www.zackparrish.com

Stephen Zachary Parrish (also known as Zack Parrish or CBlockdis) (born 8 November 1983) is an Annual Game Music Award nominated independent game composer, known for writing the soundtracks to the Metroidvania Valdis Story: Abyssal City, and other games such as Sakura Fantasy.

Parrish additionally composes music of all genres as an independent musician. His debut independent record, "Solo Piano Collection", was released for digital distribution on December 7, 2011. Through arrangements and original music, Parrish has also contributed to OverClocked Remix and OverClocked Records.

Early in his career, Parrish joined with Saturnine Games to create music and occasionally sounds for the games created by Saturnine. The first game launched under Saturnine was Cosmos X2 for the Nintendo DSi on August 30, 2010, with Parrish having created the synthetic soundtrack that can be heard throughout the game. While continuing his work at Saturnine, Parrish has joined with several other Independent Developers including Carolina Moya and Kyron Ramsey who make up the team Endless Fluff. Under the direction of Endless Fluff, Parrish created the eerie orchestral soundtrack to Valdis Story: Abyssal City over the span of 2 years. Valdis Story: Abyssal City became an independent hit on Steam, creating the opportunity for Parrish to be nominated under “Outstanding Contribution – Independent Composer” at the Annual Game Music Awards. In the 2013 Annual Game Music Awards, Parrish would go on to win the achievement he was nominated for.

Parrish is known for his versatility in styles as he enjoys mixing up genres. Once receiving concept art, backstories for characters, or other information about the “world” he is creating music for, he comes up with an idea that fits with the game. He doesn’t stick to one genre for this reason, and has received praise for doing so.

Currently, Parrish continues his work under Saturnine Games, and works under several independent companies, but does not stick to one. In addition to composition, Parrish works as a Programmer for Cherokee Health Systems.

== Early life and education ==
Parrish was brought up in Ahoskie, North Carolina, attending local primary schools there. Through high school, Parrish played the alto saxophone in his school concert band as well as marching band while playing the piano on the side. From adolescence, Parrish fell in love with the Final Fantasy series, becoming inspired by the music of Nobuo Uematsu. Parrish would later go to write music for noteworthy games and short films.

== Works ==
Title	Year	System	Notes
Cosmos X2	2010	Nintendo DSi	Guitar performance by Anthony Morgan
Antipole	2011	Nintendo DSi	Guitar performance by Anthony Morgan
Cute Things Dying Violently	2011	Windows, OS X,	
The Saga of Original Sin	Canceled (Album only release, 2012)	Windows	
Windhaven: Spirit of Flight	Canceled (Album only release, 2013	Windows	Performances by Anthony Morgan and Amanda Lee
Valdis Story: Abyssal City	2013	Windows, OS X	Additional performances by Anthony Morgan, Melissa Freeman, Akhorahil of Thorngoth, additional composition by Kyron Ramsey
Turtle Tale	2014	Nintendo DS	
Sakura Fantasy	2015	Windows, OS X	Native American Flute performance by Alex Ripple
Regeria Hope	2015	Windows, OS X, Google Play	
Dʒrægɛn: A Game About a Dragon	2015	Windows	
Sakura Dungeon	2016	Windows	
Sacred Earth: Memory	TBD	Windows, OS X	Additional performances by Alex Ripple
Antipole DX	TBD	Nintendo 3DS, Nintendo Wii U	

== Awards and honors ==
In 2014, Parrish won the award for “Outstanding Contribution – Independent Composer” at the 2013 Annual Game Music Awards for Valdis Story: Abyssal City and Windhaven: Spirit of Flight.

In 2014, Parrish was nominated for “Outstanding Contribution – Independent Composer” at the 2014 Annual Game Music Awards for dʒrægɛn: A Game About a Dragon.
