= Bomberman Blitz =

2009 video game

- Developer: Hudson Soft
- Publisher: Hudson Soft
- Series: Bomberman
- Platforms: DSiWare
- Release: JP: October 7, 2009; PAL: November 6, 2009; NA: November 9, 2009
- Genre: Action
- Modes: Single-player, multiplayer

Bomberman Blitz (Note: Known in Japan as Anytime Bomberman (Japanese: いつでもボンバーマン, Hepburn: Itsudemo Bonbāman)) is a DSiWare game developed by Hudson Soft for the Nintendo DSi. It was released on October 7, 2009, in Japan, and in November of the same year in Europe and North America. The game was available for the Nintendo 3DS via the Nintendo eShop until the shop's closure in March 2023.

== Gameplay ==
As in other Bomberman games, the player drops bombs in attempt to eliminate other characters by having them be caught in the blast radius. There are also power-ups that give additional abilities, such as being able to pick up and throw bombs off-screen, or increases in character speed or bomb size.

The game has 10 stages to select from, each with unique features. The game also features a mode called Bomberman For Beginners where a player may learn the basic movements and strategies, and then later the more advanced along with combat.

Multiplayer was available both locally and over the internet with Nintendo Wi-Fi Connection but online multiplayer and online leaderboards are no longer usable because Nintendo Wi-Fi Connection services were shut down in May 2014. Eight players can play simultaneously locally, while only four could online. Like all Nintendo DS games, a Friend Code needed to be exchanged between two players if players wanted to play with other specific players.
