= Go! Go! Kokopolo 3D: Space Recipe for Disaster =

2017 action puzzle platform video game

- Developer: Tanukii Studios Limited
- Publishers: Circle Ent; Starsign
- Producer: Keith Webb
- Designer: Keith Webb
- Programmers: Gergely Kiss; Szilard Peteri; Adam Varga
- Artist: Keith Webb
- Composers: 2dB Music; Seb Burge
- Platform: Nintendo 3DS
- Release: NA: February 23, 2017; PAL: March 30, 2017; JP: October 11, 2017
- Genres: Action, Maze, Puzzle
- Mode: Single-player

Go! Go! Kokopolo 3D: Space Recipe for Disaster is a 2017 action maze video game, and sequel to the 2011 DSiWare game Go! Go! Kokopolo: Harmonious Forest Revenge. Developed by Tanukii Studios Limited, and published by Circle Entertainment, the game features 80 new stages, 10 new bosses, a completely new story, as well as other bonus modes and secrets.

Initially announced in June 2012, it was eventually released in North America on February 23, 2017, in PAL regions on March 30, 2017 and in Japan on October 11, 2017.

The game continues the series' self-proclaimed "chase 'em up" tradition of gameplay, drawing inspiration from a variety of different gameplay styles and merging them to form a puzzle-platform-maze-game hybrid. Several criticisms of the original have been addressed and fixed here, such as a more lenient difficulty curve, increased viewing area to allow players more time to react to obstacles, and the removal of certain limitations of the lower screen gameplay.

== Gameplay ==
Go! Go! Kokopolo 3D introduces an expanded viewing area on the top screen, and additional enemy slots on the low screen

At its core, the game follows the same basic premise as the original, as the goal is to clear all stages of wandering enemies by angering them and luring them into the jaws of a carnivorous plant. As with the first game, this is done by approaching enemies, scratching them, then running away whilst they chase the player around the stage's mazelike structures. Large combinations of enemies can be chained together if the player uses route efficiency to their advantage, and quick reflexes are needed to avoid obstacles.

Once enemies are fed to the plant, they are digested and appear on the lower screen, where the player can use the touch pad to tap them for bonuses. This premise is repeated throughout the game's main stages, but many obstacles such as switches, traps and puzzles add to the variety to keep the player on their toes.

Go! Go! Kokopolo 3D addresses some of the issues of the original, such as a more balanced difficulty curve, and an increased view area provided by the 3DS' higher resolution allows players to plan their routes better, giving extra time to react to obstacles. The limit imposed on the number of enemies that can be eaten at once from the first game has also been removed to improve the flow of gameplay.

The main story mode offers 3 different routes through the game, each traversed by one of the game's 3 main protagonists. Once each route is cleared, the final stages are unlocked.

As per the original, secret cards can be unlocked in the stages, and this time they contain a specific enemy order, which allows players to find hidden Space Treasures, to access the proper ending. Boss stages now take place on the top screen only, and display a useful hint on the lower screen for convenience. The microphone is still used in several occasions to awaken sleeping enemies and a handful of other uses.

The 3D aspect of the game is purely visual, as background planes are displayed further into the distance, to create the feeling of depth, and does not effect the gameplay in any way.

== Plot ==
=== Story ===
The new cast of characters introduced in Go! Go! Kokopolo 3D: Space Recipe for Disaster

The game opens with a short animated cutscene that pays homage to the original. The space rabbit Mikosuki is soaring through the cosmos, holding on to a sacred stone tablet that depicts the infamous recipe of immortality. Whilst trying to avoid a sudden meteor onslaught, he is struck by a comet, and the tablet breaks into 4 separate pieces – 3 of which tumble to the earth below. The 3 pieces each find their way separately into the hands of the game's 3 main protagonists – Kokopolo, Tatsumo and Jinbe. Each vows to track down the other pieces and reassemble the whole tablet to learn the secrets of immortality, and so the madcap adventure begins.

=== Characters ===
- Kokopolo: A hyperactive wildcat, and one of the "heroes" of Go! Go! Kokopolo 3D. Obsessed with learning the secret recipe of immortality.
- Tatsumo: A laid-back okapi. Kokopolo's buddy, who tags along on the adventure, for no real reason other than seemingly attempting to cure his own boredom.
- Jinbe: A peaceful sky-guardian, and the third main character in the game. He initially wants to find the recipe for immortality for peaceful and altruistic reasons.
- Mikosuki: A space rabbit, and the last male of his species. Guardian of the fabled recipe of immortality.

== Development and release ==
Go! Go! Kokopolo 3D: Space Recipe for Disaster was initially thought to be a port of the original DSiWare game, but was later revealed to be a new product. According to the developers, after the success of the original, a sequel was always planned taking into account the added capabilities of the 3DS hardware. Time was spent early in development trying to work out how to best utilize the additional elements of the 3DS, such as adding stereoscopic depth to the visuals, and the team finally settled on pushing the backgrounds back into the distance to create the 3D effect. Other ideas such as having walls pop out of the screen proved to be too visually confusing, so the safest option was chosen.

Player feedback was taken into account in terms of enemy and obstacle placement to make the game less challenging to casual fans, but the team decided to include additional challenges, such as Space Treasures, to ensure expert players had something extra to aim towards.

Go! Go! Kokopolo 3D was originally announced as being considered for development in mid-2012, not long after the original's debut in Japan, and several promotional materials, including exclusive looks at the new bosses, were unveiled by several websites including WiiItalia, Nintendo Okie and Nintendo Life. However, due to other commitments by the development and programming team, the project was delayed until all members were available to dedicate more time to development. Full development recommenced in early 2016.

As with the first game, Tanukii Studios' Keith Webb took on the role of designer and producer, whilst the programming team consisted of the same coders who worked on the first game, however re-formed under the new moniker Berries and Co. Circle Entertainment took on publishing duties.

A Twitter post by Circle Entertainment in January 2017 declared 2017 to be "the year of kokopolo" as an official announcement of its release drawing near. The game was released in North America on February 23, 2017 PAL regions on March 3, 2017 and later in Japan on October 11, 2017 due to additional time spent focusing on localization.

As with the first game, a post-release bug was found preventing certain players from defeating one of the later Boss stages. A simple workaround was found, by simply turning the 3D slider down, but an official patch was released shortly after to fix this issue, as well as a few other minor bugs.

== Reception ==
Reception

Aggregate scores
Aggregator	Score
GameRankings	85.00%
Metacritic	84/100

Review scores
Publication	Score
Nintendo Life	9/10
F Nintendo	9/10
Pure Nintendo	9/10
Max Console	9/10
Cubed 3	8/10
Nintendo Okie	4/5
Gaming Boulevard	4/5
Juegos ADN	8.5/10
Nintendo Force	75/100
Famitsu	29/40

Go! Go! Kokopolo 3D: Space Recipe for Disaster received very favorable reviews, several of which awarded it 9/10, with praise being directed at its quirky humor and fast-paced gameplay.

Lee Mayer of Nintendo Life commented that "Tanukii Studios clearly spent a lot of time designing each and every aspect of this game with thought and care. Level design is excellent." He also claimed "Go! Go! Kokopolo 3D is a visual treat for fans of pixel art and fancy sprite work" and that "hopefully, this imaginative and charming sequel will find the audience and success it clearly deserves."

Reviewers also noted that the difficulty balance had been improved over the first one, allowing for a more accessible game to new players.

Based purely on its obscurity, Go! Go! Kokopolo 3D: Space Recipe for Disaster got a mention for a Destructoid consideration for Game of Year 2017.

Go! Go! Kokopolo holds the number 6 position in the "Best Nintendo 3DS Games of All Time" on OpenCritic.

== Future ==
Many reviewers have expressed their desire to see either an expanded port, or a brand-new iteration of the game on the Nintendo Switch in the near future, and the development team have expressed their desire to continue the series, hinting that a Switch version may be a possibility.

On June 13, 2018, Tanukii Studios has announced a third game in the series, titled "Go! Go! Kokopolo DX: Super Scratch Cat Fever" and it will be released on the Nintendo Switch sometime in the near future.
