= Spin Six =

2009 video game

- Developer: Zener Works
- Publisher: Nintendo
- Platform: Nintendo DS
- Release: JP: April 1, 2009; NA: June 21, 2010; EU: December 31, 2010
- Genre: Puzzle
- Mode: Single-player

Spin Six, known in Japan as KuruKuru Action: KuruPachi 6 (Note: Japanese: くるくるアクション くるパチ6, Hepburn: KuruKuru Akushon KuruPachi 6), is a puzzle video game developed by Zener Works and published by Nintendo for the Nintendo DSi's DSiWare service. It was released in Japan in 2009 and 2010 internationally. It is a spin-off of Nintendo and Creatures Inc.'s Chee-Chai Alien series and the first to not be developed by Creatures.

== Gameplay ==
The player matches balls with different values to gain points. Balls marked "3" disappear when 3 or more are matched, with the same applying to those marked "4", "5" and "6". The player can swap the positions of balls in a 2 by 2 square. Combos that grant extra points occur when a series of chains are attained consecutively.

== Reception ==
Reception

Aggregate score
Aggregator	Score
Metacritic	74/100

Review scores
Publication	Score
Eurogamer	7/10
IGN	8/10
Nintendo Life	8/10 stars
Official Nintendo Magazine	70%

The game received above-average reviews according to the review aggregation website Metacritic. Lucas M. Thomas of IGN praised its versatile game design and called it one of the best puzzle games on the DSiWare service. Likewise, Andrew Wight of Nintendo Life also praised its addictive gameplay and value.
