= Go! Go! Kokopolo =

2011 video game

Go! Go! Kokopolo – Harmonious Forest Revenge
- Developer: Tanukii Studios Limited
- Publishers: Tanukii Studios Limited; Room 4 Games Ltd; Arc System Works (JP); Limited Run Games
- Producer: Keith Webb
- Designer: Keith Webb
- Programmers: Gergely Kiss; Szilard Peteri
- Artist: Keith Webb
- Composer: 2dB Music
- Platforms: Nintendo DSi (DSiWare), Nintendo 3DS
- Release: Nintendo DSi: PAL: August 4, 2011; NA: August 11, 2011; JP: May 30, 2012; 3DS; September 2, 2022
- Genres: Action, Maze game, Puzzle
- Mode: Single-player

Go! Go! Kokopolo – Harmonious Forest Revenge is a 2011 action maze video game developed and published by Tanukii Studios Limited on DSiWare, for the Nintendo DSi game system. The game is described by the developers as the "world's first chase-'em-up" and utilizes a hybrid of different gameplay styles, such as maze games, platformers and puzzle elements to create a unique arcade experience. In September 2022, the game was re-released for Nintendo 3DS, both physically and digitally, to commemorate its tenth anniversary.

The developers cite arcade classics such as Pac-Man, Flicky, Door Door and ChuChu Rocket! as inspiration for the main gameplay mechanics, and video game characters, such as Wario, for the mischievous humor abundant in the game. Go! Go! Kokopolo was met with very favorable reviews upon its release. Several minor criticisms were leveled at the difficulty of the game, especially in later stages, but an easy mode was included to help lend an easy learning curve for more novice players. The game also featured highly in the Best of 2011 lists on Joystiq, Wiiloveit.com, IGN and Nintendo Life. A sequel was released in 2017 for the Nintendo 3DS, called Go! Go! Kokopolo 3D: Space Recipe for Disaster

== Gameplay ==
Screenshot of Go! Go! Kokopolo. The enemies chase Kokopolo on the top screen...

The goal of each stage is to clear the map of all the peaceful enemy characters, many of which will not attack until provoked. The player takes control of Kokopolo (or Tatsumo) who can stroll around the stages with the D-Pad, or dash quickly with one of the shoulder buttons. Knowing when to walk and when to dash is actually a key component of this game. The player can also jump with the A button or scratch with the B button. All of these actions take place on the top screen.

Upon beginning a stage, the player's objective is to locate the enemies, who are confined to specific paths, and scratch them in order to turn them angry. Once they become angry, they lunge in the direction of the player, attempting to harm them. If the player does not dash away, they will get hit and lose some energy. However, if they do dash away, then an epic chase begins. Any angry enemies will chase a dashing player, following their every move, until the enemies are lured into the clutches of a hungry carnivorous plant. These Snap Snap plants are located in each stage, and all enemies must be lured into its mouth in order to be destroyed.

It is possible to create long chains, of up to 20 enemies at a time, by using a move called the "Slash Dash". This allows the player to slash other enemies whilst being chased, and not to lose speed. Long chains of enemies get the most points, but they can also be dangerous as they leave a deadly trail behind the player until they are defeated.

When enemies are eaten by the Snap Snap plant, they appear on the lower screen, where the stomach of the plant is shown. In order to help the plant digest the enemies, and destroy them once and for all, the player has to tap on the enemy's portrait with the stylus, or their thumb. If done correctly, a piece of fruit is spat out into the stage as a reward, but if done incorrectly, a bomb is thrown out. The lower screen also doubles up as a helpful map when the plant's stomach is empty.

... and end up in the stomach of the plant on the lower screen.

Once the level is cleared of enemies, the player continues to the next. There are 80 stages in all, spread over a variety of worlds, and introducing new enemies and hazards as the game progresses. Every 8th stage is a Boss Battle, which is spread over both screens, and employs a variety of skills to defeat the boss, most of which involve tricking it into destroying itself.

The game also occasionally uses the microphone. Most notably to shout into and wake up sleeping Snap Snap plants, or to blow into in order to free the player from the clutches of various enemies.

Bonus rounds are unlocked by collecting 20 fruits whilst in mid-air, in order to reveal secret bonus doors hidden in every level. Collectable Scratch Cards are found by chasing small butterflies located in every stage ending in 1, 3, 5 or 7.

== Plot ==
=== Story ===
The game opens with the wildcat, Kokopolo taking a nap. His friend, Tatsumo, is under a tree, reading a book. In the sky, a sky-guardian, Jinbe, quickly flies across the sky, playing a tune on his mystical set of bongo drums. By accident, one of the bongo drums becomes dislodged, and flies into the dense forest below.

The misplaced bongo impacts directly on Kokopolo's head, which wakes him up. Angry after being awoken, Kokopolo glances upwards, spotting the Sky-Guardian flying away, and vows revenge on all the peaceful woodland creatures for this heinous act. Kokopolo leaps out of his hammock, grabs his buddy Tatsumo, and sets off on a furious quest to bring chaos and disruption to the entire land.

=== Characters ===
- Kokopolo: A hyperactive wildcat, and the "hero" of Go! Go! Kokopolo. Gets riled up at the slightest annoyance, and decides to take it out on everyone by ruining their fun.
- Tatsumo: A laid-back okapi. Kokopolo's buddy, who rarely gets involved in Kokopolo's insane antics, preferring a peaceful life instead.
- Jinbe: A peaceful sky-guardian, and the main "enemy" of the game. Due to accidentally annoying Kokopolo, he has been marked as the unwitting victim of Kokopolo's revenge.
- Mech-Jinbe: A robot created by Jinbe to bring Kokopolo to justice.
- Houdini Starfish: A mysterious, yet wise starfish. Is the only creature in existence who can annoy Kokopolo.

== Development and release ==
Go! Go! Kokopolo was first featured in a series of Developer's Diaries in the UK magazine NGamer back in late 2008. It followed the early stages of production of the game, from its initial conception as right up to the point of release.

Lead designer Keith Webb stated that one of the original inspirations for the game came from a stray white cat, that was adopted by his family when he was younger, which would occasionally lash-out and scratch people uncontrollably, then frantically dash away. This, along with a passion for classic arcade games such as Pac-Man and Flicky, led Webb to develop the unique gameplay mechanic on which the entire game revolves around.

After considering developing the game for the Neo Geo Pocket, then later the Game Boy Advance, Webb later revised the plan to bring it to the Nintendo DS, years later, and make use of the dual-screen layout for additional gameplay mechanics. Webb commented that at this time he planned out the entire game meticulously, so that when it went into full production, it would be very easy to develop with additional time allowed for tweaking, if needed. At this point, Webb worked on the entire Graphics set for the game, getting it ready to show to potential publishers to gauge any interest.

After several unsuccessful attempts to get a publisher on board, Webb eventually got in contact with a small Hungarian team of programmers, Room 4 Games Limited, to help get the game ready for release on the then newly announced DSiWare service. Funded entirely by Webb, the coding team consisted of 2 programmers, Szilard Peteri and Gergely Kiss. Kiss provided most of the gameplay programming for the game, while Peteri was responsible for the engine code. Webb took on duties as the producer, lead designer and lead artist / animator on the project, music was provided by 2 dB music production and sound effects by Hungarian team, Noteblender.

A multiplayer mode was planned at one point early in development, but was considered to be too risky to implement with such a small team, and was decided to be saved for any potential sequels. The layouts of the stages in the game went through several iterations, as the developers felt that this was one of the most important aspects of the game to get right, due to the limited viewport of the DSi's screen resolution. The developers also talked about including a secret ending in the game, which they believed no-one would ever find.

The Game was released in the PAL region on August 4, 2011, and in North America on August 11, 2011. Once released, a game-breaking bug was found in the game, which prevented players from passing a certain boss. The developers quickly located and fixed this bug, which was solved with an automatic update. Embarrassed by this, Webb released a small humorous comic strip, based on the glitch, to apologize to players whilst they were waiting for it to be fixed. On May 30, 2012 it was released in Japan.

On April 6, 2012, a secret "peaceful" ending to the game was discovered by Alejandro Anez, and uploaded to YouTube. The developers announced that Anez's name would appear in some form in a sequel or spin-off as a reward for being the first player to find the secret ending, which was discovered by simply refusing to attack the first enemy in the game.

The game and its sequel Go! Go! Kokopolo 3D: Space Recipe for Disaster were later announced on June 6, 2022 to be physically released for its 10th anniversary by Limited Run Games for the Nintendo 3DS, and they were released on September 2, 2022. The games came in 3 different versions: the standard edition of the 2 games, a dual pack with both games, and a collector's edition. It is one of the last 3DS games to be released.

== Reception ==
Reception

Aggregate score
Aggregator	Score
Metacritic	72/100

Review scores
Publication	Score
Eurogamer	6/10
GamesMaster	75%
IGN	8.5/10
NGamer	60%
Nintendo Life	8/10
Official Nintendo Magazine	76%

Since its release, Go! Go! Kokopolo received "mixed or average reviews" according to the review aggregation website Metacritic.

Luke Plunkett of Kotaku Australia described the game as a "hidden gem", and Lucas M. Thomas of IGN commented that it was "a joy to see DSiWare still bringing out fresh concepts and creative new characters like this" and that the game is "bold, imaginative and different than anything you've ever played before."

Several reviewers criticized the high level of challenge found in the game, and in some cases suggested it may have benefited from an easier difficulty setting. However, many commented positively on the length of the game and the quality of the presentation, stating that it was obviously planned as a full-retail release, and lost nothing in the transition to the DSiWare service. The game received its lowest score from NGamer, which notably was the magazine that gave it the most exposure in the first place, eventually leading to its creation.

At the end of 2011 the game was nominated for several awards, including IGN's best of 2011 awards, Nintendo Life's "game of the year awards" and Wiiloveit.com's DSiWare game of the year award, in which it won second place. The video gaming blog Joystiq also included the game in their 2011 Buyers Guide.

== Sequel ==
On August 29, 2012, a sequel was announced, titled Go! Go! Kokopolo 3D: Space Recipe for Disaster, and it was released on February 23, 2017 on the Nintendo eShop. It includes over 80 new stages and 10 new bosses for the player—who can now collect many different secret recipe cards throughout the game—to destroy; also, the enemies from the first game have returned in the sequel.
