= System Flaw =

2009 video game

- North American box art
- Developer: Visual Impact
- Publisher: Storm City Games
- Designer: Visual Impact
- Platforms: Nintendo DSi, DSiWare
- Release: Retail: NA: October 27, 2009; EU: January 21, 2011; DSiWare: NA: April 26, 2010; EU: April 16, 2010
- Genre: Shooter
- Modes: Single-player, multiplayer

System Flaw (known as System Flaw Recruit as a DSiWare title) is an action shooter video game developed by American studio Storm City Games and released exclusively for the Nintendo DSi on October 27, 2009 in the United States and for DSiWare in North America on April 26, 2010, and Europe on April 16, 2010. This is the first Nintendo DSi-exclusive game. The game turns a player's surroundings into the playing environment using the rear-facing camera. The objective is to rotate the console around and defeat enemies known as flaws.
