= Valdis Story: Abyssal City =

2013 video game

- Developer: Endless Fluff
- Publisher: Endless Fluff
- Composer: Zack Parrish
- Engine: GameMaker
- Platforms: Microsoft Windows, OS X
- Release: September 8, 2013
- Genres: Platform-adventure, Role-playing video game, Metroidvania
- Mode: Single-player

Valdis Story: Abyssal City is a 2013 action-adventure platform game developed by American indie studio Endless Fluff. It was funded by a successful Kickstarter campaign which concluded on April 27, 2012 with $49,574 raised, over six times its $8000 goal.

== Plot ==
According to legend, long ago the Goddess Valdis birthed two daughters into the world; one of Light (Alagath) and one of Darkness (Myrgato). One day Myrgato attacked her in her home city of Sitheil. Alagath arrived too late to prevent this, and her subsequent battle with her sister sunk the holy city.

During the present day, while on a sea voyage in search of a Knight in Myrgato's Dark Army, the Four Protagonists (Reina, Wyatt, Gilda, and Vladyn) are attacked by massive sea creatures and sucked into the submerged city of Sitheil. Sitheil-once believed to have been lost-persists underwater; the submerged city is encased in a barrier that allows for the remaining humans and feral creatures in it to live underwater. Alagaths' Angels and Myrgato's Demons still occupy areas of the city, vying for supremacy.

Each of the four protagonists set out to find the ship's crew, from whom they have been separated. Aided by the few remaining humans in Sitheil across several towns, the protagonists manage to find each other and their crew whilst uncovering the truth behind Valdis' supposed death and the war between Alagath and Myrgato that is consuming their world.

According to old texts strewn about, the world of Erebus is a living entity which is connected to all humans through spiritual energy. Initially, only a few humans were able to wield large amounts of this energy, but through humanity's history more and more people were able to tap into this unseen energy. Powerful beings from another world would emerge on Erebus, drawn by this powerful energy. These "Tyrant Gods" would rule over humanity, until a small tribe led a rebellion against them. When the rebellion's leader was assassinated, his grief-stricken wife—Valdis—would awaken to her powers over death and lead humanity towards victory.

Becoming a Goddess, she would then create a daughter of Light (Alagath) and a daughter of Darkness (Myrgato) to watch over humanity in her stead. Wishing to live in solitude, Valdis would then live among nomadic warrior tribes (The Goibniu) in frozen wastelands. Living amongst them would reignite her passions and lead her to becoming an active part of Erebus once more. The frozen wasteland she inhabited would then become the prosperous city of Sitheil, with Valdis as its leading figure.

Towards the end of the game the protagonists find Valdis during her final moments of life, where she reveals that it was both of her daughters whom attacked her, not just one. They did so out of fear of her power over death and fear of the Goibniu's acquired knowledge of weaponry and techniques in defeating the Gods. In her final moments she laments that her daughters became as Tyrannical as the Gods she freed humanity of many years ago. She reveals that Reina is her daughter; she precipitated the protagonist's capsized ship to bring Reina to her; and that Wyatt's father was a Goibniu whom assisted her in getting Reina out of Sitheil and who also bred with a powerful demon for the explicit purpose of having strong offspring who could protect Reina. Before she dies she informs Reina that her sisters do not know of her existence, and that she must eliminate her two mistakes.

As the protagonists make their way out of the now inundated city, they all form their own personal resolves to bring the war between Myrgato and Alagath to an end, with Reina as their leading figure.

== Gameplay ==
Valdis Story is a side-scroller in which the player controls one of four protagonists. Each can run, jump, traverse obstacles, and use unique weaponry and magic to defeat enemies. The undersea city consists of several zones, between which the player can freely move. The player will acquire many items throughout their journey, and some of them will grant new abilities; for example, they will be able to create platforms out of ice, which will allow them to access areas that were previously inaccessible. The game contains many RPG elements; enemies will drop loot (i.e., better equipment), and the player character gains experience from combat. As they level up, the player will be able to acquire new combat skills from the in-game skill tree.

== Reception ==
Valdis Story received positive reviews, and holds an average of 83/100 on aggregate web site Metacritic. Andrew Barker of RPGFan gave it 93%, saying he "had a wonderful time playing Valdis Story. Time and time again it exceeded my expectations, and it's a privilege that I was able to play and review it." Destructoid awarded the game 9/10, concluding that it "simultaneously succeeds as both an action platformer and a Metroidvania with RPG elements, and it's a must-play for fans of either genre."
