= Pop (video game) =

2008 video game

- Developer: Nnooo
- Publisher: Nnooo: JP: Electronic Arts
- Platforms: Wii (WiiWare), Nintendo DSi (DSiWare), iOS
- Release: WiiWare: NA: May 12, 2008; PAL: July 4, 2008; JP: July 29, 2008; iOS: WW: March 5, 2009; DSiWare: PAL: August 21, 2009; NA: August 24, 2009
- Genre: Puzzle game
- Modes: Single-player, multiplayer

Pop is a WiiWare and iOS video game by Australian developer Nnooo. The game was released in 2008, in North America on May 12 as a WiiWare launch title, and in Europe on July 4. It was released by Electronic Arts in Japan on July 29 of the same year. The iOS version was released on the App Store on March 5, 2009. The game was also released for the DSiWare service under the title Pop+ Solo.

== Gameplay ==
Pop involves the player popping bubbles to score points against a time limit. Players click on bubbles that float up the screen using the Wii Remote, gaining bonus points if popping successions of bubbles, and adding more time to the clock.

The game also supports competitive multiplayer for up to 4 players, which involves each player trying to score as many points as possible in a set time limit. Power-ups can also be collected to hinder the other players. These include darkening the whole screen save for the area around the collecting player's cursor, or shocking opponents with a lightning bolt to stop them from popping bubbles.

Nic Watt, creative director of Nnooo, gave more detail regarding the multiplier system: "To create a chain you must pop only the same color of bubbles consecutively. If you miss (pop on the background), wait too long between popping or pop a different colour the chain will break. Also while you are chaining your score and time from each bubble is stored in a tally below the cursor. This means that until you break your chain neither your main score nor the main timer will increase so if you are not careful you can run out of time!"

== iOS version ==
The iOS version of the game was released on March 5, 2009. It features 6 main game modes: Training, normal, advanced, chill, timed and bonus mode. It also features 3 bonus rounds. Players pop bubbles by touching them and attempt to build chains of the same colour and pump them to make them larger. The aim of the game is to get highscores and earn all 72 medals.

=== Pop: Lite & Chill ===
Pop: Lite & Pop: Chill are stripped-down versions of Pop for iOS:

- Pop: Lite version is free and includes a training mode and an extra mode of gameplay that is unique to the edition.
- Pop: Chill is the Chill mode from the full version of Pop.

== DSi version ==
A DSi version of the game, Pop+ Solo, was released as a downloadable DSiWare game for the Nintendo DSi. It cost 500 Nintendo Points.

== Reception ==
The WiiWare version of Pop received an 8/10 from WiiWare World as they believed the game offers enough depth and enjoyment to keep the player coming back for short bursts of play. IGN however believed the game was "simplistic and overly repetitive", giving it a 6/10.
