= Crystal Monsters =

2008 role-playing video game

- Developer: Gameloft
- Publisher: Gameloft
- Producers: Sophie Vo; Varun Gupta
- Designer: Rahul Sehgal
- Programmer: Skreenath M
- Artists: Nitin Dhamse; Vaibhav Pawar; Mahesh Nemahi
- Composer: Wonseok Lee
- Platforms: Nintendo DSiWare, mobile phone
- Release: Mobile phone: JP: July 8, 2008; DSiWare: NA: July 26, 2010; EU: July 30, 2010
- Genre: Role-playing
- Mode: Single player

Crystal Monsters, originally released in Japan in 2008 as Monster Chronicle for mobile phone, is a role-playing video game developed by Gameloft for Nintendo DSiWare. The game was released in PAL regions on July 30, 2010, and in North America on July 26, 2010.

Crystal Monsters is played in a third-person view overhead perspective and takes place in a fictional world called Earth in which the player navigates the main character.

== Gameplay ==
The gameplay of Crystal Monsters involves the capture and training of a variety of creatures called monsters. Monsters can learn up to four moves called skills. Just like in most role-playing video games, monsters are able to gain experience points and level up after battles, making them stronger.

The game uses a turn-based system. Whenever the player encounters a wild monster or challenges a trainer, the screen changes to a battle scene with the opposing monsters and an option menu. The player may have up to three monsters on your team. You can attack, pass to the next monster on the team, use an item or flee the fight.

Most of the battles the player faces are random battles with wild monsters, as there is a low number of trainers, bosses and mid-bosses in this game. Wild monsters can be found in routes, dungeons, sidequests, etc. The encounter rate is inconsistent, though, as monsters may appear often or pop up only rarely.

Essence Cores of each monster type are used to capture wild monsters, though they may break free at times. The less HP the monster has, the greater the percentage chances. If it is captured, it will be put in storage.

The player cannot capture a trainer's monster, boss or mid-boss. Evolution Stones can be used to evolve most monsters. Upon evolving, monsters learn additional skills and gain higher stats. There are two stages of evolution: Plus and Mega. They can occur after a monster reaches a certain level. There are 166 monsters in the game, though the player can only own 20 and most of them are the same just with recoloured evolutions.

== Setting and plot ==
The player controls the protagonist from an overhead perspective and navigates him around a fictional world called Earth with the goal of becoming the greatest trainer. There are two kinds of people in this world: those who can see monsters (called Neo-Seeds) and those who cannot (Pure-Breeds).

This game features a total of 9 towns, along with different terrains, such as routes, dungeons, etc. The protagonist is a young boy who lives in Dicot. He has a dream of being given a choice of one of 3 different starter monsters by his friend Bishop: A Fire-type (Kiticon), Water-type (Tadpolaris) or Plant-type (Flowerpower). After waking up in school and realising it was all a dream, he goes outside and sees a bully named Rudiger steal Bishop's Essence Core. He confronts Rudiger at the Ruins and gets Bishop's EC back, receiving the same starter monster that he chose in the dream. He discovers that he is a Neo-Seed and soon finds himself embarking on a quest throughout the Earth to investigate why Final Monsters (the bosses of all monsters) have become very aggressive.

== Reception ==
Lucas M. Thomas of IGN criticized Crystal Monsters for being "unbalanced in monster selection, and boringly repetitive."

Marcel van Duyn of Nintendo Life said "Although it might be almost sickening to Pokémon fans to see how similar this is to their beloved franchise, we can't really be too critical of it. It's only 500 DSi Points (300 less than most Gameloft games), and for what it is, it's actually quite a decent, if simple, imitation."

Official Nintendo Magazine UK said “A shameless imitation of a game that's infinitely better in every department.”

Game review aggregation website GameRankings gave it a rating of 54.33% based on 3 reviews.

== Sequel ==
A second game, Monster Chronicle 2, was released for mobile phones in Japan in 2009. The game was not released in North America nor Europe. It features an all-new story and new monsters.
