= Furry Legends =

- Developer: Gamelion Studios
- Publisher: Gamelion Studios (Note: BREW and Android versions published by SkyZone Entertainment.)
- Platforms: Wii, Bada, Mobile phone, Nintendo DS, Android
- Release: Furry Legends (2D) March 24, 2010: Mobile phone; EU: March 24, 2010; NA: March 30, 2010; Android; WW: July 20, 2010; DSiWare; NA: October 13, 2011; PAL: November 3, 2011; Furry Legends (3D) July 19, 2010: WiiWare; NA: July 19, 2010; PAL: August 20, 2010; Bada; WW: September 16, 2010
- Genres: Puzzle-platform (3D); Platform-adventure (2D)
- Mode: Single-player

Furry Legends is a video game franchise consisting of three games developed by Gamelion Studios. An entry in the franchise, Furry Legends, is a physics-based 3D puzzle-platformer released in 2010 for the WiiWare and Bada platforms . A prequel to the title, also entitled Furry Legends, was released for BREW and Android devices in 2010, and DSiWare in 2011. A spinoff titled Boom Boom Squaries was released exclusively for DSiWare in 2011.

== Gameplay ==
Players can control Leilas' Furballs by using the Wii Remote and Nunchuk. Using the analogue stick on the Nunchuk makes Furballs rolling to the left and right and control their flight a bit. The A button makes character jumping. Pressing Z button, choosing direction and shaking the Wii Remote allows to attack Sqauries and other objects. Every Furball has the unique abilities that can be released by B button when the character's level of FurPower is high enough.

== Development ==
The development process was revealed by the team in many interviews done by websites interested in the gaming industry.

== Release ==
The game was published by SkyZone Entertainment through the Verizon Wireless network for the BREW and Android Market platforms. Furry Legends for Bada was officially announced on February 15, 2010, at the Mobile World Congress in Barcelona. The game serves as a prequel to the 3D version of Furry Legends and was released in 2010.

A puzzle game spinoff titled Boom Boom Squaries was released exclusively for DSiWare in Europe and Australia on January 28, 2011, and in North America on February 7, 2011.

== Reception ==
Reception

Aggregate score
| Aggregator | Score | |
| Aggregator | DS | Wii |
|---|---|---|
| Metacritic | 47/100 | 58/100 |

Review scores
| Publication | Score | |
| Publication | DS | Wii |
|---|---|---|
| IGN | | 6/10 |
| Nintendo Life | 7/10 | 7/10 |
| Nintendo World Report | | 8/10 |

Furry Legends for WiiWare and DSiWare received "mixed or average" and "generally unfavorable" reviews, respectively, according to review aggregator platform Metacritic. IGN awarded the WiiWare version of the game a score of 6 out of 10, criticising the length, physics and gameplay.
