= Thorium Wars =

2009 video game

- Developer: 3PM Games
- Publisher: Big John Games
- Platform: Nintendo DS
- Release: NA: October 5, 2009; EU: October 8, 2010
- Genre: Vehicular combat
- Mode: Single-player

Thorium Wars is a vehicular combat video game developed by 3PM Games and published by Big John Games for Nintendo DS in 2009.

== Reception ==
Reception

Aggregate score
Aggregator	Score
Metacritic	66/100

Review scores
Publication	Score
Eurogamer	5/10
IGN	5.5/10
Nintendo Life	8/10
Nintendo World Report	8/10
Official Nintendo Magazine	78%

The game received "average" reviews according to the review aggregation website Metacritic.

== Sequel ==
A sequel called Thorium Wars: Attack of the Skyfighter was released for Nintendo 3DS in 2014-2018.
