= Cosmos X2 =

2010 video game

- Developer: Saturnine Games
- Publisher: Saturnine Games
- Platform: Nintendo DSi
- Release: NA: August 30, 2010; EU: September 15, 2011
- Genre: Shoot 'em up
- Mode: Single-player

Cosmos X2 is a Shoot em’ Up for Nintendo's DSiWare service. Published and developed by American studio Saturnine Games, Cosmos X2 puts players in the titular ship to stop an alien invasion through six long stages. The game was developed in 2007 and was finally released on August 30, 2010, in North America for 500 points and September 15, 2011, in Europe for 200 points.

== Story ==
Taking place in a nameless alien planetary system, the humans of the system have been developing spacecraft capable of traveling the entire planetary system with ease. Two Cosmos class ships are created: the Cosmos X1 and X2. As the X1 goes on its maiden voyage through the planetary system, it disappears part-way through. Ensign Daverdy is assigned to pilot the Cosmos X2, the fighter variant of the Cosmos craft, and discover what happened to the X1. Upon reaching the point where Cosmos X1 disappeared, Daverdy comes across an alien invasion fleet that has captured the X1 and are on their way to his home world.

== Gameplay ==
Gameplay screenshot

The primary action takes place on the top screen with all meters, map, character messages and choices at the bottom. Players control the Cosmos X2 to stop the alien invasion and travel to its source. The Cosmos X2 has a special Alignment system that allows it to change between two chosen alignments at will. The player has several meters to watch. One meter is the Charge meter which automatically charges the X2's Shield ability; if the player is hit while this meter is charging or is fully charged, then the meter will reset. Another meter is the Level-Up meter which increases when the player reaches a certain number of points. The level-ups are randomized and range from weapon upgrades to missile upgrades. The ship has an energy meter that, when depleted when one alignment is equipped, will allow the player to use the other alignment until they complete the stage. If both of the player's alignment energy meters are drained, then the ship is destroyed and the game is over.

The three Alignments include Red, Green and Blue. The Red Alignment is the Power Alignment which is capable of firing slow, small, but powerful straight forward shots. The shield to the Power Alignment is a type of Bomb weapon that surrounds the ship in a ring of explosions. The Blue Alignment is the Attraction Alignment which equips the Cosmos X2 with weak, but plentiful homing shots and a shield that absorbs enemy shots that are used as supplemental energy. The Green Alignment is the Repulsion Alignment which fires widely spread shots and features a shield that deflects enemy shots which harms enemies in its path. Other weapons include Missile pick-ups, taken from destroyed enemies or objects. The player can hold up to three Missiles at a time and with Level-Upgrades would home-in on enemies.

== Development ==
Cosmos X2 was first announced for the Nintendo DS in 2007, with it being developed by Saturnine Games and published by UK publisher Alten8. By 2010, it was announced it would be released on the Nintendo DSi through DSiWare. It was released on August 30th, 2010, with Saturnine Games becoming both publisher and developer of the game.

== Reception ==
Reception

Aggregate score
Aggregator	Score
Metacritic	54/100

Review scores
Publication	Score
IGN	7/10
Nintendo Life	6/10
Official Nintendo Magazine	60%

Cosmos X2 received mixed reviews from video game critics.
