= Magnetic Joe =

2006 video game

- Developer: Most Wanted Entertainment
- Publisher: HD Publishing
- Designer: Ferenc Thier
- Programmer: Ferenc Thier
- Artists: Ferenc Thier; Csaba Kemeri
- Platforms: Mobile, iPhone, Sidewards
- Release: 2006
- Genre: Puzzle-platform
- Mode: Single-player

Magnetic Joe is a 2006 puzzle-platform game developed for mobile phones by Hungarian studio Most Wanted Entertainment and published by HD publishing in 2006. The objective is to guide a magnetic metal ball, known as Joe, to a designated exit in each level using various magnetic forces.

== Gameplay ==
The game features a one-button control scheme where the player presses a single button, or touches the screen, to activate Joe's magnetism. When Joe passes near a magnetic cell, his magnetism activates. The player can see a lightning effect between Joe and the magnet, and Joe moves towards the magnet. As he moves closer to the magnet, his movement and rotation changes. The player can control the ball's movement by timing when the magnetism is activated. Different magnets push or pull the ball in different directions and are marked accordingly.

Joe can move around by rolling and bouncing. However, frequent hazards on the map, such as spiked floors and walls, add a challenge to this form of movement.

== Release ==
The original game was released in 2006 for mobile phones. It includes 50 levels divided into 3 "worlds". Randomly generated 'secret' levels can be played by entering a code. Levels are generated based on the code entered.

== Reception ==
The original game was well received by the gaming press, praising its simple and great game mechanics. It won a 'best casual game' award in 2006. "Magnetic Joe is incredibly simple and incredibly addictive, the game can be frustrating and extremely rewarding. Absolutely brilliant."

== Legacy ==
=== Magnetic Joe 2 (mobile / J2ME) ===
The second game added teleporters, a cannon, a lift, and breakable walls. New game characters are Josephine (Joe's Girlfriend), Invisible Joe, Bad Joe, and Robot Joe. In "collect mode", the player has to first find three "Little Joe"-s before the exits are activated and it's possible to win. In "enemy mode", there are enemies to avoid in the levels. Magnetic Joe 2 has a skateboarding minigame.

=== Magnetic Joe (Nintendo DSi) ===
A Nintendo DSi version of the game added a story mode and local wi-fi multiplayer. In story mode, the player must complete levels through several "worlds" that feature enemies, obstacles, and bosses unique to that world. In the wi-fi multiplayer player challenge, two players play on the same level at once.

There are three modes: Classic, Time, and Collect. Classic mode has the same rules as the original mobile game. In Time Mode, levels have to be completed within a predefined time limit. Meanwhile, in Collect Mode, the player needs to collect special items before moving to the exit. Each of the game modes also feature Hard variations in which the player is limited in the number of times Joe can touch an obstacle before losing.

=== Magnetic Joe 1 & 2 (iPhone) ===
Magnetic Joe 1 & 2 for iOS is a port of the original Magnetic Joe which adds online leaderboards. Each level is timed, and users can submit their times to an online leaderboard to beat the predefined 'developer time' for each level. By improving their times, players are able to unlock new characters to play in the game. The game was removed from the App Store due to the demise of the publisher.
