= Castle of Magic =

2008 video game

- Developer: Gameloft
- Publisher: Gameloft
- Platforms: Java, iOS, Nintendo DSi, KaiOS
- Release: 2008–2009
- Genre: Platform

Castle of Magic is a platform game developed and published by Gameloft. It was released in 2008. It appeared on platforms including Java, iOS, Nintendo DSi and KaiOS.

== Plot ==
The heroes of this game — a boy and a girl, bored due to a broken video game, decide to do something else to pass their time. then, they end up reaching to a beach and they found the chest there. But they didn't expect the chest itself will open: it was magical. After that, our heroes find themselves in a magical world. There an evil wizard kidnaps his girlfriend, and the boy becomes a magician. The wizard follows him through all the worlds, then in the end to defeat him. When he disappears with the girl, the boy followed behind him. At last he had defeated the evil wizard Nefastax, but the game teased a new, greater threat for a subsequent adventure!

== Development ==
Castle of Magic began as a mobile game, created in September 2008. In 2009 an iPhone version was launched. All environments were reproduced using 3D graphics and control was based on on-screen touch controls. In November 2009, the company launched an adaptation of the game for the Nintendo DSi system, which is specially developed for a platform game. In 2018, the game was re-released for KaiOS devices.

== Reviews ==
↓ Castle of Magic Review — IGN:

http://www.ign.com/articles/2009/11/26/castle-of-magic-review

↓ E3: A Look at Gameloft's 'Castle of Magic' Side Scrolling Platformer | Touch Arcade:

http://toucharcade.com/2009/06/02/a-look-at-gamelofts-castle-of-magic-side-scrolling-platformer/

↓ Castle of Magic Review | Slide To Play:

http://www.slidetoplay.com/review/castle-of-magic-review/
