= Alt-Play: Jason Rohrer Anthology =

- Developer(s): Sabarasa Entertainment
- Publisher(s): Sabarasa Entertainment
- Platform(s): Nintendo DSi (DSiWare)
- Release: EU: December 31, 2010; NA: January 3, 2011
- Genre(s): Action-adventure
- Mode(s): Single-player

Alt-Play: Jason Rohrer Anthology is a video game compilation of the action-adventure games created by Jason Rohrer, developed and published by Sabarasa Entertainment for Nintendo DSi in 2010–2011. The game is a compilation of Rohrer's freeware PC games: Passage (2007), Gravitation, and Between (both released in 2008).

== Reception ==
Reception

Aggregate score
Aggregator	Score
Metacritic	47/100

Review scores
Publication	Score
Eurogamer	2/10
Nintendo Life	8/10 stars
Official Nintendo Magazine	54%
Pocket Gamer	4/5 stars
Metro	8/10

The game received "generally unfavorable reviews" according to the review aggregation website Metacritic. Although most critics gave it favorable reviews upon release, the only critic who gave it overwhelming dislike was Eurogamer, who said, "I'm all for artistic-minded developers that push the boundaries of convention and dare to try new things - I just want to be entertained along the way. Is that too much to ask?"
