= List of Nintendo franchises =

This is a list of video game franchises published by Nintendo. There have been multiple Nintendo-developed or Nintendo-published video games that have turned into series with two or more entries. Other franchises are jointly owned by Nintendo, which they continue to publish games in their respective series. This includes the Kirby series, owned by Nintendo and HAL Laboratory, and the Pokémon video game series, a franchise owned by Nintendo, Game Freak, and Creatures. Some franchises are associated with Nintendo, but are not always published as Nintendo franchises. Series such as Bayonetta are exclusive to Nintendo platforms through licensing agreements, with the intellectual property being owned by Sega. Other series such as Cruis'n, although owned by Nintendo, are often not published as Nintendo products, being associated more closely with Midway Games and Raw Thrills.

New franchises are often created at the beginning of a console's lifespan as experimental titles, with one of the most recent successful Nintendo series being Splatoon. When creating new video games at Nintendo, gameplay mechanics are conceptualized first, with a pre-established franchise chosen to best fit the desired game, otherwise creating a new franchise to suit the gameplay.

Some of Nintendo's franchises have sold over 100 million copies total, including The Legend of Zelda series, the Wii series, and the Pokémon series. With over 763 million copies sold as of 2025, their largest video game franchise is Mario. Nintendo has also created some of the longest-running video game franchises, with the first Game & Watch handheld system created in 1980, and Donkey Kong created in 1981.

== List of Nintendo video game franchises ==
Franchise	Description	Initial entry	Latest entry	Number of entries	Ref.
1080° Snowboarding	A series of snowboarding video games released for the Nintendo 64 and GameCube.	1998, 1080° Snowboarding	2003, 1080° Avalanche	2	
Animal Crossing	A series of social simulation games where the player creates a character and interacts anthropomorphic residents to customize their home and village.	2001, Animal Crossing	2020, Animal Crossing: New Horizons	5	
Another Code	A point-and-click adventure game series where players, as a teenage girl named Ashley Mizuki Robins, navigate through 3D environments to solve puzzles.	2005, Another Code: Two Memories	2024, Another Code: Recollection	3	
Art Academy	A series of edutainment games that provide training simulations aimed to teach players to draw.	2009, Art Academy	2016, Disney Art Academy	6	
Art Style	A successor to the bit Generations series released on DSiWare and WiiWare.	2006, Orbient	2010, Rotozoa	12	
Balloon Fight	A series of side-scrolling action games where the player maneuvers a floating character with two balloons strapped to their head through levels.	1985, VS. Balloon Fight	2007, Tingle's Balloon Fight	3	
Big Brain Academy	A series of puzzle video games that contain many minigames aimed to test, score, and improve a player's intellect.	2005, Big Brain Academy	2021, Big Brain Academy: Brain vs. Brain	3	
bit Generations	A series of seven simple Game Boy Advance games that focus on replay-ability that were released in two sets across 2006.	2006, Dotstream, Boundish, and Dialhex	2006, Coloris, Orbient, Digidrive and Soundvoyager	7	
BoxBoy!	A series of puzzle-platform games starring square-shaped characters who are able to create lines of adjacent boxes from their bodies to help navigate through short levels.	2015, BoxBoy!	2019, BoxBoy! + BoxGirl!	4	
Brain Age	Similar to Big Brain Academy, the series focuses on completing minigames designed to help improve one's mental processes.	2005, Brain Age: Train Your Brain in Minutes a Day!	2019, Dr Kawashima's Brain Training for Nintendo Switch	5	
Chibi-Robo!	A series of puzzle platformers where players maneuver a small robot through levels, ranging from a family's home to various outdoor environments.	2005, Chibi-Robo!	2015, Chibi-Robo! Zip Lash	5	
Clubhouse Games	A series of minigame collections, featuring a variety of simple card games, board games, and sport video games.	2005, Clubhouse Games	2020, Clubhouse Games: 51 Worldwide Classics		
Custom Robo	A series of action role-playing games where the player builds and customizes robots that are maneuvered and fought in enclosed arenas.	1999, Custom Robo	2006, Custom Robo Arena	5	
Daigasso! Band Brothers	A rhythm-based music video game series of two games, one Japan-only, and another only released in Japan and Europe.	2004, Daigasso! Band Brothers	2013, Daigassou! Band Brothers P	3	
Detective Pikachu	An adventure game sub-series of the Pokémon franchise focusing on the player solving mysteries with a gruff-talking Pikachu.	2016, Detective Pikachu	2023, Detective Pikachu Returns	2	
Dillon	A series of action-adventure/tower defense games where the player controls an armadillo who shoots guns to defeat enemies and defend towns from enemies.	2012, Dillon's Rolling Western	2018, Dillon's Dead-Heat Breakers	3	
Donkey Kong	A long-running series of video games involving Nintendo's Donkey Kong character.	1981, Donkey Kong	2025, Donkey Kong Bananza		
Donkey Kong Country	A sub-series of platformers in the Donkey Kong franchise, in which Donkey Kong and his friends fight against invading threats to their jungle home.	1994, Donkey Kong Country	2025, Donkey Kong Country Returns HD		
Donkey Konga	A sub-series of rhythm-based music video games in the Donkey Kong franchise that involve using bongo drums as a controller.	2003, Donkey Konga	2005, Donkey Konga 3	3	
Dr. Mario	A sub-series of falling block puzzle game in the Mario franchise.	1990, Dr. Mario	2019, Dr. Mario World	8	
EarthBound / Mother	A series of turn-based role-playing games known as Mother in of Japan and Earthbound outside of Japan.	1989, Mother	2006, Mother 3	3	
Elite Beat Agents / Ouendan	A series of rhythm-based music video games where the player helps encourage people through dancing in the vein of Japanese cheering squads.	2005, Osu! Tatakae! Ouendan	2007, Moero! Nekketsu Rhythm Damashii Osu! Tatakae! Ouendan 2	3	
Endless Ocean	A series of scuba diving simulation games.	2007, Endless Ocean	2024, Endless Ocean Luminous	3	
Excitebike	A series of motocross racing games. Initial entries involved motorbikes, while later entries expanded to various other four-wheel vehicles and animal-inspired robots.	1984, Excitebike	2009, Excitebike: World Rally	9	
Famicom Detective Club	A series of mystery visual novels where the player character solves murders as an assistant detective at the Utsugi Detective Agency.	1988, Famicom Tantei Club: Kieta Kōkeisha	2024, Emio – The Smiling Man: Famicom Detective Club	4	
Fire Emblem	A long-running series of tactical role-playing video games taking place in a medieval fantasy world.	1990, Fire Emblem: Shadow Dragon and the Blade of Light	2026, Fire Emblem: Fortune's Weave	18	
Fossil Fighters	A role playing video game series where the player unearths dinosaur fossils and revives them to do battle.	2008, Fossil Fighters	2014, Fossil Fighters: Frontier	3	
F-Zero	A series of futuristic racing games featuring high-speed hovercraft.	1990, F-Zero	2023, F-Zero 99	7	
Game & Watch	A series of simple minigames, originally released on dedicated handhelds, and later expanding into compiled into minigame compilations called Game & Watch Gallery.	1980, Game & Watch: Ball	2021, Game & Watch: The Legend of Zelda		
Golden Sun	A series of JRPGs following a group of magically-attuned people called "adepts" as they contend with the return of alchemy.	2001, Golden Sun	2010, Golden Sun: Dark Dawn	3	
Hotel Dusk	A point-and-click adventure game series starring a N.Y.P.D. detective-turned-salesman as he investigates mysteries around Los Angeles.	2007, Hotel Dusk: Room 215	2010, Last Window: The Secret of Cape West	2	
Ken Griffey Jr. Baseball	A series of Nintendo published baseball games focusing on baseball player Ken Griffey Jr.	1994, Ken Griffey Jr. Presents Major League Baseball	1999, Ken Griffey Jr.'s Slugfest	4	
Kid Icarus	A series of action video games set in a fictional Greco-Roman world, starring an angel named Pit as he accomplishes tasks for the goddess Palutena.	1986, Kid Icarus	2012, Kid Icarus: Uprising	3	
Kirby	A series of platformer games starring Kirby, with later entries spinning off into various other genre as well. Entries are generally simple in nature, developed more for beginners and people of all-ages.	1992, Kirby's Dream Land	2025, Kirby Air Riders	39	
Kururin	A series of maze navigation puzzle games starring Kururin, piloting a helicopter and completing levels to rescue his family.	2001, Kuru Kuru Kururin	2004, Kururin Squash!	3	
The Legendary Starfy	A series of platformers where the player controls a small star character, many releases relegated to Japan-only.	2002, Densetsu no Starfy	2008, The Legendary Starfy	5	
The Legend of Zelda	An action-adventure game series following different incarnations of a warrior and magical princess, Link and namesake of the series Princess Zelda, respectively, as they defend Hyrule and other lands from evil, usual at the hands of the vile Ganon.	1986, The Legend of Zelda	2024, The Legend of Zelda: Echoes of Wisdom	20	
Luigi's Mansion	A sub-series of action-adventure games in the Mario franchise starring Mario's brother, Luigi, as he explores haunted locales.	2001, Luigi's Mansion	2019, Luigi's Mansion 3	3	
Mario Baseball	A sub-series of the Mario franchise involving characters from the series competing in baseball games.	2005, Mario Superstar Baseball	2008, Mario Super Sluggers	2	
Mario Golf	A sub-series of the Mario franchise involving characters from the series competing in golf.	1999, Mario Golf	2021, Mario Golf: Super Rush	6	
Mario Kart	A sub-series of the Mario franchise involving characters from the series racing in go karts.	1992, Super Mario Kart	2025, Mario Kart World	11	
Mario Party	A sub-series of the Mario franchise involving characters from the series competing in board games and minigames.	1998, Mario Party	2024, Super Mario Party Jamboree	13	
Mario Strikers	A sub-series of the Mario franchise involving characters from the series competing in a contact sport variant of soccer.	2005, Super Mario Strikers	2022, Mario Strikers: Battle League	3	
Mario Tennis	A sub-series of the Mario franchise involving characters from the series competing in tennis.	1995, Mario's Tennis	2026, Mario Tennis Fever	9	
Mario vs. Donkey Kong	A series of puzzle platformers where Mario, or toy versions thereof, is maneuvered through small levels.	2004, Mario vs. Donkey Kong	2024, Mario vs. Donkey Kong (remake)		
Mario & Luigi	A series of turn-based role-playing video games where both Mario and Luigi are concurrently controlled by the player.	2003, Mario & Luigi: Superstar Saga	2024, Mario & Luigi: Brothership		
Mario & Sonic at the Olympic Games	A crossover between the Mario and Sonic the Hedgehog series where characters from each compete in minigames themed around the Olympic Games.	2007, Mario & Sonic at the Olympic Games	2019, Mario & Sonic at the Olympic Games Tokyo 2020	4	
Metroid	A series of platform adventure games featuring Samus Aran, a bounty hunter who is frequently hired to subdue intergalactic threats.	1986, Metroid	2021, Metroid Dread		
Metroid Prime	A sub-series of the Metroid franchise where its core gameplay is adapted to 3D space from a first person perspective.	2002, Metroid Prime	2025, Metroid Prime 4: Beyond		
NES Remix	A series of video games that take small excerpts of NES games and rework them into smaller minigames and new challenges.	2013, NES Remix	2014, Ultimate NES Remix		
Nintendogs	A series of real-time pet simulation video games where players interact and train dogs, and in later entries, cats.	2005, Nintendogs	2011, Nintendogs + Cats	2	
Paper Mario	A sub-series of the Mario franchise where characters are flat like a sheet of paper in 3D space. Varying levels of role-playing video game elements are present across entries.	2000, Paper Mario	2024, Paper Mario: The Thousand-Year Door (remake)	6	
Picross	A series of puzzle video games involving solving nonogram puzzles, many being crossovers with various media franchises, including those owned by Nintendo. Later entries would be self-published by developer Jupiter Corporation.	1995, Mario's Picross	2026, Picross S: Konami Antiques Edition	53	
Pikmin	A series of real-time strategy games where the player explores an Earth-like planet with aid of the titular plant-like creatures, collecting items and fighting various fauna.	2001, Pikmin	2023, Pikmin 4	4	
Pilotwings	A series of flight simulation video games, often with characters using jet packs or hang gliders.	1990, Pilotwings	2011, Pilotwings Resort	3	
Pokémon	A long-running role-playing video game series involving the collection, fighting, and trading of creatures called "Pokémon".	1996, Pokémon Red and Blue	2025, Pokémon Legends: Z-A		
Pokémon Mystery Dungeon	A roguelike sub-series of the Pokémon franchise, wherein the player takes the role of a Pokémon and navigates through dungeons.	2005, Pokémon Mystery Dungeon: Rescue Team	2020, Pokémon Mystery Dungeon: Rescue Team DX	6	
Pokémon Ranger	A sub-series of the Pokémon franchise with a different "catching" mechanic from the mainline series and a mission-based plot.	2006, Pokémon Ranger	2010, Pokémon Ranger: Guardian Signs	3	
Pokémon Rumble	A sub-series of the Pokémon franchise in which the player controls a Pokémon and fights other Pokémon in beat 'em up-styled gameplay.	2009, Pokémon Rumble	2019, Pokémon Rumble Rush	5	
Pokémon Snap	A photography video game sub-series of the Pokémon franchise, in which the player takes pictures of Pokémon in on-rails levels.	1999, Pokémon Snap	2021, New Pokémon Snap	2	
Pokémon Stadium	A sub-series of the Pokémon franchise focused on the battling of Pokémon, with gameplay connectivity to the mainline series of games.	1998, Pocket Monsters Stadium	2000, Pokémon Stadium 2	2	
Pokémon Trading Card Game	A video game adaption of the Pokémon Trading Card Game.	1998, Pokémon Trading Card Game	2024, Pokémon Trading Card Game Pocket	2	
Punch-Out!!	A series of single-player boxing video games with a focus on pattern recognition, where the player assumes the role of a young Bronxite who aims to become champion of the World Video Boxing Association.	1984, Punch-Out!!	2009, Doc Louis's Punch-Out!!	5	
Pushmo	A series of puzzle platformer games where the player must navigate giant block structures to rescue the children trapped within.	2011, Pushmo	2015, Stretchmo	4	
Puzzle League / Panel de Pon	A series of tile-matching puzzle video games.	1995, Tetris Attack	2007, Planet Puzzle League	6	
Rhythm Heaven	A series of rhythm-based music video games produced by musician Tsunku♂.	2006, Rhythm Tengoku	2026, Rhythm Heaven Groove	5	
Sin and Punishment	A series of rail shooter games set in a dystopian world.	2000, Sin and Punishment	2009, Sin & Punishment: Star Successor	2	
Splatoon	A series of third-person shooters focused around teenagers using colorful paintball gun-like weapons in turf wars, with a large focus on online multiplayer gameplay.	2015, Splatoon	2026, Splatoon Raiders	4	
Star Fox	A long-running series of rail shooter games starring the titular group of mercenaries led by Fox McCloud.	1993, Star Fox	2026, Star Fox	8	
StarTropics	A series of action-adventure games starring a teenager from Seattle as he helps his archaeologist uncle defend a group of alien refugees from the warlord chasing them.	1990, StarTropics	1994, Zoda's Revenge: StarTropics II	2	
Steel Diver	A submarine simulation game where the player is part of a secret military force created to combat a hostile nation that has invaded its neighboring countries.	2011, Steel Diver	2014, Steel Diver: Sub Wars	2	
Style Savvy	A fashion simulation video game where players manage their own clothing stores, dress up their avatars and compete in contests.	2008, Style Savvy	2017, Style Savvy: Styling Star	4	
Super Mario	A long-running series of platformers starring Nintendo's mascot Mario and a variety of other characters from the series.	1985, Super Mario Bros.	2023, Super Mario Bros. Wonder		
Super Mario Maker	A sub-series of the Super Mario series focusing on the creation, sharing, and playing of user-created 2D platformer levels.	2015, Super Mario Maker	2019, Super Mario Maker 2	2	
Super Smash Bros.	A platform fighting game series that crosses over a variety of Nintendo franchises, with third party characters from other companies added in later entries.	1999, Super Smash Bros.	2018, Super Smash Bros. Ultimate	6	
Tingle	A sub-series of The Legend of Zelda series that focuses on the quirky character Tingle, a grown man who believes he is a fairy.	2006, Freshly-Picked Tingle's Rosy Rupeeland	2009, Dekisugi Tingle Pack		
Tomodachi Life	A series of social simulation games involving Nintendo's Mii character avatars, where the player creates a community of Miis and watches them interact with each other, form relationships, and partake in various scenarios.	2009, Tomodachi Collection	2026, Tomodachi Life: Living the Dream	3	
Wario	A sub-series of the Mario franchise revolving around the character Wario, with its mainline entries generally playing as a platformer.	1994, Wario Land: Super Mario Land 3	2008, Wario Land: Shake It!	6	
WarioWare	A sub-series of the Wario sub-series of the Mario franchise involving playing extremely quick and short minigames referred to as "microgames".	2003, WarioWare, Inc.: Mega Microgames!	2023, WarioWare: Move It!	12	
Wars	A long-running series of military-themed turn-based strategy games.	1988, Famicom Wars	2023, Advance Wars 1+2: Re-Boot Camp	13	
Wave Race	A series of racing video games focused on driving personal watercraft.	1992, Wave Race	2001, Wave Race: Blue Storm	3	
Wii	A series of minigame compilations focused around motion controls, including the Wii Sports, Wii Fit, Wii Play, and Wii Party sub-series.	2006, Wii Sports	2022, Nintendo Switch Sports		
Wii Fit	A sub-series of the Wii video game series that focuses on tracking physical fitness through use of the Wii Balance Board.	2007, Wii Fit	2013, Wii Fit U	2	
Wii Party	A sub-series of the Wii video game series that focuses on board games and minigames similar to the Mario Party series.	2010, Wii Party	2013, Wii Party U	2	
Wii Sports	A sub-series of the Wii video game series that focuses on a collection of sports video games.	2006, Wii Sports	2022, Nintendo Switch Sports	5	
Xenoblade	A series of action role-playing games that serve as a continuation of the larger Xeno metaseries, with a focus on open world exploration.	2010, Xenoblade Chronicles	2025, Xenoblade Chronicles X: Definitive Edition	4	
Yoshi	A sub-series of the Mario franchise involving platformers with Yoshi as the primary playable character. Other entries in the series include puzzle games themed around Yoshi.	1991, Yoshi	2026, Yoshi and the Mysterious Book		

== See also ==
- List of video game franchises
- List of Sega video game franchises
