= Snowpack Park =

2010 video game

- Developer: Skip Ltd.
- Publisher: Nintendo
- Producers: Hiroshi Suzuki; Satoru Iwata
- Designer: Takamitsu Hagiwara
- Programmers: Hironori Ahiko; Junko Muroyama
- Artist: Yasuyo Oki
- Composer: Hirofumi Taniguchi
- Platform: WiiWare
- Release: NA: November 22, 2010; JP: December 21, 2010
- Genre: Life simulation
- Modes: Single-player, multiplayer

Snowpack Park, known in Japan as Penguin Seikatsu (ペンギン生活; lit. "Penguin Life"), is a 2010 life simulation video game developed by Skip Ltd. and published by Nintendo for the Wii's WiiWare digital distribution service.

== Gameplay ==
The player's Mii interacting with penguins, raising their total friendship points.

Snowpack Park is a slow-paced life simulation game controlled using the Wii Remote and Nunchuk, which can be played with either one or two players. Players take control over either a Mii character or one of the characters already prepared. The game revolves around gathering penguins and interacting with them by feeding, petting, and playing different minigames with them. players brave various terrain and unexpected obstacles as they travel from island to island, finding penguins and bringing them back safely to the park. But getting them back is just the beginning. The penguins have different moods, which go up and down depending on how much interaction they have with the player, and if a penguin's mood gets too bad, it will leave the park. To prevent that from happening, players must learn how to feed, pet, and play games with the penguins in order to keep them happy.

At the end of the day, players receive friendship points depending on their interactions with the penguins. These points can be used to buy balloons, which help them travel to new islands where they can gather more penguins. Players can also find new items and items, accessories, and headwear they can equip their penguins with. They can also fish at special locations, where they can catch tuna, blowfish, and even more items. There are various minigames players can play around the park, such as Free-Throw Follies, Blowfish Bowling, and Chuck-a-Chowfish. There are also several minigames they can unlock by tracking down keys to igloos located throughout the park. The penguins play an important role in the minigames. An example of this is the basketball minigame, where players throw penguins instead of basketballs.

== Plot ==
The player arrives at Snowpack Park hoping to hang out with some of the local penguins and learn how to take care of them. However, a snowstorm hits the park, sending the resident penguins of the park fleeing to various islands throughout the area. With only three penguins remaining, the player sets out to gather all of the penguins from the various islands and bring them back to the Snowpack Park. They are accompanied by Sam the penguin, who teaches them everything they need to know about caring for the penguins. Once the player collects 100 total penguins, Sam the penguin desires to be appreciated just as much as the penguins are by the player.

== Development and release ==
This was the last Wii title fully developed by Skip Ltd. Fumihiro Kanaya, programmer of the bit Generations series, designed the character of Sam the penguin. Snowpack Park released on November 22, 2010 in North America and on December 21, 2010 in Japan. In North America, it had no prior buildup to its release, while in Japan, it was announced a few days prior to its release on December 17, 2010. It is one of the few WiiWare games to be localized in the United States, but not in Europe. Many employees at Skip Ltd. who worked on Snowpack Park would be later develop some of the minigames included in Wii Play: Motion. Keita Eto, who created the basic concept of the gameplay, would go on to direct Skip's minigames in Wii Play: Motion.

== Reception ==
Snowpack Park received mixed reviews after its launch. Reviewers criticized the game for being too aimless and shallow, but praised it for having a calm and relaxing mood. Nintendo Life gave the game a 6/10 score; they noted that the game suffered from its lack of direction and sluggish pacing, but noted that it is an enjoyable and calm experience. Jonathan Metts of Nintendo World Report described the game as "weirdly charming" and a fun experience. He claimed that Snowpack Park shared some gameplay elements with the Chibi-Robo! series, but would likely recommend other works by Skip Ltd. before recommending Snowpack Park. Nintendojo writer Kevin Knezevic summarized it as "the wintry lovechild of Pikmin and Animal Crossing", and assumes that very few people have played the game. David M. writing for Nintendo Power recommended the title, recognizing it as an enjoyable experience, particularly for a younger age demographic. Chris Kohler writing for Kotaku considered it on the same level of quality as MaBoShi: The Three Shape Arcade, My Pokémon Ranch, and Pokémon Rumble, but not as good as the Art Style games developed by Skip. When playing its re-release through Club Nintendo, Lucas M. Thomas of IGN described it as a "milder, more casual version of Pikmin", but was likely worth the coins spent. In a retrospective look on the Wii Shop Channel, CJ Andriessen of Destructoid claimed Snowpack Park and Bonsai Barber were great examples of "diverse and eclectic games".

In Japan, it briefly held the top position as the best-selling WiiWare game. It remained as the second best-selling WiiWare game on the storefront's popularity charts for a month.
