= Pictobits =

2009 video game

- Developer: Skip Ltd.
- Publisher: Nintendo
- Composer: YMCK
- Series: Art Style
- Platforms: DSiWare
- Release: JP: January 28, 2009; NA: May 18, 2009; PAL: May 22, 2009
- Genre: Puzzle
- Mode: Single-player

Pictobits, known as Picopict in Europe and Pictopict in Australia, is a puzzle video game developed by Skip Ltd. and published by Nintendo for the Nintendo DSi's DSiWare digital distribution service. It is one of seven games released for the DSi's Art Style series of video games. It was announced on January 26, 2009, was released two days later alongside Somnium, another Art Style game, and was released in North America and PAL regions in the same year, on May 18 and May 22 respectively. In Pictobits, players use the touchscreen to move coloured blocks into a formation, such as a four-block line or a 2x2 square. This contributes to an 8-bit image, which consist of various Nintendo Entertainment System (NES) characters, such as Mario, Link, and Bowser.

Pictobits was an anticipated release due to its presentation. Since its release, Pictobits has received a very positive reception from publications such as IGN, GameSpy, and writer Stephen Totilo. It was nominated for best DS puzzle game of the year from IGN and won best DSiWare game of the year from Nintendo Life. It had critics, including Pocket Gamer and GameSpot, the latter finding it too difficult and imprecise. A fellow developer of downloadable video games, Gaijin Games, praised it for its gameplay and presentation. It received some attention in sales, appearing on the DSiWare's top 20 best-selling games chart for several weeks following its release, peaking at 10. It has been compared to Tetris by several people, though UGO's Paul Furfari bemoaned such a comparison, saying that its presentation set it apart.

== Gameplay ==
Gameplay showing an unfinished 8-bit sprite of Mario

The objective of Pictobits is to move coloured blocks from the bottom of the touchscreen under falling blocks of corresponding colors. If a shape is made using the added block, the blocks add to an image on the top screen. For example, if players form a red block sequence, the image will gain as many red blocks as has been cleared, assuming that any blocks of that colour remain to be added. If blocks fall as a result of clearing blocks that were attached to it, they are added to the blocks at the bottom and can be used, though a special variety of block exists that cannot be picked up, forcing players to either clear them before they land or wait for the right blocks to fall on them. As players clear more blocks, they will eventually form an image. These images are of 8-bit renditions of characters from NES games, such as Mario, Link, and Bowser.

Players' performances are judged on two qualities - their score and their time taken to complete a level. A high score is often achieved by comboing clears, a task accomplished by either clearing blocks before a clear from before has finished, or having blocks fall and form a clear as a result of a previous clear. On the side of the touchscreen is an item called a "POW Block", which players may use to clear the bottom two lines and drop all midair blocks, but sacrifices a reserve space with each use. Coins earned in the stage can be used to regain the lost reserve spaces. There is a more difficult version of each stage called "Ura", "Dark" or "Remix". These stages are locked initially, and can only become playable by using coins, which are achieved by clearing certain kinds of blocks. These coins can also be used to purchase songs that appear in the in-game store; the initial purchase includes only the original version of the song, while the remixed version can be purchased for an increased price. These songs can also be listened to while the Nintendo DSi is closed.

== Development and release ==
Pictobits was developed by Skip Ltd. and published by Nintendo for the Nintendo DSi's DSiWare service. It was revealed in a display of DSiWare titles by Satoru Iwata on January 26, 2009, alongside Decode, Aquario, and Somnium (known as Code, Aquite, and Nemrem in PAL regions, Base 10, Aquia, and Zengage in North America). Both it and Somnium were released two days later in Japan. The North American release came on May 18, 2009. It was later released in PAL regions on May 22, 2009. While the European release of Picopict retained the Japanese name, the Australian and North American releases changed the name to Pictobits and Pictopict respectively.

== Reception ==
Reception

Aggregate scores
Aggregator	Score
GameRankings	83.64% (based on 11 reviews)
Metacritic	83/100 (based on nine reviews)

Review scores
Publication	Score
GameSpot	6.5/10
IGN	8.5/10
Nintendo World Report	9/10
Official Nintendo Magazine	9.1/10
PALGN	8.5/10

Pictobits has received a positive reception. It holds an aggregate score of 83/100 and 84.64% from Metacritic and GameRankings respectively. This made it the 37th best Nintendo DS game and the 1,201st best video game on GameRankings. For the weeks ending June 10 and June 17, Pictobits was the 10th best-selling DSiWare game. It was the 15th best-selling DSiWare game for the week ending June 24, and 18th for the week ending July 2. It ranked 20th the next week, falling off the charts the week afterward. Nintendo Life's Brody Olimar called Pictobits one of the first great title on the DSiWare service, commenting that it was a good value and had nothing to complain about. Nintendo Life also named it the best Nintendo DSiWare game of the year. Giant Bomb's Brad Shoemaker commented that it looked like the "best thing on DSiWare". In his review, Shoemaker called it a "tough, rewarding puzzle game that will take you a while to master, and even longer to unlock all the available content".

N-Sider's Matt Behrens called it one of the best Art Style games, along with Cubello. He added that if they make more DSiWare like it, he would recommend the DSi to more people. Nintendo World Report's Nick DiMola called it one of the DSiWare and Art Style games, calling it a "fun but challenging" game. Developer of the Bit.Trip series, Gaijin Games, praised it for its music and its "simple yet intuitive" gameplay. Though they criticized it for its touch controls and its difficulty level, they add that players become more skilled as the game goes on, making the latter not much of a problem. Official Nintendo Magazine's Chris Scullion praised it for its retro graphics and music, as well as calling it "fiendishly addictive" and a "great value". However, they noted it as a "very difficult" game.

In his impressions of Pictobits, IGN's Craig Harris called it "one of the most ambitious "match three" style puzzle games I've ever played". Harris later reviewed it, calling it "unique, clever, fast-paced, and highly addictive". IGN awarded it as the Game of the Month for the Nintendo DS in May 2009, commenting that players will "have a hard time putting this unique puzzle game down". They also nominated for best Nintendo DS puzzle game of 2009 for both their award and the readers' choice award. They ranked it as the fifth best DSiWare game as of April 7, 2010. Stephen Totilo gave it overwhelming praise, citing specifically its challenge, old-school presentation, and the abundance of content; he adds that he could not come up with any cons, wishing that they would make a 16-bit sequel. In a later article, he praised the composers YMCK, who he forgot to mention in his review. He suggested that Picopict had the best video game soundtrack of 2009 up to that point. He later called it one of his favourite games of the first half of 2009. In an article on fine art, Totilo discussed designers' urge to create games with realistic appearances, praising Pictobits as a "rare modern game with retro graphics". Kotaku's Brian Ashcraft listed it on his "DS and DSi gift guide", calling it a game with a "Tetris twist" and an "artsy retro style". He also praised it as one of the best values for the DSiWare, recommending it for anyone who gets nostalgic for the Nintendo Entertainment System.

UGO Networks' Paul Furfari called it "pure retro love packaged in a clever puzzler", commenting that comparing it to Tetris is a "disservice" due to it putting "enough twist on the falling block formula to provide a stylish and full experience" as well as the inclusion of an NES theme and YMCK-made retro music. In another article, he included it in his list of 25 video games that went overlooked in 2009, commenting that its chiptunes give it a "ton of character". Game, Set, Watch's Eric Caoli commented that it was "criminal" that Picopict did not end up on many game of the year lists in 2009. In discussing the Art Style series, GamePro's Dave Rudden commented that it was one of the series' games that seemed like a "potential classic". GamePro called it a "great downloadable hit" for the DSiWare. GameSpy's Brian Altano called it "highly recommended". PALGN's Adam Ghiggino called it "totally awesome", calling its gameplay "addictive and unique". 1UP.com's Steve Watts recommended Pictobits for Nintendo fans. In spite of all the positive reception, Pocket Gamer's Jon Jordan commented that it wasn't the "most welcoming or spectacular game in the DSi Shop" due to its "plonky music" and "8-bit inspiration". Eurogamer's Tom Bramwell, in his impressions of Picopict, commented on the presentation, calling the visuals "warm" and the soundtrack "immersive". Similarly, GameSpot's Tom Mc Shea found fault in the title; while he enjoyed the Nintendo cameos and the concept behind the game, he found the controls imprecise and the difficulty too high.
