= Rotohex =

2006 video game

- WiiWare image for Rotohex
- Developer: Skip Ltd.
- Publisher: Nintendo
- Series: Art Style
- Platforms: Game Boy Advance; WiiWare
- Release: Game Boy Advance: JP: July 13, 2006; WiiWare: NA: October 27, 2008; PAL: December 5, 2008; JP: May 12, 2009
- Genre: Puzzle
- Modes: Single-player, multiplayer

Rotohex (Released in Japan as Dialhex) is a puzzle video game developed by Skip Ltd. and published by Nintendo for the Wii's WiiWare service. It is a remake of the Japan-only bit Generations title Dialhex. It was released as WiiWare in North America on October 27, 2008.

== Gameplay ==
The objective of the game is for the player to form hexagons of a solid color (called a "Hex") by rotating into place and combining together colored triangles which drop down from the top of the screen. The player is required to create a certain number of Hexes in order to pass each stage. Initially the game starts with triangles encompassing only two colors, with more colors eventually being added to the mix. In addition, glowing triangles give the player power-ups such as creating a hole in the bottom of the play area, or swapping colors. There are eight different colors in total.

Along with a solo mode which involves progressing through levels, the game features unlockable endless play and sprint modes along with competitive and co-operative multiplayer.

== Development ==
Rotohex was originally released for the Game Boy Advance as Dialhex under the Bit Generations label on July 13, 2006 exclusively in Japan. This version was announced on June 1, 2006. Nintendo announced that they would be giving free copies of the games in the series to 700 members of the Club Nintendo website in exchange to feedback on them, though only to people who own a Game Boy Advance or Nintendo DS. Nintendo filed for an ESRB rating for this title in the US. It was later remade for the Wii's WiiWare service in the Art Style series. Both versions were developed and published by Skip Ltd. and Nintendo respectively.

== Reception ==
Reception

Aggregate scores
Aggregator	Score
GameRankings	71.00%
Metacritic	70/100

Review scores
Publication	Score
Eurogamer	7/10
GameSpot	5.5/10
IGN	8/10
Nintendo Life	8/10
Nintendo World Report	7/10

Rotohex received mixed reviews from critics upon release. On Metacritic, the game holds a score of 70/100 based on 7 reviews, indicating "mixed or average reviews". On GameRankings, the game holds a score of 71.00% based on 7 reviews.

IGN gave Rotohex an 8/10, calling the game "one of those awesome 'zone out' matching puzzlers" which carries an "unbelievable addictiveness" in its gameplay that is "almost as addictive as Marathon Mode is in Tetris". It was nominated for Best Puzzle Game for the Wii by IGN in its 2008 video game awards.
