= Zengage =

2009 video game

- Developer: Skip Ltd.
- Publisher: Nintendo
- Series: Art Style
- Platform: Nintendo DSi
- Release: JP: January 30, 2009; PAL: May 29, 2009; NA: July 20, 2009
- Genre: Puzzle
- Mode: Single-player

Zengage, known as Nemrem in PAL territories and Somnium in Japan, is a puzzle video game developed by Skip Ltd. and published by Nintendo for the Nintendo DSi's DSiWare digital distribution service. It is one of multiple entries in the Art Style series of games. It first released in Japan in January 2009, and was later released in PAL regions and North America in May and July 2009 respectively. In Zengage, players are given increasingly difficult slide puzzles that require them to slide tiles to match the position of colored balls with colored tiles.

Over time, new gimmicks are added to up the difficulty. Zengage received generally mixed reception, criticized by critics for a high level of difficulty and for having a "boring" art style. IGN writer Craig Harris, who does not enjoy slide puzzles himself, suggested that people who do would like this game.

== Gameplay ==
Zengage requires players to slide colored tiles on a game board in order to match the positions of colored balls resting on the same board. The colored titles are moved through vertical and horizontal movements on the touchscreen. As the game progresses, puzzles gain new mechanics that make it more difficult to solve the puzzle. These include preventing certain tiles from being moved. The later levels also add additional colors that need to be matched.

== Development ==
Zengage was announced for the DSiWare service on January 28, 2009, and released two days later alongside Pictobits, another title in the Art Style series. It was later released in PAL regions on May 29, 2009 and in North America on July 20, 2009.

== Reception ==
Reception

Aggregate score
Aggregator	Score
Metacritic	65/100

Review scores
Publication	Score
IGN	6.5/10
Nintendo Life	8/10
Pocket Gamer	5/10

Zengage received mixed reviews from critics upon release. On Metacritic, the game holds a score of 65/100 based on 5 reviews, indicating "mixed or average reviews". JC Fletcher of Joystiq felt that being released alongside Pictobits caused it to be overlooked when it was released in Japan. In their group review of DSiWare games, GameSpy writers Brian Altano and Brian Miggels gave it a rating of 'worthless', suggesting that the name Zengage feels "pompous" due to it lacking engaging gameplay. They also criticized it for not having a memorable style or "Zen-like qualities". They suggested that it was boring and a waste of money. Jon Jordan of Pocket Gamer felt it was "nothing to get excited about", and that a person's enjoyment of the game is more about whether they like cerebral puzzles or not. They also praised the presentation as "pleasant" despite also being "fairly muted".

Craig Harris of IGN praised it for enhancing the concept of slide puzzles, a genre which he criticized for being over-saturated on DSiWare due to the ease of making them. He also noted it as one of the most challenging DSiWare games, praising its soundtrack as "brilliantly relaxing" and commented that the relaxing music was meant to keep players caLm during the game's most difficult puzzles. He did not enjoy it much, but felt that people who like difficult games would. On the other hand, Neil Ronaghan of Nintendo World Report praised it for its depth, calling its aesthetic "cool and somewhat creepy".
