= Precipice (video game) =

2009 video game

- Developer: Skip Ltd.
- Publisher: Nintendo
- Series: Art Style
- Platforms: DSiWare
- Release: JP: February 25, 2009; PAL: June 5, 2009; NA: August 3, 2009
- Genre: Puzzle
- Mode: Single-player

Precipice, released as Kubos in PAL territories and Nalaku in Japan, is a puzzle video game developed by Skip Ltd. and published by Nintendo for the Nintendo DSi's DSiWare digital distribution service. It was released as part of the Art Style series.

== Gameplay ==
Players must change the colors of cubes by controlling a character who walks on and climbs them, gradually scaling the rising tower of cubes. As cubes fall from the sky, the player must also avoid these, and avoid stepping on cubes when they are shaking. Cubes can be climbed on to the next level and even pushed around in order to get rows and columns of cubes touched on the same level to score points. Flashing bomb cubes can be defused by the character to give them a mega punch that knocks cubes off the tower on the same level as the character in the direction of the punch. If a bomb cube is not defused in time, a 3-by-3 area of cubes is destroyed. The character slowly runs out of energy, displayed as a meter on the left of the game screen, and without any energy they are forced to stop and take a breath roughly every two moves. If the character stands on a multi-color energy cube, their energy is replenished by as much as half. To get better viewing angles, the player can rotate the tower 90 degrees in either direction, or look at the tower from above, to let the player see where the character is going and if any cubes will fall onto that area of the tower. The game is over if the character is squashed from a falling block, and as a result runs out of energy, or if they stand on a cube that falls or is destroyed, and thus fall off the tower.

Kubos has two gameplay modes. The "Ten Floors" mode has a tower that is 5-by-5 cubes in width and depth, and is cleared when the character climbs up ten floors. A player's score only counts when the ten floors are cleared. The "Tower" mode instead has a 3-by-3 size tower, and cubes continue to fall down endlessly. If the character stands on all of the cubes on the same floor, their energy level is fully restored. More cubes continue to fall until the character climbs up ten floors, at which point the cubes ease off for a while. Also included in the game is an additional "Relax" mode, which allows the player to rewatch animations they have unlocked by having increasing numbers of rows and columns touched at once in the "Ten Floors" mode.

== Development ==
Precipice was released on February 25, 2009 in Japan, the PAL regions on June 5, 2009 and in North America on August 3, 2009. It was developed by Skip Ltd. and published by Nintendo for the DSiWare service.

== Reception ==
Reception

Review scores
Publication	Score
Nintendo Life	8/10
Pocket Gamer	6/10

Precipice was nominated for Game of the Year by Nintendo Power, as well as DSiWare Game of the Year and Best Puzzle Game. Darren Calvert of Nintendo Life gave the game a 8/10 score, praising the game for its addictive and challenging gameplay and noting it to be one of the better DSiWare games.
