= Boxlife =

2009 video game

- Developer: Skip Ltd.
- Publisher: Nintendo
- Series: Art Style
- Platform: Nintendo DSi
- Release: JP: February 25, 2009; NA: June 22, 2009; PAL: July 10, 2009
- Genre: Puzzle
- Mode: Single-player

Boxlife, known as Hacolife in Japan, is a 2009 puzzle video game developed by Skip Ltd. and published by Nintendo for the Nintendo DSi's DSiWare digital distribution service. It was released as part of the Art Style series.

== Gameplay ==
The game is set in a factory, where the player is a worker who must cut six squares out of a sheet of paper in various patterns to form cubes (or boxes) which, once folded properly, are lifted away from the playing field. The stylus is used to choose between three options to perform this task: Scissors, to cut the paper; Fold, which enables the player to assemble a cut pattern into a box; and Reattach, to erase cuts made in error.

There are two modes of play: R&D Mode and Factory Mode. In both, the objective of the game is the same—to form boxes until the timer runs out—and the player is penalized for any stray squares left over on the playing field afterward.

=== R&D Mode ===
In this mode, different patterns to form cubes are introduced to the player. The player is given sheets of paper squares to work with, and must come up with the correct patterns to cut out of their paper sheets in order to clear the floor entirely before the timer runs out. R&D Mode allows the player character to rise in rank and earn promotions and new outfits or uniforms to wear.

=== Factory Mode ===
In this mode, the player is given a time limit and an endless sheet of paper to cut into boxes that may be scrolled down from the top of the screen as it is used up. Periodically, bombs will fall onto the playing field, and the player may form a box around the bomb to earn a bonus, but if the bomb is allowed to explode, it will burn away adjacent squares of paper. The player is penalized for stray squares left behind and/or any paper that falls off of the screen as it is scrolled downward. Factory Mode allows the player character to earn money, and upon reaching certain amounts the character gains new items for its miniature garden on the top screen.

== Development ==
Hacolife was originally released on February 25, 2009 in Japan. As Boxlife, it was released in North America on June 22, 2009 and in Europe on July 10, 2009. It was developed by Skip Ltd. and published by Nintendo for the DSiWare service.

== Reception ==
Reception

Aggregate scores
Aggregator	Score
GameRankings	80.25%
Metacritic	80/100

Review scores
Publication	Score
GameSpot	7.5/10
IGN	7.8/10
Nintendo Life	8/10
Nintendo World Report	8/10

Boxlife has received generally favorable reviews, with an average score of 80.25% on GameRankings and 80/100 on Metacritic. Reviewers praised the unique presentation and gameplay, as well as the retro music and graphics, but criticized the sometimes iffy controls and steep difficulty.
