= Cubello =

2008 video game

- WiiWare image
- Developer: Skip Ltd.
- Publisher: Nintendo
- Series: Art Style
- Platform: WiiWare
- Release: NA: October 13, 2008; PAL: November 21, 2008; JP: May 12, 2009
- Genre: Puzzle
- Mode: Single-player

Cubello, known in Japan as Cubeleo, was released in North America for WiiWare on October 13, 2008. While it was the third series release (after both Orbient and Rotohex, respectively), Cubello was the first fully original Art Style series entry, having no bit Generations series counterpart.

== Gameplay ==
In Cubello, using the pointer function of the Wii Remote, players aim and launch colored cubes at a three-dimensional object called a Cubello. A Cubello consists of many colored cubes that float and rotate in empty space. The objective of the game is to strip the Cubello of cubes by matching four or more of the same color to reveal the Cubello's inner core.

The player is initially given only a limited number of cubes in a "magazine" to complete the objective in each stage. However, more cubes are added to the magazine for the player, the more cubes they take away from the Cubello. Unlike many other games, such as Puzzle Bobble, where the goal is to eliminate objects of certain colors or shapes, Cubello continues to provide the player with cube colors that are either still in the magazine or on the stage, so the player has to calculate to have the color disappear from the magazine and the stage at the same time to win. There is also a "Bonus Time" on the slot machine device that gives the player unlimited cubes to shoot of one color, or "Super Bonus Time," which gives cubes of different colors depending on where they are launched.

Players also lose cubes in the magazine if the Cubello bumps into the screen in front of them.

The game also features an endless play mode in which players progress through increasingly difficult stages.

== Development ==
Cubello was released in North America on October 13, 2008, in PAL regions on November 21, 2008 and in Japan on May 12, 2009.

== Reception ==
Reception

Aggregate score
Aggregator	Score
Metacritic	73/100

Review scores
Publication	Score
Eurogamer	7/10
GameSpot	7/10
IGN	7.7/10
Nintendo Life	8/10
Nintendo World Report	6/10

Cubello received mixed to positive reviews from critics upon release. On Metacritic, the game holds a score of 73/100 based on 11 reviews, indicating "mixed or average reviews".

Scoring it a 7.7/10, IGN said Cubello had an "entertaining core concept" done with "simplicity and polish" and with a "really, really rewarding" gameplay mechanic that needed some balancing.
