= Chibi-Robo!: Park Patrol =

2007 video game

- North American box art
- Developer: Skip Ltd.
- Publisher: Nintendo
- Director: Hiroshi Moriyama
- Producers: Kensuke Tanabe; Hiroshi Suzuki
- Designer: Fumikazu Tanaka
- Programmers: Masahiko Kikuchi; Tsukasa Namba
- Composer: Eishin Kawakami
- Series: Chibi-Robo!
- Platform: Nintendo DS
- Release: JP: July 5, 2007; NA: October 2, 2007; AU: March 20, 2008
- Genres: Platform, adventure
- Mode: Single-player

Chibi-Robo! Park Patrol (Note: Known in Japan as Sakasete! Chibi-Robo! (咲かせて!ちびロボ!; "Make It Bloom! Little-Robo!")) is a platform-adventure video game for the Nintendo DS. Developed by Skip Ltd. and published by Nintendo, it is the second installment in the Chibi-Robo series and the sequel to the original Chibi-Robo! for the GameCube. It was released in July 2007 in Japan, followed by a North American release the following October exclusive to Walmart stores.

Chibi-Robo! Park Patrol puts the player in the role of the titular character Chibi-Robo, a four-inch-tall robot tasked with revitalizing a park. The player does so by growing seeds into flowers by watering them with a squirter and spreading more seeds by causing the flowers to dance using a tiny boombox. The player can also alter the terrain, build and repair various structures, visit the accompanying town, and defend the park from noxious Smoglings, bits of pollution which can kill flowers.

Park Patrol received generally positive reviews, with some calling it an improvement over the original for its improved graphics, charm, minigames and music, although some gameplay mechanics were criticized. Despite selling well in Japan, it was commercially unsuccessful in North America due to its limited release. A third game in the series, Okaeri! Chibi-Robo! Happy Richie Ōsōji!, was released in July 2009 in Japan only.

== Gameplay ==
Chibi-Robo watering flowers with the squirter item, with his battery life displayed in the top right. On the bottom screen the player uses touch controls to push the water out of the squirter.

Key elements from the first game are in Chibi-Robo! Park Patrol, such as losing watts by walking and performing actions. New features, such as the game taking place primarily outdoors. There are many tools to use, with some returning from the first game, such as the boombox and the clippers. There are also new modes of transportation called Chibi-Rides, which are vehicles like carts and bikes that the player can ride in.

The game has two main areas: the park, and the town. The park is where the player spends most of their time in. They water buds with their squirter, and they grow very quickly into either white flowers or colored flowers. If they are white, they use their boombox to make them change color and spread seeds. The boombox does not work on colored flowers. To use the boombox, the player must select it in their inventory near white flowers. A wheel will appear on the screen when they select it. The wheel must then be spun at a moderate pace to play a catchy tune, and it is advised not to spin it too fast or too slow. At the end of each tune, there is a rating that scores their pace from 0–100. If the player gets a rating below 70, nothing will happen. If they get a rating of 70 and up, their flower will change into a different color and will spread seeds to the surrounding area. If they grow 30 flowers in one area, the area will turn from fertile soil to green spaces. In green spaces, the player cannot plant anymore flowers in the area, unless they lose a flower in that area. Flowers cannot grow if they are in sand.

In the town part of the game, there is a flower shop, a hamburger joint called Monkey Burger, and an alley where the player's friends hang out. At the flower shop, the player can clip flowers from the park and give them to the clerk to earn many Happy Points. They can collect Happy Points by doing good deeds like planting flowers or defeating Smoglings. There is also a special flower of the day that if the player gives one to him, he will triple the Happy Points. The Smoglings are the main enemies in the game. They turn the player's flowers black, causing the flowers to wither at dusk. The player defeats them by squirting them with water until they pop, spraying water and releasing seeds, and the player can prevent Smoglings from appearing using the holes in the ground that they appear out of until the holes shrink away to nothing. Smoglings can also react to food items like candy if players give some to them. Smogglobs are giant versions of Smoglings and turn flowers into black flowers when they step on them and into Miasmo flowers when they release smoke. Miasmo flowers still wither at dusk, but players can purify them by squirting them or walking over them. To defeat a Smogglob, players need to knock it down with a vehicle and squirt at it until it pops, releasing several buds and spraying water in a manner similar to that of the Smoglings.

== Plot ==
Citrusoft, the company from the previous game, creates a new model of Chibi-Robos called the Blooming Chibi-Robo to help heal the declining health of the planet. This new model is distributed to parks everywhere for free to improve their quality and get more people to visit them and care about the environment. One Chibi-Robo is sent a park in desperate need of help after it has been forsaken by the people of the nearby town. Over the course of his mission, Chibi-Robo is aided by a manager robot named Chet and makes friends with many of the town's toys (consisting of a puppet magician named Francois, two toy penguins named Pop and Fizz, a toy tree named Molly Maple Leaf, a toy car named Chassy, a toy monkey named Kid Kombo, a Free Ranger named Tampa, and a toy football player named Bull), who are eager to help him restore the park. He is also impeded by black creatures called Smoglings, their general Sergeant Smogglor, and their leader Miasmo, who are determined to spread pollution and stop the park's revitalization by any means necessary.

Chibi-Robo also helps out the toys with their own problems such as upgrading Chassy to a hot rod, restoring Bull's colors, helping Pop and Fizz get back together after an argument, and helping Molly become a real tree with Francois's help and in return, Molly helps free Francois from his strings.

As Chibi-Robo continues his mission, Sergeant Smogglor's backstory is revealed: he was once a toy called General Greenthumb who was originally owned by a child, but was abandoned at the park. Greenthumb came alive and, seeing the beauty of the park, he swore to protect it. Soon after, Miasmo attacks with a group of Smoglings. Later, Greenthumb managed to infiltrate Miasmo's factory base, determined to face him, but he is quickly overwhelmed and Miasmo uses his power to brainwash him, turning him into Sergeant Smogglor. After this final flashback, Greenthumb is freed from Miasmo's control. Miasmo appears to him, calling him a useless piece of trash, and abandons him. With his memories restored, he is upset by his actions and leaves.

After enough flowers are planted, Miasmo transports Chibi-Robo to his dimension Exhaustia for the final fight. Greenthumb appears and sacrifices himself to help Chibi-Robo defeat Miasmo, although he claims that he can never truly be stopped as long as humans continue their current ways. Miasmo's defeat causes the Smoglings to turn pink, indicating that they are now friendly. Seeing the beauty restored to the park, Greenthumb is grateful for Chibi-Robo for his hard work. With a final farewell, he dies, giving Chibi-Robo an energy ball that grants him infinite battery power. Greenthumb's owner arrives and, convinced that Greenthumb is the one who restored the park, finally shows him some respect and takes him home.

== Development and release ==
Chibi-Robo! Park Patrol was developed by Skip Ltd., the same company responsible for the original Chibi-Robo! on the GameCube, but was designed by a separate department led by one of the first game's directors, Hiroshi Moriyama. His co-director for that title, Kenichi Nishi, was not involved in the creation of Park Patrol. Other team members included gameplay designer and animator Fumikazu Tanaka; programmer Masahiko Kikuchi; map and object designer Daisuke Ooshita; and supervisor Kenyuki Ueda.

After the release of Chibi-Robo!, Moriyama and some Skip associates opened an office in Harajuku to start a new project. Nintendo producer Kensuke Tanabe asked the team to specifically develop an appealing game using a different approach from the original Chibi-Robo!. Tanabe emphasized: "While the feature like the miniature garden that GC Chibi-Robo! had are taken over, I am asking them to aim at establishing a game system where the game’s emphasis is on freedom and enjoyable gameplay, rather than the game events". The team members took a design approach that Ueda likened to jazz improvisation. After deciding the game should take place in a field, the Squiter item was implemented to make water flowers and the field setting became a park. Kikuchi was tasked with making all items require the DS touchpen functionality. Tanaka stated that having Chibi-Robo dance to bloom the flowers was inspired by a scene from the 1988 Michael Jackson film Moonwalker.

Park Patrol was announced at E3 2006. The game was subsequently released in Japan on July 5, 2007, then later in North America on October 2. The game was initially released in North America as a Walmart exclusive because of the company's alleged "strong environmental program and social giving campaign". To promote the game, Nintendo of America gave out packets of seeds to 500 randomly selected people who registered the game on the company's website. The game never had a European release, though Australia saw a release in early 2008.

== Reception ==
Reception

Aggregate score
Aggregator	Score
Metacritic	78/100

Review scores
Publication	Score
1Up.com	B
Eurogamer	3/5
Famitsu	31/40
GameSpot	8/10
GameSpy	8/10
GamesRadar+	3.5/5
IGN	7.8/10
Nintendo Life	9/10
Nintendo Power	8.5/10
Nintendo World Report	9/10

Critical reception for Chibi-Robo!: Park Patrol was generally positive. The game currently has a Metacritic rating of 78 out of 100 based on 14 reviews. GameSpot cited that it had "an innovative use of the touch screen, fun minigames and a great cast of characters but had slow paced gameplay and the minigames would have been great for multiplayer".

According to Media Create, Chibi-Robo! Park Patrol entered the Japanese sales charts at number two, selling over 45,000 units. An additional 26,905 copies were sold the following week. By the end of 2007, the game sold 160,376 copies in Japan. Gamasutra stated that Park Patrol apparently did not fare as well commercially in North America due to its limited release. The website ranked it as the fifth-most overlooked game of 2007. Park Patrol was followed by a third game in the series, Okaeri! Chibi-Robo! Happy Richie Ōsōji!, released in Japan in 2009. This game has a similar premise as the original Chibi-Robo!.
