= Base 10 (video game) =

2008 video game

- Developer: Skip Ltd.
- Publisher: Nintendo
- Series: Art Style
- Platform: Nintendo DSi
- Release: JP: December 24, 2008; AU: April 2, 2009; EU: April 3, 2009; NA: July 6, 2009
- Genre: Puzzle
- Modes: Single-player, Multiplayer

Base 10, known as Code in PAL territories and Decode in Japan, is a puzzle video game developed by Skip Ltd. and published by Nintendo for the Nintendo DSi's DSiWare digital distribution service.

== Gameplay ==
The game involves players lining up numbers so that they total up to 10. However, as the numbers resemble those from an LCD, players can flip around numbers (for example, a 2 can be reversed to become a 5) to complete their objective.

The options featured include a sprint game involving 2 to 10 different digits, a puzzle mode and an endless mode.

There is even a multiplayer option where two players can go head to head with the other player acquiring Base 10 through DS Download on any Nintendo DS console.

== Development ==
Base 10 was announced for the DSiWare service on October 2, 2008 at a Nintendo conference alongside the reveal of the service as Decode. It was tentatively titled Code 10. It was eventually released on December 24, 2008 on the DSiWare's launch. It was developed by Skip Ltd. and published by Nintendo.

== Reception ==
Reception

Aggregate score
Aggregator	Score
Metacritic	77/100

Review scores
Publication	Score
Eurogamer	7/10
IGN	8/10

Base 10 received a 77/100 on Metacritic based on 9 reviews, indicating "generally favorable" reviews. Kotaku felt it looked intriguing, saying it might be their first DSiWare purchase when it releases. PC World called Code the "bar none best math game ever." IGN was initially skeptical, but became addicted to its gameplay. Following the Japanese release, IGN suggested players should purchase Base 10 and fellow Art Style game Aquia over other early DSiWare releases. Pocket Gamer called it polished, hoping that future DSiWare games would be as good as this. They praised how the audio is performed in the game, comparing it to the puzzle game Lumines. They included it in their list of the best Nintendo DS games of 2009, stating that it was a standout of the Art Style series. However the game has been criticized for its lack of a left-handed option by Kotaku and GameZone. Nintendo World Report enjoyed the game, but noted that it is only good for right-handed players.
