= Orbient =

2006 video game

- WiiWare image for Orbient
- Developer: Skip Ltd.
- Publisher: Nintendo
- Directors: Hiroaki Ishibashi, Jun Sasaki
- Producers: Kensuke Tanabe, Hiroshi Suzuki
- Designer: Koichi Mikado
- Composers: Hiromichi Fujiwara, Kazuomi Suzuki
- Series: Art Style
- Platforms: Game Boy Advance, WiiWare
- Release: Game Boy Advance: JP: July 27, 2006; WiiWare: NA: September 29, 2008; PAL: December 19, 2008; JP: May 12, 2009
- Genre: Puzzle
- Mode: Single-player

Orbient, known in Japan as Orbital, is a puzzle video game developed by Skip Ltd. and published by Nintendo for the Wii's WiiWare digital distribution service. It is one of twelve games in the Art Style series of video games available for WiiWare and DSiWare. It is a remake of a Japan-only Game Boy Advance video game titled Orbital, released for the bit Generations series of video games.

The objective of Orbient is to control a white star which grows larger by absorbing blue stars and collecting smaller gray stars to form orbiting satellites.

While the original bit Generations version was met with mixed reactions, the WiiWare version of Orbient was very well-received, holding an average score of 82.3% and 82/100 from GameRankings and Metacritic respectively.

== Gameplay ==
In Orbital, players control a white star. The game starts with the white star able to take 5 hits before it is destroyed. To make it grow, the player must collide their star with a similar-sized, blue star. Stars smaller than the player's star are gray-colored. Colliding with enough of these stars can increase the white star's size, but if the player positions the white star just right, the gray star will orbit the white star and become a satellite. Red stars are bigger than the white. The white star is able to orbit red stars within their rings to help travel through space, in an inverse to collecting satellites. (Note: The player's star orbits stars in perfect circles that are always centered on the star's center. The player's star must leave its current orbit to start orbiting another star.)

Whenever the white star grows large enough, the target star glows orange, and can be secured in the player's orbit; as soon as that happens, a small crescent star appears, and having it successfully orbit the white star will give the player bonus points, (collecting all different crescent stars unlocks new galaxies and are also the goal to complete the game 100%). Colliding with the orange star will take away a hit, but having it orbit the white star will clear the round.

The player guides the star by pressing the A and B buttons on the Wii Remote to utilize gravity and anti-gravity, respectively, and attract it towards or repel (also respectively) the gravitational wells of celestial objects. If orbiting a star, only the orbited star will respond. Players must be careful not to crash their star into the red stars or floating objects like asteroids, which take away a hit. Asteroids may not be attracted to, repelled from, or orbited, and the goal star may not be orbited. Levels wrap around both horizontally and vertically, meaning any object, including the player, that leaves one side of the level will appear at the corresponding position on the other side.

In Orbient, the controls are identical, but some details have been changed. When attracting or repelling, visual effects from stars in range are shown; attracting pulls white particles from responding stars to the player's, while repelling shows yellow rings of particles on responding stars. Gray stars can no longer increase the player's size, and the player's star's satellite orbit ring now shows the actual, larger range. Satellite music only starts playing at three satellites. Asteroids are now purple. When approaching a red star at the orbiting angle, the player will see white dots showing the orbit trajectory; while in orbit, a translucent ring shows the orbit trajectory. When the player's star is big enough to secure the goal star, radio waves show the direction to the goal star.

New to Orbient is the black hole. It appears with a purple outline and multiple spiraling lines. If the player's star is close enough, the black hole will try to pull it in; this is denoted by the lines connecting to the player's star. The black hole may not be orbited like a normal star, and it cannot pull the player out of the orbit of a star. The player can attract to and repel from the black hole like any other star. Being pulled in will take away one life and force a restart of the level.

In both versions of the game, when the player secures the goal star in orbit, their star loses collision with all objects, including black holes (though they can still pull the player's star). This prevents failure of the level after securing the goal star.

=== Scoring ===
At the end of each round, the player gets scored on the number of stars consumed or collected as satellites, bonus points for clearing the stage with a time faster than the set "official time", and bonus points for collecting the crescent star as a satellite, and adds it to the total. Times or total scores that show in red are new records. Satellites, including the orange and crescent stars, are then converted into extra hits for the next stage.

== Development ==
Orbient was originally released for the Game Boy Advance as Orbital under the bit Generations label on July 27, 2006 exclusively in Japan. This version was announced on June 1, 2006. Nintendo announced that they would be giving free copies of the games in the series to 700 members of the Club Nintendo website in exchange to feedback on them, though only to people who own a Game Boy Advance or Nintendo DS. Nintendo filed for an ESRB rating for this title in the US. It was later remade for the Wii's WiiWare service in the Art Style series. Both versions were developed and published by Skip Ltd. and Nintendo respectively.

== Reception ==
Reception

Aggregate scores
Aggregator	Score
GameRankings	83.17%
Metacritic	82/100

Review scores
Publication	Score
Eurogamer	8/10
GameSpot	7/10
IGN	8.5/10
Nintendo Life	8/10 stars
Nintendo World Report	9/10
The A.V. Club	B+

Orbient received positive reviews from critics upon release. On Metacritic, the game holds a score of 82/100 based on 11 reviews, indicating "generally favorable reviews". On GameRankings, the game holds a score of 83.17% based on 12 reviews.

The bit Generations version of Orbient received mixed scores from Famitsu, receiving a 7/9/6/7 from them. IGN praised the simplicity of the gameplay and the improvements made to the original, and called it "an incredibly mellow, relaxing experience", yet at the same time "one of the most challenging games you'll ever play". GameSpot found the physics-based puzzles to be clever, but criticized it for lacking that "must-play, addictive appeal" and for its lackluster presentation. Eurogamer called it a quietly brilliant game, and called it the most interesting and rewarding of the three WiiWare games released so far. It was nominated for multiple Wii-specific awards from IGN in its 2008 video game awards, including Best Action Game and Most Innovative Design.
