= Digidrive =

2006 video game

- Developer: Q-Games
- Publisher: Nintendo
- Director: Dylan Cuthbert
- Producer: Kensuke Tanabe
- Programmers: Masahiro Yokota; Ryuji Nishikawa
- Artists: Yoichi Kai; Aine Shioya
- Composer: Toshiyuki Sudo
- Series: bit Generations; Art Style
- Platforms: Game Boy Advance; Nintendo DSi
- Release: Game Boy Advance: JP: July 13, 2006; DSiWare: PAL: October 2, 2009; JP: November 4, 2009; NA: November 16, 2009
- Genre: Puzzle
- Mode: Single-player

Digidrive, released in PAL territories as Intersect, is a 2006 puzzle video game developed by Q-Games and published by Nintendo for the Game Boy Advance. It is the only game in the bit Generations series to not be developed by Skip Ltd. It was later re-released for the Nintendo DSi's DSiWare digital distribution service as part of the Art Style series, where it was released outside Japan for the first time.

== Development ==
According to director Dylan Cuthbert, the inspiration came from the police direction of the floats during the Gion Festival in Kyoto. He also stated that the original game idea was developed long before the bit Generations series was conceptualized, and that the original design was more "cute", before being redesigned to match other games. Development was completed in 2005 and the game was released the following year.

== Gameplay ==
The objective of the game is to propel the disc-shaped corevto as many meters as possible before the piston collides into the core and ends the game. The player must direct up to three different varieties of "vehicle," each of a different color, into one of four different lanes. If five of the same vehicle fill up the same lane, a triangle will appear and the lane will change to the same color as the type of vehicle that entered this lane.

Once the player get all five cars of the same color in all four directions, it results in an overdrive, where they can send vehicles of their color in the direction of that color before the color in that direction goes away, but once the vehicle goes in the right direction, it fills that direction up. Overdrive ends when either a vehicle goes in the direction that does not match the color, or if a direction did not have a vehicle of that color in that direction in the last few seconds.

== Reception ==
Reception

Aggregate score
Aggregator	Score
Metacritic	83/100

Review score
Publication	Score
Nintendo Life	9/10

Digidrive has received a score of 83/100 on Metacritic based on 6 reviews, indicating "generally favorable" reviews. James Newton of Nintendo Life gave the game a 9/10 score, praising its innovative and addicting gameplay.
