= Chibi-Robo! (video game) =

2005 platform-adventure video game

- North American GameCube cover art
- Developer: Skip Ltd.
- Publisher: Nintendo (Note: Publishing duties originally handled by Bandai)
- Directors: Kenichi Nishi; Hiroshi Moriyama
- Producers: Kensuke Tanabe; Hiroshi Suzuki
- Designers: Sayoko Yokote; Ryosuke Sumida; Hiroyuki Takanabe; Alberto Gonzalez
- Programmers: Masaru Hori; Shunsuke Yoshida; Junko Muroyama
- Composer: Hirofumi Taniguchi
- Series: Chibi-Robo!
- Platforms: GameCube, Wii
- Release: GameCube: JP: June 23, 2005; NA: February 8, 2006; EU: May 26, 2006; Wii: JP: June 11, 2009
- Genres: Platform, adventure
- Mode: Single-player

Chibi-Robo! Plug Into Adventure! (Note: ちびロボ (lit. "Mini-Robo!") in Japanese) is a platform-adventure video game developed by Skip Ltd. and published by Nintendo for the GameCube console. It was released in Japan in 2005, and in North America and Europe the following year. Originally conceived as a point-and-click adventure game, it was put on developmental hold until Nintendo producer Shigeru Miyamoto gained interest in the title and overhauled its production.

The player takes on the role of the eponymous Chibi-Robo, a 10-centimeter-tall robot owned by the Sanderson family. Gameplay revolves around navigating a household and collecting "Happy Points" by completing various tasks from housework to helping solve the dilemmas of the Sanderson family and the numerous living toys that inhabit their household. Every action consumes energy, requiring the player to recharge using electrical outlets.

Chibi-Robo! was generally well received, with praise for the premise, the charming storyline, and sound design, but some gameplay mechanics and the quality of the graphics drew some criticism. Sales of Chibi-Robo! were modest. It spawned several sequels. For the Nintendo DS, Chibi-Robo!: Park Patrol was released in 2007 and Okaeri! Chibi-Robo! Happy Richie Ōsōji! was released in 2009, the latter being a Japan-exclusive. For the Nintendo 3DS, Chibi-Robo! Photo Finder was released in Japan in 2013 and in North America in 2014, and Chibi-Robo! Zip Lash was released in 2015. The original Chibi-Robo! saw a Japanese re-release in 2009 for the Wii as part of the New Play Control! series and worldwide in 2025 on the Nintendo Switch 2 via the GameCube Nintendo Classics service.

== Gameplay ==
Cleaning pawprints from the floor using the toothbrush is just one way for the player to earn Happy Points. The game's HUD shows the player's remaining time (upper left) and battery life (lower right).

Chibi-Robo! is a platform-adventure game that puts the player in direct control of a tiny, battery-powered robot that does housework for humans. The objective of the game is to become the top-ranked "Super Chibi-Robo" in the world by accumulating Happy Points, a collectible gained by doing good deeds for the family and for various toys in the Sandersons' home. In order to do this, the player must control Chibi-Robo and explore the Sandersons' home. The game has sandbox-style exploration when navigating the house. During exploration, Chibi-Robo can find a wide variety of things to collect, including "Moolah", the currency of Chibi-Robo!. An important task in gaining Happy Points is to clean up messes around the house, such as disposing of trash or scrubbing dirty footprints. The player can also interact with and help with the personal problems of the Sandersons and the toys. This ranges from solving a plot-driving crisis or completing a subquest of simply locating a lost object as a favor. With Chibi-Robo's assistant Telly Vision as his speaker, the player is often prompted to give either a positive or negative response to each question or request. The player loses battery power with every step and action. If his battery is not charged before it empties, Chibi-Robo will collapse and re-emerge in the Chibi-House, having lost half of his Moolah. Throughout the house are electrical outlets, which the player can plug into to recharge his battery or save his progress. The player's exploration is limited by a timer representing a full day or full night. Once the timer expires, Chibi-Robo automatically returns to the Chibi-House.

There are three collectibles in the game. One is the stickers, which can be obtained throughout the game, either by completing the game, completing quests, playing mini-games, or doing simple tasks for other non-player characters. The Second is the Frog Rings which can be collected and given to Jenny, the daughter of the Sanderson household, for Happy Points and a sticker. The third is the crayons found throughout the house which can be deposited in a crayon box for Happy Points.

At the start of both day and night, the player begins in the Chibi-House, where they can charge Chibi-Robo's battery, save at the electrical outlet, or connect to the Citrusoft "Chibi-PC" to purchase a variety of items and power-ups with Moolah and use scrap metal to build "Utilibots", robotic helpers that ease the navigation of the Sandersons' home. The gear available from Citrusoft includes the "Chibi-Copter", used to reach far-off points or fly down from a high place safely; the "Chibi-Blaster", used to eliminate obstacles and fend off the hostile Spydorz; and the "Chibi-Radar", used to detect hidden objects. There are several other items of the Sandersons' that Chibi-Robo can find and use. These include the toothbrush, used to clean up stains; the coffee mug, used for protection; the spoon, used to dig holes; and the squirter, used to hold fluids and squirt them. Chibi-Robo can also gain special costumes throughout the game, each of which has its own function. For instance, if the player poses for Mr. Sanderson while wearing The Drake Redcrest costume, he will give Chibi-Robo Happy Points. As more Happy Points are acquired, the player's rank increases among all the Chibi-Robos in the world. At certain ranks, Citrusoft will send the player bonus batteries, allowing Chibi-Robo to roam longer without having to recharge until they earn the status of "Super Chibi-Robo", which earns the player unlimited battery life.

== Setting and synopsis ==
=== Setting and characters ===
Chibi-Robo! revolves around a tiny, highly advanced house-cleaning robot of the same name, created by a toy company called Citrusoft Robotics Inc. The game takes place in a 1960s-style American home owned by the Sanderson family, consisting of George, an unemployed former toymaker for Citrusoft's rival, Macrowave Robotics Inc.; Helen, George's wife who is constantly stressed over how much money her husband spends on toys despite his unemployment; and Jenny, their eight-year-old daughter who is socially-withdrawn and behaves like a frog. Chibi-Robo is packaged with a small "Chibi-House" and an assistant named Telly Vision who speaks on his behalf. During the night or when humans are not around in the Sandersons' house, several toys come to life: a superhero action figure named Drake Redcrest, a toy caterpillar named Sophie, a group of egg-shaped army men called the Free Rangers, a wooden pirate named Plankbeard, a teddy bear named Sunshine, a toy fortune teller named The Great Peekoe, a brick-made T-rex named Dinah, a toy mummy named Mort, a toy princess named Princess Pitts, a toy potted flower named Funky Phil, and a black and white toy named Primopuel. Chibi-Robo also meets several animals and creatures consisting of two frogs named Freida and Fred, a plug-headed being named Mr. Prongs, a bluebird, a eggplant-like creature called Kid Eggplant, and the Sandersons' pet dog Tao.

=== Synopsis ===
On Jenny's eighth birthday, she is gifted a Chibi-Robo by George. Each of the one million Chibi-Robos in the world is supposed to collect "Happy Points" by doing good deeds for their owners and must occasionally charge their batteries at electrical outlets; however, their mass consumption of electricity has resulted in an ongoing energy crisis. Chibi-Robo helps the Sandersons and the house's other inhabitants with various tasks, such as helping Sophie express her feelings towards Drake Redcrest, aiding the Free Rangers in their war against Tao after it is believed that he killed one of their men, finding bricks for Dinah's playset, finding Plankbeard's ship and providing him with a crew, finding frog rings for Jenny, helping Frieda find Fred somewhere in the house, finding George's wedding ring and helping him cook burgers, resolving Sunshine's addiction for nectar, playing music for Mr. Prongs, and helping Mort win Princess Pitts' heart. Chibi-Robo eventually finds a large robot in the basement with a missing leg called Giga-Robo, who was once a companion of the Sandersons', but had to be deactivated due to its high electricity consumption. Chibi-Robo attempts to revive Giga-Robo by fully charging its massive battery using the Giga-charger and makes it a goal to find Giga-Robo's missing leg, but is attacked by spider-like robots called Spydorz, which he defeats using his blaster weapon.

When George purchases yet another toy, Helen locks herself in her room and tells him that she wants a divorce, prompting the rest of the family to do housework in an attempt to make up for it. Meanwhile, Chibi-Robo finds a strange pattern in the backyard and uses his radar to contact an alien species. Once the aliens land and greet him, Chibi-Robo uses a time machine made by the visitors to go into the past to find a code to enter a safe in the master bedroom containing Giga-Robo's leg. He returns to the present to open the safe, but several larger Spydorz are released and capture the Sandersons. It is revealed that George originally created the Spydorz to be friends with the Chibi-Robos, but Macrowave reprogrammed them to be hostile, causing George to quit his job. George upgrades Chibi-Robo's blaster, allowing the small robot to defeat the Queen Spydor, recover Giga-Robo's missing leg, and rescue the Sandersons. George apologizes for lying to Helen, and the two reconcile. Once Chibi-Robo fully recharges Giga-Robo's battery, reattaches his missing leg, and finds the passcode needed to turn him on, he reactivates Giga-Robo, and the aliens meet them in the backyard. The aliens explain that the toys are able to walk and talk due to a request from Giga-Robo to give them life and to give all Giga-Robos infinite battery power to prevent their energy consumption. The aliens could not do the latter at the time and returned to their own planet to obtain the item necessary to grant Giga-Robo's wish. They then give Giga-Robo this ability, who shares it with Chibi-Robo and the rest of the robots in the world as well, eliminating the energy problem. Sometime later, George gets a new job at Citrusoft.

== Development ==
Chibi-Robo! was developed by Skip Ltd. Chibi-Robo! was announced in early 2003 with publishing rights held by Bandai. Its original projected release date was June 2003 in Japan and spring 2004 in North America. Unlike the released version of Chibi-Robo!, the beta version entailed the player training Chibi-Robo to defend the home of his inventor from a pair of burglars. The gameplay was different as well; instead of a platform-adventure game, it played like a point-and-click adventure title, where the player was not in direct control of Chibi-Robo, but was rather conveying commands to him by clicking a cursor around the area. The protagonist was also to learn and develop depending on the choices the player made for him. This incarnation of Chibi-Robo! was ultimately put on "indefinite hold" and disappeared from the media. Shigeru Miyamoto was eventually introduced to the game by fellow Nintendo producer Kensuke Tanabe. Miyamoto took a personal interest in the character of Chibi-Robo and signed on as the game's senior producer. The development of Chibi-Robo! was revamped with Nintendo acting as its new publisher. Chibi-Robo! was in development for four years.

Director Kenichi Nishi had previous development credits such as Chrono Trigger, Moon: Remix RPG Adventure and Incredible Crisis. Nishi's approach to game design, even with Chibi-Robo!, was to always take a standard, orthodox method and "crash it, twist it, or create a totally different direction". The reason Nishi chose to make the majority of the cast toys is because humans are "too big to interact with [Chibi-Robo] and create all the drama" and that it added a sense of fantasy to the experience. The family dog Tao had appeared in Nishi's previous games: Moon: Remix RPG Adventure and L.O.L.: Lack of Love. The director based the dog on his own pet because he felt that the "black-and-white color is very simple and universal". Despite the game's overall happy attitude, the game designers put some emphasis on serious topics such as divorce, loneliness, pollution, and loss, in which Nishi said: "If we only concentrate on cheerful fun, we'll lose depth. There's nothing surprising for people if the game looks cheerful and the experience is cheerful. There are no surprises or unexpected things". Still, rather than use these topics as major themes for the player, Nishi felt it would be more effective to bring them in as "ordinary things to enhance the adventure of daily life".

The music and sound in Chibi-Robo! were composed by Hirofumi Taniguchi. He wanted to make unique sound patterns and motifs for each character, and even used human voices to create the system sounds, such as on the menu selections. All of the noises made by Chibi-Robo's actions were phrased. Taniguchi used both woodwind and electronic instruments for the character's actions, the former because "Chibi's actions are not ordinary robotlike actions" and the latter because he did not want to totally eliminate his mechanical characteristics. Different background music is played for the day and night cycles, but they lack melody because Chibi-Robo's footsteps create a melody at random. The tempo of his footsteps was designed to match the background music; if he picks up his plug to walk faster, the music speeds up. All of the game's music was compiled on the Chibi-Robo! Limited Soundtrack, a CD released alongside an official 142-page guidebook and published by Shogakukan in Japan in August 2005.

== Reception ==
Reception

Aggregate score
Aggregator	Score
Metacritic	75/100

Review scores
Publication	Score
1Up.com	B+
Edge	8/10
Eurogamer	8/10
Famitsu	35/40
G4	3/5
Game Informer	5/10
GameSpot	7.1/10
GameSpy	3.5/5
IGN	8.2/10
Nintendo Life	9/10
Nintendo Power	8/10

Chibi-Robo! has enjoyed a generally favorable critical reception. Official Nintendo Magazine ranked it the 88th best game available on Nintendo platforms. The staff felt that it was the GameCube's "last classic". Critics Greg Mueller of GameSpot, Mathew Kumar of Eurogamer, Bryn Williams of GameSpy, Shane Satterfield of G4, and Matt Casamassina of IGN all applauded the game's charming setting, compelling storyline, and complex characters. Casamassina found that the fashion in which the main plot and objectives are sewn together is part of the reason the game is enjoyable. Mueller, Kumar, and Satterfield noted endearing, charismatic qualities among the various toy characters. Kumar heeded Chibi-Robo! as "honestly one of the most touching games I've played in ages" in which the player often becomes engrossed in "events that pan out like miniature plays, with love triangles (nay, love dodecahedrons) between toys, and some scenes with a real pathos behind them". Considering the joyous atmosphere of Chibi-Robo!, Satterfield was pleasantly surprised at its inclusion of controversial topics like divorce and its possible distortion of a target audience. This attribute was criticized by Jinny Gudmundsen, a columnist for USA Today, who thought that the interpersonal issues negate the game's overall charm and render it inappropriate for younger children. Writers for Computer Games Magazine praised Chibi-Robo by interpreting deep, symbolic meaning in its more subtle aspects. The publication found the game to use "overarching narrative arcs" and "stock melodramatic devices" among the Sandersons' dysfunctional interactions, "emotional crisis points, downtime, and rhythms and cycles of action" between its day and night events, and "evocative music" as a way for characters to communicate their feelings.

Opinions on the gameplay of Chibi-Robo! have been mixed. Among the more positive reactions, Casamassina assessed the cleaning mechanics as "very fun and very rewarding", while Kumar compared the game to the Story of Seasons series due to both entities convert seemingly boring tasks into something fun. James Mielke of 1UP.com similarly enjoyed the "near-constant sense of discovery" and the tiny details included by Skip with earning Happy Points and Moolah. Casamassina, Mielke, and Williamson were satisfied that they had to frequently recharge Chibi-Robo, but Mueller was dismayed to have to stop one's current task in order to find an outlet. The GameSpot contributor was also aggravated with the mere five-minute intervals for the day and night cycles, which he considered a major interruption of the game's pacing. Contrarily, Kumar felt the pacing was appropriate and Williamson viewed the feature as a "flexible difficulty level setting". Satterfield proclaimed that although the gameplay is somewhat varied, most of it is constituted by the tedious location and collection of objects for the non-player characters. Jeremy Zoss of Game Informer was displeased with the game as whole and wrote that it was "not a platformer, but more of a 3D adventure game composed entirely of fetch-quests and repetitive menial labor".

The audio design of Chibi-Robo!, particularly its integration of different instrumental tones for the hero's various actions, was lauded by the press. Kumar felt that its utilization of sound could be "the seed of a new way of using music in games". Casamassina commented: "Few developers would be brave enough to create a title whose main character generates varying musical notes whenever he takes a step, but this is exactly what Chibi does - and it's actually very whimsical and cute". Although many critics appreciated the bright and colorful features of the accompanying aesthetics, they also judged the graphical presentation as dated. Casamassina encountered low-polygon 3D models and a below-average frame rate; Satterfield stated that the game operated at "Dreamcast level". Other portions of Chibi-Robo! were assessed as unpolished as well. Several sources noted the game's default camera system to be unwieldy, cumbersome, or frustrating at times, but Mueller noted that switching to the top-down or first-person viewpoints and the ability to center the camera behind Chibi-Robo alleviates most of its problems. Satterfield and Casamassina regarded the cutscenes as awkward and repetitive; the former of the two claimed that they "amount to ugly characters recycling the same animation routine over and over while gibberish comes from their gaping maws". Kumar perceived the game's combat to be "messy", "uninteresting", and "entirely unnecessary".

Chibi-Robo! was not a significant commercial success. According to Media Create, the GameCube version was the fourth best-selling game in Japan for its week ending on June 26, 2005 with nearly 29,000 copies sold. The game managed to sell 97,879 units in Japan alone by the end of 2005. The Wii port of the game did not fare as well; it only sold 11,000 copies in Japan for the week ending on June 14, 2009 and a total of 38,573 copies throughout the remainder of that year.

== Legacy ==
Chibi-Robo! received a sequel in 2007 for the Nintendo DS called Chibi-Robo!: Park Patrol, which follows a different Chibi-Robo as it attempts to revitalize a park. Nintendo established a deal with Wal-Mart for the exclusive rights to sell it in the United States. A second sequel for the DS, titled Okaeri! Chibi-Robo! Happy Richie Ōsōji!, was released only in Japan in 2009. It involves yet another Chibi-Robo vacuuming dirt for money within the home of an adult Jenny. The original Chibi-Robo! was re-released as part of New Play Control!, a selection of Wii remakes of GameCube games. The remake features special Wii Remote controls for the game's tools. Aiming the remote allows the player to change perspective, while pointing it at interactive objects with will be identified with a sound. The remake was released in Japan in June 2009, but Nintendo of America did not permit an English release. A fourth game in the series, Chibi-Robo! Photo Finder, was released in 2013 for the Nintendo 3DS. The fifth game in the series, titled Chibi-Robo! Zip Lash was released in October 2015 for the Nintendo 3DS. The GameCube version was re-released for the Nintendo Switch 2 on August 21, 2025, as part of the Nintendo Classics service.
