= Skip Ltd. =

Japanese video game developer

- Company type: Limited
- Industry: Video games
- Founded: July 2000; 25 years ago
- Defunct: August 2020
- Fate: Dissolved
- Headquarters: Trouadour-403 2-9-6 Sendagaya Shibuya, Tokyo, Japan 151-0051
- Key people: Hiroshi Suzuki (CEO)
- Products: Chibi-Robo! bit Generations; Art Style
- Website: www.skiptokyo.com (archived)

Skip Ltd. (stylized as SKIP) was a Japanese video game developer that had a close relationship with Nintendo. Nintendo published all of their Japanese releases; with the only notable exception being LOL (Archime DS), which Skip published independently. The company's staff included prominent developers from Love-de-Lic such as Kenichi Nishi and Keita Eto. In October 2019, it was reported by OneControllerPort.com that the company had changed its name to Skip Inc. the previous year and had become inactive on all social media. By August 2020, it was reported that the company may have become defunct. In March 2024, a former employee confirmed the company had shut down.

In 2024, a number of former Chibi-Robo! developers started Tiny Wonder Studio, a new game development studio. Their first game, koROBO, was announced in July 2024.

== Games ==
Year	Title	Publisher	Platform
2003	GiFTPiA	Nintendo	GameCube
2005	Chibi-Robo!	Nintendo	GameCube, Wii
2006	Boundish	Nintendo	Game Boy Advance
2006	Coloris	Nintendo	Game Boy Advance
2006	Dialhex	Nintendo	Game Boy Advance
2006	Dotstream	Nintendo	Game Boy Advance
2006	Orbital	Nintendo	Game Boy Advance
2006	Soundvoyager	Nintendo	Game Boy Advance
2007	Chibi-Robo!: Park Patrol	Nintendo	Nintendo DS
2007	LOL	JP: Skip Ltd. NA: Agetec; EU: Rising Star Games	Nintendo DS
2008	Captain Rainbow	Nintendo	Wii
2008	Orbient	Nintendo	WiiWare
2008	Cubello	Nintendo	WiiWare
2008	Rotohex	Nintendo	WiiWare
2008	Aquia	Nintendo	DSiWare
2008	Base 10	Nintendo	DSiWare
2009	Pictobits	Nintendo	DSiWare
2009	Zengage	Nintendo	DSiWare
2009	Boxlife	Nintendo	DSiWare
2009	Precipice	Nintendo	DSiWare
2009	Okaeri! Chibi-Robo! Happy Richie Ōsōji!	Nintendo	Nintendo DS
2010	light trax	Nintendo	WiiWare
2010	Rotozoa	Nintendo	WiiWare
2010	Snowpack Park	Nintendo	WiiWare
2011	Wii Play: Motion (Note: Pose Mii Plus and Flutter Fly mini games)	Nintendo	Wii
2013	Chibi-Robo! Photo Finder	Nintendo	Nintendo 3DS
2015	Chibi-Robo! Zip Lash (co-developed by Vanpool)	Nintendo	Nintendo 3DS

=== Cancelled projects ===
Year	Title	Platform
2005	Eyeball	Game Boy Advance
2009	Untitled Sports Game	Wii
2016	BabyRoBo	N/A
