= Rotozoa =

2010 video game

- WiiWare digital cover art
- Developer: Skip Ltd.
- Publisher: Nintendo
- Director: Jun Sasaki
- Producers: Kensuke Tanabe; Hiroshi Suzuki
- Composer: Kazuomi Suzuki
- Series: Art Style
- Platform: WiiWare
- Release: PAL: May 28, 2010; NA: June 21, 2010; JP: October 18, 2011
- Genres: Puzzle, action
- Mode: Single-player

Rotozoa is a single-player exclusive puzzle video game published by Nintendo for the Wii video game console. The game revolves around a colour-matching concept, with a mechanic similar to that of Snake, taking place within a diffuse world of microorganisms. Developed by skip Ltd., the game is the fifth WiiWare installment in the Art Style series. It was initially released in Europe on May 28, 2010, under the alternative title Penta Tentacles, and followed in North America on June 21, 2010. It was eventually also released in Japan on October 18, 2011, both preserving the launch title of the PAL release and being the final WiiWare game to be released in the former.

== Gameplay ==
Set within a primordial ooze, the player controls a microscopic tentacled organism, known as a rotozoan. The objective of the game is to extend the rotozoan's tentacles by using them to absorb other organisms in the primordial ooze, known as goobugs. To absorb a goobug, the player has to move through the environment and rotate the rotozoan, in order to direct its tentacles to touch it.

As goobugs are properly matched, the tentacles will extend by one segment for each bug absorbed.

However, the tentacle must match the color of the goobug that it makes contact with. If the colours are a match, the tentacle will extend by one segment; but if the colours are a mismatch, the tentacle will break off at the point where the goobug touched it, also resulting in loss of a life. Some of the goobugs in the liquid are easy to absorb, as they simply float about aimlessly, while others may be combative and pursue the rotozoan. If the rotozoan makes too many mismatches with the goobugs it will run out of lives, and the game ends.

To aid the rotozoan on its quest, the game spawns certain items during the progression of a stage. If the rotozoan has lost one or more lives, Heart items may occasionally float by. On every stage, there also spawns one Cyclone item, that can be activated at the player's discretion when absorbed. To activate the Cyclone, the player must press and hold either spin button, in order to build up Cyclone energy. If the rotozoan is damaged during the charging process, the Cyclone energy will discharge, and the player will have to repeat the process. Once the Cyclone energy is fully charged, the rotozoan can unleash the Cyclone. During a Cyclone, the rotozoan becomes invincible, while spinning automatically with all its tentacles spread out. It can then effortlessly absorb any goobug within the ooze for a limited time, allowing its tentacles to extend accordingly when the Cyclone has completed.

In order to control the rotozoan and navigate within the ooze, the player is given a default option to use the Wii Remote controller, holding it in a horizontal position. The direction pad is used to move the rotozoan in any direction, while pressing the 1 and 2 buttons will respectively spin the rotozoan anticlockwise and clockwise. Alternatively, the Wii Classic Controller can be used instead of the Wii Remote. The Classic Controller offers the player greater precision, as the controller's left and right analogue sticks are supported for both movement and rotation. The player can, however, also use the Classic Controller's direction pad for movement, while the a and b buttons serve as alternative rotation buttons. The L and R shoulder buttons can also be used for rotation, ultimately allowing the player to choose any desired combination of buttons.

=== Stages ===
At the beginning of the game, Stages is the only game mode available for play. In this mode, the player is given a goal to extend each tentacle by a given length, in order to complete the stage and unlock the next. In the first level of stages, the rotozoan has only two tentacles. Once the player has completed the first three stages, a new level is unlocked. The next level then allows the player to proceed to a new set of stages, where the rotozoan has three tentacles. Eventually, as the third and fourth levels are subsequently unlocked, the player can proceed with new stages as a rotozoan with four and five tentacles, respectively. The rotozoan's initial pair of tentacles will always be red and yellow, while the third will be blue, the fourth white, and the fifth a green tentacle. As additional tentacles are introduced, bugs with matching colours also appear in each respective stage, thus increasing the difficulty of the colour-matching process, as the player advances to higher levels. While there is no concept of a scoring system in this mode, the game records the time spent completing a stage, allowing the player to compete against their previous best time records.

=== Endless ===
Once the player has completed the five initial stages of the first level, Endless Mode will be unlocked and appear on the title screen. Alternatively, Endless Mode can also be unlocked when the player completes any stage with the No Damage and No Cyclone achievements simultaneously, which rewards the All Completed achievement. In Endless Mode, there are no limits to how far the player can extend the rotozoan's tentacles, meaning the difficulty will increase as the tentacles become longer and more difficult to handle. However, Endless Mode also introduces the addition of Constriction items, as an aid to the player. When tentacles extend to certain lengths, Constriction items will spawn into the ooze, which can then be absorbed by the longer tentacles to contract them into clusters. Initially, Endless Mode only features the two-tentacled rotozoan. However, as new levels are unlocked in Stages Mode, rotozoans with additional tentacles also become available in Endless Mode.

The gameplay in Endless Mode differs slightly from Stages Mode, as goobugs as introduced progressively in waves. While some waves may manifest as goobugs spawning at random positions within the ooze, other waves appear in a more structured manner, like chains of goobugs slowly approaching the rotozoan, or rows of goobugs aggressively running across the screen from both sides. The wave meter, indicated by a series of white dots in the upper right corner of the screen, indicates how many goobugs are needed to be absorbed, before the next wave emerges. The scoring system is another important aspect of Endless Mode, that allows the player to play for a high score. The points earned are determined by the length of each tentacle, so for every goobug that is matched, the player will earn a number of points reflecting the number of cells that the tentacle was extended to. For instance, if the yellow tentacle has four cells, the next yellow goobug absorbed will reward 5 points. If the player is also able to make matches rapidly, a multiplier bonus can be achieved for each match. This bonus will then increase for each successive match, until it peaks at ×5. When the game is over, the highest score achieved is displayed on the title screen, when Endless Mode is selected.

=== Snake ===
Snake Mode plays out the same way as Endless Mode, with the exception that the rotozoan has only one tentacle, whereas the other half of the organism is translucent. The translucent side can then be used to destroy goobugs upon impact, giving the player an advantage. In Snake Mode, too, the player plays for points under the same directions as in Endless Mode, where the highest score achieved is recorded and displayed on the title screen. Uniquely to Snake Mode, however, the goobugs that are in contrast to the colour of the rotozoan's tentacle appear in various colours that are not present in any other mode, including deep blue, magenta and orange. Another unique feature about Snake Mode is the option to unlock and switch between themes. Once the player has managed to unlock the final stages for each level in Stages Mode, completing these with the All Completed achievement unlocks new themes in Snake Mode. The themes feature a background from Stages Mode, and also have a preset colour for the rotozoan's tentacle. This way, the player is rewarded for completing the most difficult sixth and seventh stages of each level in Stages Mode.

== Development ==
Announced at a Nintendo press summit on February 24, 2010, Rotozoa was developed by skip Ltd, under the executive production of Satoru Iwata. The game sports a dark and fluid visual theme, with its graphic design credited to Yohei Kikuchi, while Kazuomi Suzuki's credit for sound design also spans an extensive soundtrack of ethnic beats and chants, fused with atmospheric electronic sounds. According to producer Kensuke Tanabe, the primary focus in the development of an Art Style game is the fusion between "visuals and sounds from an artistic viewpoint, using video games as a method". The soundtrack features a unique song for every stage and mode in the game, adding up to more than 35 tracks. As the player makes progress extending the rotozoan's tentacles, the music will begin to evolve, adding more elements to the sound. In an interview with Nintendo of Europe, Suzuki explained the concept as an idea of making "exclusive experiences that only can be made in video games", also noting that it has been an integral part of the Art Style project itself since its beginning. This feature can be noticed particularly when a significant amount of progress is lost by the breaching of a tentacle, as the additional elements in the music will simultaneously fade. Similarly, when the player rotates the rotozoan, an additional drum loop will layer with the music for as long as either spin button is held, sporting a unique drum pattern for every stage and mode.

== Reception ==
Reception

Aggregate scores
Aggregator	Score
GameRankings	67.43%
Metacritic	68/100

Review scores
Publication	Score
Eurogamer	9/10
IGN	8/10
Nintendo Life	9/10

Rotozoa received generally favorable reviews upon release, garnering a score of 68/100 on the review aggregation website Metacritic and 67.43% on GameRankings. Nintendo Life editor Sean Aaron stated that the game "is a real treat for the senses: it's visually beautiful and controls well with an outstanding soundtrack that engages and immerses the player into the simple, but compelling gameplay", giving the game a rating of 9/10. Craig Harris of IGN was also pleased with the game, noting "[it's] definitely one of the higher tier games in the Art Style series: easy to understand, with a fantastic art style [and] several unlockables that change up the gameplay".
