= Aquia (video game) =

2008 video game

- Developer: Skip Ltd.
- Publisher: Nintendo
- Series: Art Style
- Platform: Nintendo DSi
- Release: JP: December 24, 2008; AU: April 2, 2009; EU: April 3, 2009; NA: April 5, 2009
- Genre: Puzzle
- Mode: Single-player

Aquia, known as Aquite in Europe and Aquario in Japan, is a puzzle video game developed by Skip Ltd. and published by Nintendo for the Nintendo DSi's DSiWare digital distribution service. It was released at the launch of the Nintendo DSi and DSiWare service on April 5, 2009 in North America.

== Gameplay ==
The game requires players to line up blocks in rows of three or more in order to allow their diver to delve deeper into the ocean. This occurs as they move blocks of various sizes (1 x 2, 2 x 1, or 2 x 2) horizontally into a column of coloured blocks. As players move blocks in from one side, they push blocks out of the other side. They can move these blocks up and down the column, as well as rotating their colours configuration, in order to create matches of coloured blocks within the column.

As the diver progresses he will slowly begin to lose his air supply. The player has to refill the diver's air supply by clearing rows of blocks quicker or finding and clearing a row of three special blocks that will appear randomly as the game progresses. Darkness falls from the top of the screen as time goes on too, which makes it more difficult to make matches.

There are two modes to select from in the game, Timed Dive and Free Dive. Timed Dive requires players to clear blocks until the diver reaches a certain depth before he runs out of air, at which point the level ends and the diver descends to the next stage. Free Dive is a never-ending puzzle mode that tests how deep the player's diver can go before he runs out of air.

There is a relaxing Aquarium mode that when unlocked displays a virtual aquarium on the top screen.

== Development ==
Aquario was announced for the DSiWare service on October 2, 2008 at a Nintendo conference alongside the reveal of the service. It was eventually released on December 24, 2008 on the DSiWare's launch. It was announced for an English release in both North America and Europe alongside several other DSiWare games on February 18, 2009 under the titles Azurio or Aquia. It was developed by Skip Ltd. and published by Nintendo.

== Reception ==
Reception

Aggregate scores
Aggregator	Score
GameRankings	69.64%
Metacritic	70/100

Review scores
Publication	Score
Destructoid	8/10
Eurogamer	3/10
GameSpot	7/10
Giant Bomb	4/5
IGN	8.4/10
Nintendo Life	9/10
Nintendo World Report	7/10
Pocket Gamer	5/10

Aquia received mixed reviews from critics upon release. On Metacritic, the game holds a score of 70/100 based on 16 reviews, indicating "mixed or average reviews". On GameRankings, the game holds a score of 69.64% based on 14 reviews.
