= Chibi-Robo! =

Video game series

- Logo since 2015
- Genres: Platform, adventure
- Developers: Skip Ltd. Vanpool (2015)
- Publisher: Nintendo
- Platforms: GameCube, Wii, Nintendo DS, Nintendo 3DS
- First release: Chibi-Robo! June 23, 2005
- Latest release: Chibi-Robo! Zip Lash; October 8, 2015

Chibi-Robo! (Japanese: ちびロボ!) is a series of adventure video games developed by Skip Ltd. and published by Nintendo. The franchise follows a series of tiny robotic units known as Chibi-Robo, whose purpose is to spread "Happiness". Recurring game elements of the franchise include monitoring Chibi-Robo's battery usage at all times, and cleaning Chibi-Robo's nearby environment through a variety of methods in order to collect "Happy Points", the game's collectible representation of the happiness the players instill in others. While the primary purpose of a Chibi-Robo is to assist humans, they have also been shown to assist animals, sentient alien life, and even living toys.

== Games ==
Release timeline
2005	Chibi-Robo!
2006
2007	Chibi-Robo!: Park Patrol
2008
2009	Okaeri! Chibi-Robo! Happy Richie Ōsōji!
2010
2011
2012
2013	Chibi-Robo! Photo Finder
2014
2015	Chibi-Robo! Zip Lash

Aggregate review scores
Game	Metacritic
Chibi-Robo!	75/100 (GCN)
Chibi-Robo!: Park Patrol	78/100 (DS)
Chibi-Robo! Photo Finder	49/100 (3DS)
Chibi-Robo! Zip Lash	59/100 (3DS)

Chibi-Robo! Plug Into Adventure! (Note: Japanese: ちびロボ！; lit. "Mini-Robo!") is a platform-adventure video game for the GameCube developed by Skip Ltd. with collaboration from Nintendo. The game was first released in Japan in 2005, and then released in North America and Europe the following year. Originally conceived as a point and click adventure game, it was put on developmental hold until Nintendo producer Shigeru Miyamoto gained interest in the game and overhauled its production.

The player takes on the role of the eponymous character, Chibi-Robo, a 10-centimeter-tall robot that has a power plug for a tail. Gameplay revolves around navigating a household and collecting "Happy Points". These points are accumulated by completing various tasks from housework to helping solve the dilemmas of the Sanderson family and the numerous living toys that inhabit their household. Every action by the game's battery-powered protagonist consumes energy, requiring the player to recharge using the home's electrical outlets.

Chibi-Robo! was generally well received, with praise for its premise, charming storyline, and sound design, but some gameplay mechanics and the quality of the graphics drew criticism. Sales of Chibi-Robo! were modest, but it did spawn three sequels. For the Nintendo DS, Chibi-Robo!: Park Patrol was released in 2007 and Okaeri! Chibi-Robo! Happy Richie Ōsōji! was released in 2009, the latter being a Japan-exclusive. An entry for the Nintendo 3DS launched in Japan in 2013 and 2014 in North America, entitled Chibi-Robo! Photo Finder. The original Chibi-Robo! also saw a Japanese re-release in 2009 for the Wii as part of the New Play Control! series.

=== Chibi-Robo!: Park Patrol ===
Chibi-Robo! Park Patrol (Note: Known in Japan as Sakasete! Chibi-Robo! (咲かせて!ちびロボ!; lit. "Make It Bloom! Little-Robo!")) is a video game for the Nintendo DS developed by Skip Ltd. and published by Nintendo. It is the sequel of the original Chibi-Robo! for the GameCube.

Unlike the previous game, Chibi-Robo! Park Patrol takes place almost entirely outdoors, and puts the player in the role of the titular character Chibi-Robo, a ten centimeter tall robot tasked with revitalizing a park. The player does so by growing seeds into flowers by watering them with a squirter, and then spreading more seeds by causing the flowers to dance using a tiny boombox. The player can also alter the terrain, build and repair various structures, visit the accompanying town, and defend the park from noxious Smoglings, bits of pollution which can kill flowers.

The game sold 160,376 copies in Japan by the end of 2007, but the game did not fare as well commercially in North America due to its limited release, according to Gamasutra.

=== Okaeri! Chibi-Robo! Happy Richie Ōsōji! ===
Okaeri! Chibi-Robo! Happy Richie Ōsōji! is a video game developed by Skip Ltd. for the Nintendo DS handheld game console. It is the third game in the Chibi-Robo! series, the second released on the DS and a follow-up to Chibi-Robo!: Park Patrol. It was released on July 23, 2009, exclusively in Japan. The game was not released outside of Japan due to the poor sales of the previous entries within other territories.

The gameplay in Okaeri! Chibi-Robo! Happy Richie Ōsōji! is similar to the original Chibi-Robo!. The player takes control of the titular character, a 10-centimeter-tall robot whose job is to clean the inside of a house to make his family happy. Chibi-Robo is owned by Jenny from the previous game, who is now all grown up and living in a house with her son Keith and dog Lucky. The game introduces a tiny vacuum cleaner that Chibi-Robo can use to suck up dirt while connected to a power outlet and a tiny sifter used to find gems which can be turned in for money. The player can use the money to buy furniture for the house over a home shopping network using the telephone. The main difference from the original games in the series is that instead of just having power outlets which let the player charge Chibi-Robo's battery, they need to put rubbish into a trash compactor to get electricity for the outlets.

The game received a high 34 out of 40 from Weekly Famitsu magazine in Japan. It was the fifth best-selling game in Japan during the week of its release, selling 35,000 units. It fell to number nine the following week, selling 23,000 copies. Regional sales of the game totalled 130,092 units in 2009.

==== Plot ====
The story starts in a wrecked building, where Chibi-Robo is stranded there with only six watts left. He looks around for an outlet and detects one far from him, only for the outlet to be blocked by a vent. Chibi-Robo sees another one, and heads toward it. When he gets to the outlet, it gets blocked by another vent. Then he realizes he has no watts left, collapses, and shuts off. He is then recharged and wakes up again, now finding himself in a Chibi-House with his robot manager Telly, who explains that they have been bought by Jenny Sanderson from the first game, who is now an adult with a child named Keith and a dog named Lucky. As Chibi-Robo and Telly leave the house, they are greeted by the family, where Jenny explains that he was purchased to help clean up around the house, since she wasn't able to keep up with housework because of her job, and it becomes apparent that the family has a lot of financial woes.

During Chibi-Robo's time with Jenny's family, he takes part in a "Savings Tournament" to save up money and also meets toys that, like in the first game, come alive when humans aren't around. Some of them include completely new toys and a few returning faces: a toy pig police officer named Iberico, Sarge and the Free Rangers, a wrestler action figure named Habanero, a toy shark named Mesa, a toucan-like alarm clock named Acapella, a tomato-headed toy farmer named Ketchup, and a gold-colored toy skull with a hat named Skullton. Later, Chibi-Robo discovers a casino run by ghosts in the attic controlled by mobster ghost Don De Niro. Chibi-Robo also encounters ghosts who, unlike the ghosts that work for Don, are hostile.

Chibi-Robo does numerous quests for the inhabitants around the house such as collecting hostile ghosts for Don so that he can expand his casino, helping Iberico rid the kitchen of bees and fight off rats invading the house (which will result them confronting a giga-rat and later the rat king), helping the Free Rangers find treasure in the basement, paying a ghost gambling chips to allow access to a certain area in the house, cooking burgers with Keith, cleaning the washing machine for Jenny, helping Ketchup find the Legendary Fork Guitar, helping Habanero win a wrestling match in the casino, and helping Acapella with her apparent voice problems, unaware that she is really an alarm clock and not an actual bird.

During the fifth family meeting, Keith wishes to have his father Karl back. After this, Jenny locks herself in her room at night. Chibi-Robo and Telly sneak in through the drain, and Jenny tells them about Karl. It turns out Karl died in a mysterious accident. He and Jenny never got married, but Jenny gave birth to Keith prior to Karl's death. Keith's wish is unknowingly granted by the ghosts, resulting in Karl's ghost possessing the savings box. When he is in the moonlight, he grows to the size of a human. Following memos left by the ghosts, Chibi-Robo helps get Karl's spirit out of the savings box, but he is still the same size. Karl reveals that he cannot move on because he wishes to marry Jenny. Chibi-Robo goes to search for his and Jenny's wedding rings. He finds one in the closet, but Jenny claims it before he can. Remembering that there's another one in Don's casino, they go to get it, but Don challenges them to win the ring. Karl loses the challenge and is forced the work as a strip dancer, but Don promises to release Karl in exchange for the "Phantom's Treasure", which his wife desires. After finding it, Karl is freed and Don hands over the ring. Keith later learns of his father's return and agrees to help prepare for his parents' wedding. Chibi-Robo attempts to get the savings box to buy a wedding dress, but Don steals it (wanting it as payment for the memos he gave out earlier) and transports Chibi-Robo to the wrecked building in Chibi-Robo's dream. After Chibi-Robo defeats Don and reclaims the savings box, he and Karl set up the wedding in the backyard while Keith buys the wedding dress. After Chibi-Robo gets Jenny to put on the dress, he leads her to the backyard where she is shocked to see Karl, but believes she is dreaming. After the wedding, Karl is able to finally ascend to the afterlife. Jenny is saddened by his departure, but happily embraces Keith, who shows his eyes after he suggests that Jenny should start dating a worker that she met at her job, as Karl would want her to be happy. Sometime after, Jenny tells Chibi-Robo about her father George and the Chibi-Robo that her family previously owned, recalling the events of the first game.

=== Chibi-Robo! Photo Finder ===
Chibi-Robo! Photo Finder
- European cover art
- Developer: Skip Ltd.
- Publisher: Nintendo
- Director: Keita Eto
- Producers: Kensuke Tanabe; Hiroshi Suzuki
- Designers: Sayoko Yokote; Kazuomi Suzuki; Maya Katsurashima
- Programmer: Fumihiro Kanaya
- Artist: Fumikazu Tanaka
- Composers: Hirofumi Taniguchi; Soshiro Hokkai
- Series: Chibi-Robo!
- Platform: Nintendo 3DS (Nintendo eShop)
- Release: JP: July 3, 2013; NA: January 9, 2014; PAL: July 3, 2014
- Genre: Action-adventure
- Mode: Single-player

Chibi-Robo! Photo Finder, (Note: Known in Japan as Jissha de Chibi-Robo! (実写でちびロボ！; lit. Chibi Robo! With Live Action!)) known as Chibi-Robo! Let's Go, Photo! in Europe and Australia, is a video game for the Nintendo 3DS handheld game console via the Nintendo eShop. It is the fourth installment in Chibi-Robo! game series developed by Skip Ltd. and published by Nintendo.

Unlike past entries in the series, Photo Finder doesn't focus on cleaning or performing helpful tasks, but rather, a brand-new mechanic that involves the 3DS's augmented reality capabilities. The game revolves around collecting everyday objects, known as NostalJunk, and placing them on display in a museum. The game still has cleaning functions, as with Chibi-Robo: Plug Into Adventure! and Chibi-Robo: Park Patrol, but Photo Finder turns said cleaning sections into missions Chibi-Robo can access at any time using the Chibi-PC. These missions are jobs that several of the supporting characters send via email, and include cleaning out a garage, or blasting wasabi into various sushi on a conveyor belt. The player is awarded Happy Points based on performance, which function once again as the game's currency. Happy Points can then in turn be traded in for silhouette films that show outlines of household objects, which can be purchased from the shop, which can also be accessed from the Chibi-PC.

Once a film is purchased, the player is then able to shoot a photo with the 3DS's built in camera. The screen will show the silhouette of the household object, and the player's goal is to find an object that matches the outline. After lining the object up with the outline, the player has ten tries to take a picture that most matches the outline. The object's quality is measured by a percentage in the top right corner. If an object is below 60%, it won't transfer. If it's between 60% and 99%, it has a chance of either being transferred, or becoming a NostalDud. If the object has 100% accuracy, it will not only transfer no matter what, but all following objects created with the film will be cutouts, which means that an object won't have to match the outline of the film.

The game also involves exploration stages that can be accessed after unlocking new jobs. These areas allow the player to dabble in more traditional Chibi-Robo gameplay. Rather than unlocking or buying new items in order to better clean and traverse the area, necessary tools are received upon entering the area. Trash and dust piles litter the vicinity, and Chibi-Robo has the option to either clean it up, or just explore the area. In order to leave the area, Chibi-Robo must dispose of the collected refuse in a Recycling Machine located near the exit. The compactor will then reward the player's efforts; the more trash they pick up, the more Happy Points are rewarded.

Like before, Chibi-Robo relies heavily on battery power. Due to his limited battery size, he must constantly watch his Watts meter and conserve his energy by all means possible. Once Chibi-Robo loses all of his Watts, he will power down and collapse on the spot. If this happens during a job, Chibi-Robo will be returned to Mr. Curator's desk and receive no Happy Points. There are two ways to recharge: by plugging into the outlet on Mr. Curator's desk, or by finding a battery hidden in one of the many explorable areas.

==== Plot ====
In the beginning, Chibi-Robo appears in a ventilation system within a museum, with a semi-glowing red button in front of him. After pressing it, a trap door goes off in the floor, and Chibi-Robo falls through. He lands in the Curator's office, where he meets the Curator and a cell phone-like robot named Telly, who is Chibi-Robo's manager. The Curator explains that Chibi-Robo's purpose to collect photos called NostalJunk using silhouette film to help increase the museum's popularity. While performing this task, Chibi-Robo meets living toys and objects around the museum (consisting of Drake Redcrest from the first game, a toy alien named Miss Clayra, small versions of Chibi-Robo called Chibi-Tots, two toy chefs named Ketschburg and Mostardin, a bear-shaped sponge named Joshy Bear, a lion fountain statue named Laroque, a toy squid named Squid Vicious, and three lion toys named Moppi, Moppo, and Moppa) and helps them with their duties in exchange for silhouette film. At one point, the Curator is asked to speak in front of an audience (which doesn't go well due to his stage fright) and later decides to write a book about his museum. In the end, the museum becomes a thrilling success, with the Curator giving Chibi-Robo credit for his efforts.

=== Chibi-Robo! Zip Lash ===
Chibi-Robo! Zip Lash (Note: Known in Japan as Nagenawa Akushon! Guruguru! Chibi-Robo! (なげなわアクション！ぐるぐる！ちびロボ！; lit. Lasso Action! We are Going Around! Chibi Robo!)) is a Nintendo 3DS game. It was released in Japan and North America in October 2015, and in Europe and Australia in November. Unlike past games, Chibi-Robo! Zip Lash is a sidescrolling platformer with emphasis on combat and exploration. In this game, Chibi-Robo uses his tail-like cord as a whip to attack enemies and latch onto objects. Certain collectibles can increase the length of Chibi-Robo's cord. A Chibi-Robo amiibo was also produced to interact with the game. Developers of Zip Lash believed that this game might be the last game in the Chibi-Robo! series if this game did not meet sales expectations, and the game was not received well critically and commercially, considered to be a commercial failure.

==== Plot ====
Chibi-Robo is outside a space station cleaning with Telly, when a news report warns that Gyorians are attacking and draining Earth's natural resources. The Gyorians first arrive in "Oceania" for their water, second in North Africa for their minerals, third the Caribbean for their plant-life and toxic specimens for their use, fourth Europe for the energy grid, fifth North America for the manufactory, and lastly the South Pole to harvest ice caps for off-world use. Chibi-Robo receives the "Zip-Lash" chip, giving him capability for combat. He can receive elemental power-ups in certain stages, and can upgrade his battery and gain more access to power outlets, his amiibo also grants him a special golden form. After defeating the Gyorians in all 6 worlds they are stealing resources in, Chibi-Robo unlocks the 7th world "Asia," in which Chibi-Robo infiltrates the Gyorian mothership from the inside, fights the leader of the fleet, and frees the world's stolen resources and candies.

=== Future ===
Due to Zip Lash being a critical and commercial failure, it is theoretically considered the final game in the series, with Skip Ltd. having not made any games since 2015. In August 2020, it was widely speculated that the company had closed down, with evidence such as an HTTP 403 error when opening the company website, the CEO of the company removing the website from his Twitter profile, and new occupation of the company building potentially pointing towards this.

Nintendo tweeted a picture of "Fiery Chibi-Robo" in January 2018, which is of Chibi-Robo using the fire ability. This led to speculation that a Nintendo Direct was close and a new Chibi-Robo game was going to be announced. A Nintendo Direct Mini was released the next day, without a new Chibi-Robo game, although the image of "Fiery Chibi-Robo" has become a meme in the Nintendo community as representation for excitement for a Nintendo Direct.

In July 2024, Tiny Wonder Studio, a new company established by key members of Skip, Ltd., announced the action-adventure game koROBO, which also centers around a small robot. During the Nintendo Switch 2 Direct on April 2nd, 2025, it was revealed that the original Chibi-Robo! game would be re-released on Nintendo Switch 2 via the Nintendo Classics service.
