= Art Style =

Video game series

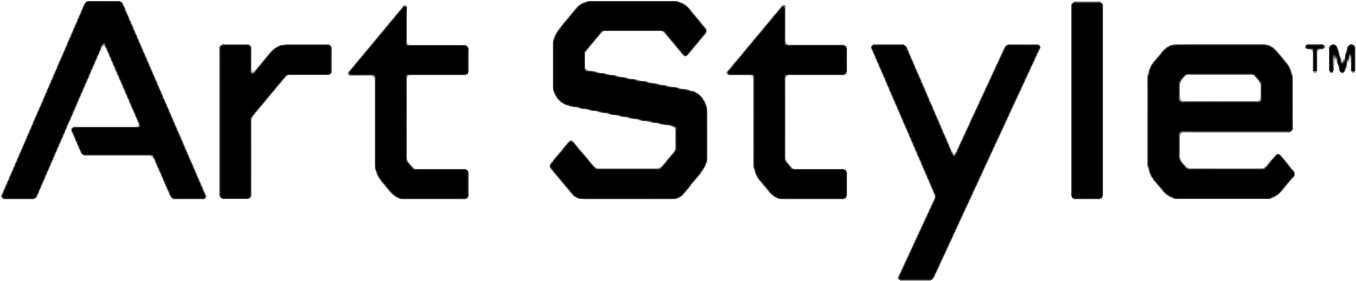
- Developers: Skip Ltd. Q-Games (Digidrive)
- Publisher: Nintendo
- Platforms: Wii; Nintendo DSi
- First release: Orbient; September 29, 2008
- Latest release: Rotozoa; June 21, 2010

Art Style is a video game series developed by Skip Ltd. and published by Nintendo for WiiWare and DSiWare. The first game in the Art Style series, Orbient, was released for WiiWare in September 2008. Another two Art Style games, Cubello and Rotohex, were released during October 2008 while two more were added in 2010. Seven DSiWare Art Style games were released on that service after its launch in Japan in December 2008, with the first two being Aquario and Decode.

According to Nintendo, games in the Art Style series emphasize "elegant design, polished graphics, and pick-up-and-play controls" that create "an experience focused purely on fun and engaging game play." WiiWare titles released in the series cost 600 Nintendo Points, while DSiWare titles cost 500 points.

Art Style was preceded by a series of seven similar games for the Game Boy Advance called bit Generations. The bit Generations series came late in the life of the system and have not been released in Western territories, however some of those games have since been remade as Art Style games (with the exception of dotstream, which was given a sequel titled light trax).

== Games ==
Name			Platform	bit Generations counterpart
North America	Japan	Europe/PAL	Platform	bit Generations counterpart
Aquia	Aquario	Aquite	DSiWare	—N/a
Base 10	Decode	Code	DSiWare	—N/a
Boxlife	Hacolife	Boxlife	DSiWare	—N/a
Cubello	Cubeleo	Cubello	WiiWare	—N/a
Digidrive	Digidrive	Intersect	DSiWare	Digidrive
light trax	lightstream	light trax	WiiWare	dotstream
Orbient	Orbital	Orbient	WiiWare	Orbital
Pictobits	Picopict	Picopict	DSiWare	—N/a
precipice	nalaku	Kubos	DSiWare	—N/a
Rotohex	Dialhex	Rotohex	WiiWare	Dialhex
Rotozoa	Penta Tentacles	Penta Tentacles	WiiWare	—N/a
Zengage	Somnium	Nemrem	DSiWare	—N/a

== See also ==
- Bit Generations
- Bit.Trip
