= Bit Generations =

bit Generations
- Genres: Action, puzzle, art game
- Developers: Skip Ltd. Q-Games (Digidrive)
- Publisher: Nintendo
- Platform: Game Boy Advance
- Original release: JP: July 13, 2006 (Series One); JP: July 27, 2006 (Series Two)

bit Generations is a video game franchise for the Game Boy Advance, published by Nintendo. It was first announced under the name Digitylish at the Electronic Entertainment Expo (E3) in 2005. Each of the games in the series feature simple controls, gameplay and graphics. All the games were developed by Skip Ltd., except for Digidrive, which was developed by Q-Games.

The bit Generations series has only been released in Japan. The games were released in two "series" — the games in Series One were released in Japan on July 13, 2006. Series Two was released on July 27, 2006. However, from June 1, 2006, Nintendo had sent out 700 copies of the games to random Club Nintendo members, encouraging them to preview the games and to post their opinions at the bit Generations official website. Each game costs 2000 yen.

In March 2006, some of the games were given an ESRB rating and were labelled under the title Digilux Series. Stickers depicting the game logos in Super Smash Bros. Brawl indicated that the game series was intended to be released under the title Digilux outside Japan, but Nintendo did not announce a release of the series outside of Japan. Some of the games were eventually released under the Art Style banner for the WiiWare and DSiWare services.

== Games ==
=== Series One ===
==== Boundish ====
Boundish is played similar to the Magnavox Odyssey game Tennis and the arcade game Pong, with players hitting an orb back and forth between two paddles. However, each level of the game contains different objectives that require the player to alter the way the orb is battered about.

==== Dotstream ====
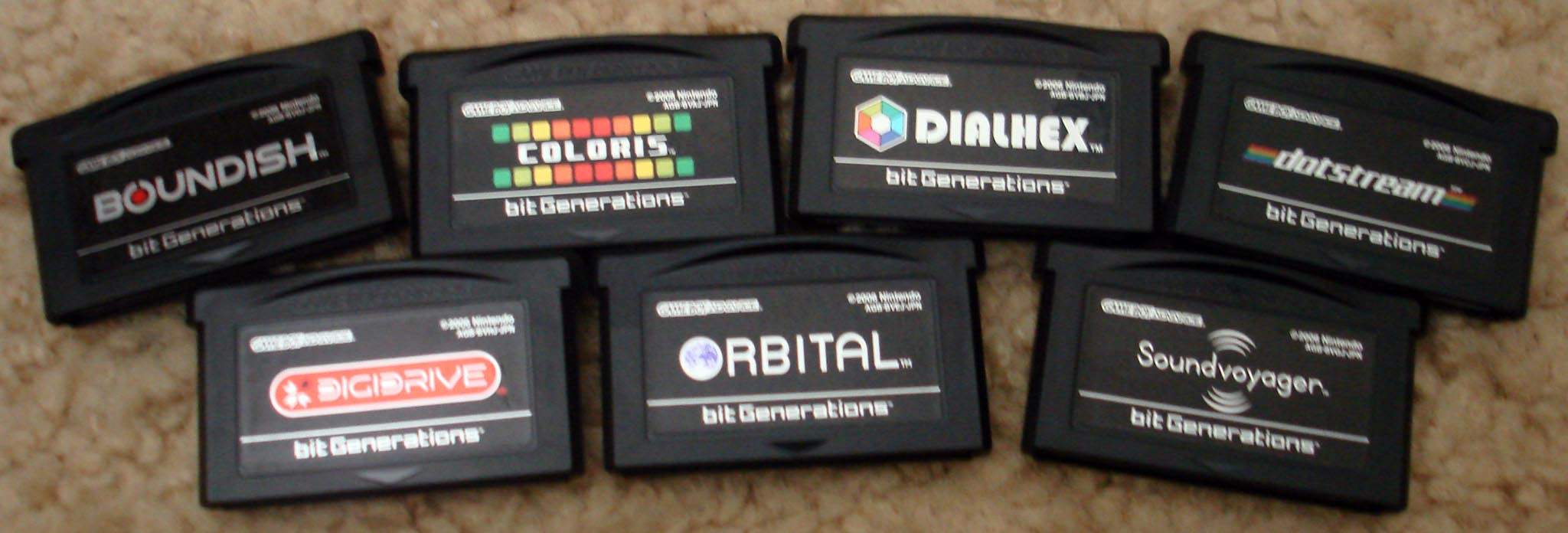
bit Generations cartridges

Dotstream is played by players guiding their dot, which results in a line trailing behind it, through a track filled with obstacles such as squares, rectangles, and circles. Races (known as "drawings") are typically 2 laps long.

Dotstream features three modes, Grand Prix, Spot Race and Formation. Grand Prix is considered the "main game", with players racing around five circuits, with new drawings unlocked in this mode. Spot Race is a time attack mode centered on unlocked drawings. Formation begins with the player starting with one dot and having to collect small pellets to fill up a meter. When the meter is sufficiently filled up, another dot will appear to assist in the collection of pellets. While only the player's dot can be directly controlled, additional dots can be manipulated by holding down the appropriate Formation button.

A WiiWare version was released in North America on May 24, 2010, and in the PAL region on June 25, 2010, under the name light trax.

=== Series Two ===
==== Coloris ====
Coloris sees players eliminating colored squares by altering the color of other squares to make them the same color as the squares nearby.

The game features two different game modes: clear mode and score mode. In clear mode the player must eliminate a certain number of squares (depending on the difficulty level) before moving on to the next level. In score mode the player must eliminate squares to achieve a high score.

==== Digidrive ====
Digidrive is the only game in the series not developed by skip Ltd., instead being developed by Q-Games.

The objective of the game is to propel the disc-shaped core to as many meters as possible before the piston collides into the core and ends the game. The player must direct up to three different varieties of "vehicle", each of a different color, into one of four different lanes. If five of the same vehicle fill up the same lane, a triangle will appear and the lane will change to the same color as the type of vehicle that entered this lane.

A DSiWare version was released in the PAL regions under the name Intersect on October 2, 2009, and under the original Digidrive title in Japan on November 4, 2009, and in North America on November 16, 2009.

==== Soundvoyager ====
Soundvoyager is intended to be playable for blind players by using sound only, without looking at the console's screen. The game involves several different subgames, one of which has players trying to center a dot on a side-scrolling stage on top of an invisible target by only using sounds from the left and right speakers to guide them and another involves the player driving the wrong way down a three-lane road trying to dodge oncoming vehicles by listening to which lane they are in.

== Reception ==
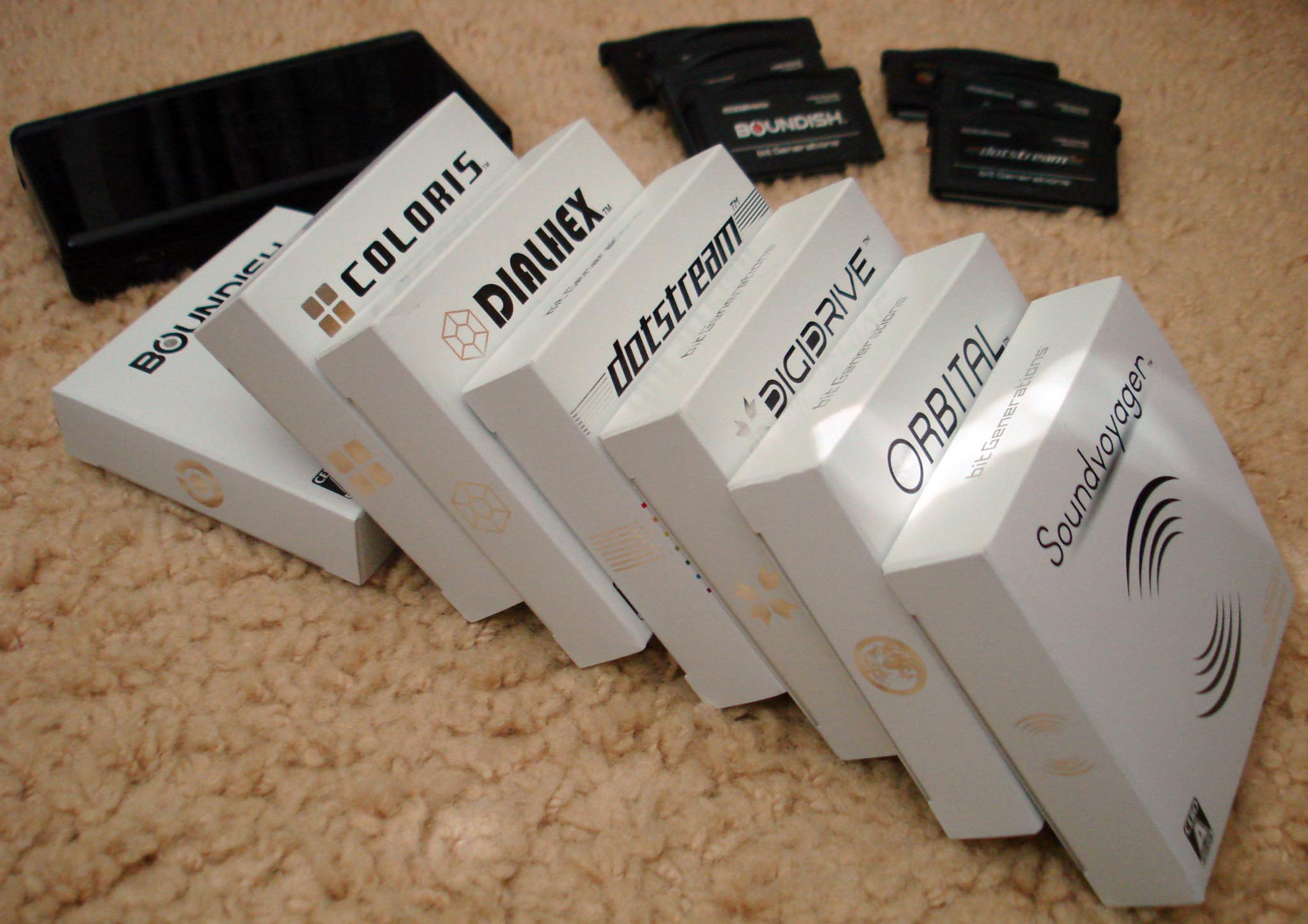
bit Generations game boxes

Famitsu magazine scored games in the bit Generations series varying scores from average to positive. Based on a panel of four reviewers and a maximum score of 40, Dotstream received a 30, Orbital received a 29, Soundvoyager and Digidrive each received a 28, Dialhex received a 27, Boundish received a 26, and Coloris received a 23.

== Legacy ==
Orbital, Chromatron, Boundish, Digidrive, and Rotohex all appear in Super Smash Bros. Brawl as collectible stickers.

== See also ==
- Art Style
- Bit.Trip
