= Professor Oak =

Pokémon character

- Pokémon character
- Professor Oak artwork by Ken Sugimori
- First game: Pokémon Red and Blue (1996)
- Designed by: Ken Sugimori (finalized)
- Voiced by: English: Stuart Zagnit (1998–2006); James Carter Cathcart (2006–2023); Tara Sands (Pokémon 4Ever (Sammy)); Kyle Hebert (Pokémon Origins); Keith Silverstein (Pokémon Evolutions); Joe J. Thomas (Pokémon Masters EX); Japanese: Unshō Ishizuka (1997–2018); Kenyu Horiuchi (2018–present); Keiko Toda (Pokémon 4Ever (Sammy)); Katsuji Mori (Pokémon Origins); Keiichi Sonobe (Pokémon Evolutions); Kenichi Ogata (Pokémon Masters EX)

Professor Samuel Oak, known in Japan as Dr. Yukinari Ohkido (Japanese: オーキド・ユキナリ博士, Hepburn: Ōkido Yukinari-hakase), is a fictional character in the Pokémon franchise that debuted in 1996 video game Pokémon Red and Green. In these games, he is responsible both for teaching the player about how the world of Pokémon works, as well as giving the player-character their first Pokémon. He has since gone on to appear in subsequent entries in the series as well as spin-off games such as Pokémon Snap and Pokémon Channel. He also has a prominent recurring role in Pokémon: The Series, acting as a guide and starting off the journey for series protagonist Ash Ketchum by giving him a Pikachu.

Since his debut, Professor Oak has received positive reception due to his friendly appearance, with critics declaring him to one of the best characters in the franchise and a series staple. Additional commentary was made regarding an unused battle the player could have had with him, with critics disappointed upon the discovery the battle was cut.

== Concept and creation ==
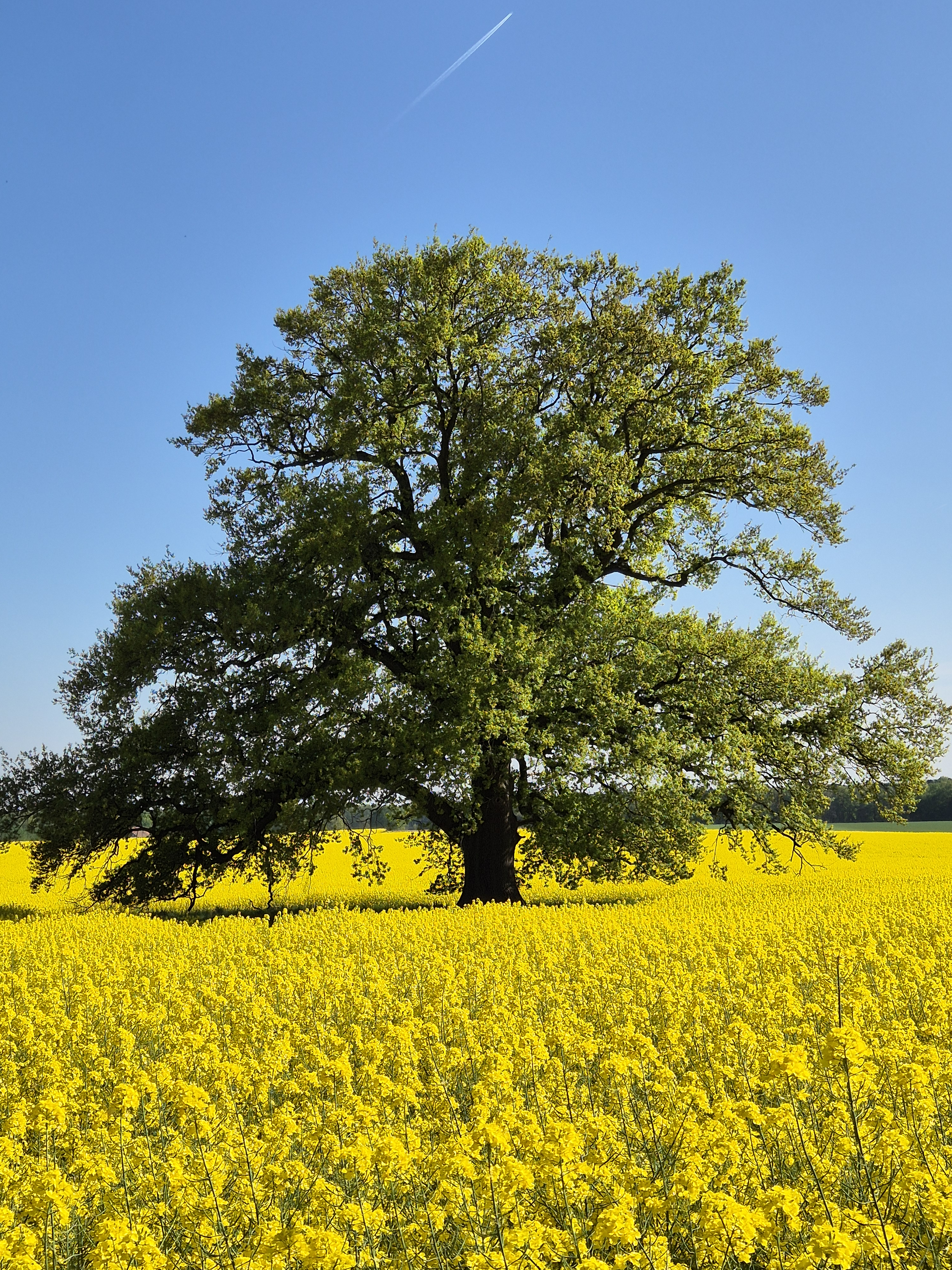
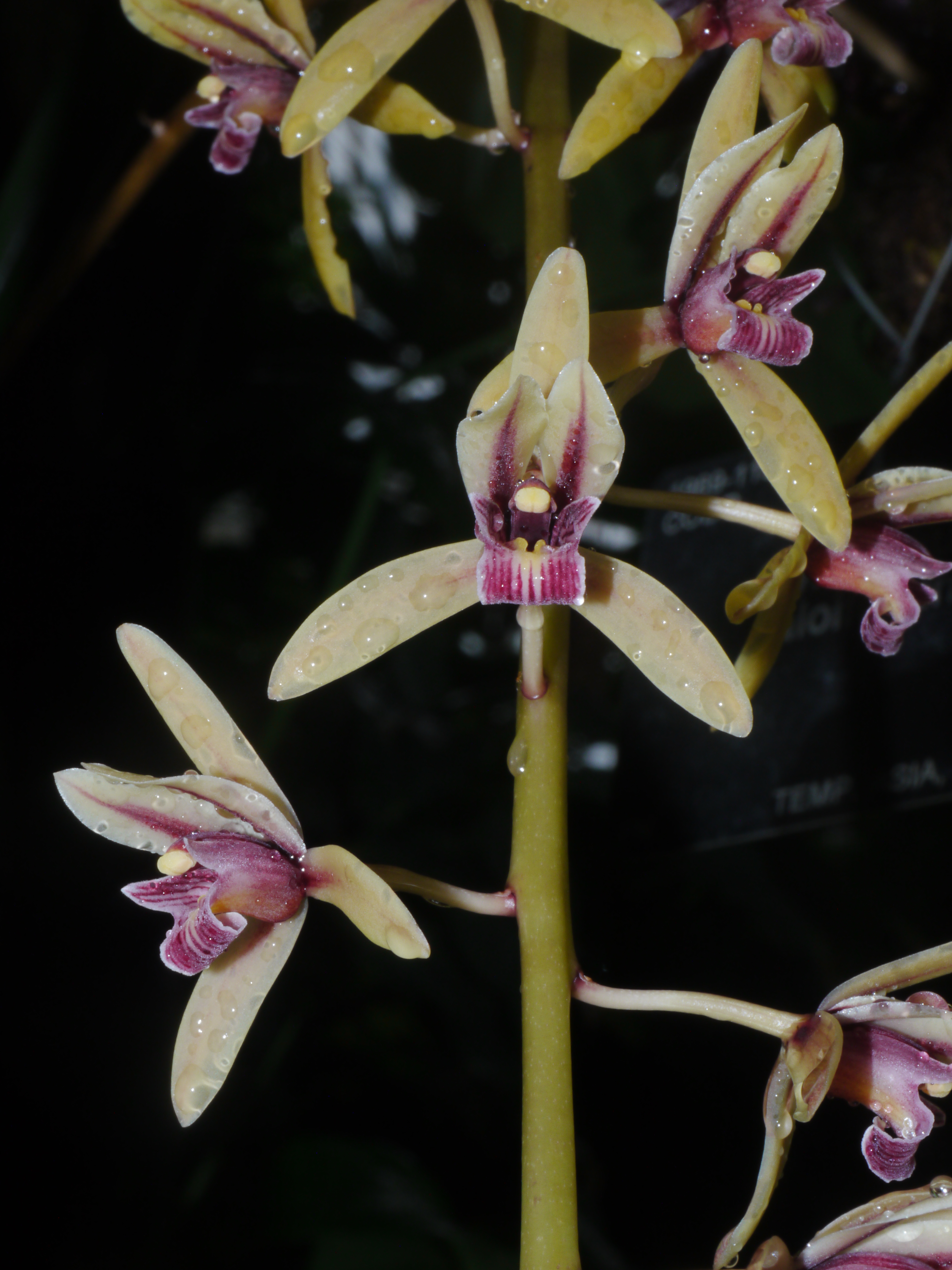
Professor Oak's name originates from the oak tree (left), whilst his Japanese name may additionally derive from the orchid flower (right).

Developed by Game Freak and published by Nintendo, the Pokémon series began in Japan in 1996 with the release of Pokémon Red and Blue for the Game Boy. In these games, the player assumes the role of a Pokémon Trainer whose goal is to capture and train creatures called Pokémon. Players use the creatures' special abilities to combat other Pokémon, and some can transform into stronger species, or evolve. The ultimate goal is to complete the Pokédex, a comprehensive Pokémon encyclopedia, by capturing, evolving, and trading to obtain creatures from all Pokémon species.

Professor Samuel Oak is designed as an old man with short hair and wearing formal laboratory attire such as a lab coat. Although depicted as being both smart and friendly, he is also typically depicted as being rather forgetful, most notably forgetting the name of his grandson. His English name is derived from the deciduous oak tree, with Game Freak stating that the name was chosen due to it being "dependable due to its longevity" as well as sounding similar to his Japanese name, Ohkido, which also may originate from orchid. Oak's name would set a trend where future Pokémon professors in the series would be named after other tree species or flora such as rowan, and sycamore. According to Game Freak developer Akihito Tomisawa, when needing a full name for the character on the Pokédex, he arbitrarily decided to name him after Japanese anthropologist Yukinari Kohara [ja] (香原志勢), which was later officially adopted as the character's name.

In-universe he has a grandson known as Blue, also known as Gary in the anime, is the rival of the protagonist in Red and Blue. He also has a granddaughter known as Daisy. Oak was formerly a competitive Pokémon trainer when he was young, later residing and working in a laboratory in Pallet Town in the Kanto region and becoming an expert in Pokémon. Earlier in his life he also had a close relationship with the Elite Four member Agatha, however, she revealed it fell a part when he left competitive battling and describing him now as a "shadow of his former self."

In Pokémon Sun and Moon, Samson Oak is introduced as the cousin of Samuel who resides in the Alola region. Although they both share similarities in both design and profession, Samson is more relaxed and depicting as having tanned skin, longer hair and wears a Hawaiian shirt, shorts and flip-flops. Similarly, Pokémon Home introduces a variant of Professor Oak called "Grand Oak". Whilst looking similar to the former, as well as both being inventors, he instead sports longer, white hair, a beard, and green, arrow-shaped sunglasses.

In the Japanese version of Pokémon the Series, Oak was originally voiced by Unshō Ishizuka from the first season until the actor's death during the airing of Pokémon the Series: Sun & Moon in 2018. Following Ishizuka's death, it was announced that Kenyuu Horiuchi would take on the role. In the English dub, Oak was voiced by Stuart Zagnit (credited as Stan Hunt). In 2006, Oak's voice actor was later changed to James Carter Cathcart, who also James and Meowth from Team Rocket. Cathcart remained in the role until his retirement from voice acting in 2023 due to throat cancer.

== Appearances ==
=== Games ===
A screenshot of the scrapped battle against Professor Oak. Some critics were disappointed this battle was not included in the final game.

Professor Oak first appears in Pokémon Red and Blue as the grandfather of the protagonist's rival, as well as the person responsible for giving out a trainer's first Pokémon. In the beginning, Oak teaches the player about the world of Pokémon, as well as giving the player a choice between the Grass-type Pokémon Bulbasaur, Water-type Pokémon Squirtle, and Fire-type Pokémon Charmander, with Grass beating Water, Water beating Fire, and Fire beating Grass. Whichever one is chosen, the rival will choose the advantageous Pokémon, while the third remains with Oak. He also gives them a device he created called a Pokédex, (Note: Pokémon Legends: Arceus later retconned this by claiming the Pokédex had existed prior in, however, this likely means that Oak instead created the first digital Pokédex.) which allows them to catalog Pokémon they either see or catch, with the goal that they would catalog all Pokémon in the region. After their rival becomes champion of the Pokémon League and is defeated by the player, Oak will rush over to the Indigo League after hearing that Blue defeated the Elite Four and will induct the player into the Pokémon Hall of Fame. An unused battle with Professor Oak can be found in the games' code featuring a team of five Pokémon, including the fully evolved starter that stayed behind with Oak. In Pokémon Yellow, Professor Oak gives the player a Pikachu instead of one of the three original Starter Pokémon. This is based on the Pokémon TV series, where protagonist Ash Ketchum receives a Pikachu because he slept in and missed the others. The rival, meanwhile, receives an Eevee. Multiple remakes were created of Red and Blue, including FireRed and LeafGreen, where Oak serves in a similar capacity, although will also gift the player the National Pokédex. Another pair of remakes, Pokémon Let's Go, Pikachu! and Let's Go, Eevee!, were released, again with Oak in a similar role. Like Yellow, the player does not get one of the original trio; instead, depending on the version chosen, they will receive either a Pikachu or Eevee from Oak. In a trailer for the games, Oak appears alongside Pokémon Go's Professor Willow to discuss an unidentified Pokémon, with Oak eventually revealing it to be the Mythical Pokémon Meltan.

In Pokémon Gold and Silver, Oak once again teaches about the world of Pokémon, as well as give the player a Pokédex, and is met later by the player during a meeting with a man named Mr. Pokémon. Later, the player receives a radio, which they can use to listen to a show Oak does with DJ Mary. He returns in similar capacity in the games' remakes, HeartGold and SoulSilver. Oak reappears in Pokémon Diamond, Pearl and Pokémon Platinum, where it is revealed he is actually a junior colleague in seniority to the Sinnoh region's Professor Rowan. In these games, Oak gives the player the National Pokédex as well as access to the Pal Park; the latter was changed in the remakes into him giving access to the Ramanas Park instead. Additionally, he is responsible for the Oak's Letter event, whereby giving him the letter with the Mythical Pokémon Shaymin. Other games also feature relatives of Oak. His cousin, Professor Samson Oak, appears in Pokémon Sun and Moon. In these games, Samson is studying the regional forms of Pokémon in the Alola region. He later returns in the enhanced versions, Ultra Sun and Ultra Moon, where he also is in-charge of the Totem Sticker collectables by exchanging the player's stickers in return for them to fight Totem Pokémon. Another variant of Professor Oak, referred to as Grand Oak, appears in the app Pokémon Home. In the app, he serves as the creator of the online system that allows for trading Pokémon, with the desire of creating the ultimate Pokédex with all Pokémon transferred to the app.

Professor Oak has also appeared in multiple spin-off titles, such as in Pokémon Stadium and its sequel where he operates Pokémon transferring via the Transfer Pak. He is able to be battled in Pokémon Masters EX, in which he is partnered with both a Mew and a Nidorino. In the English version of the game, Oak is voiced by Joe J. Thomas, whereas in Japanese he is voiced by Kenichi Ogata. In Pokémon Snap, Oak is responsible for hiring the protagonist, photographer Todd Snap, to take pictures of Pokémon on Pokémon Island; he is then responsible with observing and rating the pictures taken. Appearing in Pokémon Play It! and its sequel, Oak rewards the player with a certificate for answering questions correctly. In some appearances, he has created a new invention and asks the player to test it out, like the PokéHelper communicator in Hey You, Pikachu!, and the titular Pokémon Channel. In other games, such as Pokémon Puzzle Challenge, Pokémon Puzzle League, and PokéROM, he serves as a guide or narrator for the game; the latter game is voice by his at the time anime voice actor, Stan Hunt. Outside of the Pokemon franchise, he appears as a collectable trophy in Super Smash Bros. Melee.

In the Pokémon Trading Card Game, a Professor Oak card first appeared in the original Base Set. He has since appeared on trading cards across multiple sets, with one even being designed by Japanese animator and director Kiyotaka Oshiyama. One of these cards, called Professor's Research, appears in the mobile game Pokémon Trading Card Game Pocket. In October 2025, an event took place in the game where players could earn Professor Oak-themed cosmetics. Alongside his appearance in Base Set, a card known as "Imposter Professor Oak" also debuted in the same set. The card featured a more villainous-looking design, and has the exact opposite effect of Oak's card when played. The Imposter Professor Oak has gone to appear in a few other sets and was meant to appear in Gold and Silver, but was scrapped during the games' development.

=== Other media ===
In Pokémon: The Series, Professor Oak first appeared in the debut episode, "Pokémon, I Choose You!", where he provides the series protagonist Ash Ketchum his first Pokémon, a Pikachu, at his lab in Pallet Town after Ash missed out on the original three Starters due to oversleeping. This sequence of events are also retold in Pokémon the Movie: I Choose You!. The episode also introduces his grandson and Ash's rival, Gary, who was the recipient of one of the Starters from his grandfather. In the following season, Oak would send Ash and his friends to the Orange Islands to retrieve the GS Ball from fellow Professor Ivy. This was followed up in the following season where Oak is unable to figure out the GS Ball and asks Ash to take the ball to an expert named Kurt in the Johto region. This storyline was later dropped after Kurt received the ball. Professor Oak would appear across multiple episodes across the later seasons; between his original appearance and 2006, Oak had appeared in more than 400 episodes. He appears at the beginning of Pokémon the Series: Black & White where he travels with Ash to the Unova region. He would continue to make appearances in Pokémon the Series: Sun & Moon, alongside Samson Oak, as well as in Pokémon Journeys, eventually appearing the final episode of the original series "The Rainbow and the Pokémon Master".

Within the show, Oak is the neighbours with both Ash and his mother, Delia Ketchum. He is often seen together with Delia in many of their appearances. Across the show, he would house many of the Pokémon at his lab that Ash has caught across his travels over different regions. In some of his appearances, he is known to own both a Dragonite and a Rotom.

Professor Oak has also made a number of appearances in the Pokémon movies typically alongside Delia, as seen in Pokémon the Movie 2000 and Pokémon 3: The Movie. He made a prominent appearance in the movie Pokémon 4Ever, where he appeared in the movie as a child Pokémon Trainer from the past named Sammy. In the movie, Sammy is travelling through a magic forest and comes across the Pokémon Celebi. He saves Celebi from a hunter, with Celebi in turn travelling in-time with Sammy where they meet Ash, Misty and Brock. After Celebi is captured to destroy the forest by the antagonist Iron Mask Marauder, a member of Team Rocket, Ash, Sammy, and the Pokémon Suicune work together to save Celebi and the forest. At the end of the movie, it is revealed that Sammy would grow up to become Professor Oak after travelling back to the past with Celebi, with his encounter with Celebi inspiring him to become a scientist and Pokémon expert. In the film, Sammy is voiced by Tara Sands in English, and Keiko Toda in Japanese.

Outside of the main series, he appears in multiple episodes of Pokémon Origins, an adaptation of Red and Blue, where he is voiced by Kyle Hebert in English and Katsuji Mori in Japanese. He also appears in the web series Pokémon Evolutions where is voiced by Keith Silverstein or Keiichi Sonobe depending on the dub. Across the different Pokémon manga, Professor Oak has appeared in multiple volumes of Pokémon Adventures; he has also featured in both The Electric Tale of Pikachu and Pokémon Pocket Monsters.

== Critical reception ==
In a 2021 poll ranking the popularity of the series' Pokémon professors, readers of the Japanese website NetLab ranked Professor Oak to be the most popular across the first eight generations, with Oak taking nearly 30% of all votes; readers cited his appearance in the anime for why they voted for him. Crunchyroll News writer Daniel Dockery felt that few characters in anime or video games could match up to Professor Oak in terms of how "consistently lovable" he is. Dockery argued that Oak was a particularly noteworthy figure in the franchise's world, citing both how much the Elite Four seems to vie for his attention as well as how, in Gold and Silver, he believed Oak's appearance detracted from the importance of meeting Mr. Pokémon. Similarly, both Polygon staff and Emily Morrow from Dot Esports describe Oak as being grandfather-like, with the latter noting his status in the series as one of its "most recognizable icons". The New York Times writer Stephanie Strom argued that Professor Oak and Ash Ketchum have the relationship of a sensei and deshi respectively; where the sensei offers "friendship advice and guidance" to the deshi, the deshi responds with "gratitude, respect and loyalty". She also noted that, rather than Oak being responsible for correcting or criticizing Ash, it is Ash's peer group that does. Author Cary Elza described Oak's presence as "one of the show's few true patriarch", noting his character as a balance of both "genius" and "absent-minded". GamesRadar+'s Hirun Cryer commented about the background narrative between Oak and Agatha, describing it as a "bit of a sad story" and was disappointed that the storyline is not going to be depicted in the mainline games. Writing for For The Win, Josh Broadwell noted that the story led to a fan theory which mentioned that the opening battle in Pokémon Red and Blue between Gengar and Nidorino may actually have been depicting a battle between Agatha and Oak. In 2023, fan artist Pokeyugami created an animation depicting the story emulating the watercolor art style of Red and Blue; both Broadwell and Cryer praised the animation, with the latter describing it as a "brilliant new creation".

Upon the reveal of Samson Oak, the character was met with surprise on Japanese social media, with some describing him as regional form of the professor whilst others compared the design to Japanese singer Shigeru Matsuzaki. Author Nicholas Raes discussed how Professor Oak compared to his cousin, Samson Oak. He discussed the "strong resemblance", while noting how Samson's differences, such as his clothing, represented the laid-back nature of Alola. He considered this a revamp akin to the regional differences of some Pokémon in Alola compared to other regions, stating that Samson was "re-tooned" to appear more exotic when compared to Oak.

The Pokémon series has been the subject of multiple rumors, including one that suggests Professor Oak is Ash's father. Kotaku writer Brian Ashcraft speculated that Oak was in a relationship with Ash's mom, noting how often Professor Oak and her are seen together. He also cited a TV special that demonstrated character relationships, noting that it pairs Oak and her together. Another particularly popular rumor suggested that Professor Oak could be battled and would give the player a reward. Prima Games writer Juno Stump remembers that one of the more popular reward rumors being that he would allow the player access to a new secret areas in the game that held stronger Pokémon. On discovering the existence of an official cut battle with Professor Oak, Kotaku writer Patricia Hernandez expressed disappointment, stating that it would have been the perfect way to end Red and Blue. She argued that while defeating the rival may be "cathartic", defeating Oak, who sent the player on the journey in the first place, was a "whole other level of cool". During a livestream of the social experiment Twitch Plays Pokémon in 2015, the cut battle was added into the game using mods, even with added dialogue to acknowledge the Twitch chat.

For the Chicago Bulls' 2023–24 regular-season in September 2023, the team released a schedule video that was themed around Pokémon, designed by the Bulls' digital content and design managers Nikko Tan and Dave Zarzynski. Zarzynski initially created a test run for the video which included the video's intro; the intro is a reference to Professor Oak's introduction, with NBA commissioner Adam Silver appearing to the audience on the screen of a Game Boy as a parody of Oak.
