= I Choose You =

I Choose You may refer to:

- I Choose You (album), a 2004 release by Point of Grace
- "I Choose You" (Keyshia Cole song), a 2013 single by Keyshia Cole
- "I Choose You" (Sara Bareilles song), a 2014 single by Sara Bareilles
- "I Choose You", a 1973 song by Willie Hutch from The Mack soundtrack
- "International Players Anthem (I Choose You)", a 2007 single by UGK
- "I Choose You" (Grey's Anatomy), a 2015 episode of the medical drama series Grey's Anatomy

== See also ==
- "Pokémon, I Choose You!", the pilot episode of the Pokémon anime series
  - Pokémon the Movie: I Choose You!, 20th movie in the series
- "I Choose", song by The Offspring
- "Choose You", song by Stan Walker
