= Poker Smash =

2008 video game

- Developer: Void Star Creations
- Publisher: Void Star Creations
- Platforms: Xbox 360 (XBLA), iPhone OS, Microsoft Windows
- Release: XBLA; February 6, 2008; IOS; July 30, 2010
- Genre: puzzle game
- Modes: Single player, local and online Multiplayer

Poker Smash is a puzzle game developed by American independent software developer Void Star Creations for the Xbox 360's Xbox Live Arcade service and iPhone OS. The title was officially announced during Microsoft's E3 2007 press conference and was released on February 6, 2008. A Microsoft Windows release was announced for 2013, but never happened.

== Gameplay ==
Typical gameplay screenshot

Poker Smash is a puzzle game in which the player is presented with a stack of face cards (10, Jack, Queen, King and Ace) arranged in five columns. The stack constantly rises toward the top of the playfield, with new cards being added at the bottom. The main objective of the game is to line up three or more cards in horizontal or vertical poker hands, such as three-of-a-kind, four-of-a-kind, full house, straight, up to a nine-card flush, and a royal flush. Making a legal hand will cause those cards to clear from the board and any cards above them to fall into the gaps left by the cleared cards. As legal hands are made, the player wins poker chips as his or her score. After each single-player game, the player's winnings are added to a running total (the "bank"), and the player can spend chips from the bank to unlock custom themes, pictures, and puzzle solutions.

The player moves a single cursor around the playfield using the Xbox 360 controller's left analog stick or D-Pad, while the right stick moves the selected card (or blank space) left or right. Moving a card onto an adjacent card causes the two cards to switch positions. The player has a limited allotment of bombs that can be placed on single cards to make them disappear. Bombs are replenished as the game progresses. The player may also temporarily cause the stack to rise faster using the left trigger, and can slow down the game time with the right trigger. The slow-time feature is limited by an energy bar that depletes with use, and recharges slowly when not in use.

Scoring is based on the difficulty of each hand the player creates. Simpler hands are worth a small number of chips, while more complex hands award more chips. Creating multiple hands at once awards a "Shape bonus", and creating a chain of hands increases the player's score multiplier. (Chains are achieved by lining up cards so they form new hands as previous hands clear from the board.) The game also periodically presents the player with "Challenge Hands", giving him or her a limited amount of time to create a specific hand. The challenges vary in difficulty and award increasing amounts of chips as the game progresses.

=== Game modes ===
Poker Smash provides four main modes of single-player play. In Action Mode, the card stack rises continuously and gradually speeds up over the course of the game, and the player keeps playing until the stack hits the top of the playfield. Timed Mode limits game time to three minutes, challenging the player to score as many points as possible in that time. In Puzzle Mode, the player must clear all of the pre-arranged cards from the screen. Cards do not rise in this mode, and the player has an infinite number of moves and infinite time to solve each puzzle. An additional Practice Mode is provided to allow players to learn how to play the game and practice chains – this mode does not save scores or upload statistics to the online leaderboards.

=== Multiplayer ===
In addition to the single-player modes, Poker Smash also provides a local split screen multiplayer mode and an Xbox Live "tournament" mode that supports up to five players simultaneously. In both modes, a limited number of chips is given to each player, and the objective is to win all of the chips from all the other players. As a player creates hands, the value of those hands is deducted evenly from the other players' chip stacks. If a player loses all of his or her chips, that player is eliminated from the game. Each player takes turns being the "dealer", and while a player is the dealer, he or she can drop "garbage blocks" on other players by forming odd-numbered chains (blocks are sent on the player's third, fifth and seventh chains, and so on). To clear a row of garbage, the player must form a legal hand that touches that row – this causes the garbage row to turn into new cards.

The game supports both Ranked and Unranked online matches, with the Ranked mode utilizing the Microsoft TrueSkill ranking system. The game also supports online leaderboards, tracking players' best scores, longest chains and highest TrueSkill ranking, among other statistics.

== Downloadable content ==
Void Star released two downloadable content packs on April 9, 2008, each for 100 Microsoft Points ($1.25 USD):

- Environment Pack: 2 Action Mode Environments
- Puzzle Pack: 15 Puzzles

== History and development ==
Poker Smash is very similar in design to the Puzzle League series. According to its developers, "The idea for Poker Smash grew out of the daily Tetris Attack battles that used to occur in the old Oddworld offices." The game features ten music themes spanning a variety of styles, all composed by David Sease of the band Stretch Arm Strong.

== Reception ==
Reception

Aggregate score
| Aggregator | Score |
|---|---|
| Metacritic | 81% |

Review scores
| Publication | Score |
|---|---|
| Eurogamer | 6/10 |
| GameSpot | 7.5/10 |
| GamesRadar+ | 4.5/5 |
| NZ Gamer | 9/10 |

Official Xbox Magazine awarded Poker Smash a 9.0 of 10, stating "it's one of the best action brain-busters in ages." Team Xbox also gave the game a 9/10.

== Store removal ==
Poker Smash was removed from the Xbox Live Arcade store due to Void Star Creations going out of business.

== See also ==
- Tetris Attack
- Puzzle League (series)
- Xbox Live Arcade
- Poker
