= Tetris Attack =

1995 video game

Tetris Attack Panel de Pon
- North American SNES cover art
- Developer: Intelligent Systems
- Publisher: Nintendo
- Directors: Masao Yamamoto; Hitoshi Yamagami; Toshitaka Muramatsu
- Producer: Gunpei Yokoi
- Programmer: Shinya Yamamoto
- Composers: Masaya Kuzume; Masaru Tajima; Yuka Tsujiyoko
- Series: Puzzle League; Yoshi
- Platforms: Super NES, Game Boy
- Release: Super NES: JP: October 27, 1995; NA: August 1996; EU: November 28, 1996; Game Boy: NA: August 1996; JP: October 26, 1996; EU: November 28, 1996
- Genre: Puzzle
- Modes: Single-player, multiplayer

Tetris Attack, also known as Panel de Pon (Note: Japanese: パネルでポン, Hepburn: Paneru de Pon) in Japan, is a 1995 puzzle video game developed by Intelligent Systems and published by Nintendo for the Super Nintendo Entertainment System. A Game Boy version was released a year later. In the game, the player must arrange matching colored blocks in vertical or horizontal rows to clear them. The blocks steadily rise to the top of the playfield, with new blocks being added at the bottom. Several gameplay modes are present, including a time attack and multiplayer mode.

Tetris Attack was first released as Panel de Pon in Japan in October 1995, featuring fairies as the main characters with a mythical fantasy setting. The game was released outside Japan in 1996, with the original characters and settings replaced by those from Super Mario World 2: Yoshi's Island. Though international releases have the name Tetris Attack, the game bears no relation to the Tetris video game series, leading Tetris Company co-founder Henk Rogers to regret giving Nintendo the license to use the name. Both Panel de Pon and Tetris Attack were later broadcast through the Japan-only Satellaview peripheral, the latter renamed to BS Yoshi's Panepon. (Note: Japanese: ＢＳヨッシーのパネポン, Hepburn: Bī Esu Yosshī no Panepon)

Tetris Attack was well received by critics for its graphical style and presentation, addictive gameplay, challenge and accessibility, and multiplayer modes. It was followed by a series of sequels and remakes for multiple platforms, most of which instead use the name Puzzle League. The game is referenced in other Nintendo games, such as the Super Smash Bros. series, Animal Crossing: New Leaf, and Captain Rainbow.

== Gameplay ==
Lakitu's background in Endless mode. The backgrounds change as the player progresses in Puzzle or Stage Clear mode.

Tetris Attack is a puzzle video game. The player must use an on-screen cursor to arrange colored blocks into horizontal or vertical rows. Matching together three or more blocks of the same color will destroy them. Any blocks above cleared lines will fall, which can be used to cause chain reactions if they touch other matching blocks. The player can also earn combos, clearing more than three blocks in a single move. As the stage progresses, the blocks will begin to rise steadily towards the top of the screen, with new blocks generating from the bottom. Should the blocks touch the top of the playfield, the game will be over.

Several different gameplay modes are included. Story Mode pits the player against a series of computer-controlled opponents. In Endless Mode, the player is challenged to play as long as possible with a continuously rising stack of blocks, which increases in speed over time. Timed Mode challenges the player to score as many points as possible within a two-minute time limit. Stage Clear mode takes the player through a series of stages, in which the objective is to clear all blocks underneath a "boundary" line. In Puzzle Mode, the player must clear all the blocks in a preset block arrangement in a set number of moves. The blocks in this mode do not rise towards the top. Several multiplayer modes are also present with adjustable difficulty levels.

== Development and release ==
Windy's background in Endless Mode. In Tetris Attack, this is changed to Lakitu's background, pictured above.

Tetris Attack was released in Japan on October 27, 1995, in North America in August 1996, and in Europe on November 28, 1996. Development was headed by Intelligent Systems and produced by Gunpei Yokoi, known as the creator of the Game Boy. The Japanese version is titled Panel de Pon, featuring fairies as the main characters with a fantasy setting. International versions instead replace these with characters and settings from Super Mario World 2: Yoshi's Island, a game that was released earlier in 1995. Though international releases have the name Tetris Attack, the game has no relation to the Tetris video game franchise, leading to Tetris Company co-founder Henk Rogers saying in a 2009 interview he regrets giving Nintendo permission to use the name. Although Rogers liked the game, he believed it "got lost in history" due to it using the Tetris branding.

A Game Boy version of Tetris Attack was released in 1996. Two years later, in 1998, a special version of Panel de Pon was broadcast through the Satellaview peripheral for the Super Famicom in Japan, renamed BS Panel de Pon – Event '98 as part of a contest by St. GIGA. Tetris Attack was later released for the Satellaview the same year, renamed BS Yoshi no Panepon. The original Panel de Pon was digitally re-released for the Japanese Wii Virtual Console on November 27, 2007. It was later added to the Nintendo Classics service on May 20, 2020.

== Reception ==
Reception

Review scores
Publication	Score
AllGame	4.5/5 (SNES)
Electronic Gaming Monthly	8.25/10 (SNES)
Famitsu	7/10, 7/10, 8/10, 7/10
Honest Gamers	9/10 (SNES)

Tetris Attack was met with extremely positive reviews, earning a 90% average rating on GameRankings. The four reviewers of Electronic Gaming Monthly gave it an 8.25 out of 10, commending the addictive gameplay, colorful and cartoony graphics, use of Mario characters in the North American localization, and two-player mode. GamePro gave it a perfect 5 out of 5 in graphics, control and FunFactor, and a 4.5 out of 5 in sound. The reviewer described it as "a gentler, slower style of gameplay that requires learning some easy new controls, but this game's no less addicting than the original Tetris." GameSpot called it "absolutely brilliant".

GamePro gave the Game Boy version a brief positive review, saying it "updates the age-old Tetris concept by inverting the basic action".

=== Accolades ===
Electronic Gaming Monthly editors named Tetris Attack Super NES Game of the Year, Hand-Held Game of the Year, and Puzzle Game of the Year, commenting that "[T]he simple premise makes it a game of mass appeal; its depth makes it a hardcore gamer's delight." In 1997, Electronic Gaming Monthly editors ranked the Super NES version the 16th best console video game of all time. They cited its accessibility and addictive quality, admitting that their boss had confiscated the office copy of the game because of how much time they spent playing it. GamesRadar+ listed it 87th on their list of "The 100 best games of all time", saying "you haven't lived until you've played Tetris Attack two-player and dropped an immensely satisfying five-line garbage block on your opponent." Game Informer featured it on its own best games of all-time list at 96 and called it one of the most addictive puzzle games ever made. In 2018, Complex listed the game #64 on its "The Best Super Nintendo Games of All Time".

== Legacy ==
Tetris Attack was followed by several sequel games, most using the name Puzzle League in western territories. The first of these were Pokémon Puzzle Challenge for the Game Boy Color and Pokémon Puzzle League for the Nintendo 64 in 2000, featuring characters from the Pokémon franchise. A previously unreleased sequel, Panel de Pon 64, was later released as part of Nintendo Puzzle Collection for the GameCube in 2003. It was followed by Dr. Mario & Puzzle League for the Game Boy Advance in 2005 and Planet Puzzle League was released for the Nintendo DS in 2007 (renamed to Panel de Pon DS in Japan and Puzzle League DS in Europe), featuring online multiplayer support via the now-defunct Nintendo Wi-Fi Connection service and touch-screen controls. These follow-ups are not tied to any external franchise. A condensed version of the game for DSiWare, Puzzle League Express, was released in 2010 for the Nintendo DSi with many of the same features as Planet.

Several Nintendo games reference Tetris Attack and Panel de Pon. The "Lip's Stick", the primary weapon of the main character of Panel de Pon, appears throughout the Super Smash Bros. series since Super Smash Bros. Melee, poisoning the opponent. Super Smash Bros. Brawl features multiple Panel de Pon 64 characters and a red-colored block as collectible stickers. A remix of Lip's theme song appears in multiple series entries, starting with Brawl, where it can be played on the stage PictoChat in Brawl, Wrecking Crew in Super Smash Bros. for Wii U, and on any miscellaneous Nintendo series stage in Super Smash Bros. Ultimate. Lip appears in the Japan-only Wii game Captain Rainbow and as a Spirit and Mii Fighter costume in Super Smash Bros. Ultimate. A 2016 update to Animal Crossing: New Leaf adds a minigame based on the Puzzle League series, titled Animal Crossing Puzzle League.

Panel de Pon was included solely in Japan as part of the 21 games rereleased on the Super Famicom Mini on October 5, 2017, and was made available internationally on the Nintendo Classics service on May 20, 2020.

== See also ==
- Wario's Woods
