= Planet Puzzle League =

2007 video game

- North American box art
- Developer: Intelligent Systems
- Publisher: Nintendo
- Directors: Osamu Yamauchi; Masaki Tawara
- Producers: Toshio Sengoku; Hitoshi Yamagami
- Designers: Eiko Hirao; Sachiko Shima
- Programmer: Toshihiro Nishii
- Artists: Ryo Koizumi; Takashi Ito; Yasuo Inoue
- Composer: Masanobu Matsunaga
- Series: Puzzle League
- Platform: Nintendo DS
- Release: JP: April 26, 2007; NA: June 4, 2007; EU: June 29, 2007
- Genre: Puzzle
- Modes: Single player, multiplayer

Planet Puzzle League, known as Puzzle League DS in Europe and Panel de Pon DS (Note: Japanese: パネルでポンDS) in Japan, is a 2007 puzzle video game developed by Intelligent Systems and published by Nintendo for the Nintendo DS. It is an installment of the Puzzle League series. It was released under part of the Touch! Generations brand in Japan and North America. The game was released in Japan on April 26, 2007 in North America on June 4, 2007, and in Europe on June 29, 2007.

== Gameplay ==
In Planet Puzzle League, identically-sized square blocks (panels) of various colors are stacked in a two-dimensional well 6 spaces wide, of which the active on-screen playfield is 12 spaces tall. The blocks in the stack align according to an invisible grid, such that the blocks occupy distinct rows and columns.

Planet Puzzle League, by default, is played with the Nintendo DS unit in a sideways "book-style" orientation, which allows the vertically oriented playfield and its blocks to be displayed larger, making it better-suited for touch-screen gameplay. The game can also be played in the standard Nintendo DS orientation, for button positioning that is suited for traditional button-based gameplay. Either control method can be used, regardless of orientation. The game can be configured for either left-handed or right-handed play.

When using touchscreen control, blocks can be dragged horizontally with the stylus. In this control scheme, a move occurs as a block is dragged from one grid space into an adjacent grid space, during which a two-space horizontal cursor is repositioned, framing both grid spaces. As a block is dragged into a space occupied by another block; the other block is swapped into the space vacated by the dragged block. For computer-controlled players and when using traditional button-based control, the cursor is navigated along the playfield to select spaces to swap, in which a move occurs when blocks are repositioned in a swap. Players move the cursor using the D-pad and perform swaps using the A or B action button.

=== Clearing ===
When blocks of the same color are aligned adjacent to one another in vertical or horizontal lines of three or more while supported from underneath, the blocks are cleared, "exploding" (disappearing) from the playing field one by one, from left to right, top to bottom. When more than three blocks are cleared at the same moment, the event is known as a combo. Combos are measured by the number of blocks cleared, with a clear of six blocks referred to as a "+6" combo. Once all the blocks in a clear or combo have disappeared, the blocks that were resting atop the cleared blocks drop down.

When blocks that drop down as a result of a clear result in another clear upon landing, the clears are linked together in a chain. Chains are measured by the number of clears in the chain, with a chain of three clears referred to as an "x3" or "triple" chain. When the blocks for a chain are actively moved into position while the blocks in a cleared line are exploding, the resultant chain is referred to as an active chain. In some modes, hints for performing active chains are occasionally provided in the form of an arrow indicating a particular move to perform.

=== Lift ===
In all gameplay modes except Puzzle modes, the stack of blocks lifts (rises) up from the bottom of the screen. As the match progresses, the stack rises at an accelerating rate. In these modes, players have the ability to manually lift the stack by using a Lift button. For touch control, the Lift button is a touch-screen area located to the side of the playfield. For button control, a shoulder button is used for the Lift button. If a player's stack is in a state of rising while at or beyond the top edge of their playing field, the player loses the match.

The lift of the stack stops while blocks are exploding. If a combo or chain is performed, a stop occurs, in which the rising of the stack will remain stopped for a short time after the clear. The duration of the stop depends on level of combo or chain that was performed, as well as the height of the stack, decreasing as the match progresses. Lifting the stack manually during a stop overrides it and resumes natural lifting speed.

=== Garbage ===
In several modes of play, rectangular garbage of various widths and heights can drop from above the playing field to add to the stack. When a block is cleared while touching a piece of garbage, the garbage piece and all same-colored garbage pieces contiguous with it are transformed as a group, space by space from right to left, row by row from bottom to top. In the transformation, the bottommost layer of each piece of garbage is turned into blocks. The rising of the stack is stopped during the transformation of garbage. Until the entire transformation event is completed for the entire group, the newly formed blocks still behave as part of the garbage, and cannot be moved or used in a clear. Once the transformation event is completed the newly formed blocks move, fall and clear as normal.

In Vs. modes, garbage can be sent to the opponent(s) by clearing surprise blocks (chrome blocks with exclamation marks) or performing combos or chains. The garbage pieces are produced according to the table:

Garbage blocks (height × width [quantity])
Level	x2	x3	x4	x5	x6	x7	x8	x9	x10	x11	x12	x13	x14
Combo			1×3	1×4	1×5	1×6	1×3, 1×4	1×4, 1×5	1×5 (2)	1×6 (2)			
Surprise block clear		1×6	1×6 (2), 1×3	1×6 (3), 1×4	1×6 (4), 1×5	1×6 (6)							
Chain	1×6	2×6	3×6	4×6	5×6	6×6	7×6	8×6	9×6	10×6	11×6	12×6	13×6

For a chain, the garbage piece produced spans the whole width of the playfield, with a height of one less than the chain level.

=== Item blocks ===
A new addition to the Puzzle League series, item blocks are special blocks that are optionally available in Garbage Battle matches, which cause certain effects when cleared. While the item is in effect, the item block is displayed to the right of the playfield of the affected player, scrolling up from the bottom of the screen, with the effect wearing off when the item scrolls past the top of the screen.

- Fever blocks, indicated by a flame symbol, cause all the player's clears during a fixed period of time to be chained together.
- Tri-Color blocks, indicated by a symbol of three squares, cause the variety of colored blocks in a player's playfield to be reduced to three colors for a fixed amount of time: red, blue, and green.
- Reflect blocks, indicated by a symbol of an upward-pointing arrow with a bar on top, cause a player's garbage to be sent to the opponent.
- Twitch blocks, indicated by a symbol of circular arrows, cause the opponent's playing field to shake, changing the blocks' colors constantly.
- Paralyze blocks, indicated by jagged line symbol, cause a row of blocks in an opponent's playfield to become inaccessible for moves for a fixed period of time.
- Fog blocks, indicated by an "X" symbol, change some of an opponent's blocks into un-clearable gray blocks for a fixed period of time.

== Game modes ==
=== Single-player ===
Planet Puzzle League features several different gameplay modes:

- Endless: With no time limit, players attempt to score as high as possible before losing.
- Clear: The players progress through various stages in which the player must clear the space above a certain Clear marker. The mode is organized in five-stage levels, each featuring a different theme, in which the fifth stage of each level is a "boss battle" in which the player must empty an opposing life bar by scoring points.
- Garbage Challenge: Garbage blocks drop onto the stack during play. Similar to "Endless" mode, the game continues until the player loses.

==== Vs. COM ====
In Vs. COM modes, competitive matches are played against a computer-controlled (CPU) opponent. There are several Vs. COM modes available for playing:

- Garbage Battle: The classic Vs. mode, in which the player must compete to outlast the opponent; garbage blocks can be sent to the opponent to hinder them.
- Score Battle: The player competes to get the highest score in two minutes.
- Clear Battle: The player competes to clear the space above the Clear marker before their opponent.

==== Time Attack ====
In Time Attack modes, the goal is to score as high as possible in 2 minutes. There are several Time Attack modes:

- Score Attack: Uses standard scoring, in which points can be earned in a variety of ways. Score Attack matches can be auto-recorded, in which the most recent matches can be played back as video in the Movies menu. There are 12 slots for movies, with each recorded movie featuring a setting to approve or restrict it from being overwritten by a new auto-recordings. Players can also select one movie to be automatically sent to other players during multiplayer matches.
- Garbage Attack: The score is accumulated by transforming garbage blocks.
- Lift Attack: The match is scored by how much the Lift button is used.

==== Puzzle ====
In Puzzle modes, different puzzle scenarios are presented for which there are only a limited set of solutions. In some modes, a "hint" button is available which provides a solution hint when pressed. Each Puzzle mode features six ten-stage levels. There are two standard Puzzle modes. In each, progress is saved with the clearing of each separate stage.

- Basic Puzzles: Each stage features a particular arrangement of blocks which must be completely cleared, for which the player is allowed only a limited number of moves.
- Advanced Puzzles: Unlocked when all Basic Puzzles are cleared. Advanced Puzzles play similarly, but with higher difficulty.

In addition, there are two new Puzzle modes. In these modes, progress is only saved upon the completion of the entire level.

- Active Puzzles: As in the standard Puzzle modes, the puzzles feature particular arrangements of blocks which must be fully cleared; but there is no limitation on the number of moves, all the blocks must be cleared in a single un-broken chain, and the hint button cannot be used.
- Mission: In Mission mode, each stage features a different objective.

==== Daily Play ====
In Daily Play, players can play special Time Attack challenges once per day, for which the scores are recorded in a graph displaying performance over time.

=== Multiplayer ===
==== Wi-Fi Battle ====
Two-player Vs. matches can be played over the internet using the Nintendo Wi-Fi Connection. Players can be matched with opponents according to several different modes:

- Free Play Battle: Players are matched at random; matches in this mode do not influence competitive ranking.
- Novice Battle: Intended for novice players, this mode becomes unavailable after certain skill conditions are satisfied,
- Friend Battle: Players can choose opponents from among connected players whose friend codes have been registered. Up to 60 friend codes can be registered. In-game voice chat is available for players who have mutually selected the "voice chat on" option. Item blocks are only available in Wi-Fi matches in this mode.
- Birthday Battle: Players are matched based on win/loss data recorded for matches played in this mode. Players are ranked against other players with the same birthday according to the number of Birthday Battle matches won during the current ranking cycle. Rankings are reset every week, with a counter indicating the number of days left until the next cycle.

==== DS Wireless Play ====
Multiplayer Vs. matches of up to four players can be played over local wireless connections through either Multi-Card Play or Single-Card Download Play. Competing with other players through DS Wireless Play automatically registers them in the player's Friend Roster.

- In Garbage Battle matches, garbage and item effects are sent to all opponents. players are ranked in reverse order of elimination.
- In Clear Battle matches, players are ranked by completion time from shortest to longest.
- In Score Battle matches, players are ranked by score from highest to lowest.

Players whose games have ended through either elimination or completion can continue to play until the match is finished for all competitors.

== DSiWare release ==
A condensed adaptation titled Puzzle League Express, known as A Little Bit of... Puzzle League in PAL regions and as A Little Panel de Pon DS (Note: Japanese: ちょっとパネルでポン, Hepburn: Chotto Panel de Pon) in Japan, was released for the Nintendo DSi's DSiWare download service. It consists of four single-player modes: Endless, Clear, Score Attack, and Vs. COM. The game was released in Japan on January 29, 2009, in the PAL regions on July 17, 2009, and in North America on August 31, 2009.

== Reception ==
Reception

Aggregate score
Aggregator	Score
Metacritic	86/100

Review scores
Publication	Score
Destructoid	9/10
Nintendo World Report	9.5/10

GameSpot gave Planet Puzzle League a 7.5 out of 10 praising its mind-bending puzzles, curious combo mechanics and great online options. It also stated that "Even though the game itself is far from puzzle-perfect, Planet Puzzle League is a fun title with enough worthy challenges to warrant playing. Its weird, paradoxical combo scheme keeps it from approaching the greatness of games like Lumines, Tetris, or Super Puzzle Fighter, but if you're looking for a new way to flex your brain and test your reflexes, this piece is a solid fit." Craig Harris of IGN gave a game a 9 out of 10 score saying that "The last time I played the fun and addictive Puzzle League design was in the extremely watered down Dr. Mario/Puzzle League cartridge released on the Game Boy Advance a couple years back. Intelligent Systems really went to town in this Nintendo DS version -- it's an excellent retooling of a very addictive puzzle game."

== See also ==
- Poker Smash, a similar game with a poker theme
