= Nintendo Puzzle Collection =

2003 video game

- Japanese cover art
- Developer: Intelligent Systems (Note: Additional work by Nintendo Software Technology)
- Publisher: Nintendo
- Director: Hitoshi Yamagami
- Producers: Takehiro Izushi; Ryoichi Kitanishi
- Designers: Yumiko Morisada; Naoko Mori
- Composers: Masanobu Matsunaga; Noritaka Misawa; Yoshito Hirano
- Platform: GameCube
- Release: JP: February 7, 2003
- Genre: Puzzle
- Modes: Single-player, multiplayer

Nintendo Puzzle Collection (Note: Japanese: ニンテンドーパズルコレクション, Hepburn: Nintendō Pazuru Korekushon) is a 2003 video game compilation developed by Intelligent Systems and published by Nintendo for the GameCube. It was released only in Japan. It includes updated versions of three Nintendo-published puzzle video games released for older systems — Yoshi's Cookie (1992), Panel de Pon (1995), and Dr. Mario 64 (2001) — featuring updated graphics and music, alongside four-person multiplayer. The player can download one of the games to their Game Boy Advance via the GameCube – Game Boy Advance link cable.

Development was done by Intelligent Systems, with subsidiary Nintendo Software Technology assisting with the Panel de Pon portion of the game. Originally titled Masterpiece Puzzle Collection in early versions, the game was made to appeal towards women with the inclusion of Panel de Pon, leading to Nintendo using Japanese actress Asami Abe to promote the game through television commercials. A playable demo was presented at E3 2003 and slated for a release in North America and Europe, but was never released for unknown reasons.

Import reviews of Nintendo Puzzle Collection were favorable, being praised for its multiplayer and presentation, with several labeling Yoshi's Cookie and Panel de Pon as the best titles.

== Gameplay ==
Nintendo Puzzle Collection is a compilation of three Nintendo-published puzzle games that were originally released on earlier Nintendo consoles. All the games support both single-player gameplay and competitive local multiplayer for up to four players simultaneously. In addition, Nintendo Puzzle Collection supports GameCube-Game Boy Advance connectivity, allowing the player to use a Game Boy Advance as a game controller. Downgraded versions of each game can also be downloaded and played independently on the Game Boy Advance. Each game is stored in the Game Boy Advance memory and will remain until the handheld is shut down.

=== Dr. Mario ===
Dr. Mario (Note: Japanese: Dr.マリオ) is a port of Dr. Mario 64 (2001), originally released for the Nintendo 64, which was not previously released in Japan. Like all Dr. Mario games, the gameplay focuses on eliminating colored viruses from the playing field by matching them with colored capsules.

Dr. Mario was directed by Hitoshi Yamagami and Yoshiyuki Kato and the music was composed by Manabu Fujiki and Seiichi Tokunaga. The downloadable Game Boy Advance version is an emulation of the Nintendo Entertainment System version of Dr. Mario.

=== Yoshi's Cookie ===
Yoshi's Cookie (Note: Japanese: ヨッシーのクッキー, Hepburn: Yosshī no Kukkī) is an update to the 1992 video game of the same name, originally released on the Nintendo Entertainment System, Super Nintendo Entertainment System, Super Famicom, and Game Boy consoles. Gameplay focuses on creating rows and columns of matching cookie types in order to clear them from the play field. In addition to the original mode, this version also features a full story mode.

Yoshi's Cookie was directed by Yasuhiro Minamimoto and Azusa Tajima, and the music (based on the original Yoshi's Cookie soundtrack) was arranged by Ai Yamashita. The downloadable Game Boy Advance version is an emulation of the NES version of Yoshi's Cookie.

=== Panel de Pon ===
Panel de Pon (Note: Japanese: パネルでポン, Hepburn: Paneru de Pon) is a sequel to the Super Famicom game of the same name, which was rebranded as Tetris Attack (1995) outside Japan. The game follows the descendants of the original Panel de Pon characters in a new story. Gameplay focuses on swapping horizontally adjacent colored blocks to create lines of three or more and remove them from the play field. It is based on a Nintendo 64 version that went unreleased in Japan, but was modified and released internationally as Pokémon Puzzle League (2000); as a result, many of its features and puzzles are identical to those included in Pokémon Puzzle League.

Panel de Pon was directed by Hitoshi Yamagami and Yukimi Shimura and the music (based on the original soundtrack) was arranged by Masaru Tajima.

== Development and release ==
Nintendo Puzzle Collection was released for the GameCube in Japan on February 7, 2003. Development of the game was by Intelligent Systems, who prior to which had designed the original Panel de Pon for the Super Famicom, with Nintendo Software Technology assisting with the Panel de Pon portion of the game. Announced in December 2002 under the title Masterpiece Puzzle Collection, the game was made to appeal to women with the inclusion of Panel de Pon, with Nintendo using Japanese actress Asami Abe to help promote the game in television commercials — she had practiced the Famicom version of Dr. Mario before shooting. The collection itself was made to re-release the included titles due to most not being available to consumers anymore at the time, and to take advantage of the GameCube – Game Boy Advance link cable peripheral.

In January 2003, a tournament for the game was held at the 17th Next Generation World Hobby Fair in Osaka, where contestants had to get the highest score possible in all three games under a set time limit. A playable demo, under the finalized name Nintendo Puzzle Collection, was presented at the 2003 Electronic Entertainment Expo (E3) event, slated for a future release in both North America and Europe, but the game was ultimately never released outside of Japan.

== Reception ==
Reception

Aggregate score
Aggregator	Score
GameRankings	75%

Review score
Publication	Score
Nintendo World Report	8/10

Due to the game's Japan-exclusive release, reception of Nintendo Puzzle Collection is limited. The game holds an aggregate score of 75% on GameRankings based on two reviews. Michael Cole of Nintendo World Report, reviewing an imported copy, scored Nintendo Puzzle Collection 8 out of 10. Cole felt that Dr. Mario was the weakest selection of the three games available, with "uninspired" graphics and "unforgiving and honestly quite frustrating" gameplay. He remarked that while Panel de Pon was the best selection in regards to gameplay, Yoshi's Cookie had the most beautiful graphics.
