= Pokémon Puzzle League =

2000 puzzle game for the Nintendo 64

- North American box art
- Developers: Nintendo Software Technology; Intelligent Systems
- Publisher: Nintendo
- Director: Yukimi Shimura
- Producers: Yukimi Shimura; Takehiro Izushi
- Designers: Bill Giese; Brett Ballow; A.J. Redmer
- Programmers: Stephen Lee; Robert Champagne; Yoon Joon Lee
- Artists: Mike Harrington; Raymond Yan
- Composers: John Siegler; Marry Corallo; Louis Cortellezi; Ken Cummings; Neil Jason; Michael Whalen; Ralph Schuckett; Brian Steckler; Lawrence Schwedler
- Series: Puzzle League; Pokémon
- Platform: Nintendo 64
- Release: NA: September 25, 2000; EU: March 2, 2001
- Genre: Puzzle
- Modes: Single-player; multiplayer

Pokémon Puzzle League is a puzzle video game in the Puzzle League series developed by Nintendo Software Technology and published by Nintendo for the Nintendo 64. Released in North America on September 25, 2000, and in Europe on March 2, 2001, its Puzzle League-based gameplay has a focus on puzzle-based strategy in the game's grid-based format. To advance to new levels, players are required to combat the game's trainers and gym leaders, similar to the ones featured in Pokémon Red, Blue, and Yellow. One of several games based on the Pokémon anime, it features lead protagonist Ash Ketchum, his Pikachu, his companions Brock and Misty, the Kanto Gym Leaders, and other characters from the series.

Pokémon Puzzle League received mostly positive reviews from critics. Pokémon Puzzle Challenge, a companion puzzle game, was released for the Game Boy Color in 2000. Re-releases of the game followed in 2008 for the Wii via Virtual Console, and in 2022 on the Nintendo Classics service.

== Gameplay ==
Series protagonist Ash Ketchum and his Pikachu battle rival Gary Oak and his Growlithe.

Pokémon Puzzle League features the same gameplay as in Panel de Pon. The objective is to clear blocks from the playfield by arranging them in horizontal or vertical lines of three or more blocks. A continuous stream of new blocks pushes up from the bottom of the playfield, causing the entire playfield to rise continuously. If the blocks reach the top of the playfield, the player loses. The player can temporarily stop the progression of blocks by scoring combos and chains, and in two-player battles, these actions also cause garbage blocks to stack on top of the opponent's playfield.

Unlike its predecessors, Pokémon Puzzle League features a 3D mode in addition to the traditional 2D mode. In this mode, gameplay takes place on a cylinder with an effective width of 18 blocks, compared to the six-block width of the flat 2D field. It also features the original block design from Panel de Pon and Tetris Attack, as well as a Pokémon-oriented design (selected by default). The game features the ability to battle against AI opponents, though their abilities are limited when using the 3D gameplay style.

The game includes several modes of play. In "1P Stadium", players control Ash Ketchum as they compete to defeat a series of increasingly difficult opponents and become the Puzzle Master. "2P Stadium" allows two players to choose one of 15 Pokémon trainers to play as, and battle one another using different gameplay rulesets. Other game types include "Marathon", which challenges players to continue playing as long as possible before the blocks fill the screen; "Time Zone", in which players attempt to achieve the highest score possible within a two minute time limit; "Spa Service", a stage-based mode where the player must clear a target number of lines to advance to the next stage; and "Puzzle University", a puzzle mode where players must clear predetermined block configurations within a limited number of moves. The game also includes modes designed to teach newer players, including "Professor Oak's Lab", in which Professor Oak provides several tutorials on how to play; and "Mimic Mansion", a training arena hosted by Tracey Sketchit that demonstrates techniques and allows players to practice.

=== Characters ===
The 16 playable characters in Pokémon Puzzle League are directly taken from the Pokémon anime, including characters that originally debuted in previous Pokémon games, such as Misty, Brock, and Giovanni. Ash Ketchum is the only playable character in the 1P Stadium mode, whereas other characters are available in the 2P Stadium mode. Ash's rival Gary Oak's Pokémon, a Nidoran♀, Growlithe, and Krabby, appear fully evolved into Nidoqueen, Arcanine, and Kingler when playing 1P Stadium on Hard difficulty or higher, although these evolved forms are not available when playing as Gary in 2P Stadium. The game's difficulty setting determines who the player faces as the final opponent: Giovanni in Easy mode, Bruno in Normal mode, Gary in Hard mode, and Mewtwo in Very Hard and Super Hard modes, which upon his defeat rewards the player with a different ending scene.

In addition to Ash, characters playable in the 2P Stadium mode include the eight Kanto Gym Leaders; Orange Islands companion Tracey Sketchit; perpetual villains Jessie, James, and Meowth of Team Rocket; rivals Gary Oak and Ritchie; Elite Four trainers Lorelei and Bruno; and Mewtwo, who uses cloned Pokémon. (Note: Mewtwo is temporarily unlockable in 2P Stadium via cheat code, although only his clone Pikachu is playable in this mode.) Each character has a unique set of three Pokémon to battle with and a specific theme music; these differences are purely cosmetic and do not affect gameplay. Non-playable characters include Professor Oak, who provides tutorial information to the player; Nurse Joy, who hosts the game's "Pokemon Center" options menu; and less-seen Team Rocket members Butch and Cassidy, who appear as special opponents in the Spa Service mode.

== Plot ==
Ash and Pikachu are on vacation when they are called on the phone by Professor Oak, who tells Ash he has been selected as one of the challengers for the official Puzzle League Tournament. Ash races off excitedly with Pikachu to the nearby Pokémon Puzzle League Village.

During the tournament, Ash challenges Gary, his first rival, before defeating seven of the eight of the Kanto region gym leaders and earning their badges, learning from them of a legendary undefeated competitor known as the Puzzle Master. After battling Tracey and Team Rocket, Ash challenges the supposed Puzzle Master, Giovanni, and defeats him to win the last badge. Soon after, he defeats the Elite Four, including the current Puzzle League Champion, Gary.

Upon Gary's defeat, Ash is named the new champion and presented with a trophy, which immediately warps him into a final challenge with the true Puzzle Master, Mewtwo. After defeating Mewtwo, Ash is warped back to his vacation spot. Ash initially believes the experience to be a dream, until he discovers a Pokémon Puzzle Master trophy awarded to him by Mewtwo.

== Development ==
Pokémon Puzzle League originally began development as Panel de Pon 64, a sequel to the Super Nintendo Entertainment System game Panel de Pon (1995) featuring the descendants of that game's cast, before being reskinned to feature characters from the Pokémon franchise. The original Panel de Pon 64 version would later be completed and released as part of Nintendo Puzzle Collection (2003) for GameCube.

The in-game soundtrack is primarily composed of instrumental arrangements of tracks from the 1999 soundtrack album Pokémon 2.B.A. Master. Other featured tracks include an arrangement of "Catch Me If You Can" from Pokémon: The First Movie's short feature Pikachu's Vacation, and other instrumental tracks from the Pokémon anime. The game also features animated full-motion video cutscenes, along with voice acting by the cast of the anime series.

== Reception ==
Reception

Aggregate scores
Aggregator	Score
GameRankings	82.65%
Metacritic	81/100

Review scores
Publication	Score
AllGame	4/5
CNET Gamecenter	8/10
Electronic Gaming Monthly	9.17/10 (Note: In Electronic Gaming Monthly's review of the game, two critics gave it each a score of 9/10, and the other gave it 9.5/10.)
EP Daily	7/10
Eurogamer	(Wii) 8/10
Game Informer	8.5/10
GameRevolution	B
GameSpot	7/10
Hyper	88%
IGN	8.9/10
N64 Magazine	89%
Next Generation	4/5
Nintendo Life	8/10
Nintendo Power	8.1/10

Pokémon Puzzle League received "generally favourable reviews", according to review aggregator website Metacritic. Fran Mirabella III of IGN said, "I'm totally addicted and thrilled with Pokémon Puzzle League." Blake Fischer of NextGen called it "a surprisingly fun experience, if a little on the cute side. It may not be up to Puzzle Fighter 2 Turbo [sic] standards, but it's one of the best puzzlers on N64." Miss Spell of GamePro said the game "is designed for young gamers, encouraging creative puzzle-solving—something parents will love. Older puzzle fans who have a high Jigglypuff tolerance will also enjoy this well-structured offering." (Note: GamePro gave the game two 4.5/5 scores for graphics and fun factor, 3.5/5 for sound, and 5/5 for control in one review.) In another GamePro review, Human Tornado said, "Even though it's yet another take on Tetris, Pokemon Puzzle League has enough game modes to give it extra depth, and learning the art of advanced chains and combos will take a long time. Pokemon and puzzle game fans will appreciate this fun and challenging N64 game." (Note: GamePro gave the game two 4/5 scores for graphics and fun factor, 3.5/5 for sound, and 4.5/5 for control in another review.)

The game was nominated for the "Best Console Puzzle Game" award at The Electric Playground's Blister Awards 2000, which went to Mr. Driller.
