= Shiori Sato =

Japanese model (born 1990)

- 佐藤 栞里
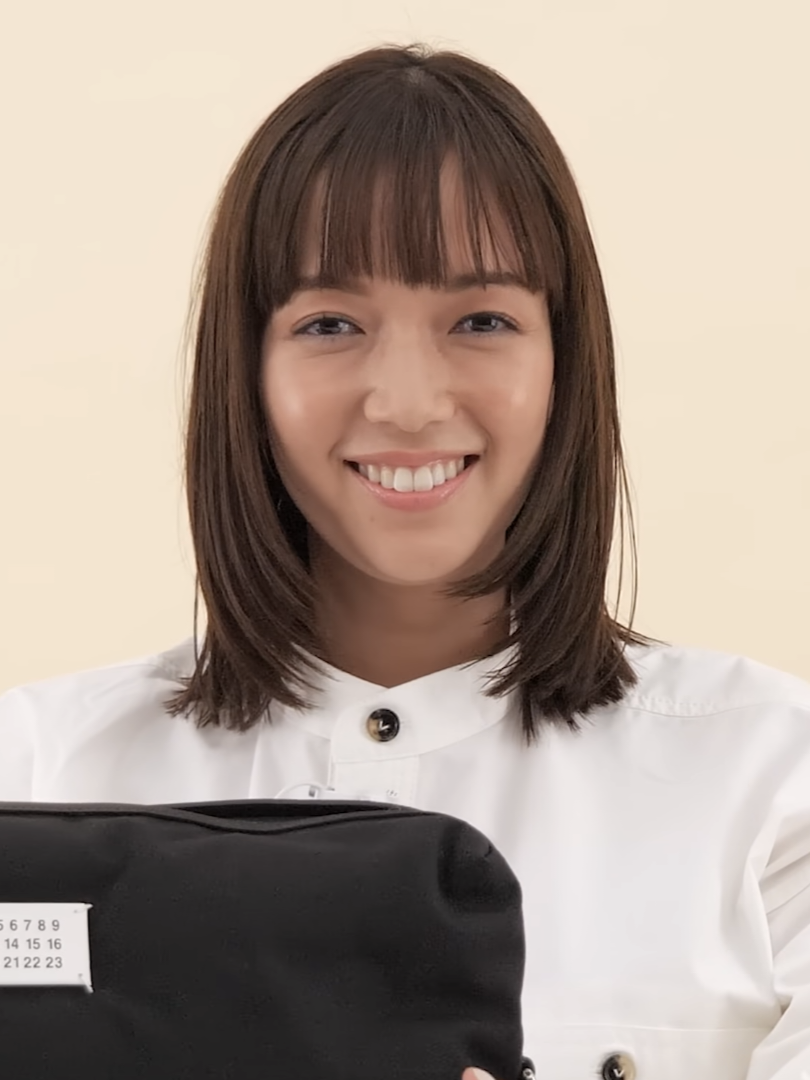
- Born: July 27, 1990 (age 36); Saitama Prefecture, Japan
- Occupation: Model
- Years active: 2001 - present
- Agent: Stardust Promotion
- Height: 1.68 m (5 ft 6 in) (2012)

Shiori Sato (佐藤 栞里, Satō Shiori; born July 27, 1990 in Saitama Prefecture, Japan) is a Japanese model represented by the talent agency Stardust Promotion.

== Filmography ==
=== TV series ===
Year	Title	Network	Notes
2009	Sakiyomi Jum-Bang!	TV Tokyo	Regular appearances
2010	Non-no TV	BS-TBS	
2011	Mirukuchapon	TBS	
2014	1 Oku-ri no Dai Shitsumon!? Warattekoraete!	NTV	
2015	More Happy TV	BS-TBS	MC
2015	Music Load	BS11	Assistant MC
2015	The Risk	Fuji TV	
2015	The Most Useful School in the World	NTV	
2015	Ariyoshi no Kabe II	NTV	Assistant MC
2015	Uwa! Damasareta Taishou	NTV	Regular appearances
2018	King's Brunch	TBS	Co-host

=== Magazines ===
Year	Title	Notes
2001	Pichi Lemon	Exclusive model
2008	Pinky	Exclusive model
2009	Weekly Shōnen Jump	
2010-2012	Non-no	Exclusive model
2012	More	
2012	Mini	
2012	Sweet	
2012	Biteki	
2012	Oggi	
2012	Maquia	
2015	25ans	

=== Advertisements ===
Year	Title	Notes
2013	Biteki	
2015	Sprite	

=== Radio series ===
Year	Title	Network	Notes
2012	Nihon Daigaku Million Life	FM Nack5	
2012	Nihon Daigaku Medical College	FM Nack5	

=== Film ===
Year	Title	Role	Notes	Ref.
2023	Tokyo MER: Mobile Emergency Room – The Movie			
2025	Unforgettable			

=== Anime Film ===
Year	Title	Character	Notes	Ref.
2017	Pokémon the Movie: I Choose You!	Verity		
