= Asami Abe =

Japanese singer and actress

Asami Abe 安倍 麻美
- Born: February 27, 1985 (age 41); Muroran, Hokkaido, Japan
- Genres: J-pop
- Occupations: Singer, actress
- Years active: 2003–2011
- Label: Universal Music Group

Asami Abe (安倍 麻美, Abe Asami; born February 27, 1985) is a former Japanese singer and actress, also known as the younger sister of Japanese singer and actress Natsumi Abe. She started her career doing commercials for Nintendo Puzzle Collection, and she has also appeared in a few TV dramas.

== Biography ==
Following in her sister's footsteps, Abe hit the music scene in 2003 and has achieved some success. Her debut single was "Riyū" which was released in June of that year. To date she has released a total of six singles, one novel, two full albums, three photobooks, and has also starred in three movies and two TV dramas.

In 2006, Abe and older sister Natsumi played the title roles in a Japanese TV drama about the 60's Japanese female pop duo The Peanuts. She also played the role of Chava in the Japanese production of Fiddler on the Roof.

On May 15, 2007, it was announced that Abe would replace Nozomi Tsuji in the trio Gyaruru. They released their first single, "Boom Boom Meccha Maccho!", on June 20, 2007.

On September 5, 2007, Abe participated in Kunoichi, a women's obstacle course competition, and was disqualified on the first stage.

== Personal life ==
On November 11, 2011, it was announced that Abe married a 34-year-old content creator who mainly deals with online contents.

== Discography ==
=== Singles ===
1. 2003-06-26 – "Riyū" (理由)
2. 2003-07-02 – "Our Song"
3. 2003-10-08 – "Kimi o Tsureteiku" (きみをつれていく)
4. 2004-01-28 – "Sotsugyō" (卒業, Graduation)
5. 2004-08-04 – "Jōnetsu Setsuna" (情熱セツナ) - used as Rockman X Command Mission's opening theme.
6. 2004-11-03 – "Everyday"

=== Albums ===
1. 2003-11-05 – Wishes
2. 2004-12-01 – 4 colors

=== DVDs ===
1. 2003-12-17 – A Girl ~I Wish Upon a Song~
2. 2004-04-07 – Asamix!
3. 2004-12-01 – Sweet Heaven

== Appearances ==
=== Photobooks ===
1. 2003-07-09 – Sono Mama (そのまま。)
2. 2004-10-24 – Four Colors
3. 2005-11-24 – Feeling Good?

=== Novel ===
1. 2005-11-24 – Baka Mitai (バカみたい。)

=== Dramas ===
1. 2004-07-08 – Minami-kun no Koibito (南くんの恋人, Minami-kun's Lover)
2. 2004-08-21 – Chichi no Umi, Boku no Sora (父の海、僕の空)
3. 2004-10-21 – Hotman 2 (ホットマン2)
4. 2006-05-26 – The Hit Parade (ザ・ヒットパレード)
5. 2007-10-05 – Shigeshoshi (死化粧師)
6. 2008-01-06 – Atsu-Hime (篤姫)

=== Movies ===
1. 2005-09-03 – Kamen Rider Hibiki & The Seven Senki
2. 2005-09-22 – Money Draw (お金の引くこと)
3. 2005-11-25 – Hole in One ~Joshi Golfer Chiharu (ホールインワン ～女子ゴルファー千春)

=== Calendars ===
1. October 2003 – Abe Asami 2004 Calendar (安倍麻美 2004年度 カレンダー)
2. September 2004 – Abe Asami 2005 Calendar (安倍麻美 2005年度 カレンダー)
