= Pokémon Puzzle Challenge =

2000 video game for the Game Boy Color

- European cover art
- Developer: Intelligent Systems
- Publisher: Nintendo
- Directors: Toshihiro Nishii; Hitoshi Yamagami
- Producers: Takehiro Izushi; Ryoichi Kitanishi; Tsunekazu Ishihara
- Designers: Hitoshi Yamagami; Toshitaka Muramatsu
- Composers: Taishi Senda; Minako Hamano
- Series: Pokémon; Puzzle League
- Platform: Game Boy Color
- Release: JP: September 21, 2000; NA: December 4, 2000; PAL: June 15, 2001
- Genre: Puzzle
- Mode: Single player

Pokémon Puzzle Challenge (Note: Known in Japan as Pokemon de Panepon (Japanese: ポケモンでパネポン)) is a puzzle video game developed by Intelligent Systems and published by Nintendo for the Game Boy Color. It was released in Japan on September 21, 2000; in North America on December 4, 2000; and in PAL regions on June 15, 2001, it is the second Pokémon-themed entry in the Puzzle League series. While its Nintendo 64 counterpart Pokémon Puzzle League is visually based on the Pokemon anime, Puzzle Challenge instead draws inspiration from the Pokémon Gold and Silver games. The game features multiple modes of play and support for competitive play between two players. Puzzle Challenge was later digitally re-released via the Nintendo 3DS's Virtual Console line on November 6, 2014.

== Gameplay ==
Gameplay of the "Marathon" mode in Pokémon Puzzle Challenge

Pokémon Puzzle Challenge features gameplay similar to other games in the Puzzle League series; players control a two square long cursor that can swap or move blocks around the field. The objective is to remove blocks from the player's puzzle grid as new ones appear from the bottom. Placing three or more blocks of the same color in a horizontal or vertical line will cause them to disappear. Players can also perform combos by clearing more than three blocks at once, as well as chains when falling blocks from one clear cause another set of blocks to clear. A game typically ends when the blocks reach the top of the grid, at which point the player loses. In competitive modes, players can perform combos and/or chain clears to cause objects called garbage blocks to fall on their opponent's grid, further filling it in an attempt to cause them to lose. Concessions are made due to the game's limited screen size: Puzzle Challenge features a puzzle grid size of only 6x9 blocks, compared to the 6x12 grids of other Puzzle League games, and the opponent's grid is not visible, with a small meter instead indicating how close they are to losing.

The game features six primary modes of play. Marathon involves playing infinitely until the grid is filled and the player loses. Challenge is a competitive mode that pits the player against several computer-controlled opponents, framed as the player traveling around the Johto region challenging other Pokémon trainers and gym leaders. Time Zone challenges players to achieve the highest score within a time limit. Line Clear is a stage-based mode in which players must clear a certain number of lines to advance. Puzzle involves clearing specific arrangements of blocks using a limited number of moves. Garbage is an infinite mode similar to Marathon, but with increased difficulty due to garbage blocks frequently appearing on the grid. Using a Game Link Cable, two players can compete in standard versus play, Time Zone, or Line Clear. A training mode is also available.

The game is heavily themed after Pokémon Gold and Silver, featuring characters and remixed music from those games. Players can choose between different Pokémon that appear as part of the user interface. At the start of the game, players only have access to Chikorita, Cyndaquil, and Totodile, but can unlock six more Pokémon by completing specific objectives in Challenge mode then defeating their trainer. Four additional Pokémon appear as eggs, which can be hatched and used in Marathon mode after achieving a high score in the other modes.

== Development ==
Pokémon Puzzle Challenge was developed by Intelligent Systems. It was first announced in Nintendo employee Peter Main's "Industry Review" webcast on January 13, 2000, under the name Pokémon Attack, similar to prior Puzzle League game Tetris Attack. The title was later changed to Pokémon Puzzle League like its Nintendo 64 counterpart before finally settling on Pokémon Puzzle Challenge. Nintendo briefly planned to delay the release to 2001, until the delay of Kirby Tilt 'n' Tumble provided an available window in which to release the game. It was released in Japan on September 21, 2000, December 4, 2000, in North America, and June 15, 2001, in PAL regions. A screensaver was released by Nintendo to promote the game. The game has a hidden Game Boy version of Panel de Pon that can be played by inputting a button code.

== Reception ==
=== Pre-release reception ===
When it was first announced, few details were revealed. Upon hearing about it, IGN theorized that it was an Americanized version of Puyo Puyo Sun with Pokémon characters, similar to how Kirby's Avalanche was a localization of Puyo Puyo. In a preview, IGN praised Pokémon Puzzle Challenge for its gameplay, calling them "nice and simple to appeal to players of all ages and levels". In another preview, they comment that this idea was a great one to get kids to "stare at even more Pokemon images for even more hours on end".

=== Critical reception ===
Reception

Aggregate score
Aggregator	Score
GameRankings	90.20%

Review scores
Publication	Score
Electronic Gaming Monthly	9/10
Game Informer	8.5/10
GamePro	4.5/5
GameSpot	8.9/10
IGN	9/10
Jeuxvideo.com	15/20
Nintendo Life	8/10
Nintendo Power	10/10

Since its release, Pokémon Puzzle Challenge has received positive reception. It holds an aggregate score of 90.20% at GameRankings, making it the 10th best Game Boy Color game and the 300th best video game on Game Rankings. Nintendo Power gave it a perfect score, while Electronic Gaming Monthly gave it a nine out of 10. Nintendo Power nominated it for "best puzzle game" and "best Pokémon game". ultimately losing to Pokémon Puzzle League for the former category and Pokémon Gold and Silver for the latter. Nintendo Power also listed Pokémon Puzzle Challenge as the 13th best Game Boy/Game Boy Color video game, calling the gameplay only second in addictiveness to Tetris, ultimately giving the nod to this version of the gameplay over Tetris Attack because of a few extra features.

Game Informer's Ben Reeves called it the 12th best Game Boy game. He noted that it beat out Tetris Attack for this game's increased polish. Children's software & new media revue: Volume 9 called it "addictive", commenting that those who were not interested in the series would be fine, commenting that it "holds little similarity" to the Pokémon franchise. IGN editor Craig Harris called the return of the Tetris Attack gameplay "welcome", commenting that it was "as fun and addictive as it ever was". However, he criticized its lack of a Puzzle Edit mode, a mode found in the Nintendo 64 counterpart game Pokémon Puzzle League. He awarded it the Editor's Choice award. In a Pokémon video game retrospective, fellow IGN editor Lucas M. Thomas commented that while it didn't bring anything new to the Tetris Attack gameplay, it being in a "new, Colorized portable version was enough". GameSpot editor Frank Provo commented that it "does the Pokémon license proud", calling it both "addictive" and praising its overall value. GamePro gave it 4.5 stars out of five, awarding it their Editor's Choice award. William Schiffmann of the Associated Press commented that while it doesn't "break any new ground" and the Pokémon theme constitutes a "sales gimmick", fans of Tetris would enjoy it.
