= Puzzle League =

- Genre: Puzzle video game
- Developer: Intelligent Systems
- Publisher: Nintendo

Puzzle League, known as Panel de Pon (Note: Japanese: パネルでポン, Hepburn: Panel de Pon) in Japan, is a series of video games published by Nintendo for its various video game consoles. The series began with Panel de Pon in Japan, named Tetris Attack in North America, and has since been adapted to many other consoles. The core gameplay of each version is the same in each game, but branding, presentation details and console-specific features have varied.

== Gameplay ==
In each game in the series, square blocks (or panels) of various colors are stacked in a well. The blocks align to an invisible grid, such that the blocks occupy distinct rows and columns. In most game modes, new blocks appear at the bottom of the stack, slowly pushing the stack upward. The player typically loses the game when any column of blocks touches the top of the well.

The player controls a cursor that covers two squares horizontally in the invisible game grid. Blocks within this cursor can be swapped, or a block can be swapped with an empty space. If a block is moved into a gap with no blocks underneath it, the block falls as though affected by gravity. Players cannot directly move blocks vertically or diagonally, though in most game modes, they can raise the entire puzzle more quickly.

To clear blocks, the player must align them in rows or columns of three or more identically colored blocks (for example, three red blocks in a contiguous horizontal row). The blocks then disappear from the playfield, and any blocks above them fall into the cleared space. Clearing more than three blocks in a single move scores a "combo", worth extra points. If a clear causes other blocks to fall and cause additional clears, the player scores a "chain", also worth extra points. With skill and planning, the player can cause multiple contiguous clears to occur one after another, scoring a higher chain count and progressively larger bonuses. The player is free to continue moving blocks as others clear, which aids in maintaining an ongoing chain. Clearing blocks also causes the stack to stop rising temporarily, and scoring chains and combos causes the stack to remain stopped for a variable amount of time (determined by the size of the combo or chain).

=== Garbage ===
In several modes of play, rectangular garbage of various widths and heights can drop onto the player's stack, and can even extend above the top of the playfield. When a set of blocks that is touching a garbage block clears from the playfield, any garbage blocks touching this clear are "transformed" into regular blocks, which come into play when the garbage block is finished transforming. Any garbage blocks of the same type as the first one and touching the first one are similarly transformed, though non-touching garbage and differently-typed garbage do not transform in this case.

In versus modes, players can send garbage to their opponents' playfields by scoring chains and combos. This sends garbage blocks according to the player's color (arbitrarily assigned in some games, or based on the player's character selection in others). Combos send varying numbers and sizes of blocks according to the size of the combo, while chains send garbage blocks that span the width of the playfield and vary in thickness depending on the size of the chain. Players can also clear "shock blocks" (also called surprise blocks) – grey blocks usually containing exclamation points – that send chrome-colored garbage to the opponents' playfields. While these garbage blocks follow the same clearing rules, they do not clear when adjacent colored garbage blocks do, unless the match touches both at the same time.

A garbage block can also be seen as one of Kirby's randomized stone transformations throughout the Super Smash Bros. franchise.

=== Item blocks ===
Debuting in Planet Puzzle League, item blocks are special blocks that are optionally available in Garbage Battle matches, which cause certain effects when cleared. While the item is in effect, the item block is displayed to the right of the playfield of the affected player, scrolling up from the bottom of the screen, with the effect wearing off when the item scrolls past the top of the screen.

- Fever blocks, indicated by a flame symbol, cause all the player's clears during a fixed period of time to be chained together.
- Tri-Color blocks, indicated by a symbol of three squares, cause the variety of colored blocks in a player's playfield to be reduced to three colors for a fixed amount of time: red, blue, and green.
- Reflect blocks, indicated by a symbol of an upward-pointing arrow with a bar on top, cause a player's garbage to be sent to the opponent.
- Twitch blocks, indicated by a symbol of circular arrows, cause the opponent's playfield to shake, "shuffling" their blocks in which the blocks change color at random.
- Paralyze blocks, indicated by jagged line symbol, cause a row of blocks in an opponent's playfield to become inaccessible for moves for a fixed period of time.
- Fog blocks, indicated by an "X" symbol, change some of an opponent's blocks into un-clearable gray blocks for a fixed period of time.

== Games in the series ==
Games included in Puzzle League games
Title	Console(s)	Release	Comment(s)
Panel de Pon (Tetris Attack)	SNES, Game Boy, Satellaview	1995	Original version was only released in Japan for the Super Famicom; A localization for North America and PAL, titled Tetris Attack, was released in 1996 for the SNES and Game Boy. It features new art assets and characters from Super Mario World 2: Yoshi's Island.; Tetris Attack was released in Japan as BS Yoshi's Panepon for the Satellaview SNES peripheral in 1996
Pokémon Puzzle League	Nintendo 64	2000	Only released in North America and PAL region, features characters from the Pokémon anime
Pokémon Puzzle Challenge	Game Boy Color	2000	
Nintendo Puzzle Collection	Nintendo GameCube	2003	Compilation featuring Yoshi's Cookie, Dr. Mario 64, and a version of Panel de Pon based on an unreleased Nintendo 64 version, which was modified to become Pokémon Puzzle League. Only released in Japan.
Dr. Mario & Puzzle League	Game Boy Advance	2005	Released as a multi-game compilation.
Planet Puzzle League (NA); Puzzle League DS (PAL); Panel de Pon DS (JP)	Nintendo DS	2007	Part of the Touch! Generations brand.; An abbreviated version was released as DSiWare in 2009. It was titled: Puzzle League Express (NA) A Little Bit of… Puzzle League (PAL) Chotto Panel de Pon (JP)
Animal Crossing Puzzle League	Nintendo 3DS	2016	A minigame included in the Welcome amiibo expansion of Animal Crossing: New Leaf.
