= Pokémon, I Choose You! =

- Pokémon episode
- Frame of Ash Ketchum with his newly received Pokémon, Pikachu. Professor Oak is seen in the background.
- Episode no.: Season 1 Episode 1
- Directed by: Masamitsu Hidaka
- Written by: Takeshi Shudo
- Original air date: April 1, 1997

Episode chronology
← Previous —	Next → "Pokémon Emergency!"

"Pokémon, I Choose You!" (ポケモン！きみにきめた！, Pokemon! Kimi ni Kimeta!) is the first episode of the Pokémon anime series. It was first broadcast on April 1, 1997, on TV Tokyo. The episode was directed by Masamitsu Hidaka and written by Takeshi Shudo.

In the episode, Ash Ketchum gets his Pokémon journey off to a rough start when he receives his first Pokémon, a reluctant Pikachu. After many failed attempts at capturing some Pokémon, Ash throws a rock at a Spearow, which gets angry and starts attacking him and Pikachu. Soon, an entire flock of Spearow start chasing them, and Pikachu is the only one able to step in and stop the flock.

Nintendo, which publishes the Pokémon video games, asked for changes to be made to the English adaptation of the episode. Some graphic sequences involving punching were taken out, including one where Misty slaps Ash on the cheek. The script was translated by Paul Taylor. Veronica Taylor, who provided the English voice of Ash in this episode, said she enjoyed the script and recording Ash's lines.

Since airing, the episode has received positive reviews from television critics. Andrew Wood of The Plain Dealer praised the episode for staying true to the games, but thought it focused too much on the character Ash. A children's book adaptation of "Pokémon - I Choose You!" was released in July 1999, and the episode was released on Game Boy Advance Video in 2004. In 2017, a movie based on this episode, entitled Pokémon the Movie: I Choose You! was released, in an alternate continuity to the original series. Ash's and Pikachu's respective backstories prior to the original series were explored in the first episode of Pokémon Journeys: the Series, "Enter Pikachu!", which aired in 2019.

== Plot ==
External videos
- Pokémon - I Choose You! (full episode) via the Pokémon TV YouTube channel

In the world of Pokémon, people at the age of 10 can get their official license to become Pokémon Trainers, and Ash Ketchum from Pallet Town is about to receive his very first Pokémon from Professor Samuel Oak. On the morning of the ceremony, Ash oversleeps after accidentally breaking his alarm clock in his sleep, and runs in his pajamas to Oak's laboratory, where his rival and the Professor's grandson, Gary Oak, taunts him for arriving to the ceremony late, and brags about having already received his first Pokémon. When Oak tells Ash that all three starter Pokémon have already been taken, Ash pleads for any Pokémon, so Oak gives him the only one left, which turns out to be an Electric-type Pikachu. Ash thinks that Pikachu is cute, but Pikachu gives him an electric shock when he picks him up to hug him. Oak gives Ash a Pokédex and six Poké Balls before he heads out on his journey to become the best Pokémon Master in the world.

Ash soon comes to realize that Pikachu refuses to go inside his Poké Ball and prefers his independence. As Ash struggles to bond with Pikachu, who acts aloof and openly distrusts him, the two stumble upon a wild Pidgey, and Ash unsuccessfully tries to catch it by throwing a Poké Ball. Ash uses his Pokédex and learns that in order to catch a Pokémon via a Poké Ball, a Trainer must first use their Pokémon to battle it, thereby weakening it. With Pikachu being uncooperative, Ash tries to fight the Pidgey himself, but is easily beaten, greatly amusing Pikachu. The wild Pidgey escapes and Ash finds a wild Rattata rummaging through his pack. He chases the Pokémon off as he hears cooing behind him. He turns to see several Pidgey gathered in the tall grass. Frustrated, Ash throws a rock at what he believes is the Pidgey, but turns out to be a wild Spearow, which starts attacking him in retaliation. Pikachu shocks Spearow, and in the process alerts a whole flock. The angered Spearow flock gives chase and attacks Pikachu. Ash quickly grabs Pikachu and dives to a waterfall in order to escape from the flock, and the two are fished out down river by a young red-haired girl, who tells Ash to take the injured Pikachu to the Pokémon Center in Viridian City.

Seeing the Spearow flock approaching, Ash escapes with Pikachu, taking the girl's bike, but loses control and crash down a hill. Realizing Pikachu's condition is critical, Ash begs him to go inside his Poké Ball so that Ash can protect him from the approaching Spearow. Seeing how much Ash cares for him, Pikachu performs a powerful Thunder attack which drives all the Spearow away, but also destroys the bike in the process. As Ash recovers, a mysterious golden bird flies over a rainbow, and Ash's Pokédex informs him that there is no current data on this Pokémon and that there are several yet to be identified. Their bond established, Ash carries Pikachu into Viridian City.

== Production ==
"Pokémon - I Choose You!" was the first episode of the Pokémon anime to be made and aired in Japan. The episode was written by Takeshi Shudo, and directed by Masamitsu Hidaka. When the production staff started on the anime, they wanted a specific character to focus on. Pikachu got the role because it was relatively popular compared with the other Pokémon and the staff thought that "potentially both boys and girls would like it". The episode was animated by Oriental Light and Magic, and it was aimed at elementary school students.

=== English adaptation ===
Just before 4Kids Entertainment revealed that they were planning on producing an English adaptation dub of the anime in the United States, the episode "Dennō Senshi Porygon" caused controversy when it aired in Japan on December 16, 1997. In the episode, there was a scene with a huge explosion that flashed red and blue lights. At this point, viewers started to complain of blurred vision, headaches, dizziness, seizures, blindness, and lost consciousness. A total of 685 viewers were taken to hospitals by ambulances. Alfred R. Kahn, chief executive of 4Kids Entertainment, announced on January 1, 1998, that the anime would be edited for the American market. Many American parents worried about the safety of their children now that the anime would air in the United States, but Kahn said: "We're confident it won't be a problem. [...] We've taken the problem seriously and fixed it."

Nintendo asked for changes to be made to the original Japanese show in the English adaptation. "We tried not to have violence or sexual discrimination or religious scenes in the United States," said Masakazu Kubo, executive producer of Shogakukan. Some graphic sequences involving punching were taken out, including one from "Pokémon, I Choose You!" where Misty slaps Ash on the cheek. The names of the characters and monsters were Westernized: Satoshi became Ash, and Shigeru became Gary, and the Pokémon were given descriptive names. For example, of the three starter Pokémon, Hitokage, a lizard with a ball of fire on its tail, became Charmander; Fushigidane, a dinosaur with a green garlic bulb on its back, became Bulbasaur; and Zenigame, a turtle who squirts water, became Squirtle.

==== Voice acting ====
Veronica Taylor, who provided the voice of Ash in this episode and all episodes from season one to eight, said that recording Ash's lines for the episode was "really great" for her. "Playing a 10-year-old boy with that energy and excitement, and the battles that he's in, and his low, husky voice was really terrific," she said.

I really enjoy playing [Ash] and he’s really a great character, but I feel that after the first ten episodes everything has kind of loosened up. The script's loosened up, the characters were able to come into their own a bit more, and I think everyone has relaxed a bit; we're able to play with it more, whereas in the first ten episodes, I think it was so new, and everyone was trying to make sure it was done right. I enjoy playing him now much more than I did in the very beginning because I can have fun with him more, and we know him and can work out how he really would react.

Taylor explained the process of recording an episode in an interview with Animerica Magazine; first, the script is translated from Japanese into English, it is then adapted to fit the lip flap (movement of the mouth). Taylor said that she is the only one in the recording booth when she works, as they record each voice separately throughout each episode. Taylor added that she is often the first one to record, so she has to imagine how the previous line would be said. "Luckily, I work with a great director who helps with the interpretation of the line, matching of the lip flap, and consistency of the voice," she said.

== Reception ==
The episode has received mixed to positive reviews from television critics. Andrew Wood of The Plain Dealer had mixed feelings for the episode, stating the episode did a good job of setting up the world of Pokémon, and that it was faithful to the game. However, Wood thought it was "apparent" in this episode that without a traveling partner, "Ash just isn't all that interesting". Andrew Tei of Mania.com said that "one great thing about listening to early dubs is how the voice actors haven't completely gotten into their roles yet. Ash's and James' voices are much deeper than where they end up at." Louis Bedigian of GameZone believed the best moment of the episode to be the Pokémon battle on television at the beginning, stating that "the Pokémon battle side-to-side in black and white. Their movements are slow and appear to be turn-based. It emulates the game perfectly, then quickly transforms into a more realistic, full-color battle. Few game-based anime series incorporate the game elements so well." X-Entertainment considered the best part of the episode to be the moment when Ash spots the mysterious Ho-Oh, a Pokémon whose data was not included in the Pokédex at the time.

== Book adaptation and re-releases ==
A children's book adaptation of the episode was released in July 1999. It was published by Scholastic Corporation and written by Tracey West. The episode was released on VHS and DVD on November 24, 1998, and December 13, 1998, respectively as part of the first volume of Indigo League: "Pokémon: I Choose You Pikachu!" The release also included the following two episodes ("Pokémon: Emergency!", and "Ash Catches a Pokémon").

Nintendo announced on September 24, 2004, that two Game Boy Advance Video cartridges, featuring "classic" episodes from the early days of the Pokémon series, would hit stores on September 27 that year. The Pokémon episodes were packaged in two separate packs containing two episodes each, and the four episodes available were "Pokémon, I Choose You!", "Here Comes the Squirtle Squad", "Beach Blank-Out Blastoise", and "Go West Young Meowth", all from season one. In 2017, a Pokémon movie based on the first season and named after the first episode was released, titled Pokémon the Movie: I Choose You!.
