= Pokémon the Movie: I Choose You! =

2017 film by Kunihiko Yuyama

- Theatrical release poster by Yoshitoshi Shinomiya

Japanese name
- Kanji: 劇場版(げきじょうばん)ポケットモンスター キミにきめた！
- Literal meaning: Pocket Monsters the Movie: I Choose You!
Transcriptions
- Revised Hepburn: Gekijō-ban Pokettomonsutā Kimi ni Kimeta!
- Directed by: Kunihiko Yuyama
- Screenplay by: Shōji Yonemura
- Based on: Pokémon by Satoshi Tajiri
- Produced by: Minami Ichikawa; Satoshi Shimodaira; Susumu Matsuyama; Atsushi Chiku; Hidenaga Katakami
- Starring: see below
- Cinematography: Aya Aoshima
- Edited by: Toshio Henmi
- Music by: Shinji Miyazaki
- Production companies: OLM; OLM Digital
- Distributed by: Toho
- Release dates: July 6, 2017 (Japan Expo); July 15, 2017 (Japan)
- Running time: 97 minutes
- Country: Japan
- Language: Japanese
- Box office: $37.6 million

Pokémon the Movie: I Choose You! (Note: Known in Japan as Pocket Monsters the Movie: I Choose You! (劇場版 ポケットモンスター キミにきめた！, Gekijō-ban Pokettomonsutā Kimi ni Kimeta!)) is a 2017 Japanese animated adventure film created by Satoshi Tajiri and produced by OLM. It is the twentieth film of the Pokémon anime series and the first film of the alternate timeline trilogy. Loosely adapted from the anime's first episode and much of the first season, it was directed by Kunihiko Yuyama and written by Shoji Yonemura. The film stars the voices of Rica Matsumoto, Ikue Ōtani, Unshō Ishizuka, Megumi Hayashibara, Shin-ichiro Miki, Inuko Inuyama, Kanata Hongō, Shiori Sato, and Ryōta Ōsaka. Set in an alternate timeline, the film follows the journey of Pokémon Trainer Ash Ketchum, his partner Pikachu, and his new friends, Verity and Sorrel, as they seek to meet the Legendary Pokémon Ho-Oh at the summit of Mount Tensei.

I Choose You! premiered at Japan Expo in France on July 6, 2017 and was released in Japanese theaters on July 15. The release coincided with the 20th anniversary of the anime series. The film grossed $37.6 million worldwide and received negative reviews from critics.

== Plot ==
Ten-year-old aspiring Pokémon Trainer Ash Ketchum wakes up late one morning after having broken his alarm clock in his sleep. He eventually makes it to Professor Oak's lab, but he is told by Oak the three starter Pokémon (Bulbasaur, Squirtle, and Charmander) have already been taken by Pokémon Trainers who were on time. However, Oak reveals he has one more Pokémon, which is a Pikachu. Despite Pikachu's volatile and feisty personality, as well as his refusal to get inside a Poké Ball, Ash happily takes Pikachu on his journey.

Outside of Pallet Town, Ash encounters a wild Pidgey. When Pikachu refuses to fight it, Ash tosses a rock at it, but it hits a Spearow that mistakes Pikachu as the culprit. Soon, more Spearow shows up forcing Ash and Pikachu to run. Injured and tired, Ash tells Pikachu to get inside his Ball, but he once again refuses. Instead, Pikachu defends Ash from the Spearow flock by summoning a large Thunderbolt that scares them away. As the storm ceases, Ho-Oh flies above and drops a feather called a Rainbow Wing. Ash and Pikachu decide to go and find the Legendary Pokémon.

After hearing the Legendary Pokémon Entei is nearby, Ash and several other Trainers rush into the woods to look for it. Ash finds the Entei but ends up fighting over it with a young girl Trainer named Verity and an aspiring young boy Pokémon Professor named Sorrel. When Entei escapes, Ash and Verity argue and Sorrel leaves, urging them to find shelter. As they look for shelter, Ash and Verity find a Charmander, which they quickly learn belongs to an arrogant Trainer named Cross who left it out in the rain.

Cross refuses to take Charmander back, calling it weak, so Ash and Verity come across a cave where Sorrel happens to be and help Charmander back to health. Sorrel reveals that Ho-Oh only gives the Rainbow Wing to the "Rainbow Hero" who is destined to fight it, as a shadow Pokémon named Marshadow watches. The next morning, Ash convinces Charmander to join them. The group follows the Rainbow Wing, which guides them toward the Raizen Mountain Range, to meet Ho-Oh. Charmander evolves into Charmeleon. Verity sees a Suicune at a nearby lake. Cross returns and challenges Ash's Charmeleon with his Incineroar. Charmeleon is savagely defeated, causing Ash much grief.

Upset over his loss to Cross, Ash openly admits that he could have won with Pikachu and wishes he had gotten Bulbasaur and Squirtle with him. Alone in the woods, Marshadow puts Ash in a sleep-like state as the Rainbow Wing turns dark. Ash has a dream where no Pokémon exist and he attends regular school with Verity and Sorrel. Realizing something is missing, he remembers Pikachu and wakes up to his friends, and the Wing regains its color. Ash then reunites with his friends and apologizes for his actions, especially Charmeleon. Sorrel then explains how he lost his Luxray after a snowstorm which results from Sorrel afraid to befriend Pokemon ever since that experience. During the conversation, Pikachu notices Marshadow and uses his Thunderbolt but accidentally wakes up a bunch of wild Primeapes. Ash uses his Metapod to get the Primeapes webs and as a result, Metapod evolves into Butterfree and drives the Primeapes to sleep. The next morning, they see a Raikou after Ash releases his Butterfree to mate and migrate with a Pink Butterfree. The group realizes they are getting close when the Wing begins to glow in the direction of Mount Tensei.

On the summit, the group makes it to a crystal-like structure called Rainbow Rock but is interrupted by Cross who wants to fight Ho-Oh himself, having saw Ho-Oh too, but did not receive the Wing. Cross' Incineroar fights Ash's Charmeleon which quickly evolves into Charizard and defeats Incineroar in a Flamethrower clash. Cross, refusing to accept his loss, grabs the Wing and places it on the crystal, but due to his evil heart, it turns dark, causing Marshadow, an agent of Ho-Oh's, to turn the local Pokémon evil and attack Ash and his friends. The Trainers fight back but are overwhelmed by the severity of the situation. Ash finally withdraws a severely weakened Pikachu into his Poké Ball as the brainwashed Pokémon kills him, and he fades away as the Wing disintegrates. Pikachu comes out of his Poké Ball, realizing his best friend died. Heartbroken and devastated, he unleashes a massive Thunderbolt which hits Marshadow and its army, releasing them from Rainbow Wing's corruption.

Ash finds himself in an alternative dimension where Pokémon do not exist, but manages to find his way to back to life. Ash takes the newly formed Rainbow Wing and places it on the crystal structure. Ho-Oh arrives, healing everyone and Ash challenges it with Pikachu to battle (although the outcome is never shown). Cross leaves on good terms and eventually Verity and Sorrel leave Ash to achieve their own dreams.

Verity returns to her hometown to see her mother; Sorrel and his Lucario spot an Articuno which he wanted to study; Cross travels peacefully with his Pokémon; and Ash and Pikachu travel on their own while being tailed by Team Rocket. Ho-Oh drops a Rainbow Wing as it flies across the sky.

== Cast ==
Character	Japanese	English
Ash Ketchum	Rica Matsumoto	Sarah Natochenny
Pikachu	Ikue Ōtani	Ikue Ōtani
Pikachu	Ikue Ōtani	Kate Bristol (speaking scene)
Professor Oak	Unshō Ishizuka	Carter Cathcart
Narrator	Unshō Ishizuka	Rodger Parsons
Delia Ketchum	Masami Toyoshima	Sarah Natochenny
Jessie	Megumi Hayashibara	Michele Knotz
James	Shinichiro Miki	Carter Cathcart
Meowth	Inuko Inuyama	Carter Cathcart
Nurse Joy	Shoko Nakagawa	Michele Knotz
Sorrel	Kanata Hongō	David Oliver Nelson
Verity	Shiori Sato	Suzy Myers
Bonji	Arata Furuta	Mike Pollock
Cross	Ryōta Ōsaka	Billy Bob Thompson
Marshadow	Kōichi Yamadera	Simona Berman
45		45 Yanasé

== Production ==
The film was officially revealed during the December 15 broadcast of TV Tokyo's Oha Suta program, revealing a teaser trailer and poster of the film. This early content revealed Ash and Pikachu alongside the Legendary Pokémon Ho-Oh, showing that the film would act as a retelling of the first season, exploring some of the important plot points of the series. Ho-Oh's appearance in the film was also detailed to be important to the film's storyline. A second trailer for the film was revealed at the March 1 broadcast of Oha Suta, revealing remade scenes from the first episode and its official English title. It was then posted on the official YouTube page the next day.

Later on, the film's second official trailer, which also featured a new version of the original Japanese opening theme, "Mesaze Pokémon Master", was previewed on April 7, 2017. The next day, the producers announced that the current last Pokémon in the Pokédex, Marshadow, would debut in the film alongside several other brand-new characters. As the film is not a direct remake, it diverts itself from the original season that it is based on, and features an original story. Two days before the film's release, Yoshitoshi Shinomiya, who drew background art for The Garden of Sinners: Future Gospel and Fate/stay night: Unlimited Blade Works released a new poster for the film.

With the film confirmed to be initially released at the French Japan Expo 2017, Western fans requested for the film to be released in theaters in the United States. This was eventually confirmed to be released by Fathom Events as a limited release across November 4 and 5, 2017. In Australia, the film was also confirmed to be released by Event Cinemas across November 11 and 12, 2017. Some fans also requested that voice actress Veronica Taylor should reprise her role as the English voice of Ash Ketchum for the film, but it was later confirmed that the current set of voice actors would stay on. The title of the film is also a reference to the first episode of the anime, "Pokémon, I Choose You!".

== Music ==
Regular series composer Shinji Miyazaki wrote the film's score for its original release. The film's opening song is titled Aim to Be a Pokémon Master -20th Anniversary- (めざせポケモンマスター -20th Anniversary-, Mezase Pokemon Master -20th Anniversary-) by Rica Matsumoto while the ending is titled Oración's Theme ~Let's Walk Together~ (オラシオンのテーマ ～共(とも)に歩(ある)こう～, Orashion no Tēma ~Tomoni Arukou~) by Asuca Hayashi.

Veteran composer Ed Goldfarb, along with frequent collaborators Akhil Gopal and Kc Daugirdas, composed a new background score for the film's international release in his fourth film soundtrack to the Pokémon series.

== Release ==
=== Theatrical ===
I Choose You! premiered at Japan Expo in France on July 6, 2017, and officially released in Japanese theaters on July 15, 2017. Advanced pre-orders the movie tickets across limited time periods (from September 19 to October 30, 2017) allowed moviegoers to receive a serial code to obtain one of the six special Pikachu in Pokémon Sun and Moon, each wearing one of Ash's signature hats from each anime season. These Pikachu were holding an exclusive Pikashunium Z-Crystal. Also, both Marshadow and Ho-Oh were distributed during the film's release in Japan.

The Pokémon Company International and Fathom Events released the film, including its English version, on a limited theatrical run outside of Japan on November 5, 2017, and this was followed by television airings on Disney XD in the United States on November 25, on CITV in the United Kingdom on December 8, and on 9Go! in Australia on December 10. For the film's worldwide release, The Pokémon Company announced special commemorative Pikachu plush and Pokémon trading card game cards obtainable in US and Canadian retail sites.

=== Marketing ===
Merchandise coinciding with the film were also released. Bandai released official Poké Ball Breath Mint Cases in both regular and Premium-Bandai versions to coincide with the film's release. The first set was released in August 2017, and the second was released in September 2017, with pre-orders starting on April 23, 2017. Bandai also released S.H. Figuarts figures of Ash and the Team Rocket trio in July 2017, while Good Smile Company also announced they would release a Nendoroid of Ash in December 2017.

=== Home media ===
According to Oricon, the top-selling animation in Japan on Blu-ray/DVD by series sales surveyed from December 11, 2017, to June 10, 2018, ranks Pokemon The Movie: I Choose You! as the 29th most-sold anime series with 24,976 units.

== Reception ==
=== Box office ===
The film topped Japanese box office records, earning first place and grossing more than ¥516 million ($4.61 million) in the first two days, beating Gintama on its premiere. The movie earned ¥2.14 billion ($19.6 million) in its fourth week and remained at the sixth position. In its fifth week it grossed US$22 million and climbed up to the fourth position before being dethroned by Transformers: The Last Knight.

The film has grossed $30,024,522 in Japan, $3,559,886 in South Korea, $2,401,722 in the United States and Canada, £400,000 ($515,000) in the United Kingdom, $364,906 in Italy and Mexico, and $803,261 in other territories, for a worldwide total of $37,669,297.

=== Critical response ===
The film received negative reviews from critics. On review aggregator website Rotten Tomatoes, the film has an approval rating of 33% based on 9 reviews, with an average rating of 5.3/10. Callum May of Anime News Network gave the film an overall grade of A, calling the film a "Pokémon movie for classic Pokémon fans", and added: "While it features new Pokémon from Sun and Moon like Lycanroc and Incineroar, many of the stories and references are from the series 20 years ago, repurposed into far more emotionally moving encounters". He praised the film for having a stronger narrative than the other movies in the franchise, but criticized Sorrel and Verity's personalities, calling them "more like bystanders of someone else's story, and the attempts at creating backstories for them aren't built up at all". Brian Costello of Common Sense Media gave the film a score of 2 stars out of 5, writing: "Pokemon the Movie: I Choose You! is best for Pokemon fans or those who know enough about Pokemon to understand the battle scenes and already know and care enough about the characters to fully understand what's at stake."

=== Audience response ===
Some long-time fans of the anime expressed negative criticism of the film on social media due to the exclusion of Misty and Brock in favor of two new companions, with one saying "It's almost like Brock and Misty never existed". The point where Pikachu actually speaks the human language was also criticized. The English dub was also criticized for script changes, voice acting, music changes and the DVDs lacking the original Japanese sub version. Overall, fans were upset that these changes were not addressed. As shown at the film's first screening at the 2017 Japan Expo, most of the main characters from the first six series were relegated to cameos, which also caused some harsh criticism from older fans.

== Sequel ==
A sequel to Pokémon the Movie: I Choose You! called Pokémon the Movie: The Power of Us was released in Japan on July 13, 2018. and then worldwide in theaters on November 24, 2018.
